= List of J-Novel Club titles =

This is a list of titles published by J-Novel Club. J-Novel Club is a publishing company specializing in translation of Japanese light novels and novels into English.

== Active translations ==
=== Titles in publication ===
These are titles that are currently being published in Japan. Titles that have been translated through the current Japanese volume are indicated in bold. Titles that are waiting for the publication of the next volume in Japan are included in this list.

| English title | Japanese title | Publisher (Imprint) | Japanese | | English | | |
| English title | Japanese title | Publisher (Imprint) | Latest volume | Publication date (yyyy/mm/dd) | Latest volume | Publication date (yyyy/mm/dd) | Physical Release |
|---|---|---|---|---|---|---|---|
| **An Archdemon's Dilemma: How to Love Your Elf Bride** | 魔王の俺が奴隷エルフを嫁にしたんだが、どう愛でればいい? | Hobby Japan (HJ Bunko) | 16 | 2022/06/01 | 16 | 2023/02/28 | 14 Volumes by J-Novel Club |
| Ascendance of a Bookworm | 本好きの下剋上 ～司書になるためには手段を選んでいられません～ | TO Books | 31 (Note: The volume count may not be correct. The author numbers the volumes by Part and Volume. The latest volume is Part 5 Volume 10.) | 2022/12/10 | 28 (Note: The volume count may not be correct. The author numbers the volumes by Part and Volume. The latest English translated volume is Part 5 Volume 2.) | 2023/01/26 | 20 Volumes by J-Novel Club |
| Ascendance of a Bookworm: Fanbook | 本好きの下剋上ふぁんぶっく | TO Books | 3 | | 3 | | 3 Volumes by J-Novel Club |
| Backstabbed in a Backwater Dungeon | 信じていた仲間達にダンジョン奥地で殺されかけたがギフト『無限ガチャ』でレベル9999の仲間達を手に入れて元パーティーメンバーと世界に復讐&『ざまぁ！ 』します！ | Hobby Japan | 8 | 2023/10/19 | 5 | 2023/11/09 | None |
| Bibliophile Princess | 虫かぶり姫 | Ichijinsha (Iris NEO) | 7 | 2019/07/02 | 6 | 2020/10/13 | None |
| Black Summoner | 黒の召喚士 | Overlap (Overlap Bunko) | 15 | 2020/10/25 | 14 | 2020/11/11 | Announced by Yen P sse |
| Butareba: The Story of a Man Turned into a Pig | 豚のレバーは加熱しろ | ASCII Media Works (Dengeki Bunko) | 8 | 2023/10/06 | 1 | 2023/12/08 | None |
| By the Grace of the Gods | 神達に拾われた男 | Hobby Japan (HJ Novels) | 13 | 2020/08/22 | 13 | 2020/11/22 | 11 Volume by J-Novel Club |
| Campfire Cooking in Another World with My Absurd Skill | とんでもスキルで異世界放浪メシ | Overlap (Overlap Novels) | 14 | May 25, 2021 | 14 | 2021/09/29 | None |
| Can Someone Please Explain What's Going On?! | 誰かこの状況を説明してください | Frontier Works, Inc. (Ariane Rose) | 9 | 2019/08/10 | 9 | 2020/10/31 | None |
| Chillin' in Another World with Level 2 Super Cheat Powers | Lv2からチートだった元勇者候補のまったり異世界ライフ | Overlap (Overlap Novels) | 14 | 2022/07/25 | 7 | 2022/10/21 | None |
| Cooking with Wild Game | 異世界料理道 | Hobby Japan (HJ Novels) | 23 | 2020/12/22 | 22 | 2020/11/28 | None |
| Demon Lord, Retry! | 魔王様、リトライ！ | Futabasha (M Novels) | 8 | 2020/08/28 | 8 | 2020/11/22 | None |
| Dungeon Busters | ダンジョン・バスターズ | Overlap (Overlap Novels) | 4 | 2022/02/25 | 4 | 2022/07/27 | None |
| **Grimgar of Fantasy and Ash** | 灰と幻想のグリムガル | Overlap (Overlap Bunko) | 19 (Note: Includes two side story volumes, 14+ and 14++) | July 25, 2020 | 19 | 2021/01/03 | 19 Volumes by Seven Seas |
| Holmes of Kyoto | 京都寺町三条のホームズ | Futabasha (Futabasha Bunko) | 15 (Note: Includes one side story volumes, 6.5) | 2020/02/11 | 15 | 2020/11/17 | None |
| Housekeeping Mage from Another World: Making Your Adventures Feel Like Home! | 家政魔導士の異世界生活～冒険中の家政婦業承ります！～ | Ichijinsha (Iris NEO) | 7 | 2022/09/02 | 3 | 2022/10/17 | None |
| How a Realist Hero Rebuilt the Kingdom | 現実主義勇者の王国再建記 | Overlap (Overlap Bunko) | 18 | 2020/09/25 | 17 | 2020/08/22 | 17 Volumes by Seven Seas |
| **How NOT to Summon a Demon Lord** | 異世界魔王と召喚少女の奴隷魔術 | Kodansha (Kodansha Ranobe Bunko) | 14 | 2020/06/02 | 14 | 2020/12/01 | 14 Volumes by J-Novel Club |
| I Shall Survive Using Potions! | ポーション頼みで生き延びます！ | Kodansha (K Ranobe Books) | 8 | 2020/06/02 | 8 | 2020/10/10 | 7 Volumes by J-Novel Club |
| I'll Never Set Foot in That House Again! | 二度と家には帰りません！ | Overlap (Overlap Bunko) | 6 | 2023/01/25 | 6 | 2022/12/19 | None |
| I'm Giving the Disgraced Noble Lady I Rescued a Crash Course in Naughtiness | 婚約破棄された令嬢を拾った俺が、イケナイことを教え込む | Shufu to Seikatsu Sha (PASH Books) | 3 | 2021/07/02 | | | None |
| In Another World With My Smartphone | 異世界はスマートフォンとともに。 | Hobby Japan (HJ Novels) | 28 | 2020/10/22 | 28 | 2020/11/14 | 26 Volumes by J-Novel Club |
| Infinite Dendrogram | <Infinite Dendrogram>-インフィニット・デンドログラム- | Hobby Japan (HJ Bunko) | 20 | 2020/10/01 | 20 | 2020/12/08 | 18 Volumes by J-Novel Club |
| Invaders of the Rokujouma!? | 六畳間の侵略者!? | Hobby Japan (HJ Bunko) | 42 (Note: Plus two side story volumes 7.5 and 8.5) | 2020/10/31 | 42 | 2020/12/05 | 35 Volumes by J-Novel Club (11 Omnibusses) |
| Lazy Dungeon Master | 絶対に働きたくないダンジョンマスターが惰眠をむさぼるまで | Overlap (Overlap Bunko) | 17 | November 25, 2020 | 17 | 2020/12/08 | None |
| Monster Tamer | モンスターのご主人様 | Futabasha (Futabasha Bunko) | 16 | 2020/08/30 | 15 | 2020/11/11 | None |
| My Friend's Little Sister Has It In for Me! | 友達の妹が俺にだけウザい | SB Creative (GA Bunko) | 10 | 2020/12/09 | 10 | — | 10 Volumes by J-Novel Club |
| My Stepmom's Daughter Is My Ex | 継母の連れ子が元カノだった | Kadokawa Shoten (Kadokawa Sneaker Bunko) | 9 | 2022/07/01 | 4 | 2022/10/03 | None |
| Otherside Picnic | 裏世界ピクニック | Hayakawa (Hayakawa Bunko) | 8 | 2020/12/17 | 8 | 2020/12/27 | 6 Volumes by J-Novel Club (3 Omnibus) |
| Our Crappy Social Game Club Is Gonna Make the Most Epic Game | 弱小ソシャゲ部の僕らが神ゲーを作るまで | Overlap (Overlap Bunko) | 2 | 2020/06/25 | 1 | 2021/01/04 | None |
| Private Tutor to the Duke's Daughter | 公女殿下の家庭教師 | Fujimi Shobo (Fujimi Fantasia Bunko) | 15 | 2023/08/19 | 9 | 2023/09/14 | None |
| Reborn to Master the Blade: From Hero-King to Extraordinary Squire | 英雄王、武を極めるため転生す ～そして、世界最強の見習い騎士♀～ | Hobby Japan (HJ Bunko) | 9 | 2022/04/30 | 9 | 2022/09/16 | 1 Volume by Yen Press |
| Record of Wortenia War | ウォルテニア戦記 | Hobby Japan (HJ Novels) | 22 | 2020/11/12 | 21 | 2021/01/10 | None |
| Safe & Sound in the Arms of an Elite Knight | ド田舎の迫害令嬢は王都のエリート騎士に溺愛される | Drecom | 2 | 2023/04/10 | 1 | 2023/04/09 | None |
| Seirei Gensouki: Spirit Chronicles | 精霊幻想記 | Hobby Japan (HJ Bunko) | 23 | 2020/12/01 | 23 | 2020/11/12 | 20 Volumes by J-Novel Club (10 Omnibusses) |
| Slayers | スレイヤーズ | Fujimi Shobo (Fujimi Fantasia Bunko) | 17 | 2019/10/19 | 14 | 2020/12/14 | 12 Volumes by J-Novel Club (4 Omnibusses) |
| Tearmoon Empire | ティアムーン帝国物語 | TO Books | 11 | 2020/10/10 | 10 | 2020/12/12 | 9 Volumes by J-Novel Club |
| The Apothecary Diaries | 薬屋のひとりごと | Shufunotomo (Hero Bunko) | 10 | 2020/02/28 | 10 | — | 3 Volumes by Square Enix Manga & Books |
| The Great Cleric | 聖者無双～サラリーマン、異世界で生き残るために歩む道 | Micro Magazine (GC Novels) | 10 | 2020/11/30 | 10 | — | None |
| The Greatest Magicmaster's Retirement Plan | 最強魔法師の隠遁計画 | Hobby Japan (HJ Bunko) | 16 | 2020/08/01 | 16 | 2020/11/23 | None |
| **The Holy Knight's Dark Road** | 聖なる騎士の暗黒道 | Hobby Japan (HJ Bunko) | 3 | 2020/04/01 | 3 | 2020/09/12 | None |
| The Ideal Sponger Life | 理想のヒモ生活 | Shufunotomo (Hero Bunko) | 14 | 2020/03/30 | 14 | — | None |
| The Magician Who Rose From Failure | 失格から始める成り上がり魔導師道！～呪文開発ときどき戦記～ | Micro Magazine (GC Novels) | 6 | 2020/10/30 | 6 | — | None |
| The Master of Ragnarok & Blesser of Einherjar | 百錬の覇王と聖約の戦乙 | Hobby Japan (HJ Bunko) | 24 | 2020/08/01 | 24 | 2020/11/17 | None |
| The Misfit of Demon King Academy | 魔王学院の不適合者 ～史上最強の魔王の始祖、転生して子孫たちの学校へ通う～ | ASCII Media Works (Dengeki Bunko) | 12 | 2022/10/07 | 2 | 2022/09/23 | None |
| The Tales of Marielle Clarac | マリエル・クララックの婚約 | Ichijinsha (Iris NEO) | 10 | 2020/07/02 | 9 | 2020/12/19 | None |
| The Unwanted Undead Adventurer | 望まぬ不死の冒険者 | Overlap (Overlap Novels) | 12 | 2020/11/25 | 11 | 2020/12/12 | 10 Volumes by J-Novel Club |
| The White Cat's Revenge as Plotted from the Dragon King's Lap | 復讐を誓った白猫は竜王の膝の上で惰眠をむさぼる | Frontier Works, Inc. (Ariane Rose) | 7 | 2018/07/12 | 7 | 2020/10/27 | 6 Volumes by J-Novel Club |
| Villainess Level 99: I May Be the Hidden Boss but I'm Not the Demon Lord | 悪役令嬢レベル99 ～私は裏ボスですが魔王ではありません～ | Fujimi Shobo (Kadokawa Books) | 5 | 2022/06/10 | | 2023/05/29 | None |
| VTuber Legend: How I Went Viral after Forgetting to Turn Off My Stream | VTuberなんだが配信切り忘れたら伝説になってた。 | Fujimi Shobo (Fujimi Fantasia Bunko) | 6 | 2023/01/20 | 2 | 2022/10/17 | None |
| The World's Least Interesting Master Swordsman | 地味な剣聖はそれでも最強です | Shufu to Seikatsu Sha (Pash! Books) | 9 | 2020/08/28 | 9 | 2020/08/12 | None |
| **WATARU!!! The Hot-Blooded Fighting Teen & His Epic Adventures After Stopping a Truck with His Bare Hands!!** | トラック受け止め異世界転生ッ！熱血武闘派高校生ワタルッッ！！ | Overlap (Overlap Bunko) | 2 | 2020/06/25 | 2 | 2020/12/27 | None |
| Welcome to Japan, Ms. Elf! | 日本へようこそエルフさん。 | Hobby Japan (HJ Novels) | 8 | 2020/07/22 | 8 | 2020/12/27 | None |
| You Were Experienced, I Was Not: Our Dating Story | 経験済みなキミと、経験ゼロなオレが、お付き合いする話。 | Fujimi Shobo (Fujimi Fantasia Bunko) | 7 | 2023/09/20 | 1 | 2023/12/08 | None |

=== Titles that are completed ===
These are titles that have completed publication in Japan. Once fully translated they will be moved to the Finished translations section.

| English title | Japanese title | Publisher (Imprint) | Japanese | | English | | |
| English title | Japanese title | Publisher (Imprint) | Published volumes | Publication date (yyyy/mm/dd) | Latest volume | Publication date (yyyy/mm/dd) | Physical Release |
|---|---|---|---|---|---|---|---|
| Earl and Fairy | 伯爵と妖精 | Shueisha (Cobalt) | 33 | 2013/12/27 | | 2023/05/11 | None |
| My Daughter Left the Nest and Returned an S-Rank Adventurer | 冒険者になりたいと都に出て行った娘がSランクになってた | Earth Star Entertainment (Earth Star Novel) | 11 | 2021/11/16 | 5 | 2022/07/27 | None |
| My Instant Death Ability Is So Overpowered, No One in This Other World Stands a Chance Against Me! | 即死チートが最強すぎて、異世界のやつらがまるで相手にならないんですが。 | Earth Star Entertainment (Earth-Star Novel) | 14 | 2023/03/15 | 13 | 2023/02/20 | 2 Volumes by Yen Press |
| Outbreak Company | アウトブレイク・カンパニー 萌える侵略者 | Kodansha (Kodansha Ranobe Bunko) | 18 | 2017/08/02 | 16 | 2021/01/17 | None |
| The Epic Tale of the Reincarnated Prince Herscherik | ハーシェリク 転生王子の英雄譚 | Futabasha (M Novels f) | 5 | 2018/02/16 | 3 | 2021/01/12 | None |
| When Supernatural Battles Became Commonplace | 異能バトルは日常系のなかで | SB Creative (GA Bunko) | 13 | 2018/01/13 | 4 | 2022/10/03 | None |

=== Titles with no new volumes ===
These titles have been translated through the latest Japanese volume, but have not had a new volume published in a 12-month period and do not have a volume announced by the publisher. There is no information that the title has been cancelled by the publisher or formally ended by the author.

| English title | Japanese title | Publisher | Japanese | | English | | |
| English title | Japanese title | Publisher | Latest volume | Publication date (yyyy/mm/dd) | Latest volume | Publication date (yyyy/mm/dd) | Physical Release |
|---|---|---|---|---|---|---|---|
| Altina, the Sword Princess | 覇剣の皇姫アルティーナ | Kadokawa (Famitsu Bunko) | 14 (Note: Including (Loose Treads) a Side Histories Volume, published in between volumes numbers 7 & 8) | 2018/09/29 | 14 | 2022/05/23 | None |
| Amagi Brilliant Park | 甘城ブリリアントパーク | Fujimi Shobo (Fujimi Fantasia Bunko) | 8 | 2016/06/01 | 8 | 2019/11/25 | None |
| Banner of the Stars | 星界の戦旗 —絆のかたち— | Hayakawa Shoubo (Hayakawa Bunko JA) | 6 | 2018/11/05 | 6 | 2021/04/12 | 6 Volumes by J-Novel Club (2 Omnibuses) |
| Clockwork Planet | クロックワーク・プラネット | Kodansha (Kodansha Ranobe Bunko) | 4 | 2015/12/29 | 4 | 2018/10/12 | 4 Volumes by Seven Seas |
| Deathbound Duke's Daughter | 死にやすい公爵令嬢 | Futabasha (M Novels f) | 2 | 2017/07/14 | 2 | 2020/09/19 | None |
| Gear Drive | はぐるまどらいぶ | Overlap (Overlap Novels) | 1 | 2018/02/25 | 1 | 2018/09/05 | None |
| Girls Kingdom | ガールズキングダム | GL Bunko | 8 | 2018/10/26 | 4 | 2021/08/30 | None |
| Guide to the Perfect Otaku Girlfriend: Roomies and Romance | 同棲から始まるオタク彼女の作りかた | Kadokawa (Fantasia Bunko) | 5 | 2020/05/20 | 5 | 2022/03/22 | None |
| Her Majesty's Swarm | 女王陛下の異世界戦略 | Kodansha (Legend Novels) | 4 | 2019/10/06 | 4 | 2020/06/20 | None |
| Infinite Stratos | IS 〈インフィニット・ストラトス〉 | Overlap (Overlap Bunko) | 12 | 2018/04/25 | 12 | 2020/04/04 | None |
| Isekai Rebuilding Project | 異世界再建計画 | Kodansha (Legend Novels) | 2 | 2019/08/07 | 2 | 2020/04/25 | None |
| Kobold King | コボルドキング | Kodansha (Legend Novels) | 2 | 2019/07/07 | 2 | 2020/04/20 | None |
| Mixed Bathing in Another Dimension | 異世界混浴物語 | Overlap (Overlap Bunko) | 6 | 2019/05/25 | 6 | 2019/11/18 | None |
| My Next Life as a Villainess: All Routes Lead to Doom! | 乙女ゲームの破滅フラグしかない悪役令嬢に転生してしまった | Ichijinsha (Ichijinsha Bunko Iris) | 11 | | 11 | | 11 Volumes by J-Novel Club |
| Occultic;Nine | オカルティック・ナイン | Overlap (Overlap Bunko) | 3 | 2017/09/25 | 3 | 2018/02/20 | 3 Volumes by Seven Seas |
| Outer Ragna | ゲーム実況による攻略と逆襲の異世界神戦記 | Kodansha (Legend Novels) | 2 | 2019/03/07 | 2 | 2020/05/11 | None |
| Reincarnated as the Piggy Duke: This Time I'm Gonna Tell Her How I Feel! | 豚公爵に転生したから、今度は君に好きと言いたい | Kadokawa (Fantasia Bunko) | 10 | 2020/11/20 | 10 | 2023/04/28 | None |
| Sexiled: My Sexist Party Leader Kicked Me Out, So I Teamed Up With a Mythical Sorceress! | 女だから、とパーティを追放されたので伝説の魔女と最強タッグを組みました！ | Overlap (Overlap Novels) | 2 | 2019/08/25 | 2 | 2019/12/14 | 2 Volumes by J-Novel Club |
| She's the Cutest... But We're Just Friends! | 俺の女友達が最高に可愛い。 | SB Creative (GA Bunko) | 2 | 2020/06/11 | 2 | — | None |
| Teogonia | 神統記 | Shufu to Seikatsu Sha (Pash! Books) | 3 | 2019/06/28 | 3 | 2020/07/20 | None |
| The Economics of Prophecy | 予言の経済学 | Kodansha (Legend Novels) | 2 | 2019/04/07 | 2 | 2020/04/04 | None |
| The Faraway Paladin | 最果てのパラディン | Overlap (Overlap Bunko) | 4 | 2017/09/25 | 4 | 2018/04/08 | None |
| The Magic in this Other World is Too Far Behind! | 異世界魔法は遅れてる! | Overlap (Overlap Bunko) | 9 | 2019/10/25 | 9 | 2020/03/17 | 9 Volumes by J-Novel Club |
| The Sidekick Never Gets the Girl, Let Alone the Protag’s Sister! | 親友モブの俺に主人公の妹が惚れるわけがない | Shufu to Seikatsusha | 2 | 2019/11/29 | 2 | 2021/09/13 | None |
| The Underdog of the Eight Greater Tribes | 八大種族の最弱血統者 | Hobby Japan (HJ Bunko) | 2 | 2019/11/01 | 2 | 2020/04/28 | None |
| There Was No Secret Evil-Fighting Organization (srsly?!), So I Made One MYSELF! | 世界の闇と戦う秘密結社が無いから作った（半ギレ） | Overlap (Overlap Bunko) | 2 | 2019/08/25 | 2 | 2020/01/05 | None |

== Finished translations ==
These titles have all of the Japanese volumes translated and no new volumes are expected to be published.

| English title | Japanese title | Publisher (Imprint) | Number of volumes | Last published (yyyy/mm/dd) | | Physical Release |
| English title | Japanese title | Publisher (Imprint) | Number of volumes | Japanese | English | Physical Release |
|---|---|---|---|---|---|---|
| A Lily Blooms In Another World | 異世界に咲くは百合の花 | GL Bunko | 1 | 2020/02/24 | 2020/10/07 | 1 volume |
| A Wild Last Boss Appeared! | 野生のラスボスが現れた！ | Earth Star Entertainment (Earth-Star Novel) | 9 | 2019/04/19 | | None |
| Ao Oni | 青鬼 | PHP | 5 | 2016/03/18 | 2019/02/22 | None |
| Apparently it's My Fault That My Husband Has The Head of a Beast | 旦那様の頭が獣なのはどうも私のせいらしい | Ichijinsha (Ichijinsha Bunko Iris) | 2 | 2017/02/20 | 2019/01/24 | None |
| Are You Okay With a Slightly Older Girlfriend? | ちょっぴり年上でも彼女にしてくれますか？ | SB Creative (GA Bunko) | 6 | 2020/06/11 | 2021/11/15 | None |
| Arifureta: From Commonplace to World's Strongest | ありふれた職業で世界最強 | Overlap (Overlap Bunko) | 13 | 2022/09/25 | 2022/06/23 | 13 Volumes by Seven Seas |
| Arifureta Zero | ありふれた職業で世界最強 零 | Overlap (Overlap Bunko) | 6 | 2021/12/25 | 2022/08/04 | 5 Volumes by Seven Seas |
| Beatless | ビートレス | Kadokawa (Kadokawa Bunko) | 1 | 2018/02/24 (Note: The volume was split into two parts for publication) | 2019/12/25 | None |
| Bluesteel Blasphemer | 蒼鋼の冒涜者<ブルースチール・ブラスフェマ> | Hobby Japan (HJ Bunko) | 4 | 2016/04/30 | 2017/12/24 | None |
| Brave Chronicle: The Ruinmaker | 君から受け継ぐ英雄系譜<ブレイブ・クロニクル> | Overlap (Overlap Bunko) | 1 | 2015/11/25 | 2016/12/03 | None |
| Crest of the Stars | 星界の紋章 | Hayakawa Shoubo (Hayakawa Bunko JA) | 3 | 1996/06/01 | 2019/10/12 | 3 Volumes by J-Novel Club (1 Omnibus) |
| Culinary Chronlcles of the Court Flower | 一華後宮料理帖 | Kadokawa (Beans Bunko | 11 | 2020/04/01 | 2023/09/08 | None |
| Demon King Daimao | いちばんうしろの大魔王 | Hobby Japan (HJ Bunko) | 13 | 2014/04/01 | 2019/10/13 | None |
| Der Werwolf: The Annals of Veight | 人狼への転生、魔王の副官 | Earth Star Entertainment (Earth-Star Novel) | 15 | | | None |
| Echo | ECHO(エコー) | PHP | 1 | 2016/02/24 | 2018/11/24 | None |
| Endo and Kobayashi Live! The Latest on Tsundere Villainess Lieselotte | ツンデレ悪役令嬢リーゼロッテと実況の遠藤くんと解説の小林さん | Fujimi Shobo (Kadokawa Books) | 2 | 2019/08/09 | 2022/02/01 | None |
| From Truant to Anime Screenwriter: My Path to "Anohana" and "The Anthem of the Heart" | 学校へ行けなかった私が「あの花」「ここさけ」を書くまで | Bungeishunjū | 1 | 2017/04/01 | 2018/05/04 | None |
| Full Metal Panic! | フルメタルパニック | Fujimi Shobo (Fujimi Fantasia Bunko) | 12 | 2010/08/25 | 2022/07/19 | 4 Volumes; Omnibuses (3 in 1) |
| Fushi no Kami: Rebuilding Civilization Starts with a Village | フシノカミ ～辺境から始める文明再生記～ | Overlap (Overlap Bunko) | 7 | 2022/06/25 | 2023/02/02 | None |
| I Refuse to Be Your Enemy! | 私は敵になりません！ | Shufu to Seikatsu Sha (Pash! Books) | 6 | 2017/08/25 | | None |
| I Saved Too Many Girls and Caused the Apocalypse | 俺がヒロインを助けすぎて世界がリトル黙示録!? | Hobby Japan (HJ Bunko) | 16 | 2016/06/01 | 2019/10/27 | None |
| If It's for My Daughter, I'd Even Defeat a Demon Lord | うちの娘の為ならば、俺はもしかしたら魔王も倒せるかもしれない。 | Hobby Japan (HJ Novels) | 9 | 2019/09/21 | 2020/01/12 | 9 Volumes by J-Novel Club |
| JK Haru is a Sex Worker in Another World | JKハルは異世界で娼婦になった | Hayakawa Shoubo (Hayakawa Bunko JA) | 2 | 2019/12/04 | 2019/08/17 | 2 Volumes by J-Novel Club |
| Kokoro Connect | ココロコネクト ヒトランダム | Enterbrain (Famitsu Bunko) | 11 | 2013/09/30 | 2020/11/24 | None |
| Last and First Idol | 最後にして最初のアイドル | Hayakawa Shoubo (Hayakawa Bunko JA) | 1 | 2018/01/24 | 2018/09/17 | 1 Volume by J-Novel Club |
| Mapping: The Trash-Tier Skill That Got Me Into a Top-Tier Party | 外れスキル【地図化（マッピング）】を手にした少年は最強パーティーとダンジョンに挑む | Overlap (Overlap Bunko) | 8 | | | None |
| Me, a Genius? I Was Reborn into Another World and I Think They've Got the Wrong Idea | 異世界に転生したんだけど俺、天才って勘違いされてない? | Overlap (Overlap Bunko) | 3 | 2016/08/25 | 2018/08/09 | None |
| Middle-Aged Businessman, Arise in Another World! | アラフォー営業マン、異世界に起つ！ ～女神パワーで人生二度目の成り上がり～ | Kodansha (Kodansha Ranobe Bunko) | 2 | 2017/12/27 | 2019/10/08 | None |
| My Big Sister lives in a Fantasy World | 姉ちゃんは中二病 | Hobby Japan (HJ Bunko) | 7 | 2016/06/01 | 2017/12/30 | None |
| My Little Sister Can Read Kanji | 僕の妹は漢字が読める | Hobby Japan (HJ Bunko) | 5 | 2012/08/01 | 2021/01/03 | None |
| Paying to Win in a VRMMO | VRMMOをカネの力で無双する | Hobby Japan (HJ Bunko) | 6 | 2015/10/01 | 2018/01/18 | None |
| Seriously Seeking Sister! Ultimate Vampire Princess Just Wants Little Sister; Plenty of Service Will Be Provided! | とにかく妹が欲しい最強の吸血姫は無自覚ご奉仕中! | TO Books | 1 | 2018/08/10 | 2019/07/28 | None |
| Side-By-Side Dreamers | そいねドリーマー | Hayakawa Shoubo | 1 | 2018/07/25 | 2019/07/01 | None |
| Sorcerous Stabber Orphen: The Wayward Journey | 魔術士オーフェンはぐれ旅 | TO Books | 20 (Note: Number of volumes and publication date are from the Fujimi Shobo publication of the title) | 2003/09/20 | | None |
| The Combat Baker and Automaton Waitress | 戦うパン屋と機械じかけの看板娘 | Hobby Japan (HJ Bunko) | 10 | 2019/11/01 | | None |
| The Emperor's Lady-in-Waiting Is Wanted as a Bride | 皇帝つき女官は花嫁として望まれ中 | Kodansha | 4 | 2020/05/20 | 2022/04/07 | None |
| The Extraordinary, the Ordinary, and SOAP! | 非凡・平凡・シャボン！ | Frontier Works, Inc. (Ariane Rose) | 3 | 2017/12/12 | 2020/09/14 | None |
| The Hitchhiker's Guide to the Isekai | 異世界のヒッチハイク | Free Escape Association Bunko | 1 | 2019/08/08 | 2020/04/14 | None |
| The Sorcerer's Receptionist | 魔法世界の受付嬢になりたいです | Frontier Works, Inc. (Ariane Rose) | 4 | 2020/02/12 | | None |
| Villainess: Reloaded! Blowing Away Bad Ends with Modern Weapons | どうしても破滅したくない悪役令嬢が現代兵器を手にした結果がこれです | Kodansha | 3 | 2020/03/02 | 2021/11/29 | None |
| Walking My Second Path in Life | わたしはふたつめの人生をあるく！ | Earth Star Entertainment (Earth-Star Novel) | 3 | 2016/12/15 | 2018/03/01 | None |
| When the Clock Strikes Z | Zの時間 | Hobby Japan (HJ Bunko) | 2 | 2018/09/01 | 2020/10/26 | None |
| Wild Times with a Fake Fake Princess | 模造王女騒動記 フェイク・フェイク | Hobby Japan (HJ Bunko) | 3 | 2015/03/01 | 2020/10/17 | None |
| Yume Nikki: I Am Not in Your Dream | 夢日記 | PHP | 1 | 2015/12/04 | 2018/01/07 | None |

== Suspended translation ==
The translation of this title was suspended due to a controversy surrounding various racist tweets by the author.

| English title | Japanese title | Publisher (Imprint) | Japanese | | English | |
| English title | Japanese title | Publisher (Imprint) | Latest volume | Publication date (yyyy/mm/dd) | Latest volume | Publication date (yyyy/mm/dd) |
|---|---|---|---|---|---|---|
| [New Life+] Young Again in Another World | 二度目の人生を異世界で | Hobby Japan (HJ Novels) | 18 | 2018/05/24 | 3 | 2018/06/16 |
