= List of Seirei Gensouki: Spirit Chronicles volumes =

Seirei Gensouki: Spirit Chronicles is a Japanese light novel series written by Yuri Kitayama and illustrated by Riv. It was serialized online between February 2014 and October 2020 on the user-generated novel publishing website Shōsetsuka ni Narō. It was later acquired by Hobby Japan, which has published the series under its HJ Bunko imprint since October 2015. As of February 2026, twenty-eight volumes have been released.

A manga adaptation with art by tenkla was serialized online via Hobby Japan's Comic Fire website from October 2016 to February 2017, being discontinued because of the artist's poor health. A second manga adaptation with art by Futago Minaduki has been serialized online via the same website since July 2017 and collected in fourteen tankōbon volumes.

Both the light novel and the second manga have been licensed in North America by J-Novel Club.

== Light novels ==
No.	Title	Original release date	English release date
1	Kingdom of Lies; Itsuwari no Ōkoku (偽りの王国)	October 1, 2015; 978-4-79861-098-6	August 20, 2018; 978-1-71832-800-6
Prologue; Chapter 1: Past Life; Chapter 2: Another World; Chapter 3: False Accusation; Chapter 4: Royal Academy Enrollment; Chapter 5: Five Years Later; Chapter 6: The Outdoor Drill; Chapter 7: The Truth of the Lie; Epilogue
2	Blessing of the Spirits; Seirei no Shukufuku (精霊の祝福)	December 1, 2015; 978-4-79861-130-3	November 15, 2018; 978-1-71832-802-0
Prologue: Endo Suzune; Chapter 1: Journey to the Neighboring Country; Chapter 2: Assassin Girl; Interlude: Latifa's Memory; Chapter 3: Connection; Chapter 4: Encounter; Chapter 5: Misunderstanding; Chapter 6: Life in the Village; Chapter 7: Uninvited Guest; Chapter 8: Bonds; Epilogue
3	Requiem for a Goodbye; Ketsubetsu no Chinkonka (決別の鎮魂歌)	March 1, 2016; 978-4-79861-186-0	February 4, 2019; 978-1-71832-804-4
Prologue: Heritage Clues; Chapter 1: Life in the Village; Chapter 2: Passing Days at the Village; Chapter 3: Turmoil; Chapter 4: Parting; Chapter 5: To the Capital; Chapter 6: To the Capital Once More; Chapter 7: To the Village; Chapter 8: An Unexpected Visitor; Chapter 9: Omens of Farewell; Chapter 10: A Resolute Departure; Epilogue: In A World Like This
4	Eternal You; Yūkyū no Kimi (悠久の君)	June 1, 2016; 978-4-79861-235-5	April 9, 2019; 978-1-71832-806-8
Prologue: Latifa's Secret Diary; Chapter 1: Homecoming; Chapter 2: Upon Returning; Interlude: Adrift in Another World; Chapter 3: Meeting You In This World; Chapter 4: Explaining The Circumstances; Chapter 5: Meeting Who In This World?; Chapter 6: Shopping; Interlude: Summoning A Hero?! Sakata Hiroaki On The Scene!; Chapter 7: Preparing To Move; Chapter 8: Operating in the Shadows; Epilogue: To You, My Precious Person
5	The Silver Bride; Hakugin no Hanayome (白銀の花嫁)	September 1, 2016; 978-4-79861-283-6	June 10, 2019; 978-1-71832-808-2
Prologue: Latifa's Secret Diary 2; Chapter 1: A Chance Meeting and Welcome; Interlude: Talented Woman, Liselotte Cretia; Chapter 2: New Life in the Village; Chapter 3: To Strahl Again; Interlude: Celia's Woes; Chapter 4: Reunion with Celia; Chapter 5: The Silver Bride; Chapter 6: Against The Beltrum Royal Army; Epilogue: The Cerulean Lady
6	Twilight Overture; Ōma no Pureryūdo (逢魔の前奏曲)	December 29, 2016; 978-4-79861-343-7	August 12, 2019; 978-1-71832-810-5
Prologue; Chapter 1: The Plan From Here; Chapter 2: The First Night; Interlude: Playing in the Water!; Chapter 3: Shopping; Chapter 4: Infiltrating the Claire Estate; Interlude: Behind the Departure...; Chapter 5: Infiltrating Rodania; Interlude: Mii-chan; Chapter 6: Encounter; Chapter 7: Ambush; Chapter 8: Dilemma; Interlude: Meanwhile, the Hero and Mastermind...; Chapter 9: A Heroic Tale; Epilogue
7	Daybreak Rondo; Yoake no Rondo (夜明けの輪舞曲)	April 1, 2017; 978-4-79861-429-8	November 1, 2019; 978-1-71832-812-9
Prologue: An Unexpected Encounter; Chapter 1: The Road to Amande; Interlude: Let's Make Uniforms!; Chapter 2: Arrival in Amande; Interlude: Meanwhile, in the Proxia Empire; Chapter 3: Intruders; Chapter 4: Apology; Interlude: A Day in the Life of Miharu; Chapter 5: Evils Lurking Near; Chapter 6: Their Respective Nights; Chapter 7: Another Attack; Chapter 8: Daybreak Rondo; Epilogue
8	Beyond Memories; Tsuioku no Kanata (追憶の彼方)	September 1, 2017; 978-4-79861-516-5	January 13, 2020; 978-1-71832-814-3
Prologue: Beyond Memories; Chapter 1: Atonement; Chapter 2: Return; Chapter 3: A Discussion and a Request; Chapter 4: Your Shadow; Chapter 5: Departure; Chapter 6: Chance Encounter; Chapter 7: To Amande Once More; Chapter 8: Dreamland to Tomorrow; Epilogue: Satsuki Afterwards
9	Heroes in the Moonlight; Gekka no Yūsha (月下の勇者)	December 29, 2017; 978-4-79861-606-3	April 13, 2020; 978-1-71832-816-7
Prologue: Reflection; Chapter 1: The Days Leading to the Banquet; Chapter 2: To the Capital, Galtuuk; Chapter 3: Sumeragi Satsuki; Chapter 4: Secret Reunion; Chapter 5: Banquet, Day 1; Chapter 6: Banquet, Before Day 2. And in the Shadows...; Chapter 7: Banquet, Turmoil of Day 2; Epilogue: The Wandering Knight
10	Forget-Me-Not of Rebirth; Rin'ne no Wasurenagusa (輪廻の勿忘草)	March 31, 2018; 978-4-79861-677-3	July 5, 2020; 978-1-71832-818-1
Prologue: Determination; Chapter 1: After the Audience; Chapter 2: Banquet Day 3; Chapter 3: Their Respective Feelings; Chapter 4: A Family Reunion; Chapter 5: A Duel and the Result; Epilogue: Rebirth of Childhood Friends
11	Sonata of Beginnings; Hajimari no Sōmeikyoku (始まりの奏鳴曲)	September 1, 2018; 978-4-79861-748-0	September 6, 2020; 978-1-71832-820-4
Chapter 1: After the Uproar; Chapter 2: Masato's Decision; Chapter 3: Farewell, Onto a New Journey; Interlude: Sakata Hiroaki's Interlude; Chapter 4: Celia's Decision; Chapter 5: Chance Encounter; Interlude: The Pursuers; Chapter 6: Escape
12	Battlefield Symphony; Senjō no Kōkyōkyoku (戦場の交響曲)	December 1, 2018; 978-4-79861-821-0; 978-4-79861-800-5 (SE)	November 18, 2020; 978-1-71832-822-8
Prologue: Christina's Recollections; Chapter 1: On the Move; Interlude: Secret Talk; Chapter 2: The Road to Restoration; Interlude: Meanwhile...; Chapter 3: Signs of the Pursuers?; Interlude: Another Secret Talk; Chapter 4: Before the Border; Chapter 5: Ruler of the Battlefield; Epilogue: Yearning to be Special
13	Two Amethysts; Tsui no Murasakisuishō (対の紫水晶)	April 1, 2019; 978-4-79861-907-1	February 10, 2021; 978-1-71832-824-2
Prologue: After the Battle; Chapter 1: Across the Border; Chapter 2: Reunion; Chapter 3: Jealousy; Chapter 4: Yamata no Orochi; Chapter 5: Onwards to Rodania; Chapter 6: A Brief Rest; Interval: Consultation; Chapter 7: Secret of the Proxia Empire Castle; Chapter 8: Whereabouts of the Amethyst; Epilogue
14	Ballad of Vengeance; Fukushū no Jojōshi (復讐の叙情詩)	August 1, 2019; 978-4-79861-977-4; 978-4-79861-940-8 (SE)	April 30, 2021; 978-171832-826-6
Prologue: Before Departing; Chapter 1: The Royal Sibling's Ordeals; Chapter 2: Reiss' Intentions in Rodania; Interlude: The Fifth Hero; Chapter 3: Fang of the Avenger; Chapter 4: A Fierce Battle; Chapter 5: Paladia Kingdom Infiltration; Chapter 6: The Whereabouts of the Royal Siblings; Chapter 7: Before the Death Battle; Epilogue: Engagement
15	Hero's Rhapsody; Yūsha no Kyōsōkyoku (勇者の狂想曲)	November 30, 2019; 978-4-79862-058-9	July 12, 2021; 978-1-71832-828-0
Prologue: Liselotte's Melancholy; Chapter 1: After the Fierce Battle; Chapter 2: Recuperation of the Royal Sisters; Chapter 3: The Future From Here; Chapter 4: Meanwhile...; Chapter 5: Departure and Pursuit; Interlude: Duke Huguenot's Melancholy; Chapter 6: Return; Epilogue: Sakata's Decision
16	The Knight's Respite; Kishi no Kyūjitsu (騎士の休日)	April 1, 2020; 978-4-79862-186-9	September 24, 2021; 978-1-71832-830-3
Prologue: Reunion; Chapter 1: Report; Chapter 2: New Place, New Ripples?; Interlude: In Rubia; Interlude: In Centostella; Chapter 3: To Rodania; Chapter 4: Return and Reunion; Chapter 5: Information Exchange; Chapter 6: Departure; Interlude: Beltrum's Heroes; Chapter 7: Tea Party Turbulence?; Epilogue: Saint of Vengeance
17	Saint's Gospel; Seijo no Fukuin (聖女の福音)	September 1, 2020; 978-4-79862-260-6; 978-4-79862-227-9 (SE)	December 21, 2021; 978-1-71832-832-7
Prologue: Vow; Chapter 1: Life in the Garlarc Kingdom; Chapter 2: Preparing for Departure; Chapter 3: Reunion at the Village; Interlude: A Conversation between Ruler and Saint; Chapter 4: New Reunions, New Meetings; Interlude: Letter to the Centostella Kingdom; Chapter 5: The Saint's Development; Chapter 6: The Saint's Attack; Epilogue: Companion
18	Beast of the Land; Daichi no Kemono (大地の獣)	December 1, 2020; 978-4-79862-367-2	March 18, 2022; 978-1-71832-834-1
Prologue; Chapter 1: The Pursuit Begins; Chapter 2: On the Journey; Chapter 3: Holy Democratic Republic of Erica; Interlude: Meanwhile; Chapter 4: The Saint's Return; Chapter 5: Rescue; Chapter 6: Beast of the Land; Epilogue
19	Tachi of Wind; Kaze no Tachi (風の太刀)	April 1, 2021; 978-4-79862-478-5	June 3, 2022; 978-1-71832-836-5
Prologue; Chapter 1: One Act Before Trouble; Chapter 2: Ambush; Chapter 3: The Heavenly Lions; Chapter 4: Back and Forth; Interlude: Travel Log; Chapter 5: Hero Killing; Chapter 6: Tachi of Wind; Chapter 7: Signs of More Trouble; Epilogue
20	Her Crusade; Kanojo no Seisen (彼女の聖戦)	September 1, 2021; 978-4-79862-552-2	September 9, 2022; 978-1-71832-838-9
Prologue: Wish; Chapter 1: After Return, Before Return; Interlude: Pandora's Box; Chapter 2: Amakawa Haruto; Chapter 3: Report; Chapter 4: Training and Investigation Begins; Chapter 5: A New Match; Chapter 6: Quite Invasion; Chapter 7: Their Respective Intentions; Chapter 8: Assassination; Chapter 9: Crusade; Chapter 10: For Whom Is the Crusade; Epilogue: The Transcendent Ones
21	The Dragon's Disciple; Ryū no Kenzoku (竜の眷属)	March 1, 2022; 978-4-79862-752-6	December 19, 2022; 978-1-71832-840-2
Prologue; Chapter 1: Lost Memories, Lingering Emotions; Chapter 2: Mystery of the Transcendent Ones; Chapter 3: Disciple; Chapter 4: Plans for the Future; Chapter 5: In the Galarc Kingdom; Chapter 6: Talks; Chapter 7: Calm Before the Storm; Chapter 8: Attack; Epilogue: Reunion
22	The Immaculate Equation; Junpaku no Hōteishiki (純白の方程式)	August 1, 2022; 978-4-79862-887-5; 978-4-79862-821-9 (SE)	March 31, 2023; 978-1-71832-842-6
Prologue: The Rules of God that Rio Knows; Chapter 1: The Aerial Battle of Rodania; Chapter 2: Reunion; Chapter 3: Sisterly Bonds; Interlude: The Heroes' Resolution; Chapter 4: Celia's Return; Chapter 5: Secret Meeting; Chapter 6: Discussion with the Heroes; Chapter 7: The Power of a Hero; Chapter 8: Celia's Battle; Epilogue: A Prophetic Dream, Or...
23	Theatrics in Spring; Haru no Gikyoku (春の戯曲)	February 1, 2023; 978-4-79863-040-3	September 15, 2023; 978-1-71832-844-0
Prologue; Chapter 1: Tandem journey; Interlude: Tremor; Chapter 2: At the Galarc Castle; Chapter 3: Returning Home; Chapter 4: Erica's Footsteps; Chapter 5: Takahisa's Memories; Interlude: Miharu's Dream; Chapter 6: Impatience; Chapter 7: Holy City of Tonerico; Epilogue: Criminal
24	Sacred Flames of Darkness; Yami no Seika (闇の聖火)	August 1, 2023; 978-4-79863-240-7; 978-4-79863-154-7 (SE)	May 8, 2024; 978-1-71832-846-4
Prologue; Chapter 1: In the Holy City Tonerico; Chapter 2: Return; Chapter 3: The World outside the Castle; Chapter 4: Search; Chapter 5: Already Too Late; Chapter 6: Sacred Flames of Darkness; Epilogue
25	Our Hero; Watashitachi no Eiyū (私達の英雄)	February 1, 2024; 978-4-79863-403-6	September 3, 2024; 978-1-71832-848-8
Prologue: Preparations; Chapter 1: The Seventh Wise God; Chapter 2: Golem; Chapter 3: Live or Die; Chapter 4: Counterattack Signal; Interlude: Sandbox World; Chapter 5: Our Hero; Chapter 6: Untrustworthy Prophet
26	Where Fiction Lies; Kyokō no Arika (虚構の在処)	October 1, 2024; 978-4-79863-643-6; 978-4-79863-608-5 (SE)	May 30, 2025; 978-1-71832-850-1
Prologue: The Current State of the Restoration; Chapter 1: Rio and Miharu; Chapter 2: Return to Daily Life; Chapter 3: Behind the Daily Life; Chapter 4: Sleepover; Chapter 5: Conflict Between Parent and Child; Chapter 6: Brother and Sister; Chapter 7: Where Fiction Lies; Chapter 8: Rainy Night Rendezvous
27	Guillotine of Prayer; Inori no Dantōdai (祈りの断頭台)	October 1, 2025; 978-4-79863-976-5	May 22, 2026; 978-1-71832-852-5
Prologue: Monologue; Chapter 1: Vague; Chapter 2: Resolution; Chapter 3: Influence; Chapter 4: Apology; Chapter 5: The Future From Here; Chapter 6: Discussion; Interlude: Lingering Attachments; Chapter 7: Oath; Interlude: Will; Chapter 8: Choice; Epilogue: Decision
28	The Witch's Temptation; Majo no Yūwaku (魔女の誘惑)	February 28, 2026; 978-4-79864-079-2; 978-4-79864-043-3 (SE)	October 9, 2026; 978-1-71832-854-9
SS	Gaiden Amakawa Kyō no Shokutaku (外伝 アマカワ卿の食卓)	July 1, 2026; 978-4-79863-999-4	—

== Manga ==
No.	Original release date	Original ISBN	English release date	English ISBN
1	December 27, 2017	978-4-79861-598-1	June 10, 2019	978-1-71834-150-0
Chapter 1: Rio and Haruto; Chapter 2: Haruto's Memories; Chapter 3: Essence and Ode; Chapter 4: Nobility; Chapter 5: Royal Academy of Beltrum; Chapter 6: Private Lessons After Class; Original Short Story; Original Manga
2	June 27, 2018	978-4-79861-716-9	October 30, 2019	978-1-71834-152-4
Chapter 7: Skill Up; Chapter 8: Eyes All Around; Chapter 9: Decision; Chapter 10: Final Lesson; Chapter 11: Rio's Path Forward; Bonus Manga
3	November 27, 2018	978-4-79861-809-8	February 12, 2020	978-1-71834-154-8
Chapter 12: People From Days Past; Chapter 13: If You've Come to Amanda, Make Sure You Eat Past Soup!; Chapter 14: Lotte of the Ricca Guild; Chapter 15: Those Involved; Chapter 16: Latifa; Bonus Manga
4	July 26, 2019	978-4-79861-967-5	April 29, 2020	978-1-71834-156-2
Chapter 17: A Familiar Memory; Chapter 18: Spirit Folk; Chapter 19: Village of the Spirits; Chapter 20: Dryas the Spirit; Chapter 21: Life in the Village; Bonus Manga
5	April 27, 2020	978-4-79862-200-2	February 24, 2021	978-1-71834-158-6
Chapter 22: Reiss' Motives; Chapter 23: Farewells and Reunions; Chapter 24: Memories of my Parents; Chapter 25: Hometown Life; Chapter 26: Rio's Decision; Bonus Manga
6	December 26, 2020	978-4-79862-374-0	September 1, 2021	978-1-71834-160-9
Chapter 27: The Capital; Chapter 28: Karasuki's King; Chapter 29: With Mother and Lucius; Chapter 30: Duty of an Older Brother; Chapter 31: To Those Dear...; Bonus Manga
7	August 2, 2021	978-4-79862-560-7	February 9, 2022	978-1-71834-162-3
Chapter 32: To the Spirit Village Once More; Chapter 33: Guided; Chapter 34: Reunion...?; Chapter 35: In This Otherworld; Chapter 36: Haruto's Contractee; Bonus Manga
8	April 30, 2022	978-4-79862-650-5	August 10, 2022	978-1-71834-164-7
Chapter 37: Shopping in Amande; Chapter 38: Welcome, Hero; Chapter 39: To the Defiant Little Sister; Chapter 40: Haruto and Haru-kun; Chapter 41: Human-Shaped Monsters; Bonus Manga
9	February 1, 2023	978-4-79862-995-7	July 26, 2023	978-1-71834-165-4
Chapter 42: Gathering at the Village; Chapter 43: Haruto's Trial; Chapter 44: Teacher of Strahl; Chapter 45: Liselotte's Intentions; Chapter 46: Duke Arbor's Son; Bonus Manga
10	September 29, 2023	978-4-79863-211-7	June 12, 2024	978-1-71834-166-1
Chapter 47: Reunion with Celia; Chapter 48: The Silver Bride; Chapter 49: Celia's Will; Chapter 50: Rio Surrounded; Chapter 51: Thank You...; Bonus Manga
11	August 1, 2024	978-4-79863-521-7	February 19, 2025	978-1-71834-167-8
Chapter 52: Peace and Confusion; Chapter 53: Their First Night Together?; Chapter 54: The Hero's Magic; Chapter 55: Mii-chan and Haru-kun; Chapter 56: Homecoming and Farewell; Bonus Manga
12	March 1, 2025	978-4-79863-720-4	December 24, 2025	978-1-71834-168-5
Chapter 57: Selfish Hero; Chapter 58: Monsters Attack!; Chapter 59: More Danger; Chapter 60: Difference in Forces; Bonus Manga
13	December 27, 2025	978-4-79863-916-1	–	—
14	August 3, 2026	978-4-79864-225-3	–	—
