= Charano! =

Japanese light novel magazine

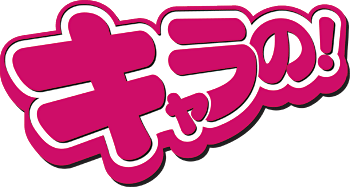
- Categories: Shōnen/Seinen light novels, manga and Role-playing games.
- Frequency: Monthly (2006–2008); Bi-monthly (2008–2013)
- Founded: 2006
- Final issue: 2013
- Company: Hobby Japan
- Country: Japan
- Based in: Tokyo
- Language: Japanese
- Website: Official website (archived)

Charano! (キャラの！), was a monthly Japanese light novel magazine, first published in September 2006. The magazine is aimed at young men. It was first titled Novel Japan, but on June 30, 2007, its title was changed to Charano!.

== Serialized works ==
- Alexion Saga
- Armored Trooper Votoms: Command Vorct
- Chōkōseijo Becky
- Dungeons & Dragons Replay
- Fake-Fake: Mozō Ohjo Sōdōki
- Gekitō! Queen's Blade
- Goddess!
- Idolmaster Xenoglossia: Iori Sunshine!+
- My-HiME Destiny
- Neverland Chronicle
- Nihon Jōkū Irassaimase
- Yūgeshō

== See also ==
- HJ Bunko
