= An Archdemon's Dilemma: How to Love Your Elf Bride =

Japanese light novel series and its franchise

- First light novel volume cover, featuring Zagan (left), and Nephy (right)

魔王の俺が奴隷エルフを嫁にしたんだが、どう愛でればいい? (Maō no Ore ga Dorei Erufu o Yome ni Shita ndaga, Dō Medereba ī?)
- Genre: Adventure; Fantasy comedy; Romantic comedy
- Light novel
- Written by: Fuminori Teshima
- Illustrated by: COMTA
- Published by: Hobby Japan
- English publisher: NA: J-Novel Club
- Imprint: HJ Bunko
- Original run: February 1, 2017 – present
- Volumes: 22
- Manga
- Written by: Fuminori Teshima
- Illustrated by: Hako Itagaki
- Published by: Hobby Japan
- English publisher: NA: J-Novel Club
- Imprint: HJ Comics
- Magazine: Comic Fire
- Original run: February 2018 – present
- Volumes: 16
- Manga

An Archdemon's (Friend's) Dilemma: How to Love a Crybaby Knight
- Written by: Momo Futaba
- Published by: Hobby Japan
- English publisher: NA: J-Novel Club
- Imprint: HJ Comics
- Magazine: Comic Fire
- Original run: December 2021 – present
- Volumes: 3
- Anime television series
- Directed by: Hiroshi Ishiodori
- Written by: Aya Yoshinaga
- Music by: Yuma Yamaguchi
- Studio: Brain's Base (animation); TMS Entertainment (production and planning) (Note: Under "Unlimited Produce by TMS" brand.)
- Licensed by: Crunchyroll: SEA: Plus Media Networks Asia
- Original network: Tokyo MX, MBS, BS Asahi
- Original run: April 5, 2024 – June 21, 2024
- Episodes: 12
- icon

An Archdemon's Dilemma: How to Love Your Elf Bride (Japanese: 魔王の俺が奴隷エルフを嫁にしたんだが、どう愛でればいい?, Hepburn: Maō no Ore ga Dorei Erufu o Yome ni Shita ndaga, Dō Medereba ī?), also known as Madome (まどめ) for short, is a Japanese light novel series written by Fuminori Teshima and illustrated by COMTA. The first volume of the light novel was published in February 2017 by Hobby Japan under their HJ Bunko imprint. 22 volumes have been released as of July 2026. A manga adaptation with art by Hako Itagaki has been serialized via Hobby Japan's Comic Fire website since February 2018. Both the light novel and manga have been licensed in North America by J-Novel Club. An anime television series adaptation produced by TMS Entertainment and animated by Brain's Base aired from April to June 2024.

== Plot ==
During an underground auction, the sorcerer Zagan meets the gorgeous elf slave Nephelia (often shortened to Nephy) and immediately falls in love with her at first sight, spending all his fortune to purchase her. Initially, the young elf girl shows no romantic interest for Zagan at all, but as the pair starts cohabitating in Zagan's castle, their relationship improves and develops, meeting new friends and facing powerful enemies in their pursuit of a peaceful and happy life together.

== Characters ==
Zagan (ザガン, Zagan)
Voiced by: Yūsuke Kobayashi (Japanese); Kieran Flitton (English)
Zagan is the newest and youngest of the 13 archdemons, a title bestowed on the strongest magicians alive. Zagan lives alone in his castle until he falls in love at first sight with Nephy and spends all his fortune to purchase her in an auction. Despite his lack of communication skills, and Nephy's initial lack of interest in him, Zagan gets close to her and the two end up becoming a couple. As an archdemon, Zagan has powerful enemies, such as other magicians who want to claim his title by defeating him, the church, which views him as a threat to the world, and several other archdemons who intend to make use of him and Nephy for their own purposes.
Nephy (ネフィ, Nefi)
Voiced by: Kana Ichinose (Japanese); Abigail Blythe (English)
A beautiful young elf slave bought by Zagan, whose full name is Nephelia (or Nephy as she is usually called). She initially had no romantic feelings for him whatsoever, only seeing him as another scary and abusive owner and secretly wanting to flee from him, but as they spend time together, she begins to warm up to him and eventually reciprocates his feelings, becoming his bride. Despite Zagan's desire to destroy the slave collar that binds her to him, she does not care because to her it is a proof of their unbreakable bond. Nephy is actually a high-elf of a distinctive lineage, capable of casting a rare and powerful type of holy magic that she eventually develops in order to assist Zagan in battle, but because of this, she ends up becoming targeted by other archdemons who want to take hold of her power.
Chastille Lillqvist (シャスティル・リルクヴィスト, Shasutiru Rirukuvisuto)
Voiced by: Hana Hishikawa (Japanese); Monica Flatley (English)
A young Holy Knight who welds one of the 12 Holy Swords, but is otherwise clumsy and emotional. She becomes close friends with Zagan and Nephy as they live together.
Barbatos (バルバロス, Barubarosu)
Voiced by: Kishō Taniyama (Japanese); Mark Allen Jr. (English)
Zagan's rival who is initially jealous of the latter's power and archdemon title, though he reluctantly becomes an ally after helping Zagan and Nephy using his teleportation magic. He develops feelings for Chastille as he takes care of her.
Valefor/For (フォル, Foru)
Voiced by: Akane Misaka
A young dragon girl who was taken in and adopted by Zagan and Nephy after the murder of her father.
Raphael Hyurandell (ラーファエル・ヒュランデル, Rāfaeru Hyuranderu)
Voiced by: Tetsu Inada
A powerful Holy Knight who has a secret.
Manuela (マニュエラ, Manyuera)
Voiced by: Ayasa Itō (Japanese); Brittany Lauda (English)
A young demi-human girl with wings who runs a clothing store near Zagan's castle. She is friendly, kind and bubbly, and along with Chastille, forms a close friendship with Nephy.

== Media ==
=== Light novels ===
Hobby Japan published the first light novel volume in print with illustrations by COMTA on February 1, 2017. As of July 31, 2026, twenty-two volumes have been published. The light novel is licensed in North America by J-Novel Club.

| No. | Original release date | Original ISBN | English release date | English ISBN |
|---|---|---|---|---|
| 1 | February 1, 2017 | 978-4-7986-1381-9 | August 18, 2018 (digital); November 5, 2019 (print) | 978-1-7183-5700-6 |
| 2 | June 1, 2017 | 978-4-7986-1460-1 | October 20, 2018 (digital); December 3, 2019 (print) | 978-1-7183-5701-3 |
| 3 | September 1, 2017 | 978-4-7986-1517-2 | December 18, 2018 (digital); January 7, 2020 (print) | 978-1-7183-5702-0 |
| 4 | December 29, 2017 | 978-4-7986-1584-4 | February 20, 2019 (digital); March 3, 2020 (print) | 978-1-7183-5703-7 |
| 5 | March 31, 2018 | 978-4-7986-1678-0 | April 27, 2019 (digital); May 5, 2020 (print) | 978-1-7183-5704-4 |
| 6 | August 1, 2018 | 978-4-7986-1723-7 | June 29, 2019 (digital); July 7, 2020 (print) | 978-1-7183-5705-1 |
| 7 | December 1, 2018 | 978-4-7986-1820-3 | August 26, 2019 (digital); September 1, 2020 (print) | 978-1-7183-5706-8 |
| 8 | April 1, 2019 | 978-4-7986-1906-4 | November 19, 2019 (digital); November 3, 2020 (print) | 978-1-7183-5707-5 |
| 9 | August 31, 2019 | 978-4-7986-1997-2 | February 2, 2020 (digital); January 5, 2021 (print) | 978-1-7183-5708-2 |
| 10 | February 1, 2020 | 978-4-7986-2121-0; 978-4-7986-2078-7 (SE) | June 27, 2020 (digital); March 2, 2021 (print) | 978-1-7183-5709-9 |
| 11 | August 1, 2020 | 978-4-7986-2230-9 | December 16, 2020 (digital); July 20, 2021 (print) | 978-1-7183-5710-5 |
| 12 | April 1, 2021 | 978-4-7986-2394-8 | October 4, 2021 (digital); May 24, 2022 (print) | 978-1-7183-5711-2 |
| 13 | September 1, 2021 | 978-4-7986-2577-5 | April 15, 2022 (digital); November 1, 2022 (print) | 978-1-7183-5712-9 |
| 14 | December 28, 2021 | 978-4-7986-2703-8 | August 4, 2022 (digital); May 16, 2023 (print) | 978-1-7183-5713-6 |
| 15 | June 1, 2022 | 978-4-7986-2829-5 | February 28, 2023 (digital); November 13, 2023 (print) | 978-1-7183-5714-3 |
| 16 | November 1, 2022 | 978-4-7986-2985-8 | July 6, 2023 (digital); April 8, 2024 (print) | 978-1-7183-5715-0 |
| 17 | August 1, 2023 | 978-4-7986-3243-8 | June 3, 2024 (digital); April 15, 2025 (print) | 978-1-7183-5716-7 |
| 18 | April 1, 2024 | 978-4-7986-3501-9 | September 19, 2024 (digital); September 9, 2025 (print) | 978-1-7183-5717-4 |
| 19 | December 27, 2024 | 978-4-7986-3726-6 | June 3, 2025 (digital); March 10, 2026 (print) | 978-1-7183-5718-1 |
| 20 | July 1, 2025 | 978-4-7986-3888-1 | January 22, 2026 (digital); November 10, 2026 (print) | 978-1-7183-5719-8 |
| 21 | December 1, 2025 | 978-4-7986-4026-6 | July 2, 2026 | 978-1-7183-2540-1 |
| 22 | July 31, 2026 | 978-4-7986-4214-7 | — | — |

=== Manga ===
A manga adaptation illustrated by Hako Itagaki began serialization in Hobby Japan's Comic Fire website in February 2018. The series has been collected in 16 volumes as of November 2, 2026. The manga is also licensed by J-Novel Club.

| No. | Original release date | Original ISBN | English release date | English ISBN |
|---|---|---|---|---|
| 1 | August 27, 2018 | 978-4-7986-1756-5 | June 11, 2019 (digital) | 978-1-7183-3850-0 |
1. "First Love is a Nasty Disease that Everybody Suffers"; 2. "The First Love of Someone with a Communication Disorder is Similar to the Taste of Moldy Bread ①"; 3. "The First Love of Someone with a Communication Disorder is Similar to the Taste of Moldy Bread ②"; 4. "The First Love of Someone with a Communication Disorder is Similar to the Taste of Moldy Bread ③"; Afterword
| 2 | February 22, 2019 | 978-4-7986-1870-8 | December 4, 2019 (digital) | 978-1-7183-3852-4 |
5. "It's Terrifying When a Normally Quiet Child Gets Angry ①"; 6. "It's Terrifying When a Normally Quiet Child Gets Angry ②"; 7. "It's Terrifying When a Normally Quiet Child Gets Angry ③"; 8. "It's Terrifying When a Normally Quiet Child Gets Angry ④"; 9. "Unrequited Love is Something That Can Even Physically Hurt ①"; Bonus; Afterword
| 3 | August 27, 2019 | 978-4-7986-1984-2 | March 25, 2020 (digital) | 978-1-7183-3854-8 |
10. "Unrequited Love is Something That Can Even Physically Hurt ②"; 11. "Unrequited Love is Something That Can Even Physically Hurt ③"; 12. "An Archdemon's Actions Are Expected to be Audacious ①"; 13. "An Archdemon's Actions Are Expected to be Audacious ②"; 14. "Even an Archdemon Shouldn't Beat a Child ①"; Afterword; Short Story
| 4 | February 2, 2020 | 978-4-7986-2131-9 | February 3, 2021 (digital) | 978-1-7183-3856-2 |
15. "Even an Archdemon Shouldn't Beat a Child ②"; 16. "A Dragon I Picked Up Got Overly Attached to Me, so I Made Her My Daughter ①"; 17. "A Dragon I Picked Up Got Overly Attached to Me, so I Made Her My Daughter ②"; 18. "Getting Involved with Angelic Knight Business Is a Huge Pain ①"; 19. "Getting Involved with Angelic Knight Business Is a Huge Pain ②"; 20. "Getting Involved with Angelic Knight Business Is a Huge Pain ③"; Bonus Content; Short Story
| 5 | August 27, 2020 | 978-4-7986-2269-9 | May 5, 2021 (digital) | 978-1-7183-3858-6 |
21. "Beating Down an Evil Monster is the Job of an Angelic Knight ①"; 22. "Beating Down an Evil Monster is the Job of an Angelic Knight ②"; 23. "Beating Down an Evil Monster is the Job of an Angelic Knight ③"; 24. "Beating Down an Evil Monster is the Job of an Angelic Knight ④"; 25. "I'll Get Angry Even if the One Who Raised Their Hand Against My Bride is a Beautiful Girl"; Bonus
| 6 | March 1, 2021 | 978-4-7986-2432-7 | September 1, 2021 (digital) | 978-1-7183-3860-9 |
26. "I'll Get Angry Even if the One Who Raised Their Hand Against My Bride is a Beautiful Girl ②"; 27. "A Cruise Can Create a Good Atmosphere ①"; 28. "A Cruise Can Create a Good Atmosphere ②"; 29. "Naturally, Any Archdemon Will Have a Horrendous Personality ①"; 30. "Naturally, Any Archdemon Will Have a Horrendous Personality ②"; Bonus
| 7 | September 1, 2021 | 978-4-7986-2586-7 | January 26, 2022 (digital) | 978-1-7183-3862-3 |
31. "Naturally, Any Archdemon Will Have a Horrendous Personality ③"; 32. "Naturally, Any Archdemon Will Have a Horrendous Personality ④"; 33. "Since the Stars Seem to Be About to Fall, I Thought I'd Try Dancing a Little ①"; 34. "Since the Stars Seem to Be About to Fall, I Thought I'd Try Dancing a Little ②"; 35. "Since the Stars Seem to Be About to Fall, I Thought I'd Try Dancing a Little ③"; Bonus
| 8 | April 1, 2022 | 978-4-7986-2649-9 | October 12, 2022 (digital) | 978-1-7183-3864-7 |
36. "Our Family Has Grown, so It's Time to Visit My Bride's Home ①"; 37. "Our Family Has Grown, so It's Time to Visit My Bride's Home ②"; 38. "Our Family Has Grown, so It's Time to Visit My Bride's Home ③"; 39. "Love the Girl Dear to You, and She Will Love You in Return ①"; 40. "Love the Girl Dear to You, and She Will Love You in Return ②"; 41. "Love the Girl Dear to You, and She Will Love You in Return ③"; Bonus
| 9 | November 1, 2022 | 978-4-7986-2896-7 | May 24, 2023 (digital) | 978-1-7183-3866-1 |
42. "An Archdemon's Dilemma: How to Love your Child Elf Bride ①"; 43. "An Archdemon's Dilemma: How to Love your Child Elf Bride ②"; 44. "An Archdemon's Dilemma: How to Love your Child Elf Bride ③"; 45. "An Archdemon's Dilemma: How to Love your Child Elf Bride ④"; 46. "An Archdemon's Dilemma: How to Love your Child Elf Bride ⑤"; Short Story; Bonus
| 10 | June 1, 2023 | 978-4-7986-3072-4 | December 11, 2023 (digital) | 978-1-7183-3868-5 |
47. "An Archdemon's Dilemma: How to Love your Child Elf Bride ⑥"; 48. "They Say No Child Knows How Dear They Are to Their Parents, but Parents Also Don't Understand the Feelings of Their Children ①"; 49. "They Say No Child Knows How Dear They Are to Their Parents, but Parents Also Don't Understand the Feelings of Their Children ②"; 50. "They Say No Child Knows How Dear They Are to Their Parents, but Parents Also Don't Understand the Feelings of Their Children ③"; 51. "It Appears Two People in Love Go on Dates, but What Do You Do on Them? ①"; Bonus
| 11 | December 1, 2023 | 978-4-7986-3261-2 | June 26, 2024 (digital) | 978-1-7183-3869-2 |
52. "It Appears Two People in Love Go on Dates, but What Do You Do on Them? ②"; 53. "It Appears Two People in Love Go on Dates, but What Do You Do on Them? ③"; 54. "When it Comes to a Date, Practice Makes Perfect ①"; 55. "When it Comes to a Date, Practice Makes Perfect ②"; 56. "When it Comes to a Date, Practice Makes Perfect ③"; 57. "When it Comes to a Date, Practice Makes Perfect ④"; Bonus
| 12 | June 3, 2024 | 978-4-7986-3543-9; 978-4-7986-3545-3 (SE) | May 21, 2025 (digital) | 978-1-7183-3870-8 |
58. "When it Comes to a Date, Practice Makes Perfect ⑤"; 59. "There Are Many Unexpected Kind People in the World, but There Are Also a Lot Who Aren't ①"; 60. "There Are Many Unexpected Kind People in the World, but There Are Also a Lot Who Aren't ②"; 61. "There Are Many Unexpected Kind People in the World, but There Are Also a Lot Who Aren't ③"; 62. "There Are Many Unexpected Kind People in the World, but There Are Also a Lot Who Aren't ④"; Bonus
| 13 | February 3, 2025 | 978-4-7986-3543-9 | November 5, 2025 (digital) | 978-1-7183-3871-5 |
63. "Loving Someone Is Troublesome and Causes Misunderstandings but Is Still a Good Thing ①"; 64. "Loving Someone Is Troublesome and Causes Misunderstandings but Is Still a Good Thing ②"; 65. "Loving Someone Is Troublesome and Causes Misunderstandings but Is Still a Good Thing ③"; 66. "Loving Someone Is Troublesome and Causes Misunderstandings but Is Still a Good Thing ④"; 67. "Loving Someone Is Troublesome and Causes Misunderstandings but Is Still a Good Thing ⑤"; Bonus
| 14 | October 1, 2025 | 978-4-7986-3919-2 | May 6, 2026 (digital) | 978-1-7183-3872-2 |
| 15 | May 1, 2026 | 978-4-7986-4177-5 | — | — |
| 16 | November 2, 2026 | 978-4-7986-4324-3 | — | — |

A spin-off manga by Momo Futaba titled An Archdemon's (Friend's) Dilemma: How to Love a Crybaby Knight (悪友の俺がポンコツ騎士を見てられないんだが、どう世話を焼きゃいい? ～まどめ外伝～, Akuyū no Ore ga Ponkotsu Kishi o Miterarenai nda ga, Dō Sewa o Yakya Ī?: Madome Gaiden; "A Villain's Dilemma: How to Not Meddle too Much with a Clumsy Holy Knight's Life") began serialization in the same website in December 2021. The series has been collected in three volumes as of June 3, 2024. During their Anime Expo 2023 panel, J-Novel Club announced that they licensed the spin-off manga.

| No. | Original release date | Original ISBN | English release date | English ISBN |
|---|---|---|---|---|
| 1 | November 1, 2022 | 978-4-7986-2991-9 | July 7, 2023 (digital) | 978-1-7183-3880-7 |
1. "An Archdemon's (Friend's) Dilemma: How to Babysit a Crybaby Knight"; 2. "They Say Your First Love Tastes Like Lemons, but the Crybaby's Tea Tasted Like Mud"; 3. "Sorcerers Are Often Called Brutes, but the Church Is No Better ①"; 4. "Sorcerers Are Often Called Brutes, but the Church Is No Better ②"; 5. "An Archangel Is Still a Girl, So She Can Get Embarrassed Too ①"; 6. "An Archangel Is Still a Girl, So She Can Get Embarrassed Too ②"; Bonus
| 2 | September 1, 2023 | 978-4-7986-3268-1 | February 26, 2025 (digital) | 978-1-7183-3881-4 |
7. "When the Crybaby Loses Focus, Her Destructive Tendencies Accelerate ①"; 8. "When the Crybaby Loses Focus, Her Destructive Tendencies Accelerate ②"; 9. "An Obstinate Mule's Affection Is Annoying, So It's Best Not to Get Involved ①"; 10. "An Obstinate Mule's Affection Is Annoying, So It's Best Not to Get Involved ②"; 11. "An Obstinate Mule's Affection Is Annoying, So It's Best Not to Get Involved ③"; 12. "An Obstinate Mule's Affection Is Annoying, So It's Best Not to Get Involved ④"; 13. "An Obstinate Mule's Affection Is Annoying, So It's Best Not to Get Involved ⑤"; Bonus
| 3 | June 3, 2024 | 978-4-7986-3546-0 | August 13, 2025 (digital) | 978-1-7183-3882-1 |
14. "Come to Me for Complicated Love Advice After You're Actually Aware It's Love ①"; 15. "Come to Me for Complicated Love Advice After You're Actually Aware It's Love ②"; 16. "A Crybaby Is Far Better than an Idiot ①"; 17. "A Crybaby Is Far Better than an Idiot ②"; 18. "Klutziness Is Cute, but Also Contagious ①"; Bonus

=== Anime ===
An anime television series adaptation was announced on October 27, 2022. Produced and planned by TMS Entertainment, and animated by Brain's Base, it is directed by Hiroshi Ishiodori, with Aya Yoshinaga overseeing series scripts, Mina Ōsawa designing the characters, Keiji Gotoh supervising the animation, Yuma Yamaguchi composing the music, and narrated by Toshiyuki Morikawa. The series aired from April 5 to June 21, 2024, on Tokyo MX and other networks. (Note: Tokyo MX lists the series premiere at 24:30 on April 4, 2024, which is effectively 12:30 a.m. JST on April 5.) The opening theme is "Wakaranai Ai" (ワカラナイアイ, "A Love I Can't Understand"), performed by The Brow Beat, while the ending theme is "Tweedia" (ブルースター, "Blue Star"), performed by Sayaka Yamamoto. Crunchyroll licensed the series. Plus Media Networks Asia licensed the series in Southeast Asia.

The anime covers the first 24 chapters of the Manga with an original episode as the finale.

==== Episodes ====
| No. | Title (Note: All English titles are taken from Crunchyroll.) | Directed by (Note: Information is taken from the ending credits of each episode.) | Written by | Storyboarded by | Original release date |
|---|---|---|---|---|---|
| 1 | "First Love Is Like a Nasty Disease That Everyone Catches Once"; Transliteration: "Hatsukoi to wa Dare Mo ga Ichi Do wa Kakaru Shitsu no Warui Yamaidearu." (Japanese: 初恋とは誰もが一度はかかる質の悪い病である。) | Hiroshi Ishiodori | Aya Yoshinaga | Haruka Kanbara | April 5, 2024 |
In the forest path that crosses the sorcerer Zagan's backyard, a young red-haired girl is attacked and about to be killed by a man who can change his face. Irritated at the disturbance, Zagan appears and easily kills the attacker, causing the girl to faint. Unsure what to do with her, he cleans up the mess he made and leaves her on the road for passing travelers to find. A neighboring sorcerer, Barbatos, appears and invites Zagan to join him as he visits the auction of an Archdemon who died recently. At the auction, it is revealed that the Archdemon had purchased a rare and gorgeous young elf girl as a slave and she was currently up for grabs, with a starting bid of ten thousand gold. Falling in love at first sight, Zagan immediately bids his entire fortune of one million gold and purchases her outright. Bringing her home he realizes he has no idea how to properly communicate with her and everything he says terrifies her. After repeatedly freaking her out with his curt speech and thunderous displays of power, and after reassuring her over and over again that he has no intentions of killing her or using her as a sacrifice, he prepares a room at the top of a tower, with a beautiful view of the entire countryside, for the elf girl to stay in.
| 2 | "First Love with Social Anxiety Tastes a Lot Like Moldy Bread"; Transliteration: "Komyushō no Hatsukoi wa Kabita Pan no Aji ni Niteiru" (Japanese: コミュ障の初恋はカビたパンの味に似ている) | Hiroshi Ishidori | Aya Yoshinaga | Kazue Komatsu | April 12, 2024 (Note: From Episode 2 onward, episodes are released on select platforms (such as ABEMA and Crunchyroll) one week before their air dates on television.) |
After a very bland breakfast, Zagan realizes he has no idea what normal people eat. Nephy offers to make him a homecook meal, and the 2 sets off to buy ingredients from a nearby town. Zagan realizes on the way that he spent all his money buying Nephy and debates on what to do when highwaymen attack the merchant carriage that was nearby, he defends it because of Nephy's request. In return he receives a hefty reward and is able to buy what he needs. He also found out the people were scared because of his facial expression but they knew he was not a bad sorcerer like the others since he saved a few of them.
| 3 | "The Quieter They Are, The More Devastatingly Scary They Are When They're Angry"; Transliteration: "Fudan Otonashī Ko Hodo Okoru to Hakai-teki ni Osoroshī" (Japanese: 普段おとなしい子ほど怒ると破壊的に恐ろしい) | Arisa Shima, Hiroshi Ishidori | Aya Yoshinaga | Hiroshi Ishidori | April 19, 2024 |
Chastille, the red-haired girl Zagan saved a while back, is revealed to be an Angelic Knight, as she and several others of her companions assault Zagan's castle. She knew he was not evil and the fight shakes her faith to her core even more. Zagan's unwilling to start stacking up bodies with Nephy around so he's mostly just on the defensive. When his hesitation puts him in danger, Nephy unleashes her strong innate powers to save him. The knights leave wounded and defeated leaving Chastille troubled by the events.
| 4 | "When An Archdemon Offers You Anything, You're Better Off Saying No"; Transliteration: "Maō Kara no Kanyū toka Rokuna Koto ni Naranai kara, Kotowatta Kata ga Īi" (Japanese: 魔王からの勧誘とかロクなことにならないから、断った方がいい) | Shizuka Sugawara | Aya Yoshinaga | Minoru Ōhara | April 26, 2024 |
After the battle, Nephy takes care of Zagan. He finds out that her powers extend to healing as his injuries are gone. Zagan decides to take her on as an apprentice. Especially after a visit from another sorcerer, he confirms it. However, after being summoned by the 12 Archdemons and offered the position as the 13th Archdemon, he doubts he can give her a normal life and fears the other Archdemons will want to harm her, so he breaks the collar around her neck and tells her to leave. Nephy, heartbroken and betrayed, sits alone in the dark alleyway pondering what to do.
| 5 | "Heartbreak Can Be Literally, Physically Painful"; Transliteration: "Shitsuren to Iu no wa Butsuri-teki ni mo Kekkō Itai Mono de" (Japanese: 失恋というのは物理的にもけっこう痛いもので) | Kazue Komatsu | Shingo Irie | Hiroshi Ishodori | May 3, 2024 |
Devastated and alone, Nephy is found in the village by the people of Kianoides. Chastille is the first one to interact with her which leads to the villagers misunderstanding her intentions and thinking she was bullying her. They eventually figure out what happened with Zagan and then realize he was trying to protect Nephy. As she was about to go back to him she is abducted along with Chastille by a Zagan impostor. A friend of Nephy goes and warn Zagan and he knew exactly who it was. It was his supposed friend Barbatos who was jealous that Zagan had defeated his master and that he thought all the power, money, and castle as well as the Archdemon title should belong to him as in his thinks he deserved it more. Zagan appears as Barbatos was about to attack Nephy.
| 6 | "If You're An Archdemon, You're Almost Obligated To Act Outrageously"; Transliteration: "Maō ni Natta kara ni wa Bōjakubujin ni Furumai Gimu-mitai na Mono ga aru" (Japanese: 魔王になったからには傍若無人に振る舞いみたいなものがある) | Hiroshi Ishiodori | Aya Yoshinaga | Hiroshi Ishidori | May 10, 2024 |
Zagan has arrived to face Barbatos and save Nephy, in turn also saving Chastille. The battle does not last long as Zagan reveals he knew Barbatos was the one behind everything what was happening close to the village in the recent time as he was the only one who could easily get through his security. He also kept showing to Zagan after something happen which made Zagan even more suspicious of him. But, it allowed him to study his opponents magic easily and defeat him badly. An unfortunate interaction with Zagan's magic and Barbatos' summoning circle happened and a demon of incredible power was summoned unintentionally and surprisingly. Zagan's crest as an Archdemon react and the demon obeyed him. Zagan just sent it back and went home making sure everyone was okay after the cave collapsed. Barbatos left after promising to bring him good booze.
| 7 | "Even An Archdemon Should Know Better Than To Hit A Child"; Transliteration: "Maō Datte Chisai Ko Ni Te o Ageru no wa Yokunai" (Japanese: 魔王だって小さい子に手をあげるのは良くない) | Shigeru Ueda | Shingo Irie | Koichi О̄hata | May 17, 2024 |
Chastille abdicates her role at the church because she does not want to hunt down Zagan. The priest say he would protect her the best he can since the sword chooses the wielder and does not believe it made a mistake. For comes to challenge Zagan while he's eating which made him very angry and knocks out the intruder just to discover it was only a dragonoid child. He decides to make her help Nephy with her task as punishment. Eventually, he offers to take her under his protection so she will not be hunted down, and she could keep having a place to live and help out.
| 8 | "I Found a Dragon and I Guess She's My Daughter Now"; Transliteration: "Ryū o Hirottara Natsukareta node Musume ni Suru Koto ni Shita" (Japanese: 竜を拾ったら懐かれたので娘にすることにした) | Shizuki Sugawara | Shingo Irie | Shizuki Sugawara | May 24, 2024 |
Zagan, Nephy and For investigate Marchosias's old estate. He discover where he saw his crest. A veteran sacred sword wielder arrives. He challenges Chastille to take up her sword again or die as the sword is useless without her and she needs to serve her purpose or else. She keeps challenging him but decides to take up her sword even if it is to go against him. Zagan is drinking and talking with Barbatos when they get interrupted by the veteran.
| 9 | "The Angelic Knight Situation Sounds Like a Mess I'd Rather Not Get Involved In"; Transliteration: "Hijiri Kishi no Jijo wa Dorodoro Shiteiru Node Kakawaritakunai no Daga" (Japanese: 聖騎士の事情はドロドロしているので関わりたくないのだが) | Takafumi Fūjī | Aya Yoshinaga | Koichi Ōhata | May 31, 2024 |
Zagan and Barbatos encounter the veteran Raphael while drinking and a warning is issued. When Chastille's life is endangered, Zagan offers her shelter. For and Chastille keep fighting since it was a sacred sword wielder that killed For's parents. Zagan tells For to go after the actual killer not the others as it would not satisfy her otherwise. He even offers to help. Chastille on the other hand has a hard time getting used to life in the castle.
| 10 | "Of Course Parents Panic When Their Daughter Runs Away From Home"; Transliteration: "Musume ni Ie Desaretara Oya to Shite wa Hisshi ni Naru Mono de." (Japanese: 娘に家出されたら親としては必死になるもので) | Shigeru Ueda | Aya Yoshinaga | Minoru Ōhara | June 7, 2024 |
For leaves to investigate the old Archdemon's castle in order to find weapons to wield in her quest for revenge. However, before she can enter the estate she is beset by Raphael. Zagan intervenes in time to rescue For. Raphael loses his will to fight when he finds out who For's father was. A demon protector of the castle appears and Zagan has trouble controlling it. It attacks For but Raphael protects her. The demon is dispatched.
| 11 | "It's Still Apparently an Angelic Knight's Duty To Slay Wicked Beasts"; Transliteration: "Sore Demo Jāku-na Mamono o Yattsukeru no ga Hijiri Kishi-rashī" (Japanese: それでも邪悪な魔物をやっつけるのが聖騎士らしい) | Kazue Komatsu | Aya Yoshinaga | Koichi Ōhata | June 14, 2024 |
| 12 | "Music At Night Is Lovely, But May Be Too Much When You're Socially Awkward"; Transliteration: "Tsukiyo no Ongakukai wa Utsukushī ga, Komyushō ni wa Mada Hayai" (Japanese: 月夜の音楽会は美しいが、コミュ障にはまだ早い) | Hiroshi Ishidori | Aya Yoshinaga | Hiroshi Ishidori | June 21, 2024 |

== Reception ==
In 2020, the manga adaptation was nominated for the Next Manga Award in the web category.
