= I Saved Too Many Girls and Caused the Apocalypse =

Japanese light novel series

俺がヒロインを助けすぎて世界がリトル黙示録〈アポカリプス〉!? (Ore ga Hiroin o Tasukesugite Sekai ga Ritoru Apokaripusu!?)
- Genre: Romance, Fantasy
- Light novel
- Written by: Namekojirushi
- Illustrated by: Nao Watanuki
- Published by: Hobby Japan
- English publisher: NA: J-Novel Club
- Imprint: HJ Bunko
- Original run: June 1, 2011 – May 31, 2016
- Volumes: 16
- Manga
- Written by: Namekojirushi
- Illustrated by: Kouji Hasegawa
- Published by: Hobby Japan
- Magazine: Comic Dangan
- Original run: December 2, 2011 – January 31, 2014
- Volumes: 5

I Saved Too Many Girls and Caused the Apocalypse (俺がヒロインを助けすぎて世界がリトル黙示録!?, Ore ga Hiroin o Tasukesugite Sekai ga Ritoru Apokaripusu!?) is a Japanese light novel series written by Namekojirushi and illustrated by Nao Watanuki, which has been published by Hobby Japan under their HJ Bunko imprint since June 2011.

A manga adaptation drawn by Kouji Hasegawa was serialized in Comic Dangan. J-Novel Club has licensed the novels in North America.

== Plot ==
Rekka Namidare was a normal boy until his sixteenth birthday. Then a girl suddenly appears from his future, warning him that he'll somehow start an interstellar war! It turns out Rekka hails from a special bloodline that's destined to get caught up in all kinds of trouble. Whenever a story's heroine is in dire need, Rekka will be given one last chance to save her. And in the future, Rekka will have saved so many girls that their zealous love for him will cause the apocalypse!

== Characters ==
Rekka Namidare (波乱烈火, Namidare Rekka)
Harissa Hope (ハリッサ・ホウプ, Hope Harissa)
Satsuki Otomo (大友 皐, Otomo Satsuki)
Iris Pheneritas Psyfacor (イリス・フィネリタス・サイファーコール, Psyfacor Pheneritas Iris)
R (アール, R)
Jigen Namidare (ジニックナミダレ, Namidare Jigen)

== Media ==
=== Light novel ===
The light novels are written by Namekojirushi and illustrated by Nao Watanuki, and are published by Hobby Japan. Online English light novel publisher J-Novel Club announced their acquisition of the series on October 28, 2016.
