= Hyakka Ryōran =

Japanese light novel series and its franchise

- First light novel cover, featuring Muneakira Yagyu (back) and Jubei Yagyu (front)

百花繚乱 SAMURAI GIRLS (Hyakka Ryōran Samurai Gāruzu)
- Genre: Action, comedy, harem
- Light novel
- Written by: Akira Suzuki
- Illustrated by: Niθ
- Published by: Hobby Japan
- Imprint: HJ Bunko
- Original run: February 28, 2009 – January 26, 2014
- Volumes: 17
- Manga

Hyakka Ryōran: Sengoku Maidens
- Illustrated by: Yura Shinano
- Published by: ASCII Media Works
- Magazine: Dengeki Daioh
- Original run: December 18, 2009 – March 27, 2011
- Volumes: 3
- Manga
- Written by: Akira Suzuki (original story)
- Illustrated by: Niθ (original designs); Junichi Iwasaki
- Published by: Media Factory
- Magazine: Monthly Comic Alive
- Original run: June 1, 2010 – present
- Volumes: 2
- Anime television series

Samurai Girls
- Directed by: KOBUN
- Produced by: Hisato Usui; Ryūji Sekine; Shinsaku Tanaka; Takuro Hatakeyama
- Written by: Ryunosuke Kingetsu
- Music by: Tatsuya Kato
- Studio: Arms
- Licensed by: AUS: Madman Entertainment; NA: Sentai Filmworks; UK: Kazé UK/Manga Entertainment
- Original network: Chiba TV, tvk, TV Saitama, Tokyo MX, TV Aichi, Sun TV, AT-X
- English network: NA: Anime Network
- Original run: September 4, 2010 – December 20, 2010
- Episodes: 12
- Manga

Hyakka Ryōran: Seven Spears
- Written by: Akira Suzuki (original story)
- Illustrated by: Niθ (original designs); Tatara Yano
- Published by: Hobby Japan
- Magazine: Comic Dangan
- Original run: December 23, 2011 – present
- Volumes: 2
- Anime television series

Samurai Bride
- Directed by: KOBUN
- Produced by: Makoto Itō; Osamu Koshinaka; Ryūji Sekine; Takuro Hatakeyama
- Written by: Satoru Nishizono
- Music by: Tatsuya Kato
- Studio: Arms
- Licensed by: AUS: Madman Entertainment; NA: Sentai Filmworks; UK: Manga Entertainment
- Original network: AT-X, Chiba TV, Tokyo MX, Sun TV, TV Aichi, BS11
- English network: NA: Anime Network
- Original run: April 5, 2013 – June 21, 2013
- Episodes: 12
- Original video animation

Samurai After
- Directed by: Toshinori Fukushima
- Produced by: Masaaki Yokota; Yūsuke Yanagisawa
- Written by: Masahiro Ōkubo
- Music by: Tatsuya Kato
- Studio: Arms
- Released: January 23, 2015 – July 1, 2015
- Runtime: 25–26 minutes (each)
- Episodes: 2
- icon

Hyakka Ryōran: Samurai Girls (Japanese: 百花繚乱 SAMURAI GIRLS, Hepburn: Hyakka Ryōran Samurai Gāruzu; shortened to Samurai Girls) (Note: "Hyakka Ryōran" (百花繚乱) is a Japanese phrase meaning "Countless flowers blooming in profusion". In this case, though, it means "A gathering of many beautiful and talented women".) (Note: In the anime, katakana is used in place of the English subtitle for "Samurai Girls".) is a Japanese light novel series written by Akira Suzuki with illustrations by Niθ to commemorate Hobby Japan's 40th anniversary. The first volume was released by Hobby Japan on February 28, 2009, with 17 volumes currently available in Japan under their HJ Bunko imprint. There are currently three different manga adaptations based on the Hyakka Ryoran universe published. An online anthology comic was serialized on Hobby Japan's media website Hobby Channel from June 1, 2010, and sold two volumes as of June 2011; a manga adaptation illustrated by Junichi Iwasaki began serialization in the November 2010 issue of Monthly Comic Alive; and another manga adaptation by Tatara Yano began serialization in Hobby Japan's online manga magazine Comic Dangan on December 23, 2011. A spinoff manga called Hyakka Ryōran: Sengoku Maidens, illustrated by Yuri Shinano, was serialized in the March 2009 issue of Dengeki Daioh and ended in the March 2011 issue, and released three volumes as of March 2012.

A 12-episode anime adaptation produced by Arms aired on Chiba TV and other networks from October 2010 to December 2010. A second anime season aired from April to June 2013. At Anime Expo 2010, Hobby Japan announced that they are planning to release the light novels in North America in the near future.

The series is loosely based on the Sengoku period or early Edo period of Japan, despite being set in the present day.

== Plot ==
The series takes place in an alternate version of Japan called Great Japan (大日本国, Dai Nippon-koku), in an alternate timeline where the Tokugawa shogunate remained active and has remained semi isolated from the rest of the world after their defeat by American forces in World War II. And the Americans have bases on Okinawa and southern great Japan. The story takes place at Buou Academic School (武應学園塾, Buō Gakuen-juku), an academy located at the base of Mount Fuji where children of military families train to become samurai warriors. The academy is in the middle of a power struggle between Yukimura Sanada and Matabei Goto of the Toyotomi faction and the powerful student council that rules the school, and Muneakira Yagyu, the owner of the Yagyu Dojo, and the mysterious Jubei Yagyu are dragged in the middle of the conflict.

The series features the female warriors descended from the famous historical figures from Japan's Sengoku period and early Edo period. The character Charles d'Artagnan also comes from the same age in Europe.

== Characters ==
=== Main characters ===
Jubei Yagyu (柳生 十兵衛 三厳, Yagyū Jūbei Mitsuyoshi; "Mitsuyoshi Jubei Yagyu")
Voiced by: Aoi Yūki (Japanese); Emily Neves (English)
The heroine of the series and Muneakira's first Master Samurai, with the contractual mark on her chest. According to Hattori, when she transforms she has a power level of five million. The transformation causes her eyes to turn amber with vertical slits, and in this state she is an honorable warrior who gives respect to those who have earned it but also appears to have a sadistic side. In her normal form, she has no memories of her former life and is obsessed with Muneakira whom she has referred to as "onii-chan" (big brother) from the very first moments of their meeting. She is airheaded, innocent, and acts very much like a child, which is reinforced by the fact that she refers to herself in third-person. Her weapon is a daishō set, with an unusually colored katana. She does not need to chant a phrase in order to transform; she only transforms when she kisses Muneakira or when she experiences very strong feelings. Initially, during her transformations Muneakira would find himself bound by chains of unknown origin that were later revealed to be his powers as a General not yet being fully developed.

It's revealed that Jubei's Master Samurai state is her true self; her current personality having been created by an incomplete contract. Jubei's inner self warns Jubei that kissing Muneakira once more will complete the contract at the cost of her innocent persona. In her final battle, Jubei sacrifices herself to defeat Gisen. However, after the credits of the DVD/Blu-ray release it is shown that she returns to once again share a kiss with Muneakira.

During the second season, it's discovered that Jubei can no longer transform into a Master Samurai since the inner Jubei died as a result of her battle with Gisen. As she trains with Keiji, inner Jubei returns. Jubei is the only one of Muneakira's Master Samurai who completes the Samurai Bride contract, thus becoming a Samurai Bride.

Muneakira Yagyu (柳生 宗朗, Yagyū Muneakira)
Voiced by: Daisuke Hirakawa (Japanese); David Matranga (English)
The protagonist of the series and a childhood friend of Sen, he has the ability, unknown even to him, to create Master Samurai. This power first manifested when he and the naked girl who fell from the sky kissed. He has since gained six additional Master Samurai with one of them becoming a Samurai Bride.

Yukimura Sanada (真田 幸村, Sanada Yukimura)
Voiced by: Rie Kugimiya (Japanese); Hilary Haag (English)
A 15-year-old first year high school student with an underdeveloped body who is the leader of the Toyotomi faction. She is Muneakira's second Master Samurai, with the mark of wisdom on her left butt cheek. Her weapons are a pair of huge battle fans capable of manipulating wind and can also use them to block enemy attacks. Initially, she has almost no control over her powers when she is in her Master Samurai state, though she improves as the series progresses. She also seems to have feelings for Muneakira. In season one her transformation phrase is "Fushaku Shinmyo", which means "Self-sacrificing Dedication". During season two, she is able to transform into a Master Samurai at will. Jubei's nickname for Yukimura is "Yukki" (ゆっきー, Yukkī).

Sen Tokugawa (徳川 千, Tokugawa Sen)
Voiced by: Minako Kotobuki (Japanese); Luci Christian (English)
Muneakira's childhood friend and the eldest daughter of the Tokugawa Shogunate. She seems to have feelings for Muneakira, and acts very much like a tsundere towards him. She is a self-proclaimed spoiled princess and always seeks to get her way regarding any decision she wants to make. She gets extremely jealous of any girl who tries to get close to Muneakira, and generally acts upon this jealousy by flying into a rage. Later, she reveals her true feelings to Muneakira and kisses him, thus becoming his third Master Samurai. Her weapon is a naginata decorated near the blade, and her transformation phrase is "Tenga Ryūrei", which means "Elegant Beauty". In the second season she is able to transform into a Master Samurai at will with no phrase required. Sen's attacks usually involve thunder or lightning.

Sasuke (佐助)
Voiced by: Chinatsu Akasaki (Japanese); Adele Dazeem (English)
Yukimura's pet monkey. She is very fond of Jubei who can speak Monkey. She gains the ability to become human when she accidentally kisses Muneakira and becomes his Fourth Master Samurai. In human form she has long blonde hair and is partially covered in fur. She changes back into a monkey when she is tired. Despite her rivalry with Kanetsugu, she is shown to care deeply for Kanetsugu to the point of sacrificing herself to protect Kanetsugu.

Kanetsugu Naoe (直江 兼続, Naoe Kanetsugu)
Voiced by: Aki Toyosaki (Japanese); Rozie Curtis (English)
Kanetsugu is the self-proclaimed "Warrior of Love" and one of Yukimura's childhood friends. Yukimura humiliated her when they were both younger and Kanetsugu still carries a grudge because of it. Kanetsugu was sent by Sen's brother, Yoshihiko, to spy on Sen and Yukimura's actions. Her speech pattern is notable as she uses keigo. At one point in the series she feels that she is a liability to the dojo and decides to sneak away during the night, but ends up getting ambushed by Araki Mataemon. After he defeats her, Mataemon throws Kanetsugu into a street canal the moment Muneakira arrives looking for her. Rescuing an unconscious and critically wounded Kanetsugu, Muneakira proceeds to resuscitate her by performing CPR while crying at the thought of losing her should he fail. Muneakira's emotional state connects with Kanetsugu's dying state at a spiritual level, forming a new bond between the two of them which changes his next attempt at CPR into a contract kiss and turning Kanetsugu into Muneakira's Fifth Master Samurai. Her weapon is a decorated sledgehammer capable of knocking heavy gates and creating fissures when slammed down to the ground. Jubei's nicknames for Kanetsugu are "Gutsugutsu" (ぐつぐつ), "Gucchan" (ぐっちゃん), and "Gucchorinado" (ぐっちょりなど). Kanetsugu's appearance oddly resembles that of Vocaloid Hatsune Miku. Her favorite food is leek, also like Miku.

Matabei Goto (後藤 又兵衛, Gotō Matabee)
Voiced by: Yū Kobayashi (Japanese); Shelley Calene-Black (English)
Yukimura's bodyguard and loyal samurai, she wears a fundoshi. Her favored weapon is a yari but she also uses a small tantō that she wears as a hair accessory. She seems to have a weakness for hot baths, as seen when she eagerly attempted to enter one as "punishment" from Hanzo. She possess a superhuman sense of smell. She later becomes Muneakira's sixth Master Samurai. In master samurai mode her weapon becomes a giant brush with a retractable spear head. Jubei's nickname for Matabei is "Beta-san" (べーたさん).

Hanzo Hattori (服部 半蔵 美成, Hattori Hanzō Yoshinari; "Yoshinari Hanzo Hattori")
Voiced by: Saori Gotō (Japanese); Maggie Flecknoe (English)
Sen's servant and head of the Student Council police who wears a maid's outfit and glasses. It is hinted that she has deeper feelings for Sen and is a masochist, who longs for Sen's abuses. Her weapon is a double-bladed pole that can split into two individual katana, and she can shoot a number of shuriken, kunai or any throwable material from under her skirt. Her glasses allow her to detect an individual's power level and also see through any man-made material. She later becomes Muneakira's seventh Master Samurai. In master samurai she uses a holographic display in lieu of her glasses to detect an opponent's power level plus their Qi level. Her weapon is a giant scroll on her back that can split into various three-sided shurikans.

=== Toyotomi faction ===
The Toyotomi Faction (豊臣方, Toyotomi-hō) is a faction of the academy dedicated to overthrow the Tokugawa Shogunate and bring a new era to Great Japan. Yukimura and Matabei are also members of this faction.

Katsunaga Mori (毛利 勝永, Mōri Katsunaga)

Morichika Chosokabe (長曽我部 元親, Chōsokabe Morichika)

Takenori Akashi (明石 全登, Akashi Takenori)

=== Buou Student Council ===
Yoshihiko Tokugawa (徳川 慶彦, Tokugawa Yoshihiko)
Voiced by: Takahiro Sakurai (Japanese); Leraldo Anzaldua (English)
Sen's older brother, president of the Student Council, and head of the Tokugawa Shogunate. He believes that he is doing the best for his country, when in reality he is a ruthless tyrant with a tendency to use and discard people, including his own sister. Yoshihiko had a brief relationship with Charles d'Artagnan until he used her in one of his experiments to create Master Samurai by artificial means. He has also used other girls (who were, in fact, descendants of former Master Samurai) in his experiments, planning to create an army of Master Samurai since there are so few of them in existence. Realizing his feelings for d'Artagnan after she sacrifices herself to save him, he revives her by making a Master Samurai contract with her, and later teams up with Muneakira to defeat Gisen.

His other Master Samurai are able to use magic to create barriers but very little is known about them.

Charles d'Artagnan (シャルル・ド・ダルタニアン, Sharuru do Darutanian)
Voiced by: Ami Koshimizu (Japanese); Shannon Emerick (English)
Nicknamed Nia (ニア), d'Artagnan is a tall blonde woman from France who transferred to Buou Academy. She met Yoshihiko while she was doing origami, and developed a romantic relationship in him. However, she was betrayed when Yoshihiko used her as a test subject to create Master Samurai by artificial means. Despite that he has done to her, she still has feelings for Yoshihiko, as seen in the anime and novels when she dies protecting Yoshihiko from falling rubble while holding an origami samurai's helmet that Yoshihiko had given her in the past. She was later revived by Yoshihiko and becomes a true Master Samurai with the contractual mark on her left hand.

d'Artagnan's powers as a Master Samurai allow her to channel different elements. However, because her Master Samurai powers were created artificially, her body suffers great strain from using her powers. Also, her aura differs from the other Master Samurai (sans Gisen), as it is violet as opposed to the standard black. She wields twin claymores as weapons, utilizing them to create elemental-powered attacks.

Takamori Matsudaira (松平 尊保, Matsudaira Takamori)

=== Hatamoto Student Council ===
The Hatamoto Student Council (旗本生徒会, Hatamoto Seitokai) is a faction of Buou Academy's Student Council serving directly under Yoshihiko.

Masamune Date (伊達 政宗, Date Masamune)

Kojuro Katakura (片倉 小十郎 景綱, Katakura Kojūrō Kagetsuna; "Kagetsuna Kojuro Katakura")

Takatora Todo (藤堂 高虎, Tōdō Takatora)

Naotaka Ii (井伊 直孝, Ii Naotaka)

Tadaoki Hozokawa (細川 忠興, Hozokawa Tadaoki)

=== Anti-Tokugawa faction ===
The Anti-Tokugawa Faction (反徳川) is a faction led by Shiro Amakusa. Their main purpose is to destroy the Tokugawa Shogunate by any means possible.

Shiro Amakusa (天草 四郎 時貞, Amakusa Shirō Tokisada; "Tokisada Shiro Amakusa")
Gisen Yagyu (柳生 義仙, Yagyū Gisen)
Voiced by: Kaoru Mizuhara (Japanese); Melissa Davis (Season 1), Jessica Boone (Season 2) (English)
The series' main antagonist. Gisen is a young girl sporting an eyepatch over her right eye who falls naked from the sky into Muneakira's arms, much like Jubei did. She is initially friendly and demure, but is shown to be very perverse when around Muneakira (whom she refers to as "Master"). She is continually trying to "tuck" a certain part of his body between her breasts; the reason being is that she thinks that the relationship between a general and a samurai is similar to that of a master and slave. Jubei nickname for Gisen is "Gittan", and Gisen refers to Jubei as "onee-sama" (big sister).

It is later revealed that she is a Master Samurai, with the contractual mark on her right eye. Her general is Amakusa Shirō, a powerful samurai who once aspired to destroy Japan until he was killed by a group of rebels. She intends to revive him to destroy Japan once more. Her true personality is also revealed throughout the story, revealing her as a highly sadistic person who will stop at nothing to ensure her general's revival; she even attempted to take Jubei's body into her own to further the process. Her transformation phrase is "Inka Ryōran", which means "Indecent Flower Blooming Profusely", and her attacks usually involve ice. Gisen's right eye (colored red) can control and manipulate people's minds, and she wields a blade that can turn into a scissor-like weapon.

Shosetsu Yui (由比 正雪, Yui Shōsetsu)

Musashi Miyamoto (宮本 武蔵, Miyamoto Musashi)
Voiced by: Yōko Hikasa (Japanese); Molly Searcy (English)
A hotblooded but honorable warrior who likes to fight strong opponents which is her main motivation. She is particularly interested in fighting anyone who can wield two swords like herself. She has pink hair, wears a simple tan uniform with a pair of headphones around her neck, and also fights using a daishō set. Her headphones are used to counteract her artificial ears, which hear unnecessary things, while she is in a serious battle. She possesses artificial ears due to being resurrected improperly. She is the leader of the four Dark Samurai. She was given the nickname Mucchan by Jubei.

Kojiro Sasaki (佐々木 小次郎, Sasaki Kojirō)
Voiced by: Naomi Shindō (Japanese); Cynthia Martinez (English)
One of the four Dark Samurai, she relies upon her intellect as often as her physical strength. Although she is drawn to fighting strong opponents, she doesn't favor a true state of war as she may not be able to tell her enemies from her allies. Physically, she has long purple hair with a fair white complexion to her skin. She wears a black kimono with a simple white floral design on her right shoulder, sleeve ends, and lower portion. Due to being resurrected improperly, her eyes won't recover completely so she is able to see all sorts of things. Using her power, which is often signified by a black piece of equipment placed over her eyes, she is able to filter out the unnecessary items from her sight.

Mataemon Araki (荒木 又右衛門, Araki Mataemon)
Voiced by: Haruka Tomatsu (Japanese); Rozie Pucker (English)
A boyish girl with a foul mouth. She has orange hair tied back with a band and wears an unbuttoned shirt. Her arm bandages are revealed to be hiding artificial body parts due to a mistake during her revival. Due to this, she is less "human" than any of the other Dark Samurai and is able to be manipulated. She wields a giant cleaver in battle. She is one of the four Dark Samurai.

Inshun Hōzōin (宝蔵院 胤舜, Hōzōin Inshun)
Voiced by: Satomi Satou (Japanese); Margaret McDonald (English)
A reserved loli type character with blue hair, fair skin who wears a black top over a white shirt, shorts, black boots and red gloves. She always has her circular shield worn on her back and wields a spear in battle. She often uses black crows and can seemingly talk to them. The flaw she possesses from her imperfect resurrection is that she always wears a black machine on her throat which is actually what speaks for her. She herself has always been pretending to talk normally. She is one of the four Dark Samurai. Her nickname is Inko-chan which was given to her by Jubei.

=== Other characters ===
Keiji Maeda (前田 慶次, Maeda Keiji)
Voiced by: Mamiko Noto (Japanese); Monica Rial (English)
Keiji is a wandering samurai who despises men. She is a master of Qi, a master of disguise, and also wields an umbrella in battle. As a childhood friend of Kanetsugu, Keiji has taken her appearance to initially teach the girls how to use Qi. Her hatred for men led her to refuse to teach Muneakira how to use Qi. Her method of choice for long-distance transport is by motorcycle. Her nickname "Maedake" was given to her by Jubei.

Kagekatsu Uesugi (上杉 景勝, Uesugi Kagekatsu)
Voiced by: Maaya Uchida
Kagekatsu is a samurai who trains with Keiji Maeda for the use of Qi. She is very jealous when Keiji visits Yagyu Dojo. She uses as weapons a bow and arrow. Her nickname "Kagenu" was given to her by Keiji.

== Media ==
=== Light novels ===
Written by Akira Suzuki and illustrated by Niθ, the first volume of Samurai Girls was released on February 28, 2009, by Hobby Japan, with a total of 17 volumes released under their HJ Bunko imprint.

At Anime Expo 2010, Hobby Japan announced they will release English translations of the novels in North America along with the Queen's Blade and Queen's Blade Rebellion game books in the near future in an effort to expand their business. They have stated they will release the series digitally through Apple's iBookstore and Amazon's Kindle store before releasing them in print, which will in turn include figurines of the characters. However, no light novels have been released following the announcement.

=== Manga ===
An anthology comic was serialized on Hobby Japan's online website Hobby Channel. The first chapter was serialized on June 1, 2010, with new chapters serialized on the 25th of each month. The first volume was published on November 25, 2010, and the second volume published on June 25, 2011.

A spinoff manga called Hyakka Ryōran: Sengoku Maidens (〜百花繚乱〜戦国乙女, ~Hyakka Ryōran~ Sengoku Otome), illustrated by Yura Shinano, began serialization in the March 2009 issue of Dengeki Daioh, and ended in the March 2011 issue. The first volume was released by ASCII Media Works on December 28, 2009, with the third volume released on March 27, 2012, under their Dengeki Comics imprint. Although the series uses the Hyakka Ryōran name, it is based on the Sengoku Otome pachinko games by Heiwa, and therefore has no connection to the original series.

A manga adaptation illustrated by Junichi Iwasaki began serialization in the November 2010 issue of Media Factory's manga magazine Monthly Comic Alive. The first volume was published on November 22, 2010, with a total of two volumes available as of October 22, 2011 under their Alive Comics imprint.

A second manga adaptation, called Hyakka Ryōran: Seven Spears (百花繚乱 セブン・スピア, Hyakka Ryōran: Sebun Supia), illustrated by Tatara Yano, began serialization Hobby Japan's online manga magazine Comic Dangan on December 23, 2011. The first volume was released on August 27, 2012, under their Dangan Comics imprint.

=== Internet radio show ===
An internet radio show produced by Lantis called Hyakka Ryōran: Radio Girls (百花繚乱 ラジオガールズ, Hyakka Ryōran: Rajio Gāruzu) aired between September 17, 2010, and January 10, 2011. The show was hosted by Aoi Yūki and Minako Kotobuki, the voices for Jubei Yagyu and Sen Tokugawa, respectively. There are four parts, or corners, to each episode. Certain episodes featured guest voices from the anime series, and listeners can send in comments of the show on the air. A CD of the radio show, called Hyakka Ryōran: Super Radio Girls (百花繚乱 スーパーラジオガールズ, Hyakka Ryōran: Sūpā Rajio Gāruzu), was released on January 26, 2011, by Lantis.

=== Anime ===
An anime adaptation produced by Arms and directed by KOBUN was announced on the fourth volume of the light novels. The series ran twelve episodes between October 4 and December 20, 2010, on Chiba TV and TV Kanagawa, with later broadcasts on TV Saitama, Tokyo MX, TV Aichi, Sun Television, and AT-X. A preview of the first episode aired on Tokyo MX on September 4, 2010, prior to the official airing. The series serves as an alternate telling of the light novels, having a completely different storyline. Simulcasts were provided in North America by Anime Network on their video portal, and in Australia and New Zealand by Madman Entertainment. Six DVD and Blu-ray volumes were released by Media Factory between November 25, 2010, and April 28, 2011, each containing an OVA short called Hyakka Ryōran Samurai Girls: Blushing Maidens in the Pact (百花繚乱 サムライガールズ 〜乙女♥嬉し恥ずかし将士の契り〜, Hyakka Ryōran Samurai Gāruzu ~Otome Ureshi Hazukashi Shōshi no Chigiri~) and a voiced 4-koma illustrated by Chiruo Kazahana. A Blu-ray box set was released on February 27, 2013.

Samurai Girls is licensed in North America by Sentai Filmworks, and distributor Section23 Films released the series with an English dub (produced by Seraphim Digital) on August 23, 2011, on DVD and Blu-ray. The anime is also licensed in Australia and New Zealand by Madman Entertainment, and in the United Kingdom by Kazé. The English dub of the anime premiered on Anime Network's video portal on June 23, 2011, and ran until September 8, 2011.

The opening theme for the series is "Last vision for last" by Faylan, while the ending theme is "Koi ni Sesse Tooryanse" (恋にせっせ通りゃんせ) by Aoi Yūki, Minako Kotobuki, and Rie Kugimiya, the voices for Jubei Yagyu, Sen Tokugawa, and Yukimura Sanada, respectively.

A second anime season, titled Hyakka Ryōran: Samurai Bride (百花繚乱 サムライブライド, Hyakka Ryōran Samurai Buraido), was announced on the twelfth volume of the light novels, and began airing on April 5, 2013. The opening theme for the second season is "AI DO." by Miyuki Hashimoto and the ending theme is "Kekka, Guuzen de Gozasourou" (結果、偶然でござ候) by Yūki, Kotobuki and Kugimiya. As with the first season, the second season has been licensed by Sentai Filmworks.

All two seasons of the series are available on the HIDIVE streaming service.

=== Music ===
"Last vision for last" was released as a maxi single by Lantis on October 27, 2010. The single features a song called "From Quiet Nectar to Red Nectar" (しずかな蜜より赤い蜜), as well as instrumentals of both songs. A CD single for "Koi ni Sesse Tooryanse" was released by Lantis on November 10, 2010, featuring a song called "Hanasaku Samurai Love" (ハナサク☆サムライラブ, Hanasaku☆Samurai Rabu; "The Samurai Love of Blooming"). A character song CD called Hyakka Ryoran Samurai Girls Character Song Station: Samurai the Show!! (百花繚乱 サムライガールズ CSステーション -SAMURAI THE SHOW!!-, Hyakka Ryōran Samurai Gāruzu CS Sutēshon -SAMURAI THE SHOW!!-) was released by Lantis on December 8, 2010, featuring songs sung by Yū Kobayashi, Saori Gotō, Aoi Yūki, Rie Kugimiya, and Minako Kotobuki. An original soundtrack called Hyakka Ryōran Samurai Girls Original Soundtrack: Body, Mind and Soul (百花繚乱 サムライガールズ オリジナル・サウンドトラック ～沁・伎・躰～) was released by Lantis on December 22, 2010, on a two-disc set.

=== Video game ===
A role-playing game, Hyakka Ryōran: Passion World (百花繚乱パッションワールド, Hyakka Ryōran Passhon Wārudo), was released on the HTML5 game platform, G123, in 2022.
