= Idolmaster: Xenoglossia =

2007 anime

- アイドルマスター XENOGLOSSIA
- Genre: Action, Comedy drama, Mecha, Sci-fi
- Created by: Namco Bandai Games (concept); Hajime Yatate (story)
- Developed by: Jukki Hanada
- Directed by: Tatsuyuki Nagai
- Music by: Tsuneyoshi Saito
- Country of origin: Japan
- Original language: Japanese
- No. of episodes: 26

Production
- Producers: Naotake Furusato; Toyota Todoroki
- Production companies: Sunrise; Bandai Visual

Original release
- Network: TVh, KTV, Chiba TV, TVS, tvk, TVQ, CTV
- Release: April 2 – September 22, 2007

Idolmaster: Xenoglossia (アイドルマスター XENOGLOSSIA, Aidorumasutā: Xenoglossia) is a 26-episode anime television series by Sunrise, based on the Namco Bandai Games series The Idolmaster. It aired between April 4 and September 24, 2007, on Kansai TV and various other UHF television stations. The series was also broadcast over the Internet on the Japanese website @nifty. The series has been licensed by Sentai Filmworks in North America. The word Xenoglossia in the title is a term taken from Greek for using a language (talking, reading or writing) that is completely unknown to the user.

== Plot ==
Idolmaster: Xenoglossia centers around mecha and re-imagines the ten prospective idols from The Idolmaster as fighter pilots of those robots, with eight of them also posing as students. The large robots are called Immortal Defender of Legatee (IDOL) and their pilots are called Idolmasters. IDOL pilots have to be girls, and they have to be chosen by the IDOL itself. The Moon was destroyed 107 years prior to the beginning of the story in an event called Lost Artemis. This event caused numerous fragments to fall onto the Earth, which killed about one quarter of the Earth's total population. The remaining fragments of the Moon which orbit around the Earth are called Kompeito or Confeito. Once a fragment falls onto Earth, it is called a Drop. If the Drop is big, resulting in a moderate threat to the Earth, then it will be called Mint Drop or Lemon Drop according to sizes. Humans found a special silicon on Earth, probably from fallen Drops, and started research to turn that silicon into IDOL cores, of which there are five. The IDOLs are named after Lunar maria.

Haruka Amami, initially unsure of herself, passes an audition to be a singing idol and she is sent to Tokyo to start a career in the entertainment. She does not know that the agency that recruited her is actually a front for a big task force called Mondenkind which uses the IDOLS to save the Earth from falling fragmented pieces of the Moon. Mondenkind's job is to handle any Drop that is bigger than Lemon–class. While the other countries of the world have missiles to handle Drops, Japan is currently the only country which uses IDOLs to destroy Drops. Yukiho Hagiwara and Iori Minase, who also want to be idols, are also taken into the same task force.

== Cast ==
From left to right: Yukiho Hagiwara, Haruka Amami, and Iori Minase

- Haruka Amami (天海 春香, Amami Haruka): Yuka Iguchi
- Yukiho Hagiwara (萩原 雪歩, Hagiwara Yukiho): Yui Horie
- Iori Minase (水瀬 伊織, Minase Iori): Yukari Tamura
- Yayoi Takatsuki (高槻 やよい, Takatsuki Yayoi): Ami Koshimizu
- Makoto Kikuchi (菊地 真, Kikuchi Makoto): Eri Kitamura
- Ritsuko Akizuki (秋月 律子, Akizuki Ritsuko): Mai Nakahara
- Azusa Miura (三浦 あずさ, Miura Azusa): Tomo Sakurai
- Chihaya Kisaragi (如月 千早, Kisaragi Chihaya): Kaori Shimizu
- Ami Futami (双海 亜美, Futami Ami): Kaori Nazuka
- Mami Futami (双海 真美, Futami Mami): Momoko Saitō
- R.I.F.F.A (リファ, Rifa): Yukana
- Naze Munakata (宗方 名瀬, Munakata Naze): Mamiko Noto
- Naraba Daidō (大道 楢馬, Daidō Naraba): Daisuke Ono
- Sorewa Suzuki (鈴木 空羽, Suzuki Sorewa): Mikako Takahashi
- Chikako Minamoto (源 千佳子, Minamoto Chikako): Naomi Shindō
- Hotaru Yasuhara (安原蛍, Yasuhara Hotaru): Ryōka Yuzuki
- Hibiki Saku (朔 響, Saku Hibiki): Takuma Takewaka
- Karasu (カラス): Akira Ishida
- Joseph Shingetsu (ジョセフ・真月, Josefu Shingetsu): Kazuhiro Nakata

== IDOL ==
IDOLs are robots used to destroy "Drop"s, remnants of the destruction of the Moon 107 years previous during an event called the "Lost Artemis". Humans found a special silicon on Earth, probably from fallen Drops, and started research to turn that silicon into IDOL cores. There are a total of five cores.

Normally, Drops are dealt with using missiles; however, since Japan does not have a missile system because they cannot build a nuclear warhead under the Three Non-Nuclear Principles, they were assigned and approved to use IDOLs in order to destroy Drops. IDOL pilots have to be girls, and they have to be chosen by the IDOL itself; those people are called Idolmasters.

The IDOLs are named after lunar features.

The Shuko, mentioned only in passing by a side character, was to become the main focus of the show, however a budget cut meant that a core element to the overarching story arc was left out.

=== Mondenkind ===
Prometheus–1 Imber

- Master: Chihaya Kisaragi, Haruka Amami
- Colors: white and indigo blue (episodes 1–7), white and pink (episode 8 on)
- Name origin: Mare Imbrium

Prometheus–2 Nebula

- Master: Azusa Miura (past) Makoto Kikuchi (episodes 1–13), Iori Minase (episode 14 on)
- Colors: yellow and orange
- Name origin: Palus Nebularum

Prometheus–4 Tempestas

- Master: Mami and Ami Futami
- Color: red
- Name origin: Oceanus Procellarum

=== Turiavita ===
Prometheus–3 Nubilum

- Master: Chihaya Kisaragi, Yukiho Hagiwara
- Colors: black and red
- Name origin: Mare Nubium

Prometheus–5 Hiems

- Master: Makoto Kikuchi
- Colors: white and yellow
- Name origin: Lacus Hiemalis

Epimetheus–1 "Epi-chan"

- Master: RIFFA
- Color: blue
- Name origin: Epimetheus

== Terminology ==
Idolmaster
The female IDOL pilots are called "Idolmasters". Since only Japan must use IDOLs to destroy drops, all of the current IDOL pilots are Japanese. In order to find a new Idolmaster, the Japanese branch of Mondenkind holds auditions, which are actually a secret process in order to keep the truth about IDOL to themselves before the participants are actually qualified.
Lost Artemis
The destruction of the moon 107 years prior to the story. This event caused numerous fragments to fall onto the face of the Earth, which killed about one quarter of the Earth's total population.
Kompeito/Confeito
The remaining fragments of the moon, left over from the destruction of the moon, orbiting around Earth.
Drop
A meteoroid created by the destruction of the moon that falls onto Earth. If the "drop" is big, resulting in a moderate threat to the Earth, then it will be call Mint Drop or Lemon Drop according to sizes. Mondenkind's job is to handle any Drop that is bigger than Lemon–class; while the other countries of the world have missiles to handle Drops, Japan is currently the only country who uses IDOLs to destroy Drops.

== Media ==
=== Anime ===
The 26-episode anime television series is produced by Sunrise and directed by Tatsuyuki Nagai. The scenario was written by Jukki Hanada, and Hiroshi Takeuchi based the character design used in the series on Toshiyuki Kubooka's original designs. The mechanical design was handled by Junichi Akutsu and Hiroyuki Ōkawa. The art director for the series was Toshiyuki Tokuda. The sound director was Yōta Tsuruoka, and the music in the series was composed by Tsuneyoshi Saito. The first opening theme is "Binetsu S.O.S!!" (微熱S.O.S!!) by Miyuki Hashimoto and the second opening theme is "Zankoku yo Kibō to Nare" (残酷よ希望となれ) by Aira Yūki. The ending theme is "Yūkyū no Tabibito ~ Dear boy" (悠久の旅人～Dear boy) by Snow*.

=== Other media ===
A manga adaptation was serialized in Kadokawa Shoten's Comp Ace between volumes 12 and 23 sold between February 26, 2007, and January 26, 2008. A single tankōbon volume was released on September 26, 2007. It is not a direct adaptation from the anime and features a different story line.

There are two light novels based on Idolmaster: Xenoglossia. The first, Idolmaster: Xenoglossia ~Bonds~ (アイドルマスター XENOGLOSSIA ～絆～, Aidorumasutā Xenoglossia ~Kizuna~), was published in Fujimi Shobo's Gekkan Dragon Magazine between the July and November 2007 issues. The second, Idolmaster: Xenoglossia Iori Sunshine! (アイドルマスター XENOGLOSSIA 伊織サンシャイン!, Aidorumasutā Xenoglossia Iori Sanshain), was published in Hobby Japan's Charano! between the August 2007 and February 2008 issues.

An Internet radio show to promote the series called Haruka and Yayoi in the Spring-style Radio (春香とやよいの弥生式らじお, Haruka to Yayoi no Yayoishiki Rajio) broadcast 51 episodes between March 9, 2007, and February 22, 2008. It was hosted by Yuka Iguchi and Ami Koshimizu and produced by Lantis Radio, Beat Net Radio! and Nifty.

On April 20 2026 The Idolmaster: Xenoglossia is set to appear in Super Robot Wars Y as part of DLC 3
