= Uchusen =

Japanese magazine

- First issue of Uchusen, 1980
- Categories: Science fiction and tokusatsu media
- Frequency: Quarterly (formerly bi-monthly)
- Founded: 1980
- Company: Hobby Japan
- Country: Japan
- Website: hobbyjapan.co.jp/uchusen/

Uchusen (Japanese: 宇宙船, Hepburn: Uchūsen, lit. 'Spaceship'), also known as Space Magazine Uchusen, is a Japanese magazine about science fiction and tokusatsu films, television series, and other media. First published in 1980 by the company Asahi Sonorama, the magazine's publication frequency alternated between quarterly and bi-monthly over time before it temporarily ceased publication in 2005.

In 2008, the magazine was revived as a quarterly publication by Hobby Japan.

== Publication history ==
The first issue of Uchusen was published in January 1980. Early issues of the magazine, published by Asahi Sonorama, feature articles about older science fiction media, information regarding new and upcoming media at the time of the issues' publication, and blueprints and diagrams of robots, spaceships and mecha. The magazine would become known for publishing articles and information related to special effects, as well as tokusatsu media franchises like Godzilla, Kamen Rider and Ultraman.

Uchusen was first published in a quarterly format, but its publication frequency alternated between quarterly and bi-monthly over the decades. The magazine ceased publication in 2005 after 119 issues.

After acquiring the magazine's trademark from Asahi Sonorama, Hobby Japan revived Uchusen in 2008 as a quarterly publication. The first issue of this new edition of Uchusen, published on April 1, 2008, continued the numbering of the magazine's original run by being numbered as Uchusen's 120th issue.
