= HJ Bunko =

Japanese publishing label

HJ Bunko (HJ文庫) is a publishing label affiliated with the Japanese publishing company Hobby Japan. It was established in July 2006 and is a light novel label that is aimed at a young adult male readership. Hobby Japan publishes a bimonthly light novel magazine titled Charano!.

== Light novels published under HJ Bunko ==
=== A ===
Title	Author	Illustrator	No. of volumes
Aesthetica of a Rogue Hero	Tetsuto Uesu	Tamago no Kimi	11
AIKa R-16: Turning Mission	Akira Suzuki	Noriyasu Yamauchi	1
Akuma de Shōjo	Hikaru Wakatsuki	Masato@Takashina	4
Akuma wo Munyumunyusuru Riyū	Hiroyuki Kagami	Kurogawa Izumi	2
Aku ni Ochitara Bishōjo Mamirede Daishōri!!	Rokujūshi Okazawa	Masato Mutsumi	6
Alexion Saga	Yū Godai	Mutsumi Inomata	2
An Archdemon's Dilemma: How to Love Your Elf Bride	Fuminori Teshima	COMTA	15
Annis to Fukigen na Mahō Tsukai	Makio Hanafusa	Ryō Ueda	3
Ano Hibi wo Mōichido	Takehaya	Sou	1
Anuvis!	Kusanagi Aki	Sazanami Mio	2
Aoi Hana no Densetsu	Yūki Yahara	Kaduki Kugawara	1
Armored Trooper Votoms: Command Vorct	Tōru Nozaki	Norio Shioyama	2
Ashitabiyori	Mamori Amamori	Suzunari Shimokitazawa	2

=== B ===
Title	Author	Illustrator	No. of volumes
Binzume Otomegokoro	Mamori Amamori	Yūji Naruse	1
Black Sheep	Hiroshi Tominaga	Sō Samba	1
Bluesteel Blasphemer	Ichirō Sakaki	Tera Akai	1
Breathless Hunter	Shin'ya Kasai	Eiji Kaneda	3
Bright Red Level	Takehiro Arihara	Kōji	2

=== C ===
Title	Author	Illustrator	No. of volumes
Chōkōjo Sarah	Tomonori Terada	Ein	6
The Combat Baker and Automaton Waitress	SOW	Zaza	9
Chōkōjo Sarah Gaiden: Chōkōseijo Becky	Tomonori Terada	Ein	1
Cutting	Daisuke Haneta	Mo	4

=== D ===
Title	Author	Illustrator	No. of volumes
Demon King Daimaou	Shōtarō Mizuki	Sōichi Itō	13
Deus Replica	Ayumu Ninomae	On	3
Disvairocana of the Acala Sword	Motaka Tsugawa	Riv	5

=== F ===
Title	Author	Illustrator	No. of volumes
Fake-Fake: Mozō Ohjo Sōdōki	Ichirō Sakaki	Kaori Fujita	3
FLAG: Wartime photo-journalist Saeko Shirasu	Mami Watanabe	Kazuyoshi Takeuchi	1
Flag no Ohjisama	Kyōdai Oda	Kikurage	2

=== G ===
Title	Author	Illustrator	No. of volumes
Gedō Ōji no Lemegeton	Aru Fujitani	Takumi Inoue	4
Gekka no Utahime to Magi no Ō	Daisuke Haneda	Kagerō Ōba	4
Glau Standear Kōkoku Monogatari			5
Glorious Dawn	Takeshi Shōji	Shiki Dōji	8 (Franchise); 1 (Eyecatch)
The Greatest Magicmaster's Retirement Plan	Izushiro	Ruria Miyuki	15
Genome Seed & Genome Spiral	Narumi Takahira	Yō Fujishiro	2
Goddess!	Reiko Hikawa	Ototsugu Konoe	3
Gohyoku na Boku to Grimoire	Baraddo Kitaguni	Haruken	1
Goldberg Variations	Yū Godai	Rika Suzuki	1

=== H ===
Title	Author	Illustrator	No. of volumes
Hakana-san ga kita!	Oda Kyōdai	Takehito Mizuki	3
Hajimari no Hone no Monogatari	Yū Godai	Rika Suzuki	1
Hell Girl: Urami no Monshō	Maki Hiro	Shunsuke Taue	1
Hibana Sparkling!	Seiya Fujiwara	Noriyuki Matsumoto	2
High-School Secret Service!	Kaho Mizumaru	Isll	1
Hōkago no Sekai Seifuku	Hikaru Wakatsuki	Hotori	1
Hyakka Ryōran Samurai Girls	Akira Suzuki	Niθ	17

=== I ===
Title	Author	Illustrator	No. of volumes
Idolmaster Xenoglossia: Iori Sunshine!+	Ryō Suzukaze	Sikorsky	1
Ikkitousen Will Drive	Takehiro Arihara	Takumi Inoue	1
Ikusahime	Midori Natsu	Iruka Shiomiya	3
Imōto Dragon Ani Wakahage	Shunsuke Taniguchi	Aki	1
Infinite Dendrogram	Sakon Kaidou	Taiki	18
Infinity Blade	Ayumu Ninomae	Sai Izumi	1
Invaders of the Rokujouma!?	Takehaya	Poco	40 + 2 side stories
I Saved Too Many Girls and Caused the Apocalypse	Namekojirushi	Nao Watanuki	16
Item Cheat na Dorei Harem Kenkokuki	Nuko Nekomata	Natsu Natsuna	1

=== J ===
Title	Author	Illustrator	No. of volumes
Jashin Kōryakusha no Sengi Kyōdō	Kazuki Sorano	Yuichi Murakami	4

=== K ===
Title	Author	Illustrator	No. of volumes
Kagetsuki no Yajiri	Yui Tokiumi	Asami	1
Kanojo wa Megane-HOLIC	Tetsuto Uesu	Shunsaku Tomose	3
Ken to Mahōu no Sekai desu ga, Ore no Kikai Heiki wa Kyō mo Muteki desu.	Tomotaka Tsugawa	Yuichi Murakami	2
Kigurumi no Shugosha	Okina Kamino	Koin	1
Kō 1 Desu ga Isekai de Jōshu Hajimemashita	Hiroyuki Kagami	Goban	2
Kōjin no Maō to Tsukikage no Shōjo Gunshi	Akito Sakurazaki	Tamago no Kimi	2
Kurokano	Midori Natsu	Tsukasa Saitō	1
Kushizashi Helper Sasare-san	Kō Kimura	Tetsuya Nakamura	3

=== L ===
Title	Author	Illustrator	No. of volumes
Laetitian Dragonlord Story	Ken Suebashi	Tsuyuki	2
Lottery Travelers	Fumika Shimizu	Yoshitaka Ushiki	9

=== M ===
Title	Author	Illustrator	No. of volumes
Magical Marine Pixel Maritan	L. B. Johnson	Yukio Hirai	1
Majo Sannin to Ore no xx na Kankei	Ayumu Ninomae	Hideyu Tohgarashi	1
Maō na Ore to Ghoul no Yubiwa	Yusura Kankitsu	Shugasuku	5
The Master of Ragnarok & Blesser of Einherjar	Takayama Seiichi	Yukisan	23
Meigen no Miko	Seiya Fujiwara	Haruyuki Morisawa	1
Meikai no Amaryllis	Ken'ichi Wada	Atsushi Suzumi	1
Mō Zutto, Isekai Shōkan Teishichu!?	Aru Fujitani	Taiyaki	1
Mob kara Hajimaru Tansaku Eiyūtan	Kaitō	Almic	7
My-HiME Destiny: Ryū no Miko	Hideaki Ibuki & Hajime Yatate, My-Hime Project	Sankichi Meguro	1
My Big Sister Lives in a Fantasy World	Tsuyoshi Fujitaka	An2A	7
Mystic Museum	Miyako Fujiharu	Shizuki Morii	1

=== N ===
Title	Author	Illustrator	No. of volumes
Nihon Jōkū Irasshaimase	Shio Sasahara	Taskohna	2

=== O ===
Title	Author	Illustrator	No. of volumes
Omakase Taima! Shield Girls	Akira Suzuki	Mika Aketaka	3
One Turn Kill of the Dark Partisan	Kōta Nozomi	Yūnagi	5
Ore no Real to Netgame ga Love Come ni Shinshokusare Hajimete Yabai	Aru Fujitani	Kurone Mishima	8
Ore to Kanojo no Battle wa Living de	Nagi Hizuki	Kurone Mishima	2
Ore to Kanojo no Zettai Ryōiki	Takayama Seiichi	Gochō	7

=== P ===
Title	Author	Illustrator	No. of volumes
Pan-Ho!	Rin Yūki	Hashigo Ueda	1
Pastel Magic	Akira Kamishiro	Quan Xing	1
Paying to Win in a VRMMO	Blitz Kiva	Kuwashima Rein	6
Princess wa Otoshigoro!	Ichirō Sakaki	Waka Miyama	3

=== Q ===
Title	Author	Illustrator	No. of volumes
Queen's Blade	Eiji Okita	Eiwa (Franchise) & Hirotaka Akaga (Gekitō!)	5 (Franchise); 1 (Gekitō!)

=== R ===
Title	Author	Illustrator	No. of volumes
Rasen no Kuni no 3 drills	Hiroshi Tominaga	Uni	1
Real Ō!	Takumi Wakasa	Monorino	2
Reborn to Master the Blade: From Hero-King to Extraordinary Squire	Hayaken	Nagu	4
Red Data Dragon Lord	Sakaki Sengetsu	Tetsu Kurosawa	2
Revenge Revenge	Haruhisa Kujira	Kotetsu Yamanaka	1
RIN ~Daughters of Mnemosyne 2008~	Hiroshi Ōnogi	Chūō Higashguchi	1

=== S ===
Title	Author	Illustrator	No. of volumes
Satō-ke no Sentaku	Daisuke Kaihana	Akihiko Imaizumi	2
Scramble Wizard	Ken Suebashi	Kabocha	3
Seikō no Matsuei	Yūki Yahara	Atsuto Shinozuka	1
Seirei Gensouki: Spirit Chronicles	Yūri Kitayama	Riv	26
Senkan Ningen Hayato	Jun'ichi Ōsako	Hippo	3
Sensuikan	Shōtarō Mizuki	Mako Aboshi	3 (Franchise); 1 (Matome)
Shinaino.	Haruhisa Kujira	Aburidashi Zakuro	1
Shinanai otoko ni koi shita Shōjo	Kazuki Sorano	Puyo	1
Shinma to Sekai to Yome Flag	Kazuki Sorano	Niro	6
Shinmai Shachō no Perfect Game	Tomotaka Tsugawa	Kuroemon	3
Shinwa Seniki no Graphics	Najima Tatsunori	Sumihei	1
Shinwa Taisen Gilgamesh Knight	Daisuke Haneda	Makoto Ishiwata, Santa Tsuji	2
Shiroki Haō no Servant	Shinya Kasai		3
Special Anastasia Service	Hitsuji Torii	Mattaku Mōsuke	4
Sword Dragon Sword	Natsu Midori	Himesuz	1
Swords & Wizards Haken no Kōtei to Nanaboshi no Himegishi	Yusura Kankitsu	Niθ	1

=== T ===
Title	Author	Illustrator	No. of volumes
Tama Nama	Shinobu Fuyuki	Sakana	6
Tasukete Akiyoshi-kun!	Yū Fuwa	Chōniku	3
Tentei Gakuin no Domain Taker	Miyako Fujiharu	Refeia	3
Tetsujin Thousand	Jun'ichi Ōsako	FBC	3
Tobira no Majutsushi no Advent Gate	Kazuki Sorano	Ponjiritsu	5
Toki no Akuma to Mitsu no Monogatari	Koromigoya	Kabocha	1
Tornado!	Hideaki Ibuki	Shiki Dōji	1
Toy Joy Pop	Labo Asai	Noan Shibakura	1
Tsuki no Musume	Masaki Watanabe	Hideki Yamada	2

=== U ===
Title	Author	Illustrator	No. of volumes
Uraniwa no Kamisama	Okina Kamino	Rōga Rūen	4

=== W ===
Title	Author	Illustrator	No. of volumes
Worlds Walkers' Chronicle	Daisuke Haneda	Iidū	5

=== Y ===
Title	Author	Illustrator	No. of volumes
Yōkoso Mumokuteki-shitsu e!	Takehiro Arihara	Kuropenguin	1
Yumemiru Danshi wa Genjitsushugisha	Okemaru	Saba Mizore	7
Yūnagi	Masaki Watanabe	Hideki Yamada	1

=== Z ===
Title	Author	Illustrator	No. of volumes
Zenryaku. Neko to Tenshi to Dōkyo Hajimemashita.	Nagi Hizuki	Kagayo Akeboshi	6
Zero Wizard Extra	Takumi Wakasa	Yū Tachibana	4
