= Seirei Gensouki: Spirit Chronicles =

Japanese light novel series and its adaptation(s)

- First light novel volume cover

精霊幻想記 (Seirei Gensōki)
- Genre: Isekai
- Novel series
- Written by: Yuri Kitayama
- Published by: Shōsetsuka ni Narō
- Original run: February 12, 2014 – October 30, 2020
Further information
Light novel
Written by	Yuri Kitayama
Illustrated by	Riv (vol. 1–26); Kyoko Yufu (vol. 27 onwards)
Published by	Hobby Japan
English publisher	NA: J-Novel Club
Imprint	HJ Bunko
Original run	October 1, 2015 – present
Volumes	28
Manga
Written by	Yuri Kitayama
Illustrated by	tenkla
Published by	Hobby Japan
Magazine	Comic Fire
Original run	October 2016 – February 2017
Manga
Written by	Yuri Kitayama
Illustrated by	Futago Minaduki
Published by	Hobby Japan
English publisher	NA: J-Novel Club
Imprint	HJ Comics
Magazine	Comic Fire
Original run	July 2017 – present
Volumes	12
Anime television series
Directed by	Osamu Yamasaki (Note: Credited as Chief Director (総監督, Sō Kantoku) for the second season.); Hiroshi Kubo (S2)
Produced by	Atsushi Aitani; Nobuhiko Kurosu; Souji Miyagi; Masahiko Nagano; Kei Nishi; Shinji Oomori; Yuiko Ootomo; Tomoko Shibuya; Risa Murakawa; Yuuichirou Wada; Takamasa Hattori
Written by	Osamu Yamasaki
Music by	Yasuyuki Yamazaki
Studio	TMS Entertainment (Note: Production assistance (制作協力) for all episodes provided by Wao World.)
Licensed by	Crunchyroll
Original network	TV Tokyo, BS Fuji, AT-X
Original run	July 6, 2021 – present
Episodes	24
- icon

Seirei Gensouki: Spirit Chronicles (Japanese: 精霊幻想記, Hepburn: Seirei Gensōki) is a Japanese light novel series written by Yuri Kitayama and illustrated by Riv (first 26 volumes) and Kyoko Yufu (since volume 27). It was serialized online between February 2014 and October 2020 on the user-generated novel publishing website Shōsetsuka ni Narō. It was later acquired by Hobby Japan, which has published the series under its HJ Bunko imprint since October 2015. A manga adaptation with art by tenkla was serialized online via Hobby Japan's Comic Fire website from October 2016 to February 2017, being discontinued because of the artist's poor health. A second manga adaptation with art by Futago Minaduki has been serialized online via the same website since July 2017. Both the light novel and the second manga have been licensed in North America by J-Novel Club. An anime television series adaptation by TMS Entertainment aired from July to September 2021. A second season aired from October to December 2024. A third season has been announced.

== Plot ==
Haruto Amakawa is a Japanese college student who died in a bus crash before he could reunite with his childhood friend, Miharu Ayase, whom he hadn't seen in five years. Next thing he knew his memories resurrected in the body of a boy, Rio, living in the slums of the Bertram Kingdom in the Stralh region of another world. Two people with entirely different backgrounds and values—Rio wants revenge on behalf of his mother, who was murdered in front of him. Complicating matters, Rio suddenly encounters a kidnapping involving the two princesses. After Rio is cleared of abduction, the royalist rewards him with acceptance to the kingdom's academy for studying magic and swordsmanship. However, Rio is shunned by most of the peers there due to being a peasant. His only companion there is Celia Claire, a young female teacher who invites him into her laboratory on a daily basis. Before graduating from the academy, due to a false accusation, Rio became a fugitive and was forced to flee the country. He promises Celia that he will return once he travels to the far east of his mother's homeland to find his roots and stabilize his mixed personality. Along with Haruto's memories, Rio awakens a "special power", and it seems that if he uses it well, he can live a better life.

== Media ==
=== Light novels ===
The Seirei Gensouki: Spirit Chronicles light novel series is written by Yuri Kitayama and illustrated by Riv (first 26 volumes) and Kyoko Yufu (since volume 27). It was serialized online between February 2014 and October 2020 on the user-generated novel publishing website Shōsetsuka ni Narō but was later acquired by Hobby Japan which has published twenty-seven volumes since October 2015 under its HJ Bunko imprint. The light novels are licensed in North America by J-Novel Club.

=== Manga ===
A manga adaptation by tenkla was serialized online via Hobby Japan's Comic Fire website from October 2016 to February 2017, being discontinued because of the artist's poor health. A second manga adaptation by Futago Minaduki has been serialized online via the same website since July 2017 and collected in twelve tankōbon volumes. The second manga adaptation is also licensed in North America by J-Novel Club. The second manga adaptation was added to the Crunchyroll Manga catalog in January 2026.

=== Anime ===
An anime television series adaptation was announced by Hobby Japan on November 27, 2020. The series is animated by TMS Entertainment (with production cooperation by WAO World) and directed by Osamu Yamasaki, with Yamasaki, Mitsutaka Hirota, Megumu Sasano and Yoshiko Nakamura writing the scripts, Kyoko Yufu designing the characters, and Yasuyuki Yamazaki composing the series' music. The series aired from July 6 to September 21, 2021, on TV Tokyo and other networks. The opening theme song is "New story", performed by Marika Kōno, while the ending theme song is "Elder flower", performed by Aguri Ōnishi. Crunchyroll streamed the series outside of Asia. On October 28, 2021, Crunchyroll announced an English dub, which premiered on December 27 of the same year.

A second season was announced on November 5, 2021, which aired from October 8 to December 24, 2024. (Note: TV Tokyo lists the second season's premiere on October 7, 2024, at 25:30, which is effectively October 8 at 1:30 a.m. JST.) The opening theme song is "Auftakt" (アウフタクト, Aufutakuto), performed by Aguri Ōnishi, while the ending theme song is "Harumachiuta" (春待歌), performed by Nanaka Suwa.

A third season was announced on September 30, 2026.

==== Season 1 (2021) ====
No. overall	No. in season	Title	Directed by (Note: Production staff is taken from the ending credits of each episode.)	Written by	Storyboarded by	Original release date
1	1	"Memories of the Previous World"; Transliteration: "Zense no Kioku" (Japanese: 前世の記憶)	Daisuke Hiraoka	Osamu Yamasaki	Osamu Yamasaki	July 6, 2021
In a fantasy world, a young orphan called Rio who wants to take revenge on the man who murdered his mother, awakens memories of his past life as a Japanese young man called Haruto Amakawa. After rescuing Princess Flora from some kidnappers, Rio is captured under suspicions of being their accomplice. He is later tortured by the knights in an attempt to get a false confession for them to avoid embarrassment for losing the princess, but he doesn't yield. Rio is beaten to near death, but is soon cleared of all charges and is granted an audience with the king.
2	2	"Royal Academy"; Transliteration: "Ōritsu Gakuin" (Japanese: 王立学院)	Shū Honma	Mitsutaka Hirota	Kazuhisa Takenouchi	July 13, 2021
As a reward for rescuing Flora, Rio is accepted into the Royal Academy, where he is shunned by most of his peers due to his peasant origins. The only person to encourage Rio is his instructor, Celia. Five years pass at the Academy and Rio is chosen to participate in a military exercise with the Royal Knights, much to the chagrin of his noble classmates.
3	3	"Kingdom of Lies"; Transliteration: "Itsuwari no Ōkoku" (Japanese: 偽りの王国)	Rion Kujō	Megumu Sasano	Tomoyuki Munehiro	July 20, 2021 (Note: This episode aired at 2:10 a.m. JST, 10 minutes after the original air time on TV Tokyo.)
During a military exercise with his classmates, Rio is falsely accused of attempting to kill the princess and is forced to flee from the kingdom.
4	4	"The Assassin Girl"; Transliteration: "Ansatsusha no Shōjo" (Japanese: 暗殺者の少女)	Rion Kujō	Yoshiko Nakamura	Yūichirō Aoki	July 27, 2021
Latifa, a young beastkin assassin, is tasked to hunt and kill Rio. Rio defeats Latifa and frees her from the magic spell that forced her to obey her masters. The two start traveling together.
5	5	"Forest of Spirits"; Transliteration: "Seirei no Mori" (Japanese: 精霊の森)	Takeshi Tomita	Osamu Yamasaki	Shiyo Hatsumida	August 3, 2021
Rio is attacked by the beastkin of the Forest of Spirits when they assume he kidnapped Latifa (merely because he is human). Rio tries to explain peacefully, but they don't listen and gang up on him, resulting in him being knocked out. He awakens injured after a dream of meeting a spirit and is welcomed by the village as an apology for their bigoted actions. They also reveal the true nature of Rio's powers.
6	6	"Festival Night"; Transliteration: "Matsuri no Yoru" (Japanese: 祭りの夜)	Yūsaku Saotome	Mitsutaka Hirota	Tomoyuki Munehiro	August 10, 2021
One year later, Rio is about to depart to the land of his ancestors. When he tells Latifa, she is heartbroken at the thought of separating from her adoptive brother and runs away in tears. Suddenly a swarm of Wyverns threaten the Forest and Rio uses his newfound abilities to defend his friends.
7	7	"Land of Promises"; Transliteration: "Yakusoku no Chi" (Japanese: 約束の地)	Shū Honma	Megumu Sasano	Yoshiyuki Kaneko	August 17, 2021
Two months after leaving the forest, Rio arrives at the country of Yagumo, where he meets his grandmother and starts living at her village. When two of his new friends are assaulted by a group of rogues, Rio reminisces about his mother's death and is overcome with rage, almost killing the attackers.
8	8	"Royal Lineage"; Transliteration: "Ōke no Keifu" (Japanese: 王家の系譜)	Sumito Sasaki	Yoshiko Nakamura	Takayuki Murakami	August 24, 2021 (Note: This episode aired at 2:05 a.m. JST, 5 minutes after the original air time on TV Tokyo.)
Rio is introduced to the royalty of Yagumo and learns the truth about his parents' origins. In the occasion, he reveals to his maternal grandparents the horrible truth about his mother's death and his deep hatred towards the man responsible for it. He has a duel with one of his mother's past guardians and wins, showcasing his strength and resolve to avenge his mother to his grandparents.
9	9	"Each of Their Decisions"; Transliteration: "Sorezore no Ketsui" (Japanese: それぞれの決意)	Takeshi Tomita	Osamu Yamasaki	Shiyo Hatsumida	August 31, 2021
Rio spends a few more months living in the village and departs from Yagumo to continue his journey. Back to the Forest of Spirits, he reunites with Latifa and her friends, and is surprised when a woman he never seen before appears beside him.
10	10	"A Spirit's Awakening"; Transliteration: "Seirei no Mezame" (Japanese: 精霊の目覚め)	Yūsaku Saotome	Mitsutaka Hirota	Katsuyuki Kodera	September 7, 2021
The mysterious woman appearing before Rio introduces herself as his guardian spirit, whom he names "Aishia". After finishing his preparations, Rio and Aishia travel back to the Beltrum Kingdom, where the royal family have lost their power after a crushing defeat in a war. Rio learns that his friend and teacher Celia Claire is about to be forcibly married with Charles Arbor, an old enemy of his.
11	11	"Silver Bride"; Transliteration: "Hakugin no Hanayome" (Japanese: 白銀の花嫁)	Shinichi Fukumoto	Megumu Sasano	Kazuhisa Takenouchi	September 14, 2021
Rio reunites with Celia, who reveals that she must marry Charles for political reasons. She thanks Rio for meeting her once more and sends him away, but Rio has doubts if he should stop the wedding or not.
12	12	"Fated Reunion"; Transliteration: "Unmei no Saikai" (Japanese: 運命の再会)	Osamu Yamasaki	Yoshiko Nakamura	Tomoyuki Munehiro	September 21, 2021
Rio stops the wedding with the approval of Celia and the help of Aishia, and later travels to the mountains where he sees space-time rifts, indicating the summoning of other Japanese entities. He then proceeds to rescue three kids kidnapped by bandits for slave-trading purposes, where one of them turns out to be his childhood friend, Ayase Miharu.

==== Season 2 (2024) ====
No. overall	No. in season	Title	Directed by	Written by	Storyboarded by	Original release date
13	1	"When I Met You in This World, You Were..."; Transliteration: "Konna Sekai de Deatta Kimi wa" (Japanese: こんな世界で出会えた君は)	Hiroshi Kubo	Osamu Yamasaki	Hiroshi Kubo	October 8, 2024
14	2	"Shopping in Another World"; Transliteration: "Isekai Shoppingu" (Japanese: 異世界ショッピング)	Hiroshi Kubo	Megumu Sasano	Dashiyo Hatsumi	October 15, 2024
15	3	"My Home, Under Attack"; Transliteration: "Nerawareta Wa ga Ie" (Japanese: 狙われた我が家)	Hiroshi Kubo	Matsutaka Hirota	Dashiyo Hatsumi	October 22, 2024
16	4	"Welcome Home"; Transliteration: "Okaerinasai" (Japanese: おかえりなさい)	Sōta Shiro	Yoshiko Nakamura	Dashiyo Hatsumi	October 29, 2024
17	5	"Heroes and Champions"; Transliteration: "Yūsha to Eiyū" (Japanese: 勇者と英雄)	Naoki Miki	Osamu Yamasaki	Hiroshi Kubo	November 5, 2024
18	6	"Lynchpin of Memories"; Transliteration: "Kioku no Kusabi" (Japanese: 記憶の楔)	Shigeki Awai	Megumu Sasano	Dashiyo Hatsumi	November 12, 2024
19	7	"Intruders"; Transliteration: "Ran'nyūsha-tachi" (Japanese: 乱入者たち)	Yūsaku Sootome	Mitsutaka Hirota	Dashiyo Hatsumi	November 19, 2024
20	8	"The Clutches of Evil, Stealing Ever Closer"; Transliteration: "Shinobiyoru Ma no Te" (Japanese: 忍び寄る魔の手)	Kо̄suke Kobayashi	Yoshiko Nakamura	Kazuhisa Takenouchi	November 26, 2024
21	9	"The Battle to Defend Amande"; Transliteration: "Amando Bōei-sen" (Japanese: アマンド防衛戦)	Yūsaku Sootome	Osamu Yamasaki	Dashiyo Hatsumi	December 3, 2024
22	10	"Destined Enemy"; Transliteration: "In'nen no Shukuteki" (Japanese: 因縁の宿敵)	Shigeki Awai	Megumu Sasano	Dashiyo Hatsumi	December 10, 2024
23	11	"Clash"; Transliteration: "Gekitotsu" (Japanese: 激突)	Osamu Yamasaki	Mitsutaka Hirota	Osamu Yamasaki	December 17, 2024 (Note: This episode aired at 1:40 a.m. JST, 10 minutes after its original air time on TV Tokyo.)
24	12	"Toward a Fateful Tomorrow"; Transliteration: "Unmei no Ashita e" (Japanese: 運命の明日へ)	Hiroshi Kubo	Yoshiko Nakamura	Dashiyo Hatsumi	December 24, 2024

=== Game ===
A free-to-play role-playing game, titled Seirei Gensouki Another Tale, was launched on the G123 game platform in July 2021.
