= Hobby Japan =

Game publisher

Hobby Japan Co., Ltd.
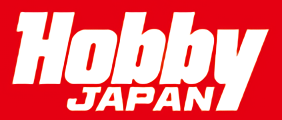
- Founded: September 27, 1969; 56 years ago
- Country of origin: Japan
- Headquarters location: Yoyogi, Shibuya-ku, Tokyo
- Key people: Daisuke Matsushita, president
- No. of employees: 150 (2023)
- Official website: hobbyjapan.co.jp/

Hobby Japan Co., Ltd. (株式会社ホビージャパン, Kabushiki gaisha Hobī Japan) is a Japanese publishing company known for publishing and releasing books, magazines, light novels, games, and collectibles. Founded in 1969, the company owns and distributes such publications as the eponymous Hobby Japan EX magazine, as well as Uchusen. The company has also released a number of role-playing and tabletop games, action figures related to anime and manga franchises, as well as diecast cars and related models.

== Product lines ==
=== Role-playing games ===
- Dungeons & Dragons 3rd, 3.5 and 4th edition (translated)
- Warhammer Fantasy Roleplay 2nd edition (translated)
- Ring Master I: The Shadow of Filias - Filias Nogisu no Anun (X68000, 1989)
- Ring Master II: Forget You Not, Evermore - Eien Naru Omoi (X68000, 1990)

=== Diecasts ===
- Honda Civic EG6 SiR-II
- Honda Civic (FK7)
- Honda Civic (FL5)
- Honda Civic Type-R (EK9, FD2R, FK8R, and FL5R)
- Honda StepWGN (2022)
- Honda Vezel e:HEV
- Honda Fit (GR)
- Honda Freed
- Honda S2000 (AP2)
- Honda NSX (NA1 & NA2 series)
- Honda N-Box (2024)
- Lexus IS200/Toyota Altezza (first generation)
- Lexus GS430/Toyota Aristo (second generation)
- Lexus LM300h
- Lexus LM500h
- Lexus LX600
- Mazda RX-7
- Mazda Eunos Roadster
- Mitsubishi GTO
- Mitsubishi Lancer Evolution (VI, VII, IX, and X)
- Subaru Levorg (first & second generations)
- Subaru BRZ
- Subaru Impreza WRX STI (GC & GD)
- Suzuki Alto Works
- Toyota Alphard (third & fourth generation)
- Toyota Vellfire (third & fourth generation)
- Toyota Probox
- Toyota Century
- Toyota Crown RS
- Toyota Land Cruiser 60
- Toyota Land Cruiser 250
- Toyota Land Cruiser 300
- Toyota GR86
- Toyota GR Corolla
- Toyota GR Yaris
- Toyota Sprinter Trueno
- Toyota Soarer

=== Game books ===
- Queen's Blade
- Fighting Fantasy (translated)

=== Anime ===
- Aesthetica of a Rogue Hero
- Demon King Daimao
- Hell Girl
- Hyakka Ryōran Samurai Girls
- Invaders of the Rokujyōma!?
- Infinite Dendrogram
- Queen's Blade
- Seirei Gensouki: Spirit Chronicles
- Seven Mortal Sins
- The Master of Ragnarok & Blesser of Einherjar

=== Light novels ===
- HJ Bunko
- HJ Novels

=== Other ===
- Bikini Warriors

== See also ==
- Charano!
- List of game manufacturers
