= Virgin Punk =

Japanese anime film series

- Key visual for the first part, Clockwork Girl, featuring Ubu Kamigori (left) and Mr. Elegance (right)
- ヴァージン・パンク; Vājin Panku
- Type: Film series
- Genre: Cyberpunk; Girls with guns
- Created by: Yasuomi Umetsu; Shaft
- Directed by: Yasuomi Umetsu
- Series composition: Yūya Takahashi
- Screenplay by: Yūya Takahashi
- Character designer: Yasuomi Umetsu
- Music by: Yoshiaki Dewa
- Country of origin: Japan
- Original language: Japanese

Production
- Art directors: Yuuki Funagakure; Yuuji Honjou
- Sound director: Shouji Hata
- Cinematographers: Takayuki Aizu; Rei Egami
- Color designer: Yasuko Watanabe
- CG directors: Masahiro Hiraoka; Hisato Shima; Wataru Miyazaki
- Editor: Rie Matsubara
- Animation producer: Ryuusuke Suzuki
- Studio: Shaft
- Producer: Akiko Yodo
- Production company: Aniplex; Shaft
- Distributed by: Aniplex
- Runtime: 35 minutes (Part 1)

Original release
- Release: June 27, 2025 (Part 1)

Virgin Punk (Japanese: ヴァージン・パンク, Hepburn: Vājin Panku) is an original anime film series created by director Yasuomi Umetsu and animation production studio Shaft. It is directed by and features character designs by Umetsu, with Yuji Honjo and Yuki Funagakure serving as art directors, Yūya Takahashi writing film scripts, and Yoshiaki Dewa composing the music. The first part, Clockwork Girl, was given a limited theatrical release starting June 27, 2025.

== Plot ==
=== Setting ===
In the year 2099, medical technology is revolutionized with the invention of Somadea technology, which allows humans to replace lost limbs with advanced prosthetics, or even to transfer their brains into fully android bodies. However, Somadea technology is quickly abused, with criminals illegally modifying themselves with weaponized implants. Powerless to stop rogue Somadea criminals, the police organize a bounty system so specialized bounty hunters can eliminate illegal Somadea criminals in return for monetary compensation, with the only condition being the bounty hunter bring the bounty's head dead or alive.

=== Clockwork Girl ===
Fourteen year old girl Ubu Kamigori lives an idyllic life in an orphanage, dreaming one day to become a Somadea engineer. However, her life is disrupted when the bounty hunters Elegance and Maggie storm the orphanage, killing the director who was actually a criminal wielding an illegal Somadea implant. Elegance, who exhibits a strong lolita complex, takes an interest in Ubu and offers to adopt her, with Ubu flatly refusing. Ten years later, Ubu has become a bounty hunter, hunting down Somadea criminals for cash. During one such hunt, she competes with Maggie for the bounty, with Maggie getting killed due to her recklessness while Elegance watches on. After cashing in her bounty, Ubu returns home to find Elegance waiting for her, and he shoots her without warning.

One year later, Ubu awakens in a hospital and is shocked to discover that she has been transferred into a Somadea body that resembles her fourteen year old self. Elegance reveals he was behind converting her into a Somadea, and that he can remotely shut down her body with a kill switch. Unable to defy Elegance, Ubu reluctantly agrees to become his ward. Soon after, Somadea serial killer Tommy J goes on a rampage throughout the city. Another bounty hunter, Lewis, tries to confront him but is outmatched due to being a regular human. Ubu then arrives on the scene and easily defeats Tommy J with her new body. Afterwards, Elegance celebrates being able to have Ubu work for him, while Ubu buys a new revolver and promises to get her revenge on Elegance.

== Characters ==
=== Clockwork Girl ===
Ubu Kamigori (神氷羽舞, Kamigori Ubu)
Voiced by: Saki Miyashita (Japanese); Xanthe Huynh (English)
Mr. Elegance (Mr.エレガンス, Mr. Eregansu)
Voiced by: Katsuyuki Konishi (Japanese); David Cooley (English)
Lewis Gaudi (ルイス・ガウディ, Ruisu Gaudi)
Voiced by: Taku Yashiro (Japanese); Daman Mills (English)
Maggie (マギー, Magī)
Voiced by: Rui Tanabe (Japanese); Suzie Yeung (English)
Tommy J (トミー・J, Tomī J)
Voiced by: Norio Wakamoto (Japanese); Brent Mukai (English)
Noa Andriette (乃愛・アンドリエット, Noa Andorietto)
Voiced by: Fūka Izumi (Japanese); Erica Mendez (English)
Vespa (ヴェスパ, Vuesupa)
Voiced by: Sumire Uesaka (Japanese); Risa Mei (English)

== List of films ==
Episode	Written by	Unit director	Storyboard artist	Animation director	Release date	Running time
Clockwork Girl	Yūya Takahashi	Yasuomi Umetsu		Yasuomi Umetsu, Kazuchika Kise	June 27, 2025	35 minutes

== Creation ==
=== Pre-production ===
Co-creator and director Yasuomi Umetsu directed the opening for And Yet the Town Moves produced by Shaft and headed by his friend and colleague since the 1990s Akiyuki Shinbo in 2010. Umetsu liked the studio's work, especially their digital animation teams, and decided he wanted to work with the company one day. However, after Galilei Donna (2013) and Wizard Barristers (2014), he was unsure of what kind of direction to take. He presented three ideas to Shaft president Mitsutoshi Kubota for an original series who was also interested in making a work with Umetsu. Kubota gave Umetsu his approval for the Virgin Punk concept in 2015, which at the time was originally titled Vespa, and said he chose that specific project because it seemed the most like Umetsu. After receiving the plan, he took it to Aniplex CEO Atsuhiro Iwakami where the project was greenlit. Umetsu was then given responsibility of directing another opening for the company, Shinbo's Gourmet Girl Graffiti. The production assistant in charge of the opening was Ryuusuke Suzuki, and Umetsu liked his work, so he asked Suzuki to be the animation producer for the then-unannounced project. That year, writer Yūya Takahashi joined following the cancellation of a separate work, and the screenplay was finished in 2016. The series' title, Virgin Punk, and the first film's subtitle, Clockwork Girl, were both chosen in a discussion regarding what to officially call them. Screenwriter Takahashi came up with both, and it is the first title in Umetsu's directorial catalogue in which he did not come up with the title. The setting is based on the city of Lisbon in Portugal. In 2016, some of the staff members, like art directors Honjou and Funagakure, visited Portugal for research and location shooting; and Umetsu intended to go as well, but was unable to due to a conflicting schedule with the production of the opening for Touken Ranbu: Hanamaru.

At the time, Shaft was still largely headed by Shinbo's ideas and style, who was essentially the company's chief director of sorts, and Kubota insisted that Umetsu didn't have to be bound by the studio's other works or its usual "directing manual." Both Kubota and Iwakami encouraged to direct Virgin Punk however he saw fit. Between 2016 and 2018, Umetsu appeared several times and various other studios mainly contributing animation or directing openings and endings. It wasn't until 2018 that the animation production process itself started.

=== Production ===
==== Clockwork Girl ====
Umetsu brought on several collaborators from his previous works mainly from Arms, Pierrot+ (Arms' sister company), A-1 Pictures, and Production I.G (where he directed an opening in 2011): Shinichi Yokota worked with Umetsu on Wizard Barristers, and Umetsu called him to the project because he believed that Yokota had a talent for design work; he sub-character designer Keita Matsumoto while at Production I.G; prop designer Naoko Kouda worked with Umetsu on Galilei Donna at A-1 Pictures; main animator Shinya Takahashi was a veteran collaborator of Umetsu's since the early 2000s; and main animator Maho Kandou met Umetsu when she still worked for Pierrot+. Suzuki called art directors Yuuki Funagakure and Yuuji Honjou onto the project. Genichirou Abe was the only one of the three main animators on the project affiliated with Shaft and whom Umetsu humored to be "Shaft's treasure" (シャフトの至宝). Shaft also provided color designer Yasuko Watanabe and directors of photography Rei Egami and Takayuki Aizu.

Umetsu made few appearances on any anime for several years once the production process started and mainly showed up for key animation work on some of Shaft's other titles. In 2021, he directed the opening to Shinbo and Hajime Ootani's Pretty Boy Detective Club as the first indication of his project at the company. Kubota gave the "Umetsu team" who worked on the opening (many of whom were involved with Virgin Punk) the name of "Shaft Umegumi" in the credits as a reference to Umetsu's project. He also made appearances on the studio's Magia Record production in 2020 and 2022, and also on episodes of other series Shaft was involved with directed by Kouji Matsumura (another friend of his from Pierrot+ who joined Shaft and was promoted to episode director at the company).

Although both pre-production and production took a considerable amount of time, Umetsu was focused on quality and Kubota was focused on allowing Umetsu to display the full span of his sensibilities and style. For Kubota, this meant being able to satiate people on a cut-by-cut basis. In a first for Umetsu's career, Shaft and Aniplex set no particular deadline and ensured that Umetsu had as much time as was necessary. Animator Daniela Padilla Barquero, a former employee of Shaft who continued to work with the company as a freelancer, noted Virgin Punk's high-level of detail orientation and considered it to be one of her most challenging projects. Although she considered her contributions to be relatively minimal, she said a month of work was needed to complete one second of the animation. Even up until the end of the production process, some cuts were given complete retakes by request of Umetsu. He was also, at first, only focusing on the direction of the project, but later ended up working as its sole animation director as well. Suzuki was particular about the effects animation and pushed the limits of the film to get a more-or-less 24 frames-per-second for all of the effects animation. In total, the first film had around 740-765 cuts in 31-32 minutes (not including the length of the ED credits) and a total of 35,000 drawings.

Umetsu continued to add elements to the work that were not originally in the screenplay and expanded upon them through the storyboards. This put a burden on the animators, and combined with the number of cuts, which in a standard 30-minute production would have had somewhere around 400 cuts (rather than 740), put a strain on the production side. For the sequel part, Umetsu said that he is looking to keep the content the same but decrease the number of cuts.

The project was officially announced in September 2024 at Aniplex Online Fest, with the first part released in a limited theatrical setting on June 27, 2025.

The film made its Australian debut as part of the Ani-May line-up at Fomo Cinemas Brunswick through Sugoi Co, being screen on May 22, 2026.

== Reception ==
In a review for The Japan Times, Matt Schley described the series' first part, Clockwork Girl, as being "exactly what you'd expect" considering Umetsu's past works. Schley criticized the plot for being unoriginal and the script for its "hackneyed dialogue" but nonetheless praised the film for its animation and overall "'90s throwback feel".

== See also ==
- Kite, 1998 anime OVA by the same director
- Mezzo Forte, 2000 anime OVA by the same director

== Notes ==
=== Works cited ===
- Maeda, Hisashi; Nakagami, Yoshikatsu; Kawabata, Takeshi; Nishitani, Nanako (2022). マギアレコード 魔法少女まどか☆マギカ外伝 TVアニメ公式ガイドブック 2巻 [Magia Record Puella Magi Madoka Magica TV Anime Official Guidebook Volume 2] (in Japanese). Houbunsha. ISBN 978-4832274006.
- Newtype (February 10, 2025). Newtype March 2025 (in Japanese). Kadokawa Shoten.
