= Genichirou Abe =

Japanese animator & director

Genichirou Abe 阿部 厳一朗
- Occupation: Animator
- Years active: 2003–present
- Employer: Shaft (2003–)

Genichirou Abe (Japanese: 阿部 厳一朗, Hepburn: Abe Genichirō), sometimes written as Genichirou Abe (阿部 厳一郎), is a Japanese animator and character designer.

== Career ==
Genichirou Abe joined Shaft in 2003 as an in-between animator. Within a year of joining the company, he was promoted to key animator on Tsukuyomi: Moon Phase, the company's first work with its soon-to-be longstanding chief director Akiyuki Shinbo. Since his promotion, Abe has since been an integral part of many of Shaft's productions and an influential animator in the industry and within the company. Director Shin Oonuma mentioned that scenes like the two-minute 'oner' in the 14th episode of Negima!? (2006) are made under the premise that reliable key animators like Abe exist at the studio and can be given the time to work on said cuts. Following his acknowledgement by the directors at the studio, Abe has prominently appeared on a majority of the studio's works in some way or another. Director Naoyuki Tatsuwa apologized to Abe offhandedly during production of Maria Holic (2009) saying that he gave the Abe too much trouble, but continued to entrust him with various work. In the first segment of Katteni Kaizō (2011), Tatsuwa wrote the bare minimum of instructions in his storyboards since he intended to give Abe the scene and wanted him to freely add the details himself.

Puella Magi Madoka Magica chief animation director Junichirou Taniguchi, himself from studio Doga Kobo, was impressed with Abe's work during production of Puella Magi Madoka Magica (2011) episode 10. Abe was later part of the loosely-defined small, elite team of animators that animation producer Yasuhiro Okada entrusted for Puella Magi Madoka Magica: Rebellion (2013) in which Abe key animated a nearly 2-minute long action segment. In 2014, Abe designed the characters for the studio's adaptation of Mekakucity Actors, which to date is his first and only instance participating as a character designer. For a period of time starting that same year, Abe's output in Shaft's productions significantly decreased as he focused on the Kizumonogatari (2016) trilogy, which he later received "main animator" credit for. Aside from the various scenes he was individually responsible for on the films, he was also asked to create the rain patterns that appeared throughout the fight between Koyomi Araragi and Dramaturgy in the second installment (a scene primarily animated by Hiroyuki Ookaji). Following the end of Kizumonogatari, Abe returned to appearing on most of the studio's works up until 2022.

In 2024, he was announced as one of the main animators for Yasuomi Umetsu's film series Virgin Punk (alongside Shinya Takahashi and Maho Kandou) that was nearly 10 years in the making. From the projects inception, Umetsu intended to work both closely and extensively with Abe in order to maximize his talent on cuts of animation that aligned with his style. Accordingly, while Kandou worked on the greatest number of cuts by sheer volume on total on the project, Abe contributed the most key animation of all of the participating animators, and was solely responsible for key animating the film's 5-minute intro sequence. Through his extensive work on the project, Umetsu humored that Abe was "Shaft's treasure" (シャフトの至宝).

Abe is described as skilled at both effects and character animation, with some analysis on his work also associating him with "complex camerawork."

== Works ==
=== Television series ===
Year	Title	Director(s)	Studio	KA (Note: Key animator.)	Other roles and notes	Ref(s)
2003	Dear Boys	Susumu Kudou	A.C.G.T	No	In-between animator	
2003	Kino's Journey	Ryūtarō Nakamura	A.C.G.T	No	In-between animator	
2003	Popotan	Shinichiro Kimura	Shaft	No	In-between animator	
2003	Gilgamesh	Masaihko Murata	Group TAC; Japan Vistec	No	In-between animator	
2003	Maburaho	Shinichiro Kimura	J.C.Staff	No	In-between animator	
2004	Misaki Chronicles	Hiroshi Negishi; Jun Takeda	Radix	No	In-between animator	
2004	Massugu ni Ikou.	Kiyotaka Isako	Yumeta Company	No	In-between animator	
2004	This Ugly yet Beautiful World	Shouji Saeki	Gainax; Shaft	No	In-between animator	
2004	Tetsujin 28-gou	Yasuhiro Imagawa	Palm Studio	No	In-between animator	
2004	Gakuen Alice	Takahiro Omori	Group TAC	No	In-between animator	
2004	Uta Kata	Keiji Gotoh	Hal Film Maker	No	In-between animator	
2004	Tsukuyomi: Moon Phase	Akiyuki Shinbo	Shaft	Yes	In-between animator 2nd key animator	
2005	Pani Poni Dash!	Akiyuki Shinbo; Shin Oonuma	Shaft	Yes	Chibi character key animator	
2005	He is My Master	Shouji Saeki	Gainax; Shaft	Yes		
2006	Negima!?	Akiyuki Shinbo; Shin Oonuma	Shaft	Yes	2nd key animator	
2007	Hidamari Sketch	Akiyuki Shinbo; Ryouki Kamitsubo	Shaft	Yes		
2007	Sayonara, Zetsubou-Sensei	Akiyuki Shinbo	Shaft	Yes	Extra animation	
2007	Gurren Lagann	Hiroyuki Imaishi	Gainax	Yes		
2007	Ef: A Tale of Memories	Shin Oonuma	Shaft	Yes		
2008	Zoku Sayonara, Zetsubou-Sensei	Akiyuki Shinbo; Yukihiro Miyamoto	Shaft	Yes	2nd key animator	
2008	Hidamari Sketch x 365	Akiyuki Shinbo	Shaft	Yes		
2008	Ef: A Tale of Melodies	Shin Oonuma	Shaft	Yes		
2009	Zan Sayonara, Zetsubou-Sensei	Akiyuki Shinbo; Yukihiro Miyamoto	Shaft	Yes	In-between animator	
2009	Maria Holic	Akiyuki Shinbo; Yukihiro Miyamoto	Shaft	Yes		
2009	Natsu no Arashi!	Akiyuki Shinbo; Shin Oonuma	Shaft	Yes		
2009	Bakemonogatari	Akiyuki Shinbo; Tatsuya Oishi	Shaft	Yes	Assistant animation director	
2009	Natsu no Arashi! Akinai-chuu	Akiyuki Shinbo; Shin Oonuma; Kenichi Ishikura	Shaft	Yes		
2010	Naruto Shippuden	Hayato Date	Pierrot	Yes		
2010	Dance in the Vampire Bund	Akiyuki Shinbo; Masahiro Sonoda	Shaft	Yes		
2010	Hidamari Sketch x Hoshimittsu	Akiyuki Shinbo; Kenichi Ishikura	Shaft	Yes		
2010	Arakawa Under the Bridge	Akiyuki Shinbo; Yukihiro Miyamoto	Shaft	Yes		
2010	And Yet the Town Moves	Akiyuki Shinbo	Shaft	Yes		
2011	Puella Magi Madoka Magica	Akiyuki Shinbo; Yukihiro Miyamoto	Shaft	Yes		
2011	Ground Control to Psychoelectric Girl	Akiyuki Shinbo; Yukihiro Miyamoto	Shaft	Yes	2nd key animator	
2012	Nisemonogatari	Akiyuki Shinbo; Tomoyuki Itamura	Shaft	Yes		
2012	Haiyore! Nyaruko-san	Tsuyoshi Nagasawa	Xebec	Yes		
2012	Hidamari Sketch x Honeycomb	Akiyuki Shinbo; Yuki Yase	Shaft	Yes		
2012	Nekomonogatari: Black	Akiyuki Shinbo; Tomoyuki Itamura	Shaft	Yes	2nd key animator	
2013	Sasami-san@Ganbaranai	Akiyuki Shinbo; Naoyuki Tatsuwa	Shaft	Yes	Key animation assistance 2nd key animator	
2013	Monogatari Series Second Season	Akiyuki Shinbo; Tomoyuki Itamura; Naoyuki Tatsuwa; Yuki Yase	Shaft	Yes		
2014	Mekakucity Actors	Akiyuki Shinbo; Yuki Yase	Shaft	Yes	Character designer Animation director Assistant animation director 2nd key animator	
2014	Wizard Barristers	Yasuomi Umetsu	Arms	Yes		
2016	March Comes In like a Lion	Akiyuki Shinbo; Kenjirou Okada	Shaft	Yes		
2017	March Comes In like a Lion 2nd Season	Akiyuki Shinbo; Kenjirou Okada	Shaft	Yes		
2018	Fate/Extra: Last Encore	Akiyuki Shinbo; Yukihiro Miyamoto	Shaft	Yes		
2019	Zoku Owarimonogatari	Akiyuki Shinbo	Shaft	Yes		
2020	Magia Record	Doroinu; Yukihiro Miyamoto; Kenjirou Okada; Midori Yoshizawa	Shaft	Yes		
2020	Assault Lily Bouquet	Shouji Saeki; Hajime Ootani	Shaft	Yes		
2021	Magia Record: The Eve of Awakening	Doroinu; Yukihiro Miyamoto	Shaft	Yes		
2021	Pretty Boy Detective Club	Akiyuki Shinbo; Hajime Ootani	Shaft	Yes		
2022	Magia Record: Dawn of a Shallow Dream	Doroinu; Yukihiro Miyamoto	Shaft	Yes		
2022	RWBY: Ice Queendom	Toshimasa Suzuki; Kenjirou Okada	Shaft	Yes		
2022	Luminous Witches	Shouji Saeki	Shaft	Yes		
2023	Onimai	Shingo Fujii	Studio Bind	Yes		
2025	A Ninja and an Assassin Under One Roof	Yukihiro Miyamoto	Shaft	Yes		

=== OVAs/ONAs ===
Year	Title	Director(s)	Studio	KA	Other roles and notes	Ref(s)
2003	Temptation	Juuhachi Minamizawa	Arcturus	No	In-between animator	
2004	Angelique	Asumi Masekiryou	Yumeta Company	No	In-between animator	
2004	Sakura Wars: The New Paris	Yuusuke Yamamoto	Radix	No	In-between animator	
2006	Negima! Spring Special	Akiyuki Shinbo; Shin Oonuma	Shaft	Yes		
2006	Negima! Summer Special	Akiyuki Shinbo; Shin Oonuma	Shaft	Yes		
2008	Goku Sayonara, Zetsubou-Sensei	Akiyuki Shinbo; Yukihiro Miyamoto	Shaft	No	2nd key animator	
2009	Zan Sayonara, Zetsubou-Sensei	Akiyuki Shinbo; Yukihiro Miyamoto	Shaft	No	2nd key animator	
2011	Katteni Kaizō	Akiyuki Shinbo; Naoyuki Tatsuwa	Shaft	Yes	Animation director 2nd key animator	
2013	Hidamari Sketch: Sae & Hiro's Graduation Arc	Akiyuki Shinbo; Yuki Yase	Shaft	Yes		

=== Films ===
Year	Title	Director(s)	Studio	KA	Other roles and notes	Ref(s)
2007	Kino's Journey: Country of Illness	Ryūtarō Nakamura	Shaft	Yes		
2012	Puella Magi Madoka Magica: Beginnings	Akiyuki Shinbo; Yukihiro Miyamoto	Shaft	Yes		
2012	Puella Magi Madoka Magica: Eternal	Akiyuki Shinbo; Yukihiro Miyamoto	Shaft	Yes		
2013	Puella Magi Madoka Magica: Rebellion	Akiyuki Shinbo; Yukihiro Miyamoto	Shaft	Yes		
2016	Kizumonogatari I: Tekketsu	Akiyuki Shinbo; Tatsuya Oishi	Shaft	Yes	Main animator	
2016	Kizumonogatari II: Nekketsu	Akiyuki Shinbo; Tatsuya Oishi	Shaft	Yes		
2017	Kizumonogatari III: Reiketsu	Akiyuki Shinbo; Tatsuya Oishi	Shaft	Yes		
2017	Fireworks	Akiyuki Shinbo; Nobuyuki Takeuchi	Shaft	Yes		
2019	Space Battleship Yamato 2202	Nobuyoshi Habara	Xebec	Yes		
2025	Virgin Punk: Clockwork Girl	Yasuomi Umetsu	Shaft	Yes	Main animator 2nd key animator	
2026	Puella Magi Madoka Magica: Walpurgisnacht - Rising	Akiyuki Shinbo; Yukihiro Miyamoto	Shaft	Yes	Main action animator	

== Notes ==
=== Works cited ===
- Maeda, Hisashi; Hiraiwa, Shinsuke (2007). アニメ新表現宣言！新房監督作品の奥にアニメ表現の最先端を見た！ [Declaration of a New Expression for Anime! I saw the Cutting Edge of Anime Expression in Director Shinbo's Work!] (in Japanese). Tamon Creative.
- Misaka, Taiji, ed. (2009). まりあ†ほりっく アニメ公式ガイドブック [Maria Holic Anime Official Guidebook]. Media Factory. ISBN 978-4840129312.
- Magica Quartet (2011). 魔法少女まどか☆マギカ公式ガイドブック you are not alone. [Puella Magi Madoka Magica Official Guidebook you are not alone.]. Houbunsha. ISBN 978-4832240612.
- Kizawa, Yukito; Takayama, Atsushi; Saitou, Fusano, eds. (2014). 劇場版魔法やまどかマギカ[新編]叛逆の物語公式ガイドブック only you. [Movie Version Puella Magi Madoka Magica [New Edition] Story of Rebellion Official Guidebook only you.]. Houbunsha. ISBN 978-4832244290.
- Oota, Keiji; Shaft (August 18, 2017). パンフレット 打ち上げ花火、下から見るか?横から見るか? [Pamphlet: Fireworks, Should We See It from the Side or the Bottom?] (in Japanese). Toho.
- Takahashi, Yumi, ed. (November 23, 2019). Akiyuki Shimbo x Shaft Chronicle (in Japanese). Dotcom. ISBN 978-4835457017.
- Newtype (February 10, 2025). Newtype March 2025 (in Japanese). Kadokawa Shoten.
