= Cool Devices =

Japanese hentai anime series

- Cool Devices DVD cover
- Genre: Erotic
- Created by: Mon-Mon (01, 11); Hiroyuki Utatane (02); Protonsaurus (03); Yumisuke Kotoyoshi (04); PIL (05–06); Touboku Akutagawa (07); Konodonto (08–09); Persian Soft (10)
- Original video animation
- Directed by: Osamu Shimokawa (01); Hiroyuki Utatane (02); Hiroshi Matsuda (03, 07); Akira Nishimori (04); Kan Matsuda (05–06); Yukihiro Makino (08–09); Hiro Asano (10); Kouji Yoshikawa (11)
- Produced by: Masashi Oda (01–03); Hiroshi Fukuda (02–03, 05, 07); Kikuo Saitou (04, 08–09, 11); Hisaki Terasawa (04, 08–11); Kouichi Murakami (08–10)
- Written by: Mon-Mon (01, 11); Masamichi Kaneko (01–02, 04); Hiroyuki Utatane (02); Sayuri Takaishi (03, 10–11); Katsuma Kanazawa (03); Yumisuke Kotoyoshi (04); Nana Okatsu (04); Hironari Tadokoro (05–06); Kan Matsuda (05–06); Touboku Akutagawa (07); Morifumi Aoi (08–09)
- Music by: Flowers Land (01–04); Muse (05–06); TK Krow (07); Shinobu (08–11)
- Studio: Honey Dipp (01–03, 05–07); Bee Media (04); Life Work (04); JCF (08–09, 11); Studio Kuma (10); Art Office Sharaku (10)
- Licensed by: NA: Critical Mass Video
- Released: April 25, 1995 – November 28, 1997
- Episodes: 11

Cool Devices (Note: Full title: Kūru Dibaishisu (クールディバイシス; Cool Devices)) is a series of animated hentai pornographic videos. Released as OVA, the series consists of eleven mainly unrelated episodes referred to as operations and is most noted for its very extreme sexual content, most of which center on BDSM and similar fetish themes as well as its high production values (compared to other hentai titles of the time).

== Episodes ==
=== Operation 01: Curious Fruit ===
An innocent and virginal girl named Ai is lured by her curiosity into the underground world of sado-masochists by an exhibitionist couple who visits the club where she and her girlfriends are visiting. Spellbound, Ai follows the two, and is drawn into a world of bondage and rough sex. Finding herself transformed and liberated by the experience, Ai embraces the lifestyle, and enters into a passionate relationship with an equally uninhibited young man she is drawn to.

=== Operation 02: Sacred Girl ===
A reclusive young man and his younger sister live in a mansion together, where the young man frequently hosts sex parties every night, which he watches in his room via a network of surveillance cameras. It is later revealed that he wants to have sex with his sister, which he eventually does in a consensual scene near the end of the episode.

=== Operation 03: Lover Doll/Winter Swimsuit/Enema ===
==== Lover Doll ====
An anthropomorphic female rabbit is held in a cell as a sexual slave. Soon, a catgirl enters her room and has sex with the rabbit through the cell. Later, a man comes in and punishes the Catgirl for wandering off, then proceeds to rape her.

==== Winter Swimsuit ====
With a subtle BDSM premise, a teenage couple has sex in what seems to be a closed public bath house at night in the middle of winter. A reluctant girl is fondled, has her bathing suit cut off to expose her erogenous zones, and is coerced into performing various sex acts by her unnamed male partner.

==== Enema ====
An unnamed girl is coaxed into having sex in the women's bathroom. The ensuing sex acts culminate in anal sex which cures her constipation.

=== Operation 04: Kirei ===
The episode begins when a young blue-haired woman is shown having sex with a group of strange men, afterwards they throw her into an oubliette where she then emerges as a butterfly. In what seems to be an island paradise, two well-endowed girls called Rui and Kirei are on vacation. As time progresses, they notice that there is something unusual with the natives and the beautiful butterflies that inhabit the island. As they begin to notice these oddities, they begin to have sex with each other and the natives. The episode ends with the girls being gang raped, then thrown down the same oubliette from the beginning of the episode, and emerging as butterflies.

=== Operation 05: Seek I (Slave Girl Marino) ===
Based on a visual novel, the story begins when an ordinary girl named Marino Okura (a virgin) is being chased by two young men who are revealed to be human traffickers. After getting captured, she is then shown in their car nervous and scared. When she attempts to escape, she is pulled back and brought into the estate of the dominatrix Saki and her unnamed master. Saki and her master spend the episode training Marino to be their sex slave, a process which involves Marino being forced to perform various sex acts and submit to the demands of her masters. As the episode progresses, it becomes apparent that Saki's current master is actually the son of her original master, now deceased. Saki's original master made a living as a world-famous bondage artist. This, however, was only his public face. His true face was that of a masochist female dominator. The episode culminates with Marino being left chained in a cell to await her next "session".

=== Operation 06: Seek II (SM Queen Saki) ===
This episode is a continuation of Operation 05, and takes place during a sex party commemorating the anniversary of Saki's master's death. Saki presents the guests with a gift: Marino and two other girls (Momomi and Haruka), as their sex toys for the evening. Despite the introduction of new characters, this episode focuses mostly on Saki and her relationship with her previous master. Scenes of Saki reminiscing about her S&M training as a child are interspersed with displays of Marino and the other girls being subjected to humiliation and torture at Saki's hands. As Saki masturbates to thoughts of her deceased master, the three slaves enter the room, armed with bondage equipment, and take Saki back to the main party hall. Here, her current master presents Saki to the party guests for their enjoyment. Saki is subjected to much the same treatment to which she earlier exposed the other girls and is gang-raped; the episode ends with Saki being chained in a cell of her own.

=== Operation 07: Yellow Star ===
The plot centres around the addiction of a student called Ayana to a drug called 'Yellow Star' and the sexual demands of every man she encounters. Schoolgirl Ayana talks excitedly about her new stepfather - a famous detective and 'hero' in local media. He is introduced to Ayana by her mother and is seen ogling her during lunch. The detective is mysterious and furtive though both Ayana and her mother seem oblivious to how dangerous he is. He has been investigating the distribution of an illegal drug, called "Yellow Star" (Note: Full title: Ierō Sutā (イエロースター; Yellow Star)), which is a mild hallucinogen, paralyzing agent, and extraordinary aphrodisiac. Ayana brags about how big her new father is to her boyfriend, Kohei, who asks how big his gun is. The detective is revealed to be corrupt, killing a competitor on a train by placing an explosive device near him. He latterly thanks two shadowy figures who provided him with both the explosive and a supply of "yellow star". He grows closer to Ayana and hatches various plans, spying on her intimately. It becomes apparent that the detective is buying a steady supply of the illegal drug as part of a long-term strategy to sexually abuse Ayana. Following a promise to Kohei that she will allow him to take her virginity after their exams are completed, the detective traps her in his basement, secretly drugs her with Yellow Star and proceeds to rape her. The ensuing days detail the escalation of the abuse as Ayana herself becomes addicted to both Yellow Star and her new stepfather's increasingly violent sexual fantasies. Ayana's abuse culminates in her father taking her to a strange location, where she questions his intention while still expecting to have sex. He admits that his colleagues have become jealous of his relationship with Ayana and have now demanded they be allowed to rape her for his continued access to the drug. Ayana is then introduced to the two well-endowed thugs who gang rape her with her stepfather as leader. Aroused by both the drug and their violence, Ayana responds to their perverse demands with a level of sexual dexterity hitherto unrealised by the youngster. As a powerful aphrodisiac, Yellow Star heightens Ayana's own sexual appetite and the prolonged 'rape' ends with all three ejaculating inside her. After the incident, Ayana realizes the abuse will continue with more rape and drug abuse. The Detective attempts to persuade her that she enjoys such encounters and that he has more to show her. She maintains it is purely her response to the drug and angrily breaks free from his grasp. She kills him on a rooftop using his gun and the explosive device saved from the train. She returns to a normal life with boyfriend Kohei. Days later, Ayana waits in a park for Kohei (who believes she has remained a virgin for him) but is abducted minutes before they can meet. Kohei searches in vain for his missing girlfriend but she is vanished. The two men who kidnapped her are revealed to be the original shadowy well-endowed distributors of "yellow star" and force her into another abusive encounter with them. In the final scene, Ayana is seen being forced by the two thugs to return to abusing Yellow Star, before being stripped and double-penetrated. It is implied that their endless supply of Yellow Star will equate to Ayana's endless gang-rape and increasingly dominant sexuality resurfacing.

The character designer for this episode was Yasuomi Umetsu. It can be seen as a precursor to Kite.

In a scene cut from the original, the two Yellow Star manufacturers are shown to be demanding to engage in sexual activity with Ayana as their price for access to the drug.

=== Operation 08: Slave Warrior Maya I ===
The first of a two-episode story arc and based from manga series of the same name (Note: Full title: Dorei Senshi Maya (奴隷戦士マヤ; Slave Warrior Maya)), this episode begins the story of Maya Mizutani (水谷マヤ, Mizutani Maya), an average Japanese college student who is transported to an alternate dimension and inadvertently fulfills a prophecy. Maya is transported to another world, where she meets two lizard-like creatures who use trickery to convince her to take all of her clothes off where she is sold into slavery to Lord Estilgar, and used in experiments to turn her into a sex slave. She escapes and evades recapture by using a hidden power within herself to slaughter her opponents. This display of power gets the attention of two warring human and alien factions. Maya is recaptured, subjected to more sexual experiments, and is transformed into a hermaphrodite.

=== Operation 09: Slave Warrior Maya II ===
Continuing the story, Maya is transferred to a dominatrix who is given instructions to break her will and turn her into a sex slave. About this time, two members from one of the human factions are sent to investigate the power that was unleashed by Maya, citing a prophecy of a warrior long held in their culture. In captivity, Maya meets another slave, Leyna, who is not used for sex (until the end of the episode). They escape, but are quickly caught. Leyna is punished through sexual intercourse. Meanwhile, the dominatrix implants a parasitic alien mass into Maya's uterus through her mechanically stretched vagina to lower her inhibitions and forces her to copulate with Leyna. As she is about to succumb to her sexual desires, Maya unleashes her hidden power and becomes the warrior prophesied.

=== Operation 10: Binding ===
Masaki Hoshino, a writer for a magazine publishing company is traveling on a train to go on a trip, while dreaming about having sex with a woman he has never met named Miyuki. When he wakes up, he finds that his belongings have been stolen and that he is stranded when a short earthquake has caused a landslide to block off the tracks. Masaki follows the same young girl who had stolen his things, which leads him to her mansion, where she lives with a group of other women. Masaki stays the night and soon realizes that he has stumbled into a S&M situation. The oldest woman is the mistress of the house and the younger women are her slaves. This leads to his voyeuristic observation of various sexual acts, before actually engaging in sex with several of the residents. Eventually there's another earthquake which destroys the house, though Masaki and one of the girls manage to escape. The episode ends with the two of them walking along the train tracks before a train roars towards them. Right before impact however, Masaki wakes up, still on the train with his sketch book in his lap and his belongings sitting next to him. He opens the book and sees a drawing of the girl who left with him.

=== Operation 11: Fallen Angel Rina ===
Pop idol Rina Yuki is renowned for her amazing stage shows and musical talent, which gets her noticed by a new production company, Angel Productions. At one of her concerts, she learns that her father has suffered a medical emergency, and has been hospitalized. Kurosaki, the manager of Angel Productions approaches her about switching to their company, and after learning her father owes the company a substantial amount of money and that the company is apparently part of a mob-related conglomerate, she agrees to sign on with them.

It turns out that AngelPro also works in the flesh peddling business, and under the guise of giving her a "new image", they begin to train Rina through public humiliation scenarios and outfits. Among these humiliations she is molested on a public subway, taken to a sex shop pretending to be a porn actress, and masturbates in a porn cinema. Once her training has culminated, she's auctioned off at a BDSM auction as a sex slave for 580 million yen (roughly US$5.9 million). Six months later she returns to her normal life and career as a singer. The manager and his assistant/slave are backstage, discussing how Rina turned out to be a good buy. In the backstage it is revealed her father had already died during her training.

At the end of her performance, Rina strips and begins masturbating with her microphone before finally losing her mind. The representatives from AngelPro walk off, and Rina's manager collapses to the floor in disbelief. The final shot shows the all-male audience rushing towards the stage and crowding around her as she smiles vacantly, with a tear streaming down her cheek.

== Japanese voices ==
- Ryoka Yuzuki as Ai Yuki
- Ikue Ohtani as Kana
- Kaoru Shimamura as Rui
- Sumie Baba as Kirei
- Kunihiko Yasui as Dabide
- Kumiko Nishihara as Maya Mizutani
- Masako Katsuki as Eluma & Eri
- Mika Kanai as Younger Sister
- Shihori Niwa as Bunny Girl
- Tsutomu Kashiwakura as Sakai
- Yoko Asada as Cat Girl, Marino Ōkura, & Minako
- Yūko Kobayashi as Female Teacher
- Yumiko Shibata as Sana Fujisawa
- Yuriko Yamaguchi as Miran

== English voices ==
- Brad Affleck as Man 2
- Brandi Delmar as Saki
- Candi Washington as Haruka
- Chris Sands as Fujisawa, Garius, & Takayuki
- Cliff Kirk as Jackle
- Collin Floyd as Boy
- Deb Harris as Bunny Girl & Cat Girl
- Drew Jolie as Momomi
- Eva Christensen as Rui, Mayu, Marino Ohkura, Kana/Asami, & Eluma
- Petra Kosic as Kirei, Maya Mizutani, Ryoko
- Fanny Pakwhin as Ai Yuki
- Fergus Lawless as Lord Zeon, Man 1, Masaki Hoshino
- Genghis Holmes as Kohei
- Harry Lanyard as Lord Glassmeyer
- Jason Liberte as Dabide & Kurosaki
- Joseph Bakeoff as Heckle
- Laura Lawless as Miyuki & Rina Yuki
- Margeaux Heartman as Ayana, Diana, & Leyna
- Rita Moore as Eiri
- Shamus Lawless as Hiroyuki Sawawatari
- Tacey Spankee as Mina
- Vita La Dorne as Ayaka

== Release history ==
Broadway released the series on DVD in Japan.

Critical Mass Video licensed the series in August 1998. They released the first episode and a box set of all the episodes on November 3. Their 10th Anniversary DVD sets were the first to include an English dub.

Imports of this series can not be legally brought into Canada due to its exploitation of sex.
