= Sumie Baba =

Japanese voice actress

Sumie Baba (馬場 澄江, Baba Sumie, born December 12, 1967 in Tokyo Metropolis) is a Japanese voice actress affiliated with 81 Produce.

== Filmography ==
- Shimarisu-kun in Bonobono (first film)
- Chisa Tsukamoto in Comic Party (TV), Comic Party Revolution (TV & OAV)
- Hiroshi in Hamtaro (TV)
- Kirei in Cool Devices (OAV)
- Nami in Jungle de Ikou! (OAV)
- Anna (young) in Master Keaton (TV) (ep.6)
- Toshiko's Mother in Chibi Maruko-chan (TV)
- Mei-Fah in Vampire Princess Miyu (TV) (ep.16)
