= Kaoru Shimamura =

Japanese voice actress (1969–2013)

- Born: Hiroko Takahashi; April 15, 1969; Yokohama, Japan
- Died: February 26, 2013 (aged 43); Yokohama, Japan
- Occupation: Voice actress

Hiroko Takahashi (高橋 浩子, Takahashi Hiroko; April 15, 1969 – February 26, 2013), better known by the stage name Kaoru Shimamura (嶋村 カオル, Shimamura Kaoru), was a Japanese voice actress affiliated with 81 Produce.

Shimamura died on February 26, 2013, from breast cancer at a Yokohama hospital at the age of 43.

== Filmography ==
=== Television animation ===
- Genesis Survivor Gaiarth (1992) (unlisted role in episode 3)
- Moldiver (1993) (Nastassja)
- Nintama Rantaro (1993) (Nintama)
- Captain Tsubasa J (1994) (Mamoru Izawa (young))
- Genocyber (1994) (Ratto)
- Macross 7 (1994) (Rex)
- Ping-Pong Club (1995) (Sayuri Ichijo, Sachiko Inoue, Miyuki Chiba, Hanadai, Onizuka, Sato, Ishizaka, Kaoru's Mother, Takashi's Mother)
- Wedding Peach (1995) (child in episodes 27, 29, and 30; Miss Kihara; Musashino-sensei in episode 2)
- Battle Skipper (1995) (Sister)
- New Cutie Honey (1995) (Suzie 7: episode 7)
- Devil Lady (1998) (Ran Asuka)

Unknown date

- Atashin'chi (Ogawa Sensei (second))
- Chibi Maruko-chan (Ueda)
- Cool Devices (Rui: Operation 4)
- Chrome Shelled Regios (Ramis)
- Detective Conan (Kyoko Takahata)
- Fancy Lala (Host: episode 5)
- Kaikan Phrase (fan in episode 43, young Sakuya in episode 41)
- Kenichi: The Mightiest Disciple (Kyoko Ono)
- My Sexual Harassment (Annette)
- The Gigolo - Dochinpira (unnamed role)
- Yoiko (Mama)

=== Theatrical animation ===
- Macross Plus: Movie Edition (1995) (Additional voices)
- Crayon Shin-chan: Pursuit of the Balls of Darkness (1997) (Hostess)

Unknown date

- Crayon Shin-chan: Arashi wo Yobu Utau Ketsu dake Bakudan! (Airport Announcer)
- Crayon Shin-chan: Bakuhatsu! Onsen Wakuwaku Daikessen (Female Caster)
