= Kite (1998 film) =

1998 Japanese original video animation (OVA)

- North American DVD cover by Kitty Media (rare 18+ version of Kite Remastered)

A カイト (A Kaito)
- Genre: Crime; Girls with guns; Hentai
- Original video animation
- Directed by: Yasuomi Umetsu
- Produced by: Osamu Koshinaka; Tarō Miyabe
- Written by: Yasuomi Umetsu
- Music by: An Fū
- Studio: ARMS
- Licensed by: AUS: Madman Entertainment; NA: Discotek Media
- Released: February 25, 1998 – October 25, 1998
- Runtime: 53 minutes (uncensored); 48 minutes (censored)
- Episodes: 2 (Japanese release); 1 (International releases)

Kite, also known as A Kite (Japanese: A カイト) in Japan, is a 1998 adult original video animation written and directed by Yasuomi Umetsu. Two 25-minute episodes were released on VHS on February 25 and October 25, 1998, respectively. However, subsequent releases, including all three DVD releases in the United States, have edited the OVA into a film.

== Plot ==
Young schoolgirl Sawa is orphaned in her early teens following the gruesome murder of her parents. She goes on a date with a celebrity, during which he angrily confronts an elderly woman who had admonished him for dating such a young girl. Sawa kills him, and the woman dies of a heart attack while feeling around for her glasses in the bloody aftermath. Sawa's legal guardians, Akai and Kanie, are the detectives investigating the crime. Akai has engaged in a sexual relationship with Sawa for the duration of his guardianship and has gifted her a pair of crystal earrings, allegedly containing the blood of her parents.

Akai and Kanie train Sawa to become an assassin; over the years, she kills whomever they order her to, including corrupt police officers and corporate fat cats. Sawa's murders are infamous among police for her use of special bullets that explode inside the body after piercing the skin.

Eventually, Sawa meets fellow assassin Oburi, who is around her age, and quickly befriends him. Inspired by Oburi, Sawa gains the confidence to escape her guardians and set out on her own. Oburi resigns from Akai and Kanie's employment after killing three more targets, but Akai orders Sawa to kill Oburi before he can. Oburi confides to Sawa that Akai and Kanie were the ones behind the murders of her parents, but Sawa admits she has known this for years.

Sawa spares Oburi and sets out to kill her next target. In the ensuing scuffle with the target's bodyguards, she loses one of her earrings and sustains several injuries. When Oburi returns alive, Kanie sends him after a corrupt district attorney who turns out to be a SWAT officer. He nearly kills Oburi before Sawa arrives and saves him. Oburi tells Akai that he and Sawa are both resigning, but Akai overpowers and savagely beats him. Sawa comes to Oburi's rescue again, but is captured by Akai and Kanie. Akai decides that he wishes to punish Oburi in ways beyond simply killing him, and forces him to watch as he bloodily rapes Sawa. When Kanie drags Oburi off afterward, Akai expresses admiration toward the complexity of Sawa's plan to kill Oburi and admits that he almost believed her act. He tells her where Kanie plans to kill Oburi and that he is looking forward to finding Oburi's body. Sawa then leaves, claiming to have an exam the next day.

The next morning, Akai arrives at a murder scene and discovers that the dead body is Kanie's, much to his shock. One of the investigators reminds him that this is the same location where the double murder of a teenage girl's parents occurred several years prior. Akai goes to the location where Kanie had taken Oburi, but instead finds Sawa, who shoots at him repeatedly, completely emptying the magazines of both her and Oburi's guns. She then tosses both guns into the sewer before removing her remaining earring and discarding it as well.

Before Oburi and Sawa can reunite, Oburi is shot by another presumed child assassin. Sawa waits patiently for Oburi's return at his loft in an abandoned building. She hears a footstep and creaking floorboard, and turns her head to look at the source of the noise before the screen goes black.

== Cast ==
Cast
Character	Japanese	English
Sawa	Kotomi Naruse	Charlie Watson
Oburi	Shingo Oyamada	Shane Callahan
Akai	Gorou Shibusawa	Dave Underwood
Kanie	Tatsuo Matoba	Chuck Denson Jr.
Comedian 1	Hiroshi Aida	Jeff Johnston
Old Lady	Michiko Yamaguchi	Ann Connel
Investigator	Takayuki Hiramatsu	Sean P. O'Connell
Comedian 2	Nobuyuki Takano	Marc Matney
Reporter	Tomoko Furakawa	Heather Laska
Street Kid 1 / Boy	Naho Hirokawa	David Pickelsiemer
Street Kid 2 / Girl	Itsumi Sawada	Rachael Seidman
Molester		Les Jenkins
Twin 1	Jackie Sylvester (English)	unchanged
Twin 2	Richard O'Sullivan (English)	Rick Sisk
Bodyguard 1	Douglas Cartwright (English)	Daniel Richani
Bodyguard 2	William Rain (English)	J.R. Rodriguez
Bodyguard 3	Gary Wynn-Jones (English)	Kevin Potts
Detective 1		Scott Bailey
Detective 2		Bob Edwards
Prosecutor		Paul Johnson

Additional voices

English: Daniel Richani, Larry Tobias, Paul Johnson, Tamara Burnham-Mercer

== Release history ==
A Kite was first released on VHS in Japan on February 25, 1998, and October 25, 1998, and was released on DVD in Japan on July 25 and December 18, 1998. An edited version titled A Kite: International Version was released on DVD in Japan on July 25, 2000. Another DVD set titled A Kite: Premium Collectors Version was released by Happinet on December 21, 2007. A DVD and Blu-Ray set titled A Kite Special Edition was released in Japan on April 3, 2015.

Three versions have been released in North America: the general release version, which was first released on VHS in May 1999 and DVD on April 25, 2000; a "Director's Cut" version that contains nearly 10 minutes of explicit footage, which was released on DVD on January 29, 2002, by Media Blasters' adult label, Kitty Media; and a "Special Edition" that contains Kite in its original, uncut form, which was first released on DVD on September 28, 2004. Media Blasters later re-released both the general release and the Director's cut versions on Blu-ray separately in 2014 and 2017, respectively. On August 3, 2024, Discotek Media announce their license to the Kite film series starting with the 1998 film and will release three versions of the anime, including an "International" version that was never released in the US, on Blu-ray in September 2024.

Kite was released on DVD in Australia on September 21, 2005, and in New Zealand on September 11, 2005, by Madman Entertainment.

Due to Norway's strict child pornography laws, Kite has been banned due to a graphic scene of sexual assault on a minor.

== Sequel ==
A sequel entitled Kite Liberator features a different cast of characters including a new character named Monaka Noguchi. It was released on April 8, 2008, in the United States and Japan and bundled with Kite: Director's Cut. Kite Liberator along with Kite were released in December 2013 on Netflix.

== Live-action film ==
A live action film adaptation of Kite was reported to be in various stages of pre-production for several years, with American film director Rob Cohen attached as either director or producer. On September 2, 2011, David R. Ellis took the helm for the remake. On December 17, 2012, Samuel L. Jackson announced that he was the first to join the cast of Ellis's Kite, with filming taking place in Johannesburg. The film, which takes place in a post-financial collapse corrupt society, follows a girl who tries to track down her father's killer with help from his ex-partner. On February 3, 2013, Ralph Ziman took over as director of the film after Ellis died on January 7, 2013; actors India Eisley and Callan McAuliffe subsequently joined the cast. On May 10, 2013, The Weinstein Company acquired worldwide distribution rights for Kite, with a release date of August 25, 2014.

== Reception ==
Critical reception of Kite has been generally positive. Helen McCarthy in 500 Essential Anime Movies called Kite a "shocking story of violence, abuse and perverted self-justification". THEM Anime Reviews gave the Director's Cut of Kite a 4 out of 5 star rating, praising the story, character development, animation and action sequences, but criticized the character designs, stating that "everyone but Sawa (possibly Oburi) is monstrously ugly." They also stated that they only recommended the Director's Cut for those of age to watch it.

Anime News Network gave Kite a perfect A+ rating, praising the story, animation, artwork, character development and Yasuomi Umetsu's writing, with their only complaints being that it was too short and that the excessive violence and sex scenes may be too much for some. They concluded that "Kite has enough originality to stand on its own, and in the land of animation, there are really no competitors. No animation I've seen to date has achieved the level of gritty realism along with the satisfying level of suspense and depraved beauty as this one."

== In popular culture ==
Kill Bill writer and director Quentin Tarantino recommended Kite as part of actress Chiaki Kuriyama's preparations for her role as Gogo Yubari in the first film.

Several scenes in the music video directed by Hype Williams for the song "Ex-Girlfriend" by No Doubt are based on Kite.

The Velvet Acid Christ song "Pretty Toy" samples one of Akai's lines from the English dub.

== See also ==
- Mezzo Forte—Umetsu's second anime OVA, which also concerns a young woman working as an assassin, and a cameo by Sawa.
  - Mezzo DSA—television series based on Mezzo Forte.
- Cool Devices: Yellow Star, previously directed by Umetsu, features "prototype" character designs, and similar subject matter.
- Legal status of fictional pornography depicting minors
