= Yasuomi Umetsu =

Japanese animator (born 1960)

- 梅津 泰臣
- Born: December 19, 1960 (age 65); Fukushima Prefecture, Japan
- Other name: Touboku Akutagawa (芥川倒木)
- Occupations: animator, director, writer, storyboard artist
- Years active: 1981–present
- Employers: Tsuchida Production (~1980); Arms (1998~2015) Pierrot Plus (2015~2017) Shaft (2017~)
- Known for: Kite series Mezzo series Wizard Barristers

Yasuomi Umetsu (梅津 泰臣, Umetsu Yasuomi; born December 19, 1960) is a Japanese animator, director, writer, and storyboard artist.

== Career ==
Umetsu studied at the Chiyoda Gakuen Educational Corporation and was originally not interested in pursuing a career in the anime industry, and instead wanted to pursue a career as a manga artist. While in his 20s, he drew a short manga for Kodansha and decided to give up on pursuing manga due to feeling that it wasn't for him. After graduating from vocational school, he had trouble finding a job, and was introduced to Tsuchida Production through the head of the department at his school, but he felt that the company's style didn't suit him and did work for other companies in the industry eventually resulting in his firing after 1–2 months.

Following his brief employment with Tsuchida Production, Umetsu became involved with Toei Animation where he worked as an in-between animator and 2nd key animator for projects like Arcadia of My Youth (1982) and the 1981 American Spider-Man series. At the studio, he worked in the same room as Masami Suda, whom Umetsu learned much from in regard to key animation. Eventually, he was promoted to animation director for Stop!! Hibari-kun! (1983); however, his seniors at the company gave him a hard time since he was only 23 years old. When he became too uncomfortable with the environment, he moved to Madhouse, as he had an interest in working on Harmagaddon (1983) due to the involvement of Katsuhiro Otomo as character designer and had been invited by Masao Maruyama to work with the company. During his time with Madhouse, he was also influenced by director Yoshiaki Kawajiri, who taught him to consciously think about perspective and eye level. He participated in Megazone 23 (1985) as an animator and storyboard artist and was subsequently asked to do the original character designs for the bikers in Part II (1986), but he ended up doing the main characters for fun as well. He showed the president of AIC, Tooru Miura, and director Ichiro Itano, and the two opted to use Umetsu's designs for all of the characters. Following this decision, Umetsu apologized to the character designer of the first OVA, Toshiki Hirano. Umetsu was left dissatisfied with his work on the OVA as chief animation director as much of the work was left incomplete and didn't participate as an animation director again until 1987 when he was invited by Hiroyuki Kitakubo to participate on the Robot Carnival anthology. His contribution to the Robot Carnival anthology also marked his debut as a writer and director. Initially, Umetsu had no interest in being a director, but the idea of being able to edit every shot if needed and building his own worldview appealed to him.

Following Robot Carnival, however, Umetsu had no specific interest in continuing his work as a director and instead looked for more animation jobs. He described the works he took on during this time, like Grave of the Fireflies and Akira (1988), as being "lonely and painful", or being otherwise dissatisfied with his own work. Especially with Akira, Umetsu said he felt an intense frustration that exposed his weaknesses but felt some accomplishment under the impression that director Katsuhiro Otomo was satisfied with some of the cuts he had submitted. Due to these frustrations, he gradually shifted into a directing role.

Throughout the 1980s and early-to-mid 1990s, Umetsu continued to work on projects as an animator, animation director, and character designer. Two particular works were OVAs made at Tatsunoko Production and based on already-existing IPs from the studio, but he felt that director Yukihiro Matsushita (who was in charge of both) did not have a love for the works, so when the job for another OVA (New Hurricane Polymar, 1996) was given to him, he asked for help from J.C.Staff in producing the series and for them to lend a director. J.C.Staff provided the project with director Akiyuki Shinbo, who himself was a fan of Tatsuo Yoshida (Tatsunoko Production's founder) and other works the studio had made. Unlike the previous OVAs, Shinbo used bande dessinée as the basis of his inspiration; and despite such a change, Umetsu stated that he thought that the team succeeded in creating the atmosphere that Shinbo wanted. Reminiscing on the project, Shinbo noted that near the end of its production, Umetsu had once come up to him with an uncolored cel and asked him about colors, as Umetsu intended to color it himself.

In 1995, Umetsu was involved with the Cool Devices hentai anthology under the name Touboku Akutagawa in which he created, wrote, designed the characters, and drew the storyboards for the episode titled Yellow Star. Although he was not the director of the project or extensively involved beyond the pre-production aspects, the project led to an offer to create and direct another erotic anime, which eventually became Kite produced by Arms. The film was released in several versions, but there are two prominent editions: an R-18 hentai version released in two-parts, and a single international version which removes the sexual content. Though the film has received much controversy for its sexual abuse content, the film has been praised as well. A writer from Anime News Network described it as a "painful, violent beauty", with note of its "gritty realism" in style and atmosphere and "expertly told" storytelling. The film has also inspired several works in the west. For example, several scenes in the music video directed by Hype Williams for the song "Ex-Girlfriend" by No Doubt are based on Kite; and director-writer Quentin Tarantino recommended Kite as part of actress Chiaki Kuriyama's preparations for her role as Gogo Yubari in the first Kill Bill (2003) film. While Umetsu continued to work freelance (not directly belonging to a studio through employment), he produced his most major works with Arms for the next decade: a second hentai OVA (also with a cut international version) titled Mezzo Forte (2000); and a sequel television series, Mezzo DSA (2004). He also contributed the character designs to Nakoruru: Ano Hito kara no Okurimono (2002), studio Arms' first non-hentai work.

Umetsu's next project was a planned film with Arms titled Kiss and Cry. Issues in the development of the project halted it and a producer from the studio offered him the opportunity to create the ending animation for High School Girls (2005), which started Umetsu's popularity as a director for openings and ending for the next two decades. Kiss and Cry, however, never premiered and was never officially cancelled. Umetsu again tried to realize the project with a different production studio, but those plans also fell through.

Although Kiss and Cry struggled to find a producer, Umetsu was asked to create a "sequel" to Kite with Arms titled Kite Liberator (2008). A single OVA was produced and sold, but the story was left unfinished. According to Umetsu, Kite Liberator the OVA fell short of its sales goal and a sequel project was not greenlit. Speaking about Kite Liberator with Shinbo, Umetsu found issue with the amount of work he undertook. As the director, character designer, screenwriter, and various other production roles were all handled by him, he was constantly overworking himself. He described Kite Liberator as "hell" to work on because of the workload, saying that he spent an entire year without taking any Sundays off and sometimes slept at the studio for five days straight. In spite of the overwork, Kite Liberator is distinct in that it was Umetsu's first attempt to utilize 3DCG animation and a more contemporary style of work. For the 3DCG in the film, the team collaborated with Digital Frontier, whom Umetsu was aware of due to their work on the 2006 Death Note live-action films.

Sometime in the late 2000s, he was also offered a job as director for an original anime collaboration between Production I.G and Masamune Shirow by I.G president Mitsuhisa Ishikawa. The project was put on hold and seemingly never came to fruition, and Umetsu had few opportunities to work with Production I.G besides that. He later directed a segment of Dante's Inferno: An Animated Epic (2010) and the opening to Blood-C (2011).

With various projects stalled or without a greenlight, Umetsu moved onto new projects. He created a pilot film for Wizard Barristers (2014) in the early 2010s to showcase in an attempt to greenlight a series through talks with several production companies, which was difficult. During that time, A-1 Pictures producer Jouji Seita approached Umetsu for an original project since Umetsu had directed an opening for the studio's Valkyria Chronicles (2009) anime, which became Galileo Donna (2013). Both projects started production simultaneously as Wizard Barristers was able to find backing from Pony Canyon. Umetsu tried to allocate the labor more evenly among his collaborators in Galilei Donna. Though he created and directed the series, and was personally involved with other aspects of it, the character designs were instead done by Shingo Adachi, and the screenplay was split between four writers. However, the series was cut down from its original two season plan to just 11 episodes. Wizard Barristers, on the other hand, was being produced by longtime collaborator Arms; however, due to production issues that delayed work, the schedule tightened which forced Umetsu to directly oversee the animation as a chief animation director, which he humored was going to kill him. The series' delays led to much of the work in later episodes being unfinished and needing extensive revision for the Blu-Ray and DVD release.

Arms stopped producing series in 2017, and most of its staff seemingly left the company or joined its sister studio at Pierrot Plus (now Studio Signpost), with the company itself changed its name to Common Sense (keeping Arms as a trade name); and in 2020, the company officially filed for bankruptcy.

After his last major work in 2014, Umetsu continued to contribute mainly to openings and endings to various series and occasionally participating as a key animator for some works. In 2015, for example, Umetsu directed the opening to Gourmet Girl Graffiti. He also designed the characters for Pierrot's Dynamic Chord (2017) and made the character design drafts for Kokkoku (2018).

By 2017, Umetsu had a position at both Pierrot Plus (which had absorbed much of Arms' staff as its sister company) and Shaft, and was working from both locations, but by 2018 Umetsu had fully moved Shaft. Shinbo had originally asked Umetsu to direct several openings for him and the studio in the 2000s, but scheduling conflicts got in the way until he had the opportunity to direct the opening for And Yet the Town Moves (2010). The series was a precedant for Umetsu's future work with the studio as he found the company's coloring and digital photography (compositing) style to be appealing. However, as he was working on both Galilei Donna and Wizard Barristers at the time, he opted not to move forward with any project ideas. It wasn't until Wizard Barristers ended that he approached Shaft president Mitsutoshi Kubota with three ideas, of which Kubota selected one.After receiving the greenlight, he was asked to do the opening for the aforementioned Gourmet Girl Graffiti and continued contributing at other studios for the next three years. His work output halted in 2018 as his appearances, at other studios and at Shaft, diminished. He did key animation for some episodes of Magia Record (2020–2022) and was directly named by series assistant director Midori Yoshizawa as one of the contributing artists to the final episode. In 2021, he directed the opening to Pretty Boy Detective Club, which Shinbo said he was proud of despite the shorter production period he described it having. He participated in the Shaft-outsourced episode of The Café Terrace and its Goddesses in 2023 to support episode director Kouji Matsumura, a friend of his who was formerly at Pierrot Plus and Arms and had moved to Shaft in the mid-2010s. That year, he also contributed to The Quintessential Quintuplets∽ due to Matsumura directing an episode. Alongside Shouji Saeki, Umetsu has also had a strong influence on the younger staff according to animator Kazuya Shiotsuki.

The project was finally unveiled in 2024 as a film series titled Virgin Punk, with its first part slated for a summer 2025 release. According to Umetsu, the project started pre-production at the end of 2014.

== Style ==
Describing his own philosophies in his work, Umetsu has said that he avoids being too self-satisfying or too self-indulgent, but that he also is conscious of not making something that he's dissatisfied otherwise the "customers" (audience) to his "restaurant" (works) will be unhappy. He also feels that his works have been limited due to the state of the industry. In particular, he states that there are few animators who are good at action sequences, and Umetsu's works tend to have many action sequences in them. With an oversaturation of works being made and too little resources to cover them all, resources in general can be hard to come by; and in response to this, Umetsu has considered relying more on 3DCG animation and consciously making the decision to have less action scenes to make up for the lack of action animators.

Director Akiyuki Shinbo, himself regarded for his color style by Umetsu, has noted Umetsu's particular use of color as well.

== Works ==
"In Director(s)" column highlights Umetsu's directorial works.

=== Television series ===
Year	Title	Director(s)	Studio	CD (Note: Character designer.)	SB (Note: Storyboard artist.)	ED (Note: Episode director.)	AD (Note: Animation director.)	KA (Note: Key animator.)	Other roles and notes	Ref(s)
1981	Spider-Man	—N/a	—N/a	No	No	No	No	No	In-between animator	
1981	Tiger Mask II	Kouzou Morishita	Toei Animation	No	No	No	No	No	In-between animator	
1982	Arcadia of My Youth: Endless Orbit SSX	Tomoharu Katsumata; Masamitsu Sasaki	Toei Animation	No	No	No	No	Yes		
1984	Galactic Patrol Lensman	Hiroshi Fukutomi	Madhouse	No	No	No	Yes	Yes		
1984	Fist of the North Star	Toyoo Ashida	Toei Animation	No	No	No	No	Yes	Uncredited	
1985	Zeta Gundam	Yoshiyuki Tomino	Sunrise	No	No	No	No	Yes	Ending	
2002	Ghost in the Shell: Stand Alone Complex	Kenji Kamiyama	Production I.G	No	No	No	No	Yes		
2003	Last Exile	Koichi Chigira	Gonzo	No	No	No	No	Yes		
2003	R.O.D the TV	Koji Masunari	J.C.Staff	No	No	No	Yes	Yes		
2004	Mezzo DSA	Yasuomi Umetsu	Arms	Yes	Yes	Yes	Yes	Yes	Original creator Screenplay	
2004	Elfen Lied	Mamoru Kanbe	Arms	No	No	No	No	Yes		
2004	Beck: Mongolian Chop Squad	Osamu Kobayashi	Madhouse	No	No	No	Yes	No		
2004	Bleach	Noriyuki Abe	Pierrot	No	No	No	No	Yes		
2004	Magical Girl Lyrical Nanoha	Akiyuki Shinbo	Seven Arcs	No	No	No	No	Yes		
2005	Trinity Blood	Tomohiro Hirata	Gonzo	No	No	No	No	Yes		
2006	High School Girls	Yoshitaka Fujimoto	Arms	No	No	No	No	No	Ending director, storyboard artist, & key animator	
2006	Welcome to the N.H.K.	Yuusuke Yamamoto	Gonzo	No	No	No	No	Yes	Opening	
2007	Ikki Tousen: Dragon Destiny	Koichi Ohata	Arms	No	No	No	No	Yes		
2008	Casshern Sins	Shigeyasu Yamauchi	Madhouse	No	No	No	No	Yes		
2008	Hyakko	Michio Fukuda	Nippon Animation	No	No	No	No	Yes		
2008	Kannagi: Crazy Shrine Maidens	Yutaka Yamamoto	A-1 Pictures	No	No	No	No	Yes		
2009	Valkyria Chronicles	Yasutaka Yamamoto	A-1 Pictures	No	No	No	No	No	Opening director, storyboard artist, & animation director	
2009	Pandora Hearts	Takao Kato	Xebec	No	No	No	No	Yes		
2009	Queen's Blade: The Exiled Virgin	Kinji Yoshitomo	Arms	No	No	No	No	Yes		
2009	Tokyo Magnitude 8.0	Masaki Tachibana	Bones; Kinema Citrus	No	No	No	No	Yes		
2009	Tegami Bachi	Akira Iwanaga	Pierrot+	No	No	No	No	Yes		
2010	And Yet the Town Moves	Akiyuki Shinbo	Shaft	No	No	No	No	No	Opening director, storyboard artist, animation director, & key animator	
2010	Tegami Bachi Reverse	Akira Iwanaga	Pierrot+	No	No	No	No	No	Ending director, storyboard artist, animation director, & key animator	
2010	Sound of the Sky	Mamoru Kanbe	A-1 Pictures	No	No	No	No	Yes		
2010	Shoka	Makoto Yamada	Production I.G	No	No	No	No	Yes		
2010	Working!!	Yoshimasa Hiraike	A-1 Pictures	No	No	No	No	Yes		
2010	Big Windup!	Tsutomu Mizushima	A-1 Pictures	No	No	No	No	No	2nd key animator	
2010	Occult Academy	Tomohiko Itō	A-1 Pictures	No	No	No	No	Yes		
2011	Beelzebub	Yoshihiro Takamoto	Pierrot+	No	No	No	No	No	Opening key animator Ending director, storyboard artist, & animation director	
2011	Blood-C	Tsutomu Mizushima	Production I.G	No	No	No	No	Yes	Opening director & storyboard artist	
2011	Fractale	Yutaka Yamamoto	A-1 Pictures; Ordet	No	No	No	No	Yes		
2011	Puella Magi Madoka Magica	Akiyuki Shinbo; Yukihiro Miyamoto	Shaft	No	No	No	No	Yes		
2011	Blue Exorcist	Tensei Okamura	A-1 Pictures	No	No	No	No	Yes		
2011	No.6	Kenji Nagasaki	Bones	No	No	No	No	Yes		
2011	The Idolmaster	Atsushi Nishigori	A-1 Pictures	No	No	No	No	Yes		
2011	Working'!!	Atsushi Ootsuki	A-1 Pictures	No	No	No	No	Yes		
2012	Aesthetica of a Rogue Hero	Rion Kujo	Arms	No	No	No	No	Yes		
2012	Code: Breaker	Yasuhiro Irie	Kinema Citrus	No	No	No	No	Yes		
2012	Blast of Tempest	Masahiro Andou	Bones	No	No	No	No	Yes		
2013	Galilei Donna	Yasuomi Umetsu	A-1 Pictures	No	Yes	Yes	No	No	Original creator Original concept	
2013	Maoyu	Takeo Takahashi	Arms	No	No	No	No	Yes		
2014	Wizard Barristers	Yasuomi Umetsu	Arms	Yes	Yes	Yes	Yes	No	Original concept Series composition Chief animation director Opening/ending director, storyboard artist, & animation director	
2015	Isuca	Akira Iwanaga	Arms	No	No	No	No	No	Ending director, storyboard artist, and key animator	
2015	Gourmet Girl Graffiti	Akiyuki Shinbo; Naoyuki Tatsuwa	Shaft	No	No	No	No	No	Opening director & storyboard artist	
2015	Seraph of the End	Daisuke Tokuda	Wit Studio	No	No	No	No	No	Opening director & storyboard artist	
2015	Gangsta.	Shūkō Murase; Kōichi Hatsumi	Manglobe	No	No	No	No	No	Ending story boarder and animator	
2015	Gunslinger Stratos	Shinpei Ezaki	A-1 Pictures	No	No	No	No	No	Ending director, storyboard artist, & key animator	
2015	Valkyrie Drive: Mermaid	Hiraku Kaneko	Arms	No	No	No	No	Yes		
2016	Dimension W	Kanta Kamei	3Hz	No	No	No	No	No	Opening director, storyboard artist, animation director, key animator, & in-between inspector	
2016	Bungo Stray Dogs	Takuya Igarashi	Bones	No	No	No	No	No	Ending director, storyboard artist, animation director, & key animator	
2016	Twin Star Exorcists	Tomohisa Taguchi	Pierrot	No	No	No	No	No	Opening director, storyboard artist, & animation director	
2016	Bungo Stray Dogs Season 2	Takuya Igarashi	Bones	No	No	No	No	No	Ending director, storyboard artist, & animation director	
2016	Touken Ranbu: Hanamaru	Takashi Naoya	Doga Kobo	No	No	No	No	No	Opening director	
2016	High School Fleet	Yuu Nobuta	Production IMS	No	No	No	No	Yes		
2016	The Morose Mononokean	Akira Iwanaga	Pierrot+	No	No	No	No	No	Eyecatch	
2016	Persona 5: The Animation - The Day Breakers	Takaharu Ozaki	A-1 Pictures	No	No	No	No	Yes		
2017	ēlDLIVE	Jouji Furuta	Pierrot	No	No	No	No	No	Ending director, storyboard artist, & animation director	
2017	Dynamic Chord	Shigenori Kageyama	Pierrot	Yes	No	No	No	No		
2018	Kokkoku: Moment by Moment	Yoshimitsu Oohashi	Geno Studio	No	No	No	No	No	Original character design Ending director & storyboard artist	
2018	Fate/Extra: Last Encore	Akiyuki Shinbo; Yukihiro Miyamoto	Shaft	No	No	No	No	Yes		
2020	Magia Record	Doroinu	Shaft	No	No	No	No	Yes		
2021	Pretty Boy Detective Club	Akiyuki Shinbo; Hajime Ootani	Shaft	No	No	No	No	No	Opening director, storyboard artist, & animation director	
2022	Magia Record: Dawn of a Shallow Dream	Doroinu; Yukihiro Miyamoto	Shaft	No	No	No	No	Yes		
2023	The Café Terrace and Its Goddesses	Satoshi Kuwabara	Tezuka Productions	No	No	No	No	Yes		
2023	Fate/strange Fake	Shun Enokido; Takahito Sakazume	A-1 Pictures	No	No	No	No	Yes		
2023	The Quintessential Quintuplets∽	Yukihiro Miyamoto	Shaft	No	No	No	No	Yes		

=== OVAs ===
Year	Title	Director(s)	Studio	CD	SB	ED	AD	KA	Other roles and notes	Ref(s)
1985	Megazone 23	Noboru Ishiguro	AIC; Artland	No	Yes	No	No	Yes		
1986	Megazone 23 Part II	Ichiro Itano	AIC; Artland; Artmic	(Original)	No	No	No	Yes	Chief animation director	
1986	Outlanders	Katsuhisa Yamada	Tatsunoko Production	No	No	No	No	Yes		
1987	Robot Carnival: Presence	Yasuomi Umetsu	Oh! Production	Yes	No	No	No	Yes	Screenplay	
1987	Lily C.A.T.	Hisayuki Toriumi	Pierrot	Yes	No	No	No	Yes		
1987	The Incredible Gyoukai Video Junk Boy	Katsuhisa Yamada	Madhouse	No	No	No	No	No	Ending animation	
1989	Cleopatra DC	Naoyuki Yoshinaga	J.C.Staff	No	No	No	No	Yes		
1989	Angel Cop	Ichiro Itano	DAST Corporation	No	No	No	Yes	No		
1989	Dog Soldier	Hiroyuki Ebata	J.C.Staff	No	No	No	No	Yes		
1990	Devilman: The Demon Bird	Tsutomu Iida	Oh! Production	No	No	No	No	Yes		
1990	Nineteen 19	Koichi Chigira	Madhouse	No	No	No	No	Yes		
1990	Angel	Hideki Takayama	Project Team Mu	No	No	No	No	Yes		
1990	The Hakkenden	Takashi Annou	AIC	No	No	No	No	Yes		
1991	Urotsukidoji II: Legend of the Demon Womb	Hideki Takayama	Project Team Mu	No	No	No	No	Yes		
1991	Yumemakura Baku Twilight Gekijou	Saeko Aoki	Pierrot	Yes	No	No	Yes	Yes		
1991	Soukou Kyojin Z-Knight	Fumihiko Takayama	Sunrise	Yes	No	No	Yes	Yes		
1991	Eiyuu Gaiden Mozaicka	Ryōsuke Takahashi	Studio Deen	No	No	No	No	Yes		
1992	Gensou Jotan Ellcia	Yoriyasu Kogawa	J.C.Staff	Yes	No	No	Yes	Yes		
1992	Oz	Katsuhisa Yamada	Madhouse	No	No	No	No	Yes		
1993	Casshan: Robot Hunter	Hiroyuki Fukushima	Tatsunoko Production	Yes	No	No	Yes	Yes		
1994	Tenshi Nanka Ja Nai	Hiroko Tokita	Group TAC	Yes	No	No	No	Yes	Chief animation director	
1994	Gatchaman	Hiroyuki Fukushima	Tatsunoko Production	Yes	No	No	Yes	No		
1994	Homeroom Affairs	Osamu Sekita	J.C.Staff	No	No	No	No	Yes		
1995	Cool Devices Operation 07: Yellow Star	Hiroshi Matsuda	Honey Dip	Yes	Yes	No	No	No	Original creator Screenplay	
1995	Kodocha	Iku Suzuki	J.C.Staff	No	No	No	No	Yes		
1996	Kimera	Kazu Yokota	Artland	Yes	No	No	Yes	No		
1996	Shin Hurricane Polymar	Akiyuki Shinbo	Tatsunoko Production	Yes	No	No	Yes	Yes	Ending storyboard artist & key animator	
1996	Starship Girl Yamamoto Yohko I	Akiyuki Shinbo	J.C.Staff	No	No	No	No	Yes	Cel-painting (uncredited)	
1996	Landlock	Yasuhiro Matsumoto	Sanctuary	No	No	No	No	Yes		
1997	Hen	Hiroshi Suzuki	Group TAC	Yes	No	No	No	No	Supervisor	
1997	Starship Girl Yamamoto Yohko II	Akiyuki Shinbo	J.C.Staff	No	No	No	No	Yes		
1997	Voogie's Angel	Masami Ōbari	J.C.Staff	No	No	No	No	Yes		
1998	Kite	Yasuomi Umetsu	Arms	Yes	Yes	Yes	Yes	Yes	Original creator Screenplay	
2000	Mezzo Forte	Yasuomi Umetsu	Arms	Yes	No	No	Yes	No	Original creator Screenplay	
2002	Read or Die	Koji Masunari	Studio Deen	No	No	No	No	Yes		
2002	Nakoruru ~Ano hito kara no okurimono~	Katsuma Kanazawa	Arms	Yes	No	No	No	Yes		
2003	Crimson Climax	Katsuma Kanazawa	Arms	No	No	No	No	Yes		
2008	Kite Liberator	Yasuomi Umetsu	Arms	Yes	Yes	Yes	Yes	Yes	Original creator Screenplay	

=== Films ===
Year	Title	Director(s)	Studio	CD	SB	ED	AD	KA	Other roles and notes	Ref(s)
1982	Queen Millennia	Nobutaka Nishizawa	Toei Animation	No	No	No	No	No	In-between animator	
1982	Arcadia of My Youth	Tomoharu Katsumata	Toei Animation	No	No	No	No	No	In-between check	
1982	Future War 198X	Tomoharu Katsumata; Toshio Masuda	Toei Animation	No	No	No	No	No	In-between animator	
1983	Genma Wars	Rintaro	Madhouse	No	No	No	No	Yes		
1983	Barefoot Gen	Mori Masaki	Madhouse	No	No	No	No	Yes		
1984	Wata no Kunihoshi	Shinichi Tsuji	Mushi Production	No	No	No	No	No	Assistant animation director	
1985	The Dagger of Kamui	Rintaro	Madhouse; Project Team Argos	No	No	No	No	Yes		
1986	Toki no Tabibito: Time Stranger	Mori Masaki	Madhouse	No	No	No	No	Yes		
1988	Mobile Suit Gundam: Char's Counterattack	Yoshiyuki Tomino	Sunrise	No	No	No	No	Yes		
1988	Akira	Katsuhiro Otomo	TMS Entertainment	No	No	No	No	Yes		
1988	Grave of the Fireflies	Isao Takahata	Studio Ghibli	No	No	No	No	Yes		
1990	A Wind Named Amnesia	Kazuo Yamazaki	Madhouse	No	No	No	No	Yes		
1991	Urusei Yatsura: Always My Darling	Katsuhisa Yamada	Madhouse	No	No	No	No	Yes		
1994	Darkside Blues	Toshiyasu Kogawa	J.C.Staff	No	No	No	No	Yes		
1998	Spriggan	Hirotsugu Kawasaki	Studio 4°C	No	No	No	No	Yes		
2002	A Tree of Palme	Takashi Nakamura	Palm Studio	No	No	No	No	Yes		
2010	Book Girl	Shunsuke Tada	Production I.G	No	No	No	No	Yes		
2010	Dante's Inferno: An Animated Epic	Various	Production I.G	No	No	No	No	No		
2012	Blood-C: The Last Dark	Naoyoshi Shiotani; Norihiro Naganuma	Production I.G	No	No	No	No	Yes		
2016	Kizumonogatari I: Tekketsu	Akiyuki Shinbo; Tatsuya Oishi	Shaft	No	No	No	No	Yes		
2017	Kizumonogatari III: Reiketsu	Akiyuki Shinbo; Tatsuya Oishi	Shaft	No	No	No	No	Yes		
2017	Fireworks	Akiyuki Shinbo; Nobuyuki Takeuchi	Shaft	No	No	No	No	Yes		
2018	Bungo Stray Dogs: Dead Apple	Takuya Igarashi	Bones	No	No	No	No	Yes		
2025	Virgin Punk	Yasuomi Umetsu	Shaft	Yes	Yes	Yes	Yes	Yes	Original creator Character concept	
2026	A New Dawn	Yoshitoshi Shinomiya	Studio Outrigger	No	No	No	No	No	Assistance	
2026	Puella Magi Madoka Magica: Walpurgisnacht - Rising	Akiyuki Shinbo; Yukihiro Miyamoto	Shaft	No	No	No	No	Yes	Main action animator	

=== Video games ===
- Contra: The Hard Corps (Mega Drive, 1994) – Packaging and promotional illustrations (Japanese version)
- Castlevania (Nintendo 64, 1999) – Promotional illustrations
- Shin Megami Tensei: Nine (Xbox, 2002) – Character designer
- Xenoblade Chronicles 2 (Nintendo Switch, 2017) – Illustrator

=== Manga ===
- Vegetables (1998)

== Notes ==
=== Web citations ===
- Hirota, Keisuke (December 25, 2021). 新作アニメ作品を制作中の梅津泰臣が語る「これまで」と「これから」【アニメ業界ウォッチング第85回】 [Yasuomi Umetsu, Who is Working on a New Animated Work, Talks About the "Past" and "Future" (Anime Industry Watching No.85)]. Akiba Souken. Archived from the original on December 9, 2022.

=== Book citations ===
- McCarthy, Helen (2009). 500 Essential Anime Movies: The Ultimate Guide. Harper Design. ISBN 978-0061474507.
- Shinbo, Akiyuki (July 27, 2012). 新房語 [Shinbogatari] (in Japanese). Ichijinsha. ISBN 978-4758012591.
- Aniplex (2021). Pretty Boy Detective Club Vol. 5 Special Booklet. Aniplex.
- Maeda, Hisashi; Nakagami, Yoshikatsu; Kawabata, Takeshi; Yonebayashi, Akiko (2022). マギアレコード 魔法少女まどか☆マギカ外伝 TVアニメ公式ガイドブック 2巻 [Magia Record Puella Magi Madoka Magica TV Anime Official Guidebook Volume 2] (in Japanese). Houbunsha. ISBN 978-4832272019.
- Umetsu, Yasuomi (August 25, 2025). Unfinished 梅津泰臣アニメーションワークス [Unfinished: Yasuomi Umetsu Animation Works] (in Japanese). Genkosha.
