= Galilei Donna =

Television anime

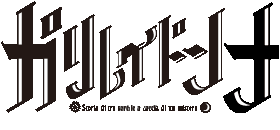

ガリレイドンナ (Garireidonna)
- Genre: Action, Adventure, Sci-fi, Romance
- Created by: Yasuomi Umetsu; TeamGD
- Anime television series
- Directed by: Yasuomi Umetsu
- Produced by: Makoto Kimura; Takamitsu Inoue
- Written by: Atsushi Oka; Hideyuki Kurata; Jun Kumagai; Touko Machida
- Music by: Shirō Hamaguchi
- Studio: A-1 Pictures
- Licensed by: NA: Discotek Media
- Original network: Fuji TV (Noitamina)
- Original run: October 10, 2013 – December 19, 2013
- Episodes: 11

Galilei Donna: Storia di tre sorelle a caccia di un mistero (ガリレイドンナ, Garirei donna; lit. Galilei Donna: Story of three sisters in search of a mystery) is an original anime television series created by Yasuomi Umetsu and produced by Fuji TV, Aniplex, Kyoraku, Dentsu, and A-1 Pictures. It is directed by Umetsu, with Shingo Adachi as a character designer, Niθ as a mechanical designer, and Shirō Hamaguchi composing the music. Episode 1 was previewed at a screening in Tokyo on October 5, 2013. Regular broadcasting began on October 10, 2013.

== Plot ==
Galilei Donna, set in 2061, is the story of the three Ferrari sisters—Hozuki, Kazuki, and Hazuki—descendants of Galileo Galilei who have completely different personalities and thus are constantly at odds with each other, until they are falsely accused of terrorism as part of a conspiracy involving an ancient treasure said to be left behind by Galileo. As the only way to clear their names is to beat their enemies to the treasure, the Ferrari sisters follow the clues left by their ancestor and embark on a journey around the world to unveil its secrets.

== Characters ==
=== Ferrari family ===
Hozuki Ferrari (星月・フェラーリ, Hozuki Ferāri)
Voiced by: Rina Hidaka
The 13-year-old youngest Ferrari sister, junior high school student and one of the four descendants of Galileo Galilei, she is known for being somewhat flighty. Even if she tries something she doesn't keep at it for very long, due to her lack of confidence. Science is her only strong point that she inherited from her ancestor Galileo and parents. She has a big interest in Japanese culture and food, and is constantly seen eating Japanese confection. She is reserved and quiet, but in truth she is most likely to take action first of the three sisters and stand up for her own rights. Even though not shown in the beginning and her comment about her family being in pieces, she is actually very protective of her siblings and parents. By finding the drawings left by Galileo, she gradually started wandering what love would feel like, since the things written on the drawings were love letters. Later on her trip to the past and the few days spent there, she gradually fell in love with the young Galileo. And later realizing that the feelings they both shared were mutual by finding the seventh drawing. She has a fondness for goldfishes as she owns a pet goldfish and will build machines with the same appearance, referred to by most people as being weird.
Kazuki Ferrari (神月・フェラーリ, Kazuki Ferāri)
Voiced by: Rumi Ōkubo
The 17-year-old middle Ferrari sister, a high school student, and one of the four descendants of Galileo Galilei. She is the cool type who tries not to show her emotions, but is in fact the most sensitive in the family. She is quite timid and prone to worrying. She has strong physical abilities and is very skilled at Shorinji Kempo. She is also very skilled at cooking, and sometimes makes fun of Hazuki due to her lack in cooking. Early on when she found out about her sisters Hozuki`s ability, she felt jealous and useless that she was the only one in the family that couldn't understand and do anything, but later on accepted Hozuki`s talent. She seems to have a crush on a classmate of hers in school, but nothing more than his picture on her mobile phone is revealed in the series, she is always looking at her phone of his picture and didn't want to throw away her phone when her sisters handed out walkies-talkies due to the possibility of the enemy tracking them, although he is shown in the court room in the last episode as a witness to the indiction of the Ferrari sisters.
Hazuki Ferrari (葉月・フェラーリ, Hazuki Ferāri)
Voiced by: Kei Shindō
The 20-year-old eldest Ferrari sister. She is very frank, that it immediately shows up on her face and says whatever she is thinking. She is a college student living on her own studying law in hope to become a prosecutor one day, even though her grades are quite low. She is also one of the four descendants of Galileo Galilei. She has a tendency to drink and will often behave wildly. She has an amazing verbal attack power, but has very strong feelings of wanting to protect her sisters. Whenever she thinks or knows something that is against the law of justice and or court, she will go wild and start to talk all about it. As seen in episode five, she argues about that stealing is still stealing and there shouldn't be any of those going on just for being against Adni Moon. Due to her standing up to the leader of Black Ganymede, it seems that he has taken a liking to her and so has given her the nickname "Bambina" (Italian for "child"). Together they have been referred to as oil and water, but later on she became quite dependent on him, as she wanted his help and strength to protect her sisters.
Sylvia Ferrari (シルヴィア・フェラーリ, Shiruvia Ferāri)
Voiced by: Houko Kuwashima
She is the 43-year-old divorced mother of the Ferrari sisters. She is an engineer and the original descendant of Galileo Galilei. Sylvia is very proud of her heritage and tries to get Hazuki, Kazuki, and Hozuki to feel the same way, but her efforts seem to have the opposite effect on the three girls. At the end of the series she is shown with her husband together again taking a trip with the family to Japan.
Geshio Ferrari (夏至生・フェラーリ, Geshio Ferāri)
Voiced by: Rikiya Koyama
The father of the 3 sisters. Japanese who speaks in Kansai dialect. Currently is estranged with his wife Sylvia. He is also an aviation and space engineer, and is a professor at a university. His father is currently living in Kyoto, Japan. At the end of the series he is shown with his wife and family together again taking a trip to Japan.

=== Others ===
Cicinho (シシーニョ, Shishīnyo)
Voiced by: Hiroshi Kamiya
The young leader of the air pirate troupe called Black Ganymede. As the charismatic boss of an outlaw group that is the subject of an international police search. He has a sharp mind, strong physical abilities, and is a good man, he described himself as having no weakness since the two things italian men are weak against are good food and women. His crew is made up of people he saved as children from an abusive orphanage and has gained their trust and friendship. He seems to have a crush on Hazuki, who he calls "Bambina" (Italian for "child"). And has been referred to as a stalker due to following her all the time. He is quite cruel when facing an opponent but has shown kindness and respect numerous times when the sisters were not capable of fighting back. He even lent a helping hand when Hazuki was sick, and has also proposed that he will protect her, where she smiled and gladly accepted his help, making him surprised and blush, not knowing she would answer immediately. Before leaving he promised that next time he will be taking her and the Galileo Tesoro with him.
Anna Hendrix (アンナ・ヘンドリックス, Anna Hendorikkusu)
Voiced by: Marina Inoue
A publishing editor. She is enchanted by the things Galileo Galilei left behind and chases after the unsolved puzzles left behind. She is a self-proclaimed Galileo Maniac, and her extensive knowledge about Galileo is of great assistance to the sisters as she travels with them in Hozuki's ship, which she christened with the name "The Galileo." She is actually a spy working for Messier who was entrusted with the task of helping the sisters find Galileo's sketches and later on disposing of them by the order of Roberto. Due to her strong feelings for Roberto it was hard neglecting his orders. However, she had become greatly attached to the sisters during the search that she turns against Roberto when he tries to kill the sisters.
Roberto Materazzi (ロベルト・マテラッツィ, Roberuto Materattsui)
Voiced by: Taiten Kusunoki
The adopted son of the chief executive of the world-famous Adnimoon Company and the main antagonist. His birth parents, presented as wealthy but kind and charitable, to the point that they gave their son's birthday feast to some local beggars, they were killed in an unexplained air attack on his city. When he asked the beggars to help his trapped father they stole a diamond pendant from the corpse of his mother, and knocked him into the path of a falling wall, crushing his left leg and right arm. He is a cruel person who does not care about others. All that matters to him is prevailing justice on the people who are ungrateful, as he did in the hospital when the Black Ganymede had captured him.
Theo Escher ((テオ・エッシャー), Teo Esshā)
Voiced by: Daiki Yamashita
He and Hozuki Ferrari both share the same hobby and are interested in Galileo's moon sketches and learnings. He is an eager boy who is plans things through. He also seems to care about people without knowing how to show them, but is actually really friendly. He also has a crush on Karen his childhood friend, and has even made a telescope as a present to give her. His dream was to start school next year.
Karen (カレン)
Voiced by: Nao Toyama
She is quiet and seems to have a hard time speaking her thoughts out. Theo is her childhood friend. She has feelings for him, though it seems a little bit hard for her to say it. She might have been a little envious about Hozuki. However, she has a positive attitude toward her because she is glad there would be somebody to understand Theo and his sayings.
Hans Herman (ヘルマン・ハンス, Heruman Hansu)
Voiced by: Kenji Hamada
Hans is very good man who created the Micro-Doctor, a medical robot to heal his daughter for a surgical disease. He lives by himself in a park and is very poor, as described by the sisters he smells kind of bad. He is also generous to Hozuki, Hazuki, Kazuki, and Anna as they gave him food, as he was almost going to starve. He also helped Hozuki recover from her sickness with the Micro-Doctor.
Grande Rosso (グランデ・ロッソ, Gurande Rosso)
Voiced by: Misaki Kuno
The AI created by Hozuki for the airship Galileo. Grande Rosso is based on Picco Rosso, an artificial goldfish that Hozuki made, but due to the loss of her home, Picco Rosso was brought onto the airship with Hozuki while travelling, but upon Hozuki going back in time Picco Rosso is given to Galileo as a present before they departed ways. Grande Rosso can be activated when someone reads the manual using the voice recognition technique.
Galileo Galilei (ガリレオ・ガリレイ, Garireo Garirei)
Voiced by: Yuki Kaji
The astronomer who is the ancestor of the Ferrari sisters. Hozuki is thrown into the past to meet him when the Galileo Tesoro activates. Galileo ends up falling in love with Hozuki while she's thrown back into the past, but unable to tell his feelings for her after she left, he decided to write his feelings and experiences with her on the moon sketches. Hence the love letters. Hoping she would find them in the future. It is shown that he too has a liking to the confetti that Hozuki likes to eat.

== Media ==
=== Anime ===
The anime began airing on October 10, 2013, in the noitamina block on Fuji TV. The series' opening theme is "Synchromanica" by Negoto and its ending theme is "Innocent" by earthmind. The anime is licensed by Crunchyroll with distribution by Discotek Media, and they've released the series on DVD July 28, 2015.

==== Episode list ====
| No. | Title | Directed by | Written by | Original release date |
|---|---|---|---|---|
| 1 | "Galileo DNA"; Transliteration: "Garireo DNA" (Japanese: ガリレオDNA) | Yasuomi Umetsu | Hideyuki Kurata | October 10, 2013 |
The Ferrari sisters Hozuki, Kazuki, and Hazuki are attacked by unknown individuals. The Ferrari family is brought together in Tuscany as a result of these attacks. Although the Italian police have no idea why they would become targets, they decide the situation demands that they have a close watch on the Ferrari family home, since the three sisters live separately. Cicinho and his sky pirate troupe Black Ganymede attack the Ferrari household and threaten everyone except for Hozuki as he holds Hazuki at gunpoint with an unloaded handgun demanding that they hand Galileo's inheritance to them. Cicinho's plan is foiled when Hozuki sneaks into the basement unnoticed and launches her goldfish-looking airship that she secretly built, taking down the Black Ganymede.
| 2 | "Messier"; Transliteration: "Meshe" (Japanese: メシェ) | Hidetoshi Takahashi | Hideyuki Kurata | October 17, 2013 |
Hozuki's family were amazed by the airship that she made and asked how she made it. Hozuki told them about the blueprint she found in the attic and use it to make the airship for 3 years so that she could use it to go to Japan, the country their father Geshio lives. The police came and captured the Ferrari family except for Hozuki, who went to rescue her pet goldfish. Hozuki meets up with Anna, who is a Galileo enthusiast who does not want the inheritance, Galileo Tesoro, to fall into the wrong hands. Anna informed Hozuki that her family is in danger and that she is the only one who could save them. After much thinking, Hozuki plans to save her family, hoping that their broken family will get together again. At the prison, Sylvia was bailed by her former employer, Francesco Materazzi, the CEO of Adnimoon, to ask her the whereabouts of Galileo Tesoro. Roberto also interrogates the rest of the Ferraris. Being pursued by the police, Anna disguises herself as Hozuki to draw the police away from her. Hozuki uses this distraction to rescue her family using a goldfish mecha. During the escape, Geshio stays behind piloting the mecha to allow the sisters to escape into Hozuki's airship, Galileo, as he leaves the task of finding the Galileo Tesoro to the sisters before anyone finds it. Meanwhile, Sylvia is found shot in the head.
| 3 | "Goldfish Life"; Transliteration: "Kingyo raifu" (Japanese: キンギョ・ライフ) | Takehiro Miura | Jun Kumagai | October 24, 2013 |
Geshio and Sylvia are alive, but Sylvia has amnesia and is in custody of Adnimoon who plans to take advantage of Sylvia's amnesia since her talents are not affected by her amnesia. On board the airship built by Hozuki named the Galileo, Hazuki learns that the attackers are Messier, an organization that does Adnimoon's dirty work, where Roberto, the son of the CEO of Adnimoon, is its leader. Wandering around the ship, Kazuki breaks down, feeling the jealousy of her younger sister's talent and also because of the burden of the family blood she carries. Kazuki thinks that Hozuki gives important to her mission than them. The sisters plan to resupply food in the nearby town. They ask the ship's goldfish AI, Grande Rosso, to find a landing point. But the AI said that they cannot find a town to land. Because of that, the sisters learn that they are wanted fugitives by the Italian police. Then they are attacked by Roberto, demanding that they hand over Galileo Tesoro. Anna finds one of Galileo's sketches in the ship and Kazuki wants to hand it to Roberto to gain their safety and return home. However, Hazuki and Hozuki convince her not to since they have already gone too far for their pursuers to just leave them and that it is still their duty to protect their ancestor's treasure. The sisters are saved by Cicinho, who attacks Roberto's airship allowing the sisters to escape. Hozuki examines the sketch and figures out that the next clue deals with music.
| 4 | "Snow Gift"; Transliteration: "Sunōgifuto" (Japanese: スノーギフト) | Takao Abo | Atsushi Oka | October 31, 2013 |
The clue leads the sisters to a park somewhere in Germany for the next sketch, as well as an opportunity to resupply. Upon arriving in Germany, while the sisters are looking for the sketch, a homeless strange man named Herman Hans asks the sisters to help him. The sisters offer Hans some food. Hans is reminded Hozuki of his daughter who is also fond of machines and started telling stories about her. The sisters learn that he is a doctor who created a micro doctor medical gadget, which is thought to be incomplete and a failure, in a failed attempt to cure his daughter of a disease that claimed her life. Hazuki and Hozuki go shopping and are pursued by the Black Ganymede. During the pursuit, Hozuki injures herself after falling from the balcony of a building, trying to escape their pursuers. Since they are wanted fugitives, they can't take Hozuki in a hospital and instead Hazuki carried Hozuki back in the ship. Recalling that Hans created the micro doctor, Kazuki ask Hans to help Hozuki. With the pirates still in pursuit, Kazuki quickly learns how to pilot the Galileo. While Hans can't perform surgery in their situation, Hazuki persuades Cicinho to not attack the Galileo because Hozuki's life is in danger. Cicinho is clueless of what she is talking about and keeps on pursuing them but later Cicinho retreats due to his code of honor when he confirms what really happened from his crew. Following the attack, Hozuki recovers. Hans thanked them for letting him help Hozuki and gave them the sketch of the moon, which Hans had been using as a placemat after he found it in a broken goldfish statue at the park when he started living there. Back in the ship, Kazuki went looking for Hozuki and started accepting Hozuki and her works.
| 5 | "Constellation Dreams"; Transliteration: "Seiza mugen" (Japanese: 星座夢幻) | Shigeki Kawai | Tōko Machida | November 7, 2013 |
The next clue leads the Anna and the sisters to a ghost town somewhere in Netherlands where the Blue Hawks, a band of thieves led by Ludger Verhoeven, are hiding. They initially act hostile with the Anna and the sisters, pointing their guns at them while interrogating them, until Hazuki lectured them about lawbreaking and eventually, the Blue Hawks welcomed them as fellow fugitives. The Blue Hawks led them in their hideout at a worn out cathedral and offered them foods and drinks. While Anna and Kazuki went to look for the sketch, Hozuki meets up with Theo Escher, a boy around her age from the Blue Hawks aspiring to become an inventor. Theo has taken an interest to the sisters' ship and asked Hozuki to take him inside to look around. At night, Theo shows Hazuki a telescope that he built to give to Karen, his childhood friend, while they both talk about Galileo and their interests. The next day, Hozuki and Karen had a conversation. Karen told Hozuki that she is jealous of her because Hozuki can relate to Theo's interests while she can't and Theo calls her stupid for it, making her think that Theo doesn't like her. Hozuki told her that is not true and that Theo might give her something special on her birthday. Karen is surprised that Hozuki guessed her birthday and cheered up. After parting with Karen, Hozuki went with Theo to look for the sketch inside the cathedral. Inside the cathedral, Hozuki saw a stained glass that depicts a goldfish. They followed the sunlight that comes from it and saw a gold fish mark on the floor that leads them under the cathedral, finding the sketch. After that, Theo is excited to show it to Ludger. Worried that the Blue Hawks might take the sketch, Hozuki told Theo that she is a descendant of Galileo and that she and her sisters are on a journey to find the sketches of the moon. Theo told her that it is okay for him that Hozuki and her sisters take the sketch. Furthermore, he added that even if they showed the sketch to Ludger, Ludger will let them take it as well. However, upon meeting Ludger, they find out that Ludger sells out the band to Adnimoon in order to escape, and warns Theo and Hozuki that the village is about to be bombed. Instead of escaping, Theo goes back to the hideout to get Karen, who became too injured to walk in the attack retrieving the telescope. Hozuki attempts to rescue the Blue Hawks, but her request gets overridden by Grand Rosso, telling her that its dangerous and they might get bombed as well. The Galileo escapes moments before the hideout was bombed, killing the members of the Blue Hawks.
| 6 | "Galileo Tesoro"; Transliteration: "Garireotezoro" (Japanese: ガリレオテゾロ) | Yūki Itō | Jun Kumagai | November 14, 2013 |
Roberto reminisce his past. During his 11th birthday, his father and mother celebrated his birthday by having a fancy dinner at their mansion. Outside their mansion, two poor men are begging for something to eat. Roberto's father has given the 2 men all the foods they have in their dinner table, saving a piece of cake for Roberto. His father apologized to him and said that in this world, people are born with equal rights where the rich should share his wealth to those who are in need. Robert understood what his father meant and split his piece of cake into three to share it to his parents. However, the next morning, his house was destroyed in an air raid. His mother immediately died however his father is still alive but his lower half is buried in debris and can't get out. Wanted to save his father, Roberto shouted asking for help. The two poor men from yesterday heard him and went to check them. Instead of helping Roberto's father, they stole Roberto's mother's expensive necklace and left them. Another bomb explodes leading to his father's death and Roberto being buried in debris. Roberto survived and was taken to a hospital although his left hand and right leg got amputated. At the hospital, Francesco visited the victims. After he saw Roberto, he has taken a liking to him, and decided to adopt him. After that, Roberto's personality has changed and he becomes ruthless. Back in the present, Hazuki had a fever and Anna and the sisters stop at a hospital in Russia for treatment. There, they encounter the crew of the Black Ganymede, who has taken over the hospital. Moments later, Roberto appeared and attacks the crew, wanted to take over the hospital to repair the engine of his airship by using the parts from the hospital's airship, which coincidentally the same with the Black Ganymede. Cicinho and his other crew appeared pointing a gun at Roberto, saving the sisters and the others. After all the commotion, Hozuki and Kazuki continue to look for medicine. Cicinho ordered two of his crew to help them upon learning from Anna that Hazuki has a fever. After finding the medicine, the power generator has gone down and they are trapped at the basement. The 2 pirates helped them to find a way out while telling Hozuki how grateful they are to Cicinho for giving them freedom and a reason to live after he saved them from the people at the orphanage who are hurting them and the other children. Furthermore, after they followed him, more people came to join them and they finally established their group and started stealing from others because they don't have a choice. After hearing their story, Hozuki feels bad and can't accept the fact that the world is giving them freedom only to find that you don't have a choice. While people are fighting over how the limited resources of the hospital should be allocated, Roberto took a hostage and goes on a massacre, killing the pirates. He told them that the human population has become too many and the world doesn't have enough resources for everyone and it is him that will balance the scale by eliminating those who are foul and greedy. Hozuki intervenes, causing an explosion that leaves the hospital exposed to the frigid air and causing her hourglass pendant to activate to break up the fight. After that, Hozuki, Kazuki, and Anna have found a chance to escape and immediately returned to their ship. Hazuki is given some medicine from the hospital and recovers from her illness. Meanwhile, Roberto was about to kill Cicinho and a few remaining pirates, but runs out of bullets. He went on the rooftop of the hospital and said to himself that he had found Galileo Tesoro, which is Hozuki's hourglass pendant.
| 7 | "Salt Fish"; Transliteration: "Sorutofisshu" (Japanese: ソルトフィッシュ) | Ippei Yokota | Jun Kumagai | November 21, 2013 |
After what happened at the hospital in Russia, the sisters deduce that the hourglass pendant is the Galileo Tesoro that Adnimoon is after. They also figure out that Anna has known about the Galileo Tesoro and has connections to Adnimoon. However she disagrees with Roberto over the way the Galileo Tesoro should be used as the Adnimoon plans to monopolize the Galileo Tesoro and use it as a new energy source. Now that the sisters knew what the Adnimoon wants with them, they were burdened to carry the faith of the world in their hands but that doesn't stop the sisters because they never want the Galileo Tesoro to fall in the wrong hands and be use in the wrong way. After that Hozuki and Anna had a conversation. Hozuki told Anna that even though she knew about the importance of the Galileo Tesoro in saving the world, she still holds finding the sketches as a priority, and feels bad about herself. Anna told her that it's just normal for everyone to have different priorities and that hers is about love. Anna told Hozuki about her one-sided love on a man who never noticed her but still wanted to help the man. After Hozuki read the writings in the previous sketch, the next clue sends them to the Caspian Sea with Adnimoon hot on their trail. While Hozuki talks about her love of Japanese culture to a Kansai accent Grande Rosso, they got attacked by Roberto and the Adnimoon. Unable to engage in underwater combat, the Galileo is forced to surface. With the Adnimoon surrounding them, Anna and the sisters are immobilized when the Galileo is badly damaged by Roberto. Outside the Galileo, Anna and the sisters confront Roberto hoping to take him as a hostage and escape as they dare him to take the pendant. However, Roberto knew about their plan and got Hazuki beaten up. In order to save their lives, Kazuki surrenders the pendant to Roberto. Upon taking the pendant, Roberto and the Adnimoon left. Despite having lost the Gailieo Tesoro, the sisters never lose hope and continue their search for the sketches which will eventually help them lead to the Galileo Tesoro. Upon finding the next sketch hidden inside a nearby stone monument, the next clue leads them to Japan.
| 8 | "Giappone"; Transliteration: "Jappōne" (Japanese: ジャッポーネ) | Shunsuke Machitani | Atsushi Oka | November 28, 2013 |
Before looking for the sketch, the sisters visit their grandfather in Kyoto. During their visit, their grandfather is surprised to see her granddaughters. This is the first time Hozuki and Kazuki meeting their grandfather while Hazuki met him once when she was little during her trip to Japan with Geshio and Sylvia. Their grandfather wonders how Geshio and Sylvia doing. The sisters didn't want to know the situation they were in right now so they told him that they are fine. After their grandfather heard about their journey from Anna, he is thankful for the help Anna has done for the sisters and asked them to stay for the night. After that the sister's went to their father's room with Hazuki hoping to find something suspicious in his room. In there, the sisters found a photo album under Geshio's bed where they learn about his past and how he met their mom. They also found a sketch of an energy converter that Geshio drew to build for their grandfather. Near the house, the sister saw Geshio's broken down energy converter and Hozuki goes off to fix up the energy converter. Meanwhile, Anna gets a call from Roberto and is displeased to learn that Roberto plans to kill the sisters once the remaining sketches have been found. During their free time, Anna and the sisters go on a sightseeing trip around Kyoto. Hazuki splits up from the group and runs into Cicinho who is worried for her after he heard what happened with her and her sisters during their encounter with Messier at the Caspian Sea. Wanted to protect Hazuki, Cicinho asked her to come with him in the Black Ganymede. Hazuki accepted his request immediately, to Cicinho's surprise. Hazuki admits to Cicinho that her ideal of justice is flawed, but Cicinho tells her that she needs power to uphold her justice and that a power shouldn't be given to those who don't uphold any ideals. Furthermore, he told Hazuki that she didn't have to change and she has to stay true to herself. Realizing that Cicinho is a better man than she thought, Hazuki laughs at how serious Cicinho is and thanks him for cheering her up. Hozuki, Kazuki, and Anna went up to meet Hazuki, Cicinho changing his mind and leaves, telling Hazuki that he will be taking her and the sketches next time. After they return to their grandfather's house for dinner, Hozuki activates the energy converter which prompts their grandfather to use the heater in the house because the energy converter converts the energy he is using in the house in order to conserve energy. While she worries about what Roberto said to her, Anna saw how the sisters are growing more attached to her as they even join her during her bath time and thanking her for the help she did for them. Because of that, Anna continues to question her loyalty to Roberto. On the next day, Anna and the sisters resume their search for the sketch. They found the sketch at the grave of Yagyū Munenori in Nara.
| 9 | "Space-Time Goldfish (Part One)"; Transliteration: "Jikū kingyo zenpen" (Japanese: 時空金魚＜前編＞) | Takehiro Miura; Kenichi Kubara | Tōko Machida | December 5, 2013 |
At the Libyan Desert, the sisters find the sixth and final sketch along with a telescope. Anna informs Roberto about the completion of the sketch. Meanwhile at the ship, Hozuki is starting to get suspicious of Anna, being told by Anna that there are seven sketches before and that she is hiding something from them. After a while, Grande Rosso informed them of an incoming enemy. They found out that it is Roberto and the Messier. However, the Galileo's fuel is depleted and they are unable to escape. Roberto demands the sisters to surrender all the sketches along with the real Galileo Tesoro, claiming that the one he had obtained from them was a fake. Roberto informs them that their actions will be useless to him because they don't have any experience in battle which is something that can't be learned from any books and that he will give it to them if he were in their place. Anna tries to convince the sisters to do as he says hoping Roberto to leave the sisters. While on it, Anna reveals herself to be working under Roberto and that she was the one who emptied the Galileo's fuel tank. Roberto then asked Anna to shoot the sisters. However, when the Black Ganymede appears to rescue the girls, Anna betrays Roberto and reveals that the fuel was not thrown away, but stored inside the ship's engine room and urges the sisters to escape. However, both the pirates and the sisters are about to be killed when Hozuki activates the real Galileo Tesoro and time slows down around her, before she is thrown into the past centuries before, where she has an encounter with a youngster, who is in fact her ancestor Galileo Galilei himself. After having his prototype flying machine destroyed by accident, Galilei realizes that Hozuki has fallen from the same kind of storm and shows her some other strange objects that fell from it. Hozuki then figures that those items were sucked by the Galileo Tesoro when she activated it in Russia. After Galilei reveals that the storm occurs in regular intervals, he and Hozuki join forces to create an airplane in time for the next storm and return her to her proper time.
| 10 | "Space-Time Goldfish (Part Two)"; Transliteration: "Jikū kingyo kōhen" (Japanese: 時空金魚＜後編＞) | Kazuhiro Yamada | Tōko Machida | December 12, 2013 |
Galilei and Hozuki tested some toy planes that have designs that could help them fly. After finding the proper design, they put the finishing touches on their plane. At night, Hozuki went to see Galilei, who is looking up to the moon and the stars using a telescope that he made. Then Galilei started drawing sketches of the moon while telling Hozuki that he doesn't believe in Geocentrism which is an accepted theory in his time and that he needs enough proof to explain it to the people. Galileo realizes that Hozuki is from the future and learns the harsh situation the world will be in the next centuries. Then they ate confeito, which is Hozuki's favourite sweet. After their conversation, Hozuki wonders to who and when Galilei will write the scripts in the sketches. In the next day, before flying their plane, Hozuki gave Galilei her Picco Rosso for helping her return to her time. Then the duo successfully flies with their plane in time to reach the storm. On their way to the storm, Hozuki hears from Galileo about people not understanding him and thinks that he is crazy which made him kept his ideas to himself and becomes alone until he met Hozuki. Furthermore, Galileo tells her how their encounter was important to him and that despite how much he cares for her, he is determined to send her back to the future to help her family. Hozuki then realizes that Galileo is in love with her and the letter he wrote on the sketches is to none other than herself. After Hozuki returns to her proper time, the Ferrari sisters are protected by the Black Ganymede who helps them to flee, but their escape is cut short when their ship is shot down by the Interpol who demands them to surrender.
| 11 | "Galileo Judge"; Transliteration: "Garireojajji" (Japanese: ガリレオジャッジ) | Takao Abo | Jun Kumagai | December 19, 2013 |
The sisters are brought back to Tuscany in preparation for their trial. Francesco, the CEO of Adnimoon, went to see them and told them that he will clear his charges on them if they told them the location of Galileo Tesoro. The sisters refused his offer and Francesco has left them no choice. Their lawyer, a frail old man, gives the sisters the sketches and the pendant claiming that some woman found them. Back at their cell, Hozuki tries to find more clues in the sketches by using the Galileo Tesoro but to no avail as it only contains words Galileo Galilei left for Hozuki. Hazuki asked Hozuki when did she planned to move the Galileo Tesoro to Picco Rosso. Hozuki told her that it was during their stay at Germany when Grande Rosso informed her of Anna's suspicious actions at that time and that Hozuki only took action after the Galileo Tesoro activates at the hospital in Russia. At the trial, Adnimoon presents their case for convicting the sisters for their crimes of hiding the Galileo Tesoro, building weapons of mass destruction, and causing large-scale damage. Hazuki counters with evidence that Adnimoon was secretly building weapons themselves, but the evidence is dismissed after Adnimoon argues that it has no relevance to the case. Adnimoon brings in their final witness, Sylvia, who condemns the sisters and blames herself for being a poor mother. However, Geshio shows up and Sylvia presents damning evidence against Adnimoon to the judge, telling everybody that she faked her amnesia to learn Adnimoon's secrets. Adnimoon is convicted, and Francesco is shot by Roberto. After finding the answer using a hint, Hozuki examines the sketches using the telescope they found with the last sketch and learns how to produce the Galileo Tesoro from them. Anna shows up telling everyone that she found the sketches and the pendant, and the lawyer reveals himself as Cicinho, who takes the pendant and flees. The sisters search for the seventh sketch despite not knowing whether or not it exists, and they find it inside the globe at the ruins of their home. The sketch contains Galileo's drawing of Hozuki. Hozuki realized that everything she made so far is based on Galileo's sketches in the attic. Aboard the Galileo, the Ferrari family heads to Japan to meet up with the sisters' grandfather to complete the Galileo Tesoro that Galilei has left Hozuki to complete.
