= Mezzo DSA =

Japanese anime television series

メゾ DSA (Mezo Dī Esu Ē)
- Anime television series
- Directed by: Yasuomi Umetsu
- Produced by: Mariko Kusuhara; Osamu Koshinaka; Satoshi Matsui; Tsuyoshi Yoshida
- Written by: Takao Yoshioka
- Music by: Fumika Yasuda
- Studio: ARMS
- Licensed by: AUS: Madman Entertainment; NA: Sentai Filmworks; UK: ADV Films (former)
- Original network: TV Kanagawa
- English network: UK: Rapture TV; US: Anime Network
- Original run: 4 January 2004 – 30 March 2004
- Episodes: 13
- Manga

Mezzo
- Written by: Yasuomi Umetsu
- Published by: Ohzora Comic Creation
- Published: April 24, 2004
- Volumes: 1

Mezzo DSA is a 13-episode anime series created by Yasuomi Umetsu and the first not to be licensed by Anime Works, but instead licensed by ADV Films. It is a follow-up to the 2001 OVA Mezzo Forte.

== Synopsis ==
Mikura, Kurokawa, and Harada are the three members of the Danger Service Agency (DSA). Mikura is the brawn of the group, Harada is the brains, and Kurokawa is just a bitter ex-cop who likes to think he's in charge. They'll take on any job as long as it involves much danger and, of course, money. Their biggest case, however, could prove to be finding out why someone wants Kurokawa assassinated.

The DSA's headquarters is an old red British double-decker bus that has been converted into living quarters for the three main characters. It has been placed on the rooftop of a two-story building which houses Mugiyama's barber shop on the ground floor. They drive an old-style pink Volkswagen Beetle.

== Characters ==
=== Major characters ===
Tomohisa Harada, Mikura Suzuki, and Kenichi Kurokawa

The series concerns three characters who comprise the Danger Service Agency (D.S.A.), as well as a young acquaintance of theirs. The main characters include:

Mikura Suzuki (鈴木 海空来, Suzuki Mikura)
Voiced by: Tomoko Kotani (Japanese); Luci Christian (English)
The team's combat specialist who enjoys shooting first and asking questions later. Mikura is strong, highly proficient at fighting and using firearms, her preferred weapon being the Colt M1911A1 semi-automatic pistol. She also has a limited yet uncontrollable precognitive ability which enables her to see brief glimpses of the future. She is determined, strong willed and can be a cold blooded killer if the situation requires her to be one. She is very competitive and unsociable, but she has a kind soul deep down. She also has a love of karaoke.
Kenichi Kurokawa (黒川 健一, Kurokawa Ken'ichi)
Voiced by: Taichirō Hirokawa (Japanese); Andy McAvin (English)
The team's leader who is an ex-cop and loves eating noodles of any kind. He is partners with Mikura and Harada in the DSA, or Danger Service Agency (often referred to as the "Risk Their Lives Trio" in the press). He drives a pink Volkswagen Beetle, howls at hot women and always cracks lame puns. Mikura and Harada refer to Kurokawa as "Pops" for short. He likes to think that he is in charge, and more often than not, he arranges jobs for the DSA. His knowledge in underworld dealings is valuable to the team. He is also blackmailing his old chief for ammunition for Mikura by holding a DVD showing the chief in a compromising situation with an underaged pop star, and Kurokawa is now hunted by an assassin sent by Black Scissors. He is half Japanese and half American.
Tomohisa Harada (原田 智久, Harada Tomohisa)
Voiced by: Takumi Yamazaki (Japanese); Jason Douglas (English)
Member of the Danger Service Agency, he's a pointy-haired young man who is infatuated with Mikura, but won't admit it to himself or others. He is an expert on Gynoids, Androids, and all things technical.
Asami Igarashi (五十嵐 あさみ, Igarashi Asami)
Voiced by: Miyu Matsuki (Japanese); Sasha Paysinger (English)
A schoolgirl who is rescued by Mikura in the first episode and becomes part of the D.S.A. She is often picked on by her classmates who bully her for money. When she doesn't have as much money as they would like, they say very hurtful comments to her and push her around. Therefore she is shy and quiet. She wants to one day become a strong woman like Mikura. She witnesses Mikura at work and begins hanging around the DSA's headquarters (much to Kurokawa's dismay).
Chiyoki Mugiyama (麦山 千代奇, Mugiyama Chiyoki)
Voiced by: Yūichi Nagashima (Japanese); Vic Mignogna (English)
He is a barber. He seems sadistic, and likes to give people 'the trim' if something goes wrong. He is often the source of information for the D.S.A. However, he is also the leader of Black Scissors, a mercenary black market group who has been contracted by Kurokawa's old police captain to kill Kurokawa (mostly because Kurokawa is holding a DVD with embarrassing pictures about the captain in order to obtain ammunition).

=== Minor characters ===
There is also a selection of minor characters in the series, some of which even have major significance with the major ones.

Sakura Sakurada (桜田 桜, Sakurada Sakura)
Voiced by: Miki Nagasawa (Japanese); Monica Rial (English)
She was at one time Mikura's best friend, both children of the streets. She and Mikura would survive by stealing for their food, until they got separated when Mikura ran interference against then-detective Kurokawa. Sakura's life afterward went on a downward spiral, trying to achieve the same. Then one night as she was about to be raped by three men, she was rescued by Momomi Momoi (桃井 桃実, Momoi Momomi), a character introduced in the original OVA as the psychotic daughter of antagonist Momokichi Momoi (桃井 桃吉, Momoi Momokichi) who singlehandedly killed the rapists. Since then, Sakura and Momomi became lesbian lovers, and Momomi had taught Sakura how to fight and defend herself. Sakura often described Momomi as beautiful as she is terrifying. Sakura was deeply in love with Momomi, so when she found out that Momomi was killed by Mikura, she set out to get revenge by killing Mikura. However, many of her early attempts were unsuccessful because Kurokawa and Harada, who were on an unrelated case, interfered. When she finally did make an attempt on Mikura's life, she ended up accidentally stabbing herself. As Sakura was dying, she had told Mikura that she found out that Momomi and Mikura were actually half-sisters (this was hinted at in Mezzo Forte). As she was about to die, a Gynoid (who was about to self-destruct, again from Kurokawa and Harada's case) came crashing out of a window. Hallucinating from her wounds, Sakura thought it was Momomi coming to embrace her. Sakura died when the Gynoid blew up.
Manon Asakura (朝倉 麻否, Asakura Manon)
Voiced by: Junko Noda (Japanese); Tiffany Grant (English)
She was an old classmate of Harada's. Harada had a crush on her, but since she was a daughter of Asakura Industries, he saw little chance of even saying hello to her. There was a time, however, when Manon talked to him, though she always insisted that they leave at a specific time. One day, Manon insisted upon staying with Harada longer. They spent the day on a Ferris wheel, but after they got off, Manon collapsed and gave instructions to be returned to her father's company. When Harada complied, he learned the horrifying truth that the "Manon" he went out with was actually a Gynoid, which was constructed by Manon and her father to test new theories in artificial intelligence interactions with normal humans. In a combination of grief and rage, Harada destroyed the lab and was later arrested by Kurokawa (who was still a police detective at the time). But Harada kept the program chip with the Gynoid Manon's programming. Years later, the true Manon inherited her father's company, and in a chance encounter was reunited with Harada and asked him if he would join the company, hoping he would be a help in their AI division. He kindly refused.
Kazuto (魚眼の和外, Gyogan no Kazuto) (aka "Fish-eye Kazuto")
Voiced by: Issei Miyazaki (Japanese); Chris Patton (English)
He is a young assassin assigned by Mugiyama to kill Kurokawa. However, he hadn't had any luck, either by circumstance, or Mikura's interference. He is fascinated by Mikura, however, and often thinks about her.

== Manga ==
A manga adaptation (which had the full title, Mezzo Danger Service Agency) which covered all 13 episodes in 1 tankobõn volume, was released in April 2004, a month after the anime ended. It has currently not been licensed or translated by any American company.

== Anime ==
The opening theme is "「スキマミマイタイ」 Suki Mami Mai Tai" by Barnabys (Shoko, Ai & Miyo) while the ending theme is 蜜 (Mitsu, lit. Honey) by Barnabys.

No.	Title	Original release date
1	"Shell of Love"; Transliteration: "koi no kara" (Japanese: 恋の殻)	January 4, 2004
2	"Shell of Stars"; Transliteration: "boshi no kara" (Japanese: 星の殻)	January 11, 2004
3	"Shell of Fear"; Transliteration: "osore no kara" (Japanese: 恐の殻)	January 18, 2004
4	"Shell of Lies, Posi"; Transliteration: "uso no kara POSI" (Japanese: 嘘の殻 EPISODE POSI)	January 25, 2004
5	"Shell of Lies, Nega"; Transliteration: "uso no kara NEGA" (Japanese: 嘘の殻 EPISODE NEGA)	February 1, 2004
6	"Shell of Memories (Note: Title given on the English DVDs, also known as "Shell of a Hundred Billion")"; Transliteration: "oku no kara" (Japanese: 憶の殻)	February 8, 2004
7	"Shell of Sorrow (Note: Title given on the English DVDs, also known as "Shell of Misery")"; Transliteration: "ai no kara" (Japanese: 哀の殻)	February 15, 2004
8	"Shell of Thoughts"; Transliteration: "sou no kara" (Japanese: 想の殻)	February 22, 2004
9	"Shell of Dreams"; Transliteration: "yume no kara" (Japanese: 夢の殻)	February 29, 2004
10	"Shell of The Cursed (Note: Title given on the English DVDs, also known as "Shell of Curses")"; Transliteration: "noroi no kara" (Japanese: 呪の殻)	March 7, 2004
11	"Shell of Illusions"; Transliteration: "maboroshi no kara" (Japanese: 幻の殻)	March 14, 2004
12	"Shell of Origin (Note: Title given on the English DVDs, also known as "Shell of Layers")"; Transliteration: "in no kara" (Japanese: 因の殻)	March 21, 2004
13	"Shell of Destruction (Note: Title given on the English DVDs, also known as "Shell of Fears")"; Transliteration: "futokoro no kara" (Japanese: 壊の殻)	March 30, 2004

== Production notes ==
- Mikura has pigtails in this adaptation, and blue eyes instead of yellow, though Mikura is occasionally shown without pigtails in some episodes. She is seen with same pigtails at end of Mezzo Forte.
- "Shell of Lies" is shown in two character perspectives. Part 'Posi' being Harada and Kurokawa, and part 'Nega' being Mikura.
- "Shell of Memories" depicts Harada (in a flashback) with black hair.
- In episode one "Shell of Love", a flashback shows two doctors discussing the autopsy of a famous musician. The name shown is Paul Lenon, most likely a reference to The Beatles, namely Paul McCartney and John Lennon.
- The opening credits begin with a heart transition, with Mikura dressed as an old woman, pulling off her mask and looking at the camera. This is based on a scene in the Majokko Megu-chan opening in which Megu appears as an old witch, removes her mask, and winks to the camera.
- Unlike the first two feature films Kite and Mezzo Forte which are licensed by Kitty Media and Anime Works, it was the first work by Yasuomi Umetsu not to include sex scenes and not to be licensed by Anime Works.
