= Mezzo Forte =

2000 original video animation

- DVD Poster (16 Up Cover) featuring Mikura Suzuki and Momomi Momoi

メゾフォルテ
- Genre: Girls with guns, hentai, crime
- Original video animation
- Directed by: Yasuomi Umetsu
- Produced by: Osamu Koshinaka; Tarō Miyabe
- Written by: Yasuomi Umetsu
- Music by: Tooru Shura
- Studio: ARMS
- Licensed by: AUS: Madman Entertainment; NA: Media Blasters (former) SoftCel Pictures
- Released: May 25, 2000 - June 25, 2001 (OVA edition); July 23, 2004 (movie edition)
- Runtime: OVA edition: 60 minutes Movie edition: 70 minutes
- Episodes: 2 (OVA edition); 1 (Movie edition)

Mezzo Forte (メゾフォルテ, Mezo Forute) is a 2000 original video animation (OVA) directed by Yasuomi Umetsu. In the United States these OVAs were edited into an anime movie that was released on DVD in the same year.

The OVA, which concerns a young woman, Mikura Suzuki, and her mercenary business, the Danger Service Agency (D.S.A.), is the spiritual sequel to Umetsu's Kite, as both feature the continuing elements of a highly trained female protagonist, dark comedic tone, extremely violent and slickly directed over-the-top action sequences, as well as the graphic sex scenes, which can be found only in the uncut version. Mezzo Forte takes place sometime after the events of Kite.

Like Kite, the OVA was released both in the United States and Japan in two different versions: one with graphic sex scenes taken out, and the other with them left intact. Both versions, however, retain the more violent aspects of the movie. The abridged version of Mezzo Forte, however, has no sex scenes and only contains two nude scenes (in which unobscured female breasts and labia are depicted). In addition, an international version was released in Japan on July 23, 2004. This version includes 20 minutes of extra footage, but none of the adult scenes found in the director's cut or the uncut version.

== Plot ==
Momokichi Momoi, the mob boss owner of a professional baseball team known as "the Peach Twisters", has a unique way of dealing with ineffective players: killing them. His daughter, Momomi, is twice as twisted as her father. Mikura, Kenichi, and Tomohisa of the Danger Service Agency are hired by a mysterious old man to kidnap Momokichi. The DSA attempts to kidnap Momokichi during a bowling match, but the operation goes awry when Momoi and Momokichi's bodyguards intervene. Mikura seems to recognize both Momokichi and Momomi, and Momomi seems to recognize Mikura before the DSA manages to escape. However, the DSA find out to their dismay that Momokichi was killed during the kidnapping. While sleeping Mikura dreams that Kenichi confesses his feelings for her which Mikura reciprocates and the pair have sex. After they finish, Tomohisa arrives and with Kenichi's consent, rapes Mikura while Kenichi watches.

Furious, Momomi orders her men and the police to begin a manhunt for the DSA. Meanwhile, the DSA bury Momokichi's body to hide it and confront the client about his true identity. The client reveals that he used to be a hitman under Momokichi's employ, but when he retired Momomi tried to have him killed. The client originally wanted to use Momokichi as insurance to escape the country, but with Momokichi dead, the only way for everybody to ensure their safety is to kill Momomi. They try to lure Momomi into the open by faking a ransom demand for Momokichi, but Momochi is determined to hunt them down anyways. She manages to capture Mikura, but Kenichi and Tomohisa manage to secretly replace her with a robot double. Unaware of the switch, Momomi hands the Mikura double to a pair of criminals as punishment. The criminals proceed to rape her repeatedly as revenge until the sex turns consensual and the Mikura double asks for more.

The DSA stage a fake hostage trade with a robot double of Momokichi, and both sides end up double crossing each other and a gunfight ensues. The real Mikura ambushes Momomi and kills her, and the client reveals that he is in fact Hiroka, Momokichi and Momomi's head of security. Hiroka admits that he used the DSA to eliminate the Momoi family so he can seize their empire, and prepares to kill the DSA now that their usefulness has ended. However, the DSA were aware of Hiroka's duplicity from the start, and kill him by self destructing the Momokichi double.

Afterwards, the DSA focus on rebuilding the damage the Momoi thugs caused to their base, with Mikura receiving a premonition about their next job and suggesting they accept it.

== Characters ==
The series concerns three characters who comprise the Danger Service Agency (DSA)

Mikura Suzuki (鈴木 海空来, Suzuki Mikura)
Voiced by: Tomoko Kotani (Japanese); Melissa Fahn (English), Marie Court (English sex scenes)

The team's combat specialist who enjoys shooting first and asking questions later. She also has a limited precognitive ability which enables her to see brief glimpses of the future, but she cannot control it. Mikura is strong, highly proficient at fighting and using firearms. She is determined, strong willed and can be a cold blooded killer if the situation requires her to be one. She is very competitive and unsociable, but she has a kind soul deep down. She also has a love of karaoke. Before the incident with the Momois, Mikura had visions which involved Momomi. In the uncut version, it is suggested she might have a crush on Kurokawa.

Kenichi Kurokawa (黒川 健一, Kurokawa Ken'ichi)
Voiced by: Taichirō Hirokawa (Japanese); John Snyder (English)

Team leader who is an ex-cop and loves eating noodles. He is partners with Mikura and Harada in the DSA or Danger Service Agency (often referred to as the "Risk Their Lives Trio" in the press). He loves noodles, drives a yellow Volkswagen Bug, howls at hot women and always cracks lame puns. Mikura and Harada refer to Kurokawa as "Pops" for short. He likes to think that he is in charge, and more often-or-not, he does arrange jobs for the DSA. However, his knowledge in underworld dealings is valuable to the team. When the DSA was contracted to kidnap a baseball owner, he thought he recognized his face.

Tomohisa Harada (原田 智久, Harada Tomohisa)
Voiced by: Takumi Yamazaki (Japanese); Jim Taggert (English)

The member of the Danger Service Agency who knows about all things technical. He's a pointy-haired young man who is infatuated with Mikura, but won't admit it to himself or others. He is an expert on Gynoids, Androids, and all things technical. In the beginning, he was working on a prototype for a Gynoid who acted as a prostitute and did sexual favors to those who would pay.

Momokichi Momoi (桃井 桃吉, Momoi Momokichi)
Voiced by: Shōzō Iizuka (Japanese); Bob Papenbrook (English)

The baseball owner in question. The owner of the Peach Twisters, Momokichi has had to deal with constant losing seasons of his beloved team. However, the usual tactic he employs to unload ineffective players is by killing them. He was one of the team owners suspected in "The Bloody Pennant Race", a series of killings of baseball players ten years prior. He is also an avid bowler, and would often be challenged by his daughter Momomi at a bowling alley he owned, the Peach Bowl.

Momomi Momoi (桃井 桃実, Momoi Momomi)
Voiced by: Rie Ishizuka (Japanese); Lynn Fischer (English)

Momokitchi Momoi's daughter. A very beautiful, large-breasted woman, Momomi is also very violent, often killing people on a whim. On all versions, she appears naked in a shower scene which show her breasts and labia. To cross this woman would be considered suicide. The instances of Momomi's talent for murder and violence are many. One rumor has it that she celebrated her tenth birthday by killing someone. Another rumor says her favorite color is red... blood red. Her room decor could be described as "psychotic panda", which is a wide-eyed cartoon giant panda. In the anime, she killed the manager and the pitching coach of the Peach Twisters for threatening to leak scandalous stories about Momomi presumably about her lesbian relationship with Sakura Sakarada (her lover in Mezzo DSA). And after Momokichi was kidnapped by the DSA, Momomi responded by taking an automatic pistol and killing her father's bodyguards for failing to do their jobs. Momomi, by account of her lesbian lover Sakura Sakurada, is also Mikura's half-sister, and possesses the same precognitive ability as Mikura. She had two visions that had involved Mikura, leading to an uncertain future.

== Sequel ==
A Mezzo Forte television series called Mezzo DSA aired in 2004. The series takes place after the events of OVA. Unlike the English dub for the OVA which was recorded in Los Angeles, the English dub for Mezzo DSA was recorded in Houston.
