= Wizard Barristers =

Japanese anime television series

- Cover of the first Blu-ray/DVD featuring main character Cecil Sudo

ウィザード・バリスターズ〜弁魔士セシル (Wizādo Barisutāzu: Benmashi Seshiru)
- Genre: Fantasy; Supernatural
- Anime television series
- Directed by: Yasuomi Umetsu
- Produced by: Shinichi Nakamura (Pony Canyon); Hiroshi Otaru (Showgate); Kazuaki Morijiri (Genco)
- Written by: Yasuomi Umetsu
- Music by: Kayo Konishi; Yukio Kondou
- Studio: Arms
- Licensed by: AUS: Madman Entertainment; NA: Sentai Filmworks
- Original network: Tokyo MX, Sun TV, KBS, TV Aichi, AT-X, BS11
- English network: SEA: Animax Asia, Anime Network
- Original run: January 12, 2014 – March 30, 2014
- Episodes: 12

Wizard Barristers (ウィザード・バリスターズ〜弁魔士セシル, Wizādo Barisutāzu: Benmashi Seshiru; Wizard Barristers: Benmashi Cecil) is an anime television series produced by Arms and directed by Yasuomi Umetsu. It is set in a world where ordinary humans co-exist with magic users, and magic users are represented in law by a subset of defense attorney (Bengoshi) called "wizard barristers" (Benmashi). The series follows Cecil Sudō, who has recently become the youngest wizard barrister in history. The series aired from January 12 to March 30, 2014.

== Plot ==
In 2018, humans and wizards live together in Tokyo. Police continue to protect order in society, but wizards known as Wud are tried according to magical law via Magic Prohibition Law, in special courts defended by wizard barristers via the Court for Magic. Half-Japanese, half-Canadian Cecil Sudō has just become the youngest wizard barrister and begins work at the Butterfly Law Office. Although Cecil has not realized it yet, she has tremendous magical potential.

== Characters ==
=== Butterfly Law Office ===
Cecil Sudō (須藤 聖知, Sudō Seshiru)
Voiced by: Rui Tanabe (Japanese); Brittney Karbowski (English)
The main protagonist who is Japanese Canadian. At 15 years old, she passed the national bar and at age 17, became the youngest wizard barrister in history. She has blue eyes and shoulder-length purple hair, mostly in two braids with multi-colored spherical beads at the ends, which shatter and have to be replaced when she uses her magic. She wears a loud colored "battle dress" including a miniskirt and rides a scooter. Her motive for becoming a wizard barrister is to rescue her mother Megumi from the death penalty. She has several magic powers, unlike most Wuds who only have one, which include manipulation of metal, fire and sand. Her most notable power is forming a giant robot vehicle called the "Diaboloid" from metal near her.
Natsuna Hotaru (穂樽 夏菜, Hotaru Natsuna)
Voiced by: Kei Shindō (Japanese); Kira Vincent-Davis (English)
Natsuna joined the law firm on the same day as Cecil and is initially jealous of Cecil's reputation as a wizard barrister. Eventually, after learning that Cecil intends to rescue Megumi from the death penalty, Natsuna becomes friends with Cecil. Her magic is taming dust and sand.
Mitsuhisa Hachiya (蜂谷 ミツヒサ, Hachiya Mitsuhisa)
Voiced by: Hiroki Tōchi (Japanese); David Wald (English)
Mitsuhisa is a prosecutor of the Court of Magic, but resigns when he awakened as a wizard and joins the law firm. He creates fast streams of water from thin air. He works alongside Cecil in a murder case, in which a girl named Mayu Saotome killed a manager named Ken Oizumi, who killed his employee and Mayu's lover Masato Namase.
Moyo Tentō (天刀 もよ, Tentō Moyo)
Voiced by: Ayana Taketatsu (Japanese); Monica Rial (English)
Moyo is a paralegal assistant with the body of Lucifer in human form who is attracted to Cecil. As archangel, she has many magic powers which she hides. Moyo may sense where Cecil is, secretly protecting her from dangerous situations.
Tsunomi Kabutohara (甲原 角美, Kabutohara Tsunomi)
Voiced by: Miho Arakawa (Japanese); Krystal LaPorte (English)
Tsunomi is a kind witch whose magic is manipulating wind into large gusts and blasts.
Koromo Sasori (左反 衣, Sasori Koromo)
Voiced by: Rumi Ōkubo (Japanese); Allison Sumrall (English)
Koromo is a witch who loves to make lewd puns accompanied by lewd actions like aggressively fondling her own breasts. Her magic is divination, or precognition, by the use of tarot cards.
Ageha Chōno (蝶野 アゲハ, Chōno Ageha)
Voiced by: Ayumi Tsunematsu (Japanese); Shelley Calene-Black (English)
The leader of the law firm, Ageha has no magical abilities, she is clever and quick thinking.
Seseri Chōno (蝶野 セセリ, Chōno Seseri)
Voiced by: Wataru Takagi (Japanese); Mark X Laskowski (English)
Seseri is Ageha's partner and brother in the law firm. He is stern, especially towards Cecil. His magic is creating human-sized robots.
Mitori Batta (抜田 美都利, Batta Mitori)
Voiced by: Yui Taya (Japanese); Ciara Parker (English)
Mitori is the receptionist and computer operator of the law firm. She does not have magical abilities, but her skills to quickly and accurately analyze and process any kind of information are supreme.
Tobirō Kamakiri (鎌霧 飛郎, Kamakiri Tobirō)
Voiced by: Chafurin (Japanese); James Belcher (English)
Tobirō is a clever old man of the law firm. His magic is illusions, such as making one person look like another. He first worked with Cecil on a murder case, in which a bowling alley manager named Takuma Kiritani was knifed by his employee Hiroyuki Suzui.

=== Shark Knight Law Office ===
Kiba Sameoka (鮫岡 生羽, Sameoka Kiba)
Voiced by: Junichi Suwabe (Japanese); Andrew Love (English)
Kiba is a member of the Labone, a pro-human group of Wuds. He seeks to protect Cecil from the Macal, an anti-human organization of Wuds.
Shibuki Kujira (工白 志吹, Kujira Shibuki)
Voiced by: Daisuke Ono (Japanese); Blake Shepard (English)
Kujira is a member Shark Knight Law Office whose magic power uses words to make people act against their will briefly.

=== Metropolitan Police Department ===
Shizumu Ekuso (柄工双 静夢, Ekusō Shizumu)
Voiced by: Katsuyuki Konishi (Japanese); Chris Patton (English)
Shizumu is the assistant and partner of Quinn who is secretly and illegally a Wud, sub-leader of the Macal, as well as the son of Makusu. He cares for Cecil despite his involvement with the Macal.
Quinn Erari (江来利 クイン, Erari Kuin)
Voiced by: Marina Inoue (Japanese); Rachel Robinson (English)
Quinn is Shizumu's partner who uses a gun as a weapon.

=== Familiars ===
Nana Genie (ナナジーニィ, Nana Jīnī)
Voiced by: Norio Wakamoto (Japanese); Rob Mungle (English)
Nana Genie is Cecil's familiar who resembles an anthropomorphic frog. He has a perverted personality and tries to sexually assault Cecil and makes suggestive remarks. Nana Genie is also revealed to be a very skillful cook.
Bubuhyi (ブブヒィ, Bubuhī)
Voiced by: Yuki Yoshinari (Japanese); Monica Rial (English)
Bubuhyi is Mitsuhisa's familiar who resembles an anthropomorphic pig.
Kokki (コッキ)
Voiced by: Saki Ogasawara (Japanese); Joanne Bonasso (English)
Kokki is Tsunomi's familiar who resembles an anthropomorphic chicken.

=== Other characters ===
Kyusaku Odagiri (小田切 久作, Odagiri Kyūsaku)
Voiced by: Iemasa Kayumi (Japanese); Carl Masterson (English)
Odagiri is the current president of the Court of Magic.
Megumi Sudō (須藤 芽美, Sudō Megumi)
Voiced by: Rie Miyoshi (Japanese); Tiffany Grant (English)
Megumi is Cecil's mother.
Shimon Makusu (麻楠 史文, Makusu Shimon)
Voiced by: Rikiya Koyama (Japanese); Josh Morrison (English)
Makusu is the chief justice of the Supreme Court. He is secretly and illegally a Wud, the head of Macal, as well as the father of Shizumu. Makusu attempted to summon Lucifer using Cecil as a catalyst, but Shizumu prevents that from happening.
Katase (片瀬)
Katase is the prosecutor for Megumi and Makusu's cases as well as a conspirator with Makusu.
Sōta Kohinata (小日向 創太, Kohinata Sōta)
Voiced by: Takanori Ōyama (Japanese); Darren Bush (English)
Sōta is Cecil's first client who is wrongly accused of belonging to the Wud robbery gang "No Face" and killing a fellow gang member.

== Media ==
=== Light novel ===
A light novel titled Wizard Barrister: Benmashi Cecil The Beginning (ウィザード・バリスターズ 弁魔士セシル The Beginning, Wizādo Barisutāzu: Benmashi Seshiru The Beginning), written by Michiko Itou and illustrated by Yasuomi Umetsu was published March 3, 2014, by Pony Canyon. The novel depicts the early life of Cecil Sudo, before becoming a barrister.

=== Anime ===
An anime adaptation produced by studio Arms – written and directed by Yasuomi Umetsu with scripts by Michiko Itō – aired in Japan between January 12, 2014, and March 30, 2014. It premiered on Tokyo MX on January 12, 2014, and was subsequently aired on Sun TV, KBS, TV Aichi, AT-X and BS11. The anime was simulcasted in English on Crunchyroll and licensed by Sentai Filmworks for North America. The opening theme song "Justitia" is performed by Lia and the ending theme song "Blue Topaz" by Rui Tanabe.

==== Episode list ====
No.	Title	Original release date
1	"Sword and Scales (Lady Justice)" "Redi Jasutisu" (レディ・ジャスティス)	January 12, 2014
Cecil Sudō, a teenage prodigy as a wizard barrister, runs late for her first day at the Butterfly Law Office. Because of this, none of the coworkers take Cecil seriously due to her age and attire. Ageha Chōno, the leader of the law firm, assigns Cecil to work with law firm associate Koromo Sasori on a case dealing with a bank robbery that was conducted by a Wud gang with fire magic called "No Face". Shizumu Ekuso and Quinn Erari of the Metropolitan Police Department are accusing a former bank clerk named Sōta Kohinata, who is revealed to be a Wud with water magic, for working as an accomplice for the gang despite killing a gang member during the bank robbery. However, Cecil deduces that Souta was actually trying to protect another employee named Keiko Endō out of affection for her. Cecil and law firm paralegal assistant Moyo Tentō are later attacked by a pair of wizards. Cecil uses her metal magic to create a Diaboloid to scare away the pair of wizards, only to be captured by the police as a result.
2	"Hard Case" "Hādo Kēsu" (ハード・ケース)	January 19, 2014
With the pretrial conference coming up, Cecil still has no objective evidence to prove Souta innocent. During the pretrial, Cecil claims that Souta was using self-defense as the legitimate reason for his actions. Law firm receptionist Mitori Batta shows Cecil and Ageha an image of the Metaboloid associated with No Face. Before Cecil attends the trial, Ageha takes Cecil to the hideout of No Face found at an abandoned factory near a bridge, only to be surrounded by the gang members. Cecil summons the Diaboloid while three gang members summon their Metaboloid, and she defeats them in battle at the river. Meanwhile, when the other gang members try to attack Ageha, law firm coworkers Natsuna Hotaru, Tsunomi Kabutohara, and Seseri Chono arrive to defend her. Before Souta is sentenced to death, Cecil enters the courthouse in time with a captured gang member, who confirms that Souta has no affiliation with No Face. With Souta now proven innocent, Cecil has won her first case.
3	"Love and Hate" "Rabu ando Heito" (ラブ・アンド・ヘイト)	January 26, 2014
Kiba Sameoka and Suzuki Kujira of the Shark Knight Law Office try to recruit Cecil into their law firm, but she declines their offer. Law firm coworker and former prosecutor Mitsuhisa Hachiya works on a case on Mayu Saotome, who is suspected of using wave magic to cause an explosion, resulting in a fatality of a manager named Ken Oizumi. Two years ago, when Mitsuhisa was a prosecutor, he sentenced an employee of Oizumi with ice magic named Masato Namase to death for breaking the magic prohibition law. However, Masato attempted to break free from the shackles and escape his retribution. In the present, Shizumu and Quinn figure out that Mayu was in love with Masato, hence the reason why she avenged his death. During the trial, Mitsuhisa uses his water magic to free Mayu from her shackles, but Mayu destroys the courtroom with her wave magic instead of planning to take his life alone. Mayu fights Cecil when the latter tries to reason with the former, causing Cecil to awaken her fire magic in defense. However, Mayu is shot in the chest by Shizumu, greatly saddening Mitsuhisa.
4	"Personality Crisis" "Pāsonariti Kuraishisu" (パーソナリティ・クライシス)	February 2, 2014
A serial killer named Tsukuji Shimizu is arrested for murdering fifteen Wuds. However, his older twin brother Rei Shimizu wants the Butterfly Law Office to defend Tsukuji in court. Rei reveals that Tsukuji has dissociative identity disorder, which explains his overall violent behavior. During the trial, Cecil testifies that Tsukuji has dissociative identity disorder, and he is admitted to a mental institution as his reduced life sentence in prison. When Tsukuji mentions about her hairpieces before being sent away, Cecil becomes suspicious. She later goes to the mental institution in an isolated room and confronts Rei for lying about Tsukuji having dissociative identity disorder, but she is unable to use her metal magic and fire magic against him. Koromo sends Ageha and Mitsuhisa to rescue Cecil, and Rei is scared when Moyo also arrives. Rei tries to attack using his Metaboloid, but Cecil awakens her sand magic to subdue Rei so Quinn can arrest him. Although Tsukuji and Rei are both in custody, Shizumu seems to be a double agent for the two, now knowing that Cecil has three forms of magic.
5	"Six Nine" "Shikkusu Nain" (シックス・ナイン)	February 9, 2014
Kiba turns to Cecil to defend Shibuki from a charge of the murder of a bowling alley manager named Takuma Kiritani, and law firm coworker Tobirō Kamakiri is assigned to work on the case with Cecil. Tasked to find the real killer before Shibuki is indicted within a few days, Cecil and Tobirō fail to find any physical evidence. Cecil struggles to cooperate with Tobirō since he always slows her down, but is called out by both Seseri and Natsuna for not giving Tobirou a chance despite his old age. Tobirō later shows Cecil a schedule roster, in which an employee named Hiroyuki Suzui shared an identical schedule with Takuma. When Hiroyuki drives to the woods at night, Tobirou uses his illusion magic to appear as Takuma, a ruse to prove that Hiroyuki used a knife to murder Takuma, while Cecil manages to tape a recording of the confession. During the trial, Cecil and Tobirō use the physical evidence in order to clear the charge of murder against Shibuki, but Tobirou faints in the middle of the courthouse and is sent to the hospital. However, Cecil returns to the law firm and learns from Koromo that Tobirō was faking his collapse.
6	"Hero Show" "Hīrō Shō" (ヒーロー・ショー)	February 16, 2014
Tsunomi invites Cecil to a costume party during the weekend. On the way there, Cecil spots a Metaboloid piloted by a Wud gang called "Gumeguma". This gang takes a group of children and a teacher hostage in a cram school, and Cecil ends up also becoming a captive. Tsunomi arrives at the scene in an attempt to save them all, but she is taken hostage as well. When the Metropolitan Police Department raid the cram school, the teacher tries to escape, but the gang leader shoots him down. The gang leader then shoots Cecil, but Moyo secretly appears and alters the direction of the bullet to prevent Cecil from being killed. Then, the gang leader summons his Metaboloid and captures one of the children, which urges Cecil to summon her Diaboloid to rescue the child. Cecil destroys the Metaboloid and forces Gumeguma to retreat. Shizumu follows them to an abandoned building and shoots all of them down, but he is forced to give up his gun to Quinn when she catches up to him. It is revealed that Shizumu submitted an application which grants Cecil permission to use her magic without any penalties.
7	"Maple Leaf in Canada" "Meipuru Rīfu in Kanada" (メイプルリーフ・イン・カナダ)	February 23, 2014
Cecil, Natsuna, Koromo, Tsunomi, Mitsuhisa and Seseri take a long flight to Boston for training purposes. Seseri tells Natsuna to drive Cecil to Canada in order to allow Cecil to visit her father. However, Natsuna is surprised when the car that was lent to her was not properly maintained. As they continue their trip past sundown, Cecil and Natsuna pick up a hitchhiker named Kaede, who is studying abroad to become a wizard barrister. The three of them discuss their thoughts on the need for wizard barristers, and Cecil later reveals that she started her law studies at age thirteen. After having a picnic, Natsuna recounts her past affair with a married professor when she attended college, and Kaede reminisces about when she stargazed with her father a lot when she was younger. Cecil explains that her mother, Megumi, is on death row for using magic as self-defense against criminals. The next day, the three of them finally cross the border into Canada. They go inside a restaurant, only to encounter a wanted homicidal killer named Geir Grimm, but they are luckily saved by Kiba and Shibuki.
8	"Saint Christopher Charm" "Kurisutofā Chāmu" (クリストファー・チャーム)	March 2, 2014
Cecil and Natsuna part ways with Kaede before the two of them visit Cecil's father David Sudo, who is pursuing a career in photography. Natsuna learns from Cecil that Megumi killed someone in order to protect her. Meanwhile, Koromo, Tsunomi, Mitsuhisa and Seseri hang out at the beach, but their tour guide Diana leads them into an abandoned restaurant to stage an attack. Mitsuhisa and Tsunomi try to repel Diana's fire magic, but she proves to be too strong. While out rowing in a canoe at a lake, Natsuna offers to help Cecil research about Megumi's case, but they are attacked by a Metaboloid, which soon destroys Cecil's family home. In response, Cecil summons her Diaboloid to defeat the Metaboloid. When it is shown that Kaede was the one piloting the Metaboloid, Kaede reveals that her father was a gang member of No Face. Diana and Kaede each die unknowingly by Moyo before they attempted to reveal who ordered the attacks. The orders came from Macal, an anti-human organization of Wuds.
9	"Secret Puzzle" "Shīkuretto Pazuru" (シークレット・パズル)	March 9, 2014
Six years ago, Cecil and Megumi visited Cecil's friend Akua Oda in an apartment. They were taken hostage at the roof, where Akua's father Kyōsuke Oda, who was a police officer, accidentally shot Cecil while trying to apprehend the kidnappers. Megumi then used her fire magic to kill Kyosuke in response. As a result, Megumi was put on death row. In the present, the members of the Butterfly Law Office watch a broadcast of a press conference with Shimon Makusu, the chief justice of the supreme court. He shares his opinion of allowing humans and Wuds to work together in the judicial system. Cecil goes out alone to see Shindaiji, the judge during Megumi's case, but he refuses to talk to her. After Cecil turns to Shizumu for help, Ageha lets her know that she has friends that she can ask for support. When Cecil waits to meet Shizumu in the shopping district at night for the case file, Kiba suddenly appears and take her with him, telling her to run from Shizumu. After Cecil realizes that Shizumu is a Wud, Kiba reveals to her that she died six years ago during the hostage incident.
10	"Imposters" "Inposutā" (インポスター)	March 16, 2014
As Kiba tries to fend off Shizumu, Moyo appears and draws Cecil away from the fight. Shizumu arrests Kiba for the charge of possible human trafficking. Ageha and Seseri are surprised that they are not allowed to speak with Kiba. Cecil contemplates what she recently learned while talking to Moyo. Quinn becomes more and more suspicious of Shizumu, especially when he shoots at Shibuki, who runs away from the Shark Knight Law Office to avoid being searched. Because of this, Shizumu uses his wind magic to mortally wound Quinn. Cecil returns to the Butterfly Law Office and explains the situation regarding Megumi's case. Meanwhile, Makusu and Shizumu, shown as the leaders of the Macal, discuss about using Cecil as the catalyst in order to summon Lucifer. Cecil meets up with Shibuki at night in the park, where he reveals that he is a part of the Labone, a pro-human group of Wuds. He explains that the Macal is trying to fulfill the prophecy from a book called Grimoire 365. Cecil thinks back to all the circumstances where she awakened each of her magic abilities. Shibuki warns Cecil about Moyo before he takes his leave.
11	"Shining Cecil" "Shainingu Seshiru" (シャイニング．セシル)	March 23, 2014
Shizumu attacks the members of the Butterfly Law Office and eventually captures Cecil. In the hospital, Moyo revives Quinn from terminal care. The Macal use Cecil as the catalyst to summon Lucifer, revealed to be Moyo in demon form. After Cecil fuses with Moyo and awakens as Lucifer, she rejects to take any orders from Makusu and declares that she will be one with Cecil instead. Shizumu stops Cecil from fully becoming Lucifer, but Makusu kills Shizumu for taking away his only chance of gaining ultimate power. Cecil summons her Diaboloid and Makusu summons his Metaboloid, before they both engage in a fierce battle all over the city. Makusu chases Cecil into the atmosphere, but they plummet from the sky after both of their metal magic abilities deteriorate. Cecil grows wings and spares Makusu from dying. Later, Cecil visits Megumi in prison, saying that David was the one who told Makusu to resurrect her six years ago. Then, Cecil is contacted by Ageha, who tells her that Makusu wants her to represent him during his impeachment trial.
12	"Fact or Fiction (Judgment)" "Jajjimento" (ジャッジメント)	March 30, 2014
Makusu tells Cecil that he will confess the truth in court if she defends him during the trial. Cecil thinks back when David called her to unveil exactly what happened six years ago. During the pretrial, Makusu's prosecutor, Katase, demands to drop all charges against Makusu. Cecil wishes that she could find Grimoire 365 after discussing about it with Kiba and Shibuki. During the trial, Makusu claims that Cecil just imagined him summoning Lucifer, killing Shizumu and creating a Metaboloid. Katase prevents Cecil from getting Makusu to reveal the actual truth since she has no physical evidence to prove otherwise. Thanks to Shizumu leaving behind a protective charm that she once had given him, she unseals it and reveals Grimoire 365 hidden inside, turning the case in her favor. Makusu frees himself from the shackles and attacks the courthouse. After Natsuna, Mitsuhisa and Tsunomi block his attacks, Cecil defeats Makusu. The trial is suspended, and Makusu is taken into custody as punishment.
