= Rin-Sin =

Japanese animator

Rin-Sin (りんしん)
- Other name: Maya Suzuki (鈴木真矢)
- Occupations: Animator, character designer
- Years active: 1986–present
- Employer(s): Atelier Fukurou (1986–1992); Studio Kikan (1993–1996); Arms (1996–2015); Pierrot Plus (2015–2020); Studio Signpost (2020–)

Rin-Sin (りんしん; also romanized as Lin Sin and Rin Shin) is a Japanese character designer, animator, and illustrator.

== Career ==
Rin-Shin did not originally intend to become an animator. After high school, she was interested in being a manga artist and even received an interview at a certain "famous manga artist's studio", but plans fell through midway and she decided to join the animation studio of director Kiyomu Fukuda (Kan Fukumoto) instead. Upon moving and visiting the studio for the first time, she questioned what kind of "dilapidated house" the studio environment was due to the fact that it was located in an older house with trash and other things littered about, which was a standard circumstance for small studios at the time. Due to her Fukuda being a relative, her parents allowed her to continue working at the company despite the physical state of the studio. She struggled early on as there were some who helped her learn about the animation process, but it was not enough and she ultimately was not taught properly. After only a week, she considered moving back home but believed she could not face her parents having only lasted a week at the job.

She was stuck doing in-between and trace work for a period of around six months and worked extensively on overseas subcontracting projects like Thundercats (1985). According to Fukuda, she struggled to draw clean lines (a necessity for the in-between/trace process) and instead was given key animation work. While she believed that it was easy at first, she realized that the director was fixing much of her work. Much of her key animation was rejected and had to be redone (a process called "retake"), with only some of her work being accepted, which depressed her. Eventually, she saw a comment left by one of the episode directors for a retake of some of her work, which helped her to understand different approaches to animation.

== Works ==
=== Teleivison series ===
Year	Title	Director(s)	Studio	CD (Note: Character designer.)	CAD (Note: Chief animation director.)	AD (Note: Animation director.)	KA (Note: Key animator.)	Other roles and notes	Ref(s)
2004	Mezzo DSA	Yasuomi Umetsu	Arms	No	No	No	Yes		
2004	Elfen Lied	Mamoru Kanbe	Arms	No	No	No	Yes		
2004	Kakyuusei 2	Yousei Morino	Arms	No	No	No	No	Eyecatches	
2006	High School Girls	Yoshitaka Fujimoto	Arms	No	No	No	Yes	Eyecatch	
2007	Himawari Too!!	Shigenori Kageyama	Arms	No	No	Yes	No		
2007	Ikki Tousen: Dragon Destiny	Katsuma Kanazawa	Arms	Yes	Yes	Yes	No		
2007	Genshiken 2	Kinji Yoshimoto	Arms	No	No	Yes	No		
2008	To Love-Ru	Takao Kato	Xebec	No	No	No	Yes		
2008	Ikki Tousen: Great Guardians	Koichi Ohata	Arms	Yes	Yes	No	No		
2009	Queen's Blade: The Exiled Virgin	Kinji Yoshimoto	Arms	Yes	Yes	Yes	Yes		
2009	Queen's Blade 2: The Evil Eye	Kinji Yoshimoto	Arms	Yes	Yes	Yes	Yes		
2010	Ikki Tousen: Xtreme Xecutor	Koichi Ohata	TNK	Yes	No	No	No		
2010	Samurai Girls	KOBUN	Arms	No	No	Yes	No		
2012	Queen's Blade Rebellion	Yousei Morino	Arms	Yes	Yes	Yes	No	Ending illustration	
2012	Aesthetica of a Rogue Hero	Rion Kujou	Arms	No	No	Yes	No		
2013	Samurai Bride	KOBUN	Arms	No	No	Yes	No		
2013	Wanna Be the Strongest in the World!	Rion Kujou	Arms	Yes	No	No	No		
2015	Re-Kan!	Masashi Kudoh	Pierrot Plus	No	No	Yes	Yes		
2017	Convenience Store Boy Friends	Hayato Date	Studio Pierrot	No	No	Yes	No		
2017	Dynamic Chord	Shigenori Kageyama	Studio Pierrot	No	No	No	Yes		
2018	Tokyo Ghoul:re	Toshinori Watabe	Studio Pierrot	No	Yes	No	No		
2019	Ikki Tousen: Western Wolves	Takashi Watanabe (chief); Mitsutoshi Satou	Arms	Yes	Yes	No	No		
2020	Kingdom 3	Kenichi Imaizumi; Kazuya Monma	Studio Signpost	No	Yes	No	Yes	Sub-character designer	
2022	Shin Ikki Tousen	Rion Kujou	Studio Signpost (Arms)	Yes	No	No	No		
2022	Kingdom 4	Kenichi Imaizumi; Kazuya Monma	Studio Signpost	No	Yes	No	No	Sub-character designer	
2024	Kingdom 5	Kenichi Imaizumi	Studio Signpost	No	Yes	No	No	Sub-character designer	
2025	Kingdom 6	Kenichi Imaizumi	Studio Signpost	No	Yes	Yes	No	Sub-character designer	

=== OVAs ===
Year	Title	Director(s)	Studio	CD	CAD	AD	KA	Other roles and notes	Ref(s)
1992	La Blue Girl (2–4)	Kan Fukumoto; Rinjo Yanagikaze	Studio Kikan	Yes	No	Yes	Yes		
1994	New La Blue Girl	Kan Fukumoto; Rinjo Yanagikaze	Studio Kikan	Yes	No	Yes	Yes		
1994	Twin Dolls	Kan Fukumoto	Studio Kikan (Dandelion)	Yes	No	Yes	Yes		
1994	Shin Angel	Hiromitsu Oota; Kaoru Toyooka	Arms (Triple X)	Yes	No	No	No		
1994	Venus 5	Osamu Inoue; Kan Fukumoto	Arms (Dandelion)	Yes	No	No	No		
1995	Twin Angels	Kan Fukumoto	Arms (Dandelion)	Yes	No	Yes	No		
1995	Dragon Rider	Katsuma Kanazawa	Arms (Triple X)	No	No	No	Yes		
1996	Demon Beast Resurrection	Kan Fukumoto	Arms (Dandelion)	No	No	No	Yes		
1996	Dōkyūsei 2	Yousei Morino	Arms (Triple X)	Yes	No	No	Yes		
1996	Lady Blue	Kan Fukumoto	Arms (Dandelion)	Yes	No	Yes	Yes		
1997	Class Reunion	Kan Fukumoto	Arms (Triple X)	No	No	No	Yes		
1998	Kite	Yasuomi Umetsu	Arms	No	No	No	Yes		
1998	Midnight Panther	Yousei Morino	Arms	Yes	No	Yes	No		
1999	Dōkyūsei 2: Sotsugyōsei	Akio Sakai	Imagin	Yes	No	No	No		
1999	Words Worth	Kan Fukumoto	Arms	Yes	No	Yes	Yes		
2000	First Kiss Story	Kan Fukumoto	Arms (Garyuu Studio)	No	No	No	Yes		
2000	Mezzo Forte	Yasuomi Umetsu	Arms	No	No	No	Yes		
2001	Inma Seiden	Kan Fukumoto	Arms	Yes	No	Yes	Yes		
2001	La Blue Girl Returns	Hiroshi Ogawa; Yoshitaka Fujimoto	Arms	Yes	No	No	No		
2002	Words Worth Gaiden	Tsuneo Tominaga	Arms	Yes	No	No	No		
2002	From I"s	Yousei Morino	Studio Pierrot; Arms	Yes	No	No	No		
2003	Crimson Climax	Katsuma Kanazawa	Arms	No	No	No	Yes		
2003	Body Transfer	Yoshitaka Fujimoto	Arms	No	No	No	Yes		
2004	Kawarazaki-ke no Ichizoku 2 The Animation	Yousei Morino	Arms	No	No	No	No	Original character designer	
2004	Immoral Sisters: Blossoming	Yousei Morino	Arms	Yes	No	No	No		
2005	Hininden: Gauss	Kan Fukumoto	Arms	Yes	No	Yes	No	Original creator	
2005	I"s Pure	Mamoru Kanbe	Arms; Studio Pierrot	Yes	No	Yes	No		
2008	Kite Liberator	Yasuomi Umetsu	Arms	No	No	No	Yes		
2010	Queen's Blade: Beautiful Warriors	Kinji Yoshimoto	Arms	Yes	Yes	Yes	Yes		
2011	Queen's Blade	Yousei Morino	Arms	Yes	Yes	No	No		
2011	Ikki Tousen: Shuugaku Epic Battle	Masashi Kudoh	Arms	Yes	No	No	No		
2014	Vanquished Queens	Shin Itagaki	Hoods Entertainment	Yes	No	No	No		
2014	Ikki Tousen: Extravaganza Epoch	Masashi Kudoh	Arms	Yes	No	No	No		
2016	Queen's Blade: Grimoire	Kinji Yoshimoto	Fortes	Yes	No	No	No		

== =References ==
- Rin-Sin (2001). りんしん自選原画集 [Rin-Sin Selected Gengashuu]. KSS. ISBN 978-4877094966.
