= Ikki Tousen: Xtreme Xecutor =

- Season 4
- No. of episodes: 12

Release
- Original network: AT-X, Chiba TV, TVK, TV Saitama, Tokyo MX, TV Aichi, Sun Television
- Original release: March 26 – June 11, 2010

Season chronology
- ← Previous; Ikki Tousen: Great Guardians Next → Shin Ikki Tousen

The fourth season of Ikki Tousen, titled Ikki Tousen: Xtreme Xecutor, is an anime television series based on the manga by Yuji Shiozaki, published by Wani Books and serialized in the seinen manga magazine Comic GUM. A fourth season, titled Ikki Tousen: Xtreme Xecutor (一騎当千 XTREME XECUTOR, Ikkitōsen Ekustorīmu Eguzekutā), was announced. Produced by TNK and ARMS, the series is directed and written by Koichi Ohata, music by Yasuharu Takanashi, characters by Rin Shin and Junji Goto, and produced by Hiromasa Minami, Hisato Usui, Keisuke Kawai, Shinsaku Tanaka, and Takuro Hatakeyama. The series aired twelve episodes on AT-X between March 26 and June 11, 2010, with subsequent broadcasts on Chiba TV, TVK, TV Saitama, Tokyo MX, TV Aichi, and Sun Television. The opening theme is "Stargazer" by Yuka Masuda while the ending theme is "Endless Soul: Endless Warrior" (Endless Soul 〜終わりなき戦士, Endless Soul ~Owarinaki Senshi) by Masumi Asano and Aya Endo. Xtreme Xecutor is licensed in North America by Funimation Entertainment, as with the first and third seasons.

== Episode list ==
No. overall	No. in season	Title	Original release date
38	1	"Wet Fighter"; Transliteration: "Nureru Tōshi" (Japanese: 濡れる闘士)	March 26, 2010
39	2	"Gathering Allies"; Transliteration: "Tsudō Nakama" (Japanese: 集う仲間)	April 2, 2010
40	3	"Lion in Training"; Transliteration: "Kitaeru Shishi" (Japanese: 鍛える獅子)	April 9, 2010
41	4	"The Devil Beckons"; Transliteration: "Maneku Akuma" (Japanese: 招く悪魔)	April 16, 2010
42	5	"Bonds of the Soul"; Transliteration: "Tamashii no Kizuna" (Japanese: 魂の絆)	April 23, 2010
43	6	"Swarming Fangs"; Transliteration: "Muragaru Kiba" (Japanese: 群がる牙)	April 30, 2010
44	7	"Silent Tears"; Transliteration: "Chinmoku no Namida" (Japanese: 沈黙の涙)	May 7, 2010
45	8	"Reunion of the Fists"; Transliteration: "Saikai ha Kobushi" (Japanese: 再会は拳)	May 14, 2010
46	9	"Angry Love"; Transliteration: "Ikaru Ai" (Japanese: 怒る愛)	May 21, 2010
47	10	"Shredded Darkness"; Transliteration: "Sakareta Yami" (Japanese: 裂かれた闇)	May 28, 2010
48	11	"Fiery Castle"; Transliteration: "Moeru Shiro" (Japanese: 燃える城)	June 4, 2010
49	12	"Future: Unlimited"; Transliteration: "Mirai Mugen" (Japanese: 未来無限)	June 11, 2010

== Home Media release ==
=== Japanese ===
Six DVD and Blu-ray volumes were released by Media Factory between June 25 and November 25, 2010. The DVD/BDs contains an original video animation called Ikki Tousen: Xtreme Xecutor - A Dream's Six Views (一騎当千 XTREME XECUTOR 〜ユメ六景〜).
