= Studio Signpost =

Japanese animation studio

St. Signpost Co., Ltd.
- Native name: 株式会社スタジオ サインポスト
- Romanized name: Kabushiki-gaisha Sutajio Sainposuto
- Formerly: Studio Kikan Co., Ltd. (1993–2009); Pierrot Plus Co., Ltd. (2009–2019)
- Type: Kabushiki-gaisha
- Industry: Animation studio
- Predecessor: Animation 21; Hero Communications; Atelier Fukurou
- Founded: March 10, 1959; 67 years ago
- Founder: Keiji Kusano (as Studio Kikan); Yoshikazu Tochihira (as Studio Kikan)
- Headquarters: 2-19-5 Igusa, Suginami, Tokyo, Japan
- Key people: Ken Hagino (Note: Chairman and CEO (代表取締役会長)); Naoyuki Oshikiri (Note: President and CEO (代表取締役社長))
- Revenue: ¥ 1,160,000,000 (2018)
- Total equity: ¥ 10,000,000
- Number of employees: 38 (as of August 2023)
- Parent: Studio Pierrot
- Website: www.st-signpost.co.jp

St. Signpost Co., Ltd. (Japanese: 株式会社スタジオ サインポスト, Hepburn: Kabushiki-gaisha Sutajio Sainposuto) is an animation studio subsidiary of Pierrot. The studio is an associate-member of The Association of Japanese Animations.

== History ==
The company was founded in 1959 as a magazine advertising agency. Its history between then and the late 1980s is generally unknown, but the company began reorganizing into an animation business called Studio Kikan (スタジオ旗艦) around 1989. Sources disagree on the exact foundation date as a rebranded animation studio. Despite starting reorganization in 1989, sources differ on the company's official date of rebranding. The company was first credited in 1993 and the Association of Japanese Animations listed the studio's foundation date in April 1993, while the company began unofficial animation activities as early as 1992 and the National Corporation Directory claims Studio Kikan's foundation date as October 1992. The new animation business was established by ex-Hero Communications and ex-Urban Product producer Keiji Kusano—who served as the company's first president and CEO—and producer Yoshikazu Tochihira, formerly of the short-lived Animation 21. The studio was physically based out of the Animation 21 office in Nerima. Director Kiyomu Fukuda and the staff of his Atelier Fukurou studio, including animators Tatsuya Kawashima and Rin Shin (the latter of whom is also a relative of Fukuda's), also joined the company.

The company initially took on production of various OVAs, including hentai works. Studio MTV originally intended to produce La Blue Girl with director Kinji Yoshimoto in 1992, but the company closed from bankruptcy during production of the first episode, and he was not involved with the direction at all. Studio Kikan then took over production as its first unofficial work (episode 2) and official work (episodes 3 and 4). (Note: Although episodes 3 through 6 are credited to Studio Kikan, the interview broadly refers to it as the product of Arms.) The initial production period was also difficult as much of the work was subcontracted overseas. Fukuda, directing under the penname Kan Fukumoto (ふくもとかん), and Rin-Sin visited South Korea where much of the animation was being outsourced to. According to Fukuda, much of the key animation was rejected and had to be redone from scratch, while Rin-Sin was doing her first job as both animation director and character designer. According to Osamu Shimizu, another ex-Hero Communications producer who joined Studio Kikan, the cel-photography stage of the animation was produced in Korea, as well.

The studio's first television series also debuted that year as the long running Shima Shima Tora no Shimajirō, which was originally meant to be produced at Animation 21 before it closed down due to financial issues. With the exception of Lady Blue, a sequel to La Blue Girl, the company started using the brand names Dandelion (ダンディライオン) and Triple X for hentai OVA productions. In 1996, Arms was founded as a separate production label and studio to take over Studio Kikan's hentai business, with Shimizu as the head of the company. Despite the separation of the entities as separate studios, the two companies worked with the same producers and animation staff. Starting around 1995, the majority of productions and episodes outsourced from other studios either went under the Dandelion and Triple X labels, or were credited to Arms itself. Another label, Garyuu Studio (呀龍スタジオ), was also briefly used between 1999 and 2005.

Arms and Studio Kikan used Mac computers by the mid-1990s for use in CGI and digital processing. According to Junichi Watanabe (director), a director for Demon Beast Resurrection (1996) and Kawarazaki-ke no Ichizoku the Animation (1996) under the names Zaamen Kuukai (座亞面空海) and Ankokudou Shimi (闇黒堂蠧魚), other companies often had Mac computers as well, but those studios generally only allowed specialized staff to use them. At Arms/Kikan, however, he noted that any staff were free to use the computers, which he utilized for CGI work and to hasten certain processes that were quite slow through solely analog systems like making stained glass glow.

The two companies started taking on outsourcing work from Studio Pierrot in 199, with episodes of Microman (1999), Great Teacher Onizuka (1999), and Tokyo Mew Mew (2000) being outsourced to the Garyuu Studio label. In 2002, the Garyuu Studio label was used to co-produce From I"s under Pierrot, which eventually led to Arms taking on full animation production responsibility for I"s Pure under Pierrot's production in 2005. Producer Osamu Koshinaka commented on the decline of hentai works into the 2000s, and Arms eventually switched fully to TV animation production in 2005.

A decade after first starting the relationship that extended into producing episodes of Naruto (2002–2017) and Bleach (2004–2012), Studio Kikan became a subsidiary of Pierrot and changed its name to Pierrot Plus (ぴえろプラス), sometimes written as Pierrot+, in 2009. Kusano retired as CEO of the company but was retained as chairman of the board with Shimizu replacing him, thereby becoming CEO of both the renamed Pierrot Plus and Arms concurrently. With the Pierrot Plus rebranding, the two companies simultaneously produced television works under their name until around 2015 when Arms as a production house seemingly ceased operations. Arms changed its trade name to Common Sense (株式会社コモンセンス) in 2017 but maintained the Arms label as a trade name, and the company's final product, Ikki Tousen: Western Wolves, was released in 2019. By then, most of the staff had already reorganized entirely under Pierrot Plus, and Pierrot was subcontracting entire series like Tsukiuta The Animation (2016) and Tokyo Ghoul:re (2018) to the studio.

On September 20, 2019, the company changed its name again to Studio Signpost (stylized as St. Signpost). Ken Hagino, a prominent producer at Pierrot since the 1990s, was appointed as the new CEO, with Kusano retiring as chairman and Shimizu taking a position on the board. The following year, Arms was dissolved and liquidated following a shareholder meeting, though Studio Signpost continues to use Arms as a brand name for works like Shin Ikki Tousen as of 2022. In 2026, Hagino was made chairman and co-CEO of the company with former Pierrot producer Naoyuki Oshikiri taking the role of president and co-CEO.

== Works ==
=== Television series ===
Year	Title	Director(s)	Animation producer(s)	Source	Eps.	Refs.
1993–2008	Shima Shima Tora no Shimajirō	Hisayuki Toriumi	Producer: Shintarou Kozaki; Yoshikazu Tochihira	Manga	726	
1994–1995	Karaoke Senshi Mike Jiro	Tsutomu Shibayama	Producer: Yoshikazu Tochihira	Manga	20	
1994–1995	Chō Kuse ni Narisō	Tetsuya Endo	Producer: Yoshikazu Tochihira	Manga	39	
2008–2010	Hakken Taiken Daisuki! Shimajirou			Manga	101	
2009–2010	Letter Bee	Akira Iwanaga	Osamu Shimizu	Manga	25	
2010–2011	Letter Bee Reverse	Akira Iwanaga	Osamu Shimizu	Manga	25	
2010–2012	Shimajirou Hesoka			Manga	101	
2011–2012	Beelzebub	Yoshihiro Takamoto	Osamu Shimizu	Manga	60	
2014	Survival Game Club!	Masahiko Ohta	Kazuyoshi Ozawa	Manga	12	
2015	Re-Kan!	Masashi Kudō	Osamu Koshinaka; Kazuyoshi Ozawa	Manga	13	
2016	Onigiri	Takashi Yamamoto	Shingo Chiba	Video game	13	
2016	The Morose Mononokean	Akira Iwanaga	Shintarou Nozaki	Manga	13	
2018	Magical Girl Ore	Itsuro Kawasaki	Kazuyoshi Ozawa; Shingo Chiba	Manga	12	
2018	Late Night! The Genius Bakabon	Tooru Hosokawa	Ryouga Mizoguchi	Manga	12	
2019	The Morose Mononokean II	Itsoru Kawasaki	Osamu Shimizu; Shingo Chiba	Manga	13	
2019	Ultramarine Magmell	Hayato Date	Kazuyoshi Ozawa	Manhua	13	
2020	Oda Cinnamon Nobunaga	Hideotoshi Takahashi	Shingo Chiba	Manga	12	
2020–2021	Kingdom (season 3) (co-animated with Pierrot)	Kenichi Imaizumi; Kazuya Monma	Yasuyuki Ogoshi	Manga	26	
2022	Kingdom (season 4) (co-animated with Pierrot)	Kenichi Imaizumi; Kazuya Monma	Yasuyuki Ogoshi	Manga	26	
2022	Shin Ikki Tousen	Rion Kujou	Shintarou Nozaki	Manga	3	(Note: Although Arms is credited with the animation production of Shin Ikki Tousen, the company declared bankruptcy in 2020, and Studio Signpost used "Arms" as a brand name for production of the work.)
2023	My Clueless First Friend	Shigenori Kageyama	Osamu Shimizu	Manga	13	
2024	Kingdom (season 5) (co-animated with Pierrot)	Kenichi Imaizumi	Yasuyuki Ogoshi	Manga	13	
2024	TsumaSho	Noriyuki Abe	Shintarou Nozaki	Manga	12	
2025	Kingdom (season 6) (co-animated with Pierrot)	Kenichi Imaizumi	Yasuyuki Ogoshi	Manga	13	

=== OVAs ===
Year	Title	Director(s)	Animation producer(s)	Source	Eps.	Refs.
1992–1993	La Blue Girl (episodes 2–4)	Kan Fukumoto	Producer: Kento Maki	Manga	3	
1993	Dochinpira	Hiromitsu Oota	Producer: Yoshiharu Sakashita (Note: From Studio Marine, which did gross outsourcing work on the OVA.)	Manga	1	
1993–1994	Naniwa Kinyuu Den: Minami no Teiou	Yoshitaka Fujimoto	Producer: Hiroshi Iwakura	Manga	2	
1994	Butt Attack Punisher Girl	Iku Suzuki	Producer: Osamu Shimizu	Manga	1	
1994	Butt Attack Punisher Girl R	Hiroshi Yoshida	Producer: Osamu Shimizu	Manga	1	
1994	New La Blue Girl	Kan Fukumoto	Producer: Kento Maki	Manga	2	
1994	Venus 5 (as Dandelion)	Osamu Inoue (1); Kan Fukumoto (2)	Producer: Kento Maki	Original work	2	
1994	Seijuuden: Twin Dolls (as Dandelion)	Kan Fukumoto	Producer: Kento Maki	Original work	2	
1994	Demon Beast Invasion (episodes 5–6) (as Dandelion)	Jun Fukuta	Producer: Kento Maki	Manga	2	
1994–1995	Wild 7	Kiyoshi Egami	Nagateru Katou; Keiji Kusano	Manga	2	
1994–1995	Dōkyūsei: End of Summer (as Triple X)	Kinji Yoshimoto; Setsuo Takase; Shoujirou Okami	Hiroshi Iwakura; Osamu Koshinaka; Kazumitsu Takashima	Eroge	4	
1994–1995	Shin Angel (as Triple X)	Kaoru Toyooka	Producer: Osamu Koshinaka	Manga	5	
1994–1995	My Sexual Harassment (as Triple X)	Yousei Morino	Kenji Toyota; Shouji Kumabe (Note: The president of Studio Kuma.)	Manga	3	
1995	Dragon Knight Gaiden (as Triple X)	Kaoru Toyooka	Producer: Kenji Toyota	Video game	1	
1995	Kakyuusei (as Studio Chameleon and Triple X)	Kan Fukumoto	Producer: Saburou Oomiya	Original work	4	
1995–1996	Dragon Rider (as Triple X)	Katsuma Kanazawa	Producer: Saburou Oomiya	Manga	2	
1995–1996	Dōkyūsei Climax (as Triple X)	Takashi Kobayashi (1); Kan Fukumoto (2)	Hiroshi Iwakura; Kenji Toyota; Osamu Koshinaka; Kazumitsu Takashima	Eroge	2	
1995–1997	Twin Angels (as Dandelion)	Kan Fukumoto	Producer: Kento Maki	Original work	8	
2008	Naisho no Tsubomi	Akira Shigino		Manga	3	
2008–2009	Master of Martial Hearts	Yoshitaka Fujimoto	Producer: Keiji Kusano	Original work	5	
2010	Beelzebub: Jump Festa 2010 Special	Yoshihiro Takamoto	Producer: Osamu Shimizu	Manga	1	

=== Gross outsource ===
Series in which Studio Signpost, Pierrot Plus, or Studio Kikan served as a gross (full) outsourcing studio, either for singular episodes or across entire series.

List of gross outsources
Year	Title	Primary contractor(s)	Director(s)	Episode(s)	Note(s)	Refs.
2005	Magical Girl Lyrical Nanoha A's	Seven Arcs	Keizō Kusakawa	4		
2005–2009	Bleach	Pierrot	Noriyuki Abe	23 episodes (Note: 24, 28, 42, 51, 103, 110, 117, 127, 134, 149-150, 157, 159, 167, 176, 180, 182, 187, 204, 221, 225, 229, 237)		
2006	Himawari!	Arms	Shigenori Kageyama	1–13		
2007	Himawari Too!!	Arms	Shigenori Kageyama	1–13		
2007	Deltora Quest	OLM	Mitsuru Hongo	34		
2012	Hiiro no Kakera: The Tamayori Princess Saga 2	Studio Deen	Bob Shirahata	9		
2012	Road to Ninja: Naruto the Movie	Pierrot	Hayato Date		Film	
2013	Rozen Maiden: Zurückspulen	Studio Deen	Mamoru Hatakeyama	4, 8, 12		
2013	I Couldn't Become a Hero, So I Reluctantly Decided to Get a Job	Asread	Kinji Yoshimoto	7		
2013	Gatchaman Crowds	Tatsunoko Production	Kenji Nakamura	6		
2013	Freezing Vibration	A.C.G.T	Takashi Watanabe	9		
2013–2014	Gaist Crusher	Pierrot	Yoshihiro Takamoto	1–51		
2016	Soul Buster	Pierrot	Kōbun Shizuno; Toshinori Watanabe	1–12		
2016	Tsukiuta the Animation	Pierrot	Itsuro Kawasaki	1–12		
2017	Convenience Store Boy Friends	Pierrot	Hayato Date	1–12		
2017	Dynamic Chord	Pierrot	Shigenori Kageyama	1–12		
2018	Tokyo Ghoul:re	Pierrot	Toshinori Watanabe	1–24		
2019	Astra Lost in Space	Lerche	Masaomi Andō	4		
2019	A Certain Scientific Accelerator	J.C.Staff	Nobuharu Kamanaka	7		
2019	Arifureta: From Commonplace to World's Strongest	Asread	Kinji Yoshimoto	2, 8, 11		

== Notable staff ==
=== Representative staff ===
- Keiji Kusano (co-founder, president of Studio Kikan (1992~2009))
- Yoshikazu Tochihira (co-founder and animation producer, 1992~2008)
- Osamu Shimizu (Studio Kikan producer (1992~2009), president of Arms (1996~2020, president of Pierrot+ (2009~2019), board member of St. Signpost (2019~present))
- Ken Hagino (president of Studio Signpost (2019~present))

=== Animation producers ===
- Shintarou Nozaki (1994~present, also a part of Arms)
- Shingo Chiba (2007~present)
- Yuuya Kumagai (2013~2019)
- Kazuyoshi Ozawa (2013~2019)
- Osamu Koshinaka (also a part of Arms)
- Yasuyuki Ogoshi (also a part of Arms)

=== Directors ===
- Kiyomu Fukuda (1992~2015, also a part of Arms)
- Keizō Kusakawa (1993~2000, also a part of Arms)
- Yasuomi Umetsu (1997~2017, also a part of Arms)

=== Animators ===
- Maya "Rin Shin" Suzuki (1992~, also a part of Arms)

== Notes ==
=== Citations ===
- Takano, Hideo, ed. (1997). 野々村病院の人々&河原崎家の一族 THE ANIMATION [Nonomura Byouin no Hitobito & Kawarazaki-ke no Ichizoku The Animation]. KSS. ISBN 978-4877091613.
- Harada, Nobuyoshi; Murasue, Jirou, eds. (1999). 淫獣学園 La☆Blue Girl ～陽の章～ [Injuu Gakuen La Blue Girl ~You no Shou~] (in Japanese). Soryusha. ISBN 4-88386-010-8.
- Rin-Shin (2001). りんしん自選原画集 [Rin-Shin Selected Gengashuu]. KSS. ISBN 978-4877094966.
- Hoshi, Makoto (2022). まんだらけZENBU No.113 [Mandarake ZENBU No. 113]. Mandarake Publishing Department. ISBN 978-4-86-072202-9.
