= Genco =

Japanese animation studio

Genco Inc.
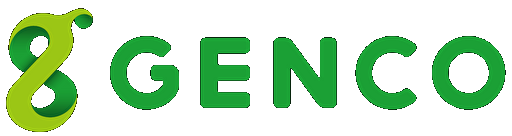
- Native name: 株式会社ジェンコ
- Romanized name: Kabushiki-gaisha Jenko
- Type: Kabushiki gaisha
- Industry: Anime production
- Founded: March 3, 1997; 29 years ago
- Headquarters: 106-0032 Roppongi, Minato, Tokyo, Japan
- Key people: Tarō Maki, president
- Owner: GC Holdings
- Website: www.genco.co.jp

Genco, Inc. (株式会社ジェンコ, Kabushiki-gaisha Jenko) is a Japanese anime production enterprise, founded on March 3, 1997. Presided over by Tarō Maki, its headquarters is located in Roppongi, Minato, Tokyo. It has produced numerous anime series such as Honey and Clover, Nodame Cantabile, Elfen Lied, Kino's Journey, Accel World, Sword Art Online, Genshiken and Toradora. It has also co-produced original creations like Yasuomi Umetsu's Wizard Barristers and did project collaborations like in Hero Tales (with Hiromu Arakawa and Studio Flag) and in Xebec's Mnemosyne no Musume-tachi.

== Productions ==
Genco produced most of ARMS' non-hentai titles and A.C.G.T's animation projects. It also works with J.C. Staff in some of its productions.

Title	Year	Studio	Involvement
Battle Athletes	1997	AIC	Planning, Co-Production
Tenchi the Movie 2: The Daughter of Darkness	1997	AIC	Co-Production
Nazca	1998	Radix	Production
Serial Experiments Lain	1998	Radix	Co-Production
St. Luminous Mission High School	1998	Triangle Staff	Production
Super Doll Licca-chan	1998	Madhouse	Production
Super Milk-chan	1998	Tokyo Kids	Production
Amazing Nurse Nanako	1999	Radix	Production
Space Pirate Mito	1999	Triangle Staff	Production
Aoi and Mutsuki: A Pair of Queens	1999	Triangle Staff	Production
Tenchi Forever! The Movie	1999	AIC	Planning Association
Azumanga Web Daioh	2000	J.C.Staff	Production
Dotto! Koni-chan	2000	Shaft	Production
NieA_7	2000	Triangle Staff	Production
Azumanga Daioh - The Very Short Movie	2001	J.C.Staff	Production
Alien Nine	2001	J.C.Staff	Creation, Production
Figure 17	2001	OLM	Production
Millennium Actress	2001	Madhouse	Production
Azumanga Daioh: The Animation	2002	J.C.Staff	Production
A Tree of Palme	2002	Palm Studio	Production
Arcade Gamer Fubuki	2002	Shaft	Production
EX-Driver: The Movie	2002	Actas	Production
Onegai Teacher	2002	Daume	Production
Seven of Seven	2002	A.C.G.T	Original Idea, Planning, Production, Series Composition
Binzume Yosei	2003	Xebec	Planning
Ikkitousen	2003	J.C.Staff	Production
Eiken	2003	J.C.Staff	Production
Kino's Journey	2003	A.C.G.T	Production
Nanaka 6/17	2003	J.C.Staff	Production
Onegai Twins	2003	Daume	Production
Tokyo Godfathers	2003	Madhouse	Production
Daphne in the Brilliant Blue	2004	J.C.Staff	Production
Doki Doki School Hours	2004	J.C.Staff	Production
DearS	2004	Daume	Production
Elfen Lied	2004	ARMS	Production
Ichigeki Sacchu!! HoiHoi-san	2004	Daume	Production
Genshiken	2004	ARMS	Production
Kujibiki Unbalance	2004	Ajiado	Production
Tetsujin 28th	2004	Palm Studio	Production
Guyver: The Bioboosted Armor	2005	OLM	Production
Honey and Clover	2005	J.C.Staff	Production
PetoPeto-san	2005	Xebec M2	Production
Zettai Shounen	2005	A.C.G.T	Production
Asatte no Houkou	2006	J.C.Staff	Production
Girl's High	2006	ARMS	Production
Himawari!	2006	ARMS	Production
Honey and Clover II	2006	J.C.Staff	Production
Project Blue Earth SOS	2006	A.C.G.T	Production
Renkin 3-kyu Magical ? Pokan	2006	Remic	Production
Super Robot Wars Original Generation: Divine Wars	2006	OLM	Production
Zero no Tsukaima	2006	J.C.Staff	Production
Deltora Quest	2007	OLM	Production
Himawari!!	2007	ARMS	Production
Hitohira	2007	Xebec M2	Production
Hero Tales	2007	Studio Flag	Production
Ikkitousen: Dragon Destiny	2007	ARMS	Production
KimiKiss: Pure Rouge	2007	J.C.Staff	Production
Nodame Cantabile	2007	J.C.Staff	Production
Tetsujin 28-go: Hakuchu no Zangetsu	2007	Palm Studio	Production
Zero no Tsukaima: Futatsuki no Kishi	2007	J.C.Staff	Production
Ikkitousen: Great Guardians	2008	ARMS	Production
Mnemosyne no Musume-tachi	2008	Xebec	Co-Production
Monochrome Factor	2008	A.C.G.T	Production
Nodame Cantabile: Paris	2008	J.C.Staff	Animation Production, Production
Shigofumi: Letters from the Departed	2008	J.C.Staff	Production
Shina Dark	2008	Shaft	Production
Toradora!	2008	J.C.Staff	Production
Zero no Tsukaima: Princesses no Rondo	2008	J.C.Staff	Production
Maria Holic	2009	Shaft	Production
Phantom ~Requiem for the Phantom~	2009	Bee Train	Production
Queen's Blade: The Exiled Virgin	2009	ARMS	Production
Dance in the Vampire Bund	2010	Shaft	Production
Ichiban Ushiro no Daimao	2010	Artland	Production
Ikkitousen: Xtreme Xecutor	2010	TNK	Production
Kuragehime	2010	Brain's Base	Production
Nodame Cantabile: Finale	2010	J.C.Staff	Animation Production, Production
Ookami-san and Her Seven Companions	2010	J.C.Staff	Production
Queen's Blade: Beautiful Warriors	2010	ARMS	Production
Queen's Blade 2: The Evil Eye	2010	ARMS	Production
Hyakka Ryoran Samurai Girls	2010	ARMS	Production
Ikkitousen: Shuugaku Toushi Keppu-roku	2011	TNK	Producer, Production
Maji de Watashi ni Koi Shinasai!	2011	Lerche	Production
Accel World	2012	Sunrise	Production
Aesthetica of a Rogue Hero	2012	ARMS	Production
Waiting in the Summer	2012	J.C.Staff	Production
High School DxD	2012	TNK	Production
Ixion Saga DT	2012	Brain's Base	Production
Maria Holic Alive	2012	Shaft	Production
Queen's Blade Rebellion	2012	ARMS	Production
Vanquished Queens	2012	ARMS	Production
Sekai de Ichiban Tsuyoku Naritai!	2012	ARMS	Production
Sword Art Online	2012	A-1 Pictures	License Management, Production, Project Generalisation
Golden Time	2013	J.C.Staff	Production
The Devil Is a Part-Timer!	2013	White Fox	Production (under Hitomi Araki)
High School DxD New	2013	TNK	Production
Kin-iro Mosaic	2013	Studio Gokumi	Production
Maoyu	2013	ARMS	Production
Sakurasou no Pet na Kanojo	2013	J.C.Staff	Production
Hyakka Ryoran Samurai Bride	2013	ARMS	Production
Senran Kagura	2013	Animation Studio Artland	Production
Unbreakable Machine-Doll	2013	Lerche	Production
Bladedance of Elementalers	2014	TNK	Production
Daimidaler the Sound Robot	2014	TNK	Production
Gokukoku no Brynhildr	2014	ARMS	Production
Invaders of the Rokujyōma!?	2014	Silver Link	Production
SoniAni: Super Sonico the Animation	2014	White Fox	Production
Sushi Ninja	2014	Genco; Sprite Animation Studios	Production
Sword Art Online II	2014	A-1 Pictures	License Management, Production
Wizard Barristers	2014	ARMS	Production
Is It Wrong to Try to Pick Up Girls in a Dungeon?	2015	J.C.Staff	Production
Shimoneta: A Boring World Where the Concept of Dirty Jokes Doesn’t Exist	2015	J.C.Staff	Production
Gate: Jieitai Kano Chi nite, Kaku Tatakaeri	2015	A-1 Pictures	Production
Valkyrie Drive	2015	ARMS	Production
Hello!! Kin-iro Mosaic!	2015	Studio Gokumi	Production
Prison School	2015	J.C.Staff	Production
Seisen Cerberus: Ryūkoku no Fatalite	2016	Bridge	Production
Minami Kamakura High School Girls Cycling Club	2017	J.C.Staff; A.C.G.T	Production
Is It Wrong to Try to Pick Up Girls in a Dungeon?: Sword Oratoria	2017	J.C.Staff	Production
Seven Mortal Sins	2017	Bridge	Production
Knight's & Magic	2017	8-Bit	Production
Dies Irae	2017	A.C.G.T	Production
Konohana Kitan	2017	Lerche	Production
Toji no Miko	2018	Studio Gokumi	Production
High School DxD HERO	2018	Passione	Production
Sword Art Online Alternative: Gun Gale Online	2018	3Hz	Production
Magical Girl Ore	2018	Pierrot+	Production
Rokuhōdō Yotsuiro Biyori	2018	Zexcs	Production
Happy Sugar Life	2018	Ezóla	Production
Between the Sky and Sea	2018	TMS Entertainment; Double Eagle	Co-Production
Million Arthur	2018	J.C.Staff	Production
Senran Kagura Shinovi Master	2018	TNK	Production
Sword Art Online: Alicization	2018	A-1 Pictures	Production
Sorcerous Stabber Orphen	2020	Studio Deen	Production
Pluto	2023	Studio M2	Co-Production
Berserk of Gluttony	2023	A.C.G.T	Production
A Journey Through Another World	2024	EMT Squared	Production
Re:Monster	2024	Studio Deen	Production
A Gatherer's Adventure in Isekai	2025	Tatsunoko Production; SynergySP	Production
Patlabor EZY	2026	J.C.Staff	Production
