= Master of Martial Hearts =

Japanese OVA series

- An image of the contestants in Zettai Shougeki II: All but one are in the original Zettai Shougeki and in the OVA Master of Martial Hearts - From left to right: Izumi, Saki, Yu, Rin, Miko, Aya, Aoi (exclusive to ZSII), Natsume, Azusa, Emi, Rei, Yueli

絶対衝激〜プラトニックハート〜
- Genre: Martial arts
- Original video animation
- Directed by: Yoshitaka Fujimoto
- Produced by: Hidemasa Tasaka; Keiji Kusano; Toshio Iizuka
- Written by: Hideki Shirane
- Music by: Masaru Kuba
- Studio: Studio Kikan
- Licensed by: AUS: Madman Entertainment; NA: AnimEigo; UK: Manga Entertainment
- Released: October 29, 2008 – February 25, 2009
- Runtime: 30 minutes
- Episodes: 5
- Manga
- Written by: Atsushi Kuragami
- Published by: Futabasha
- Magazine: Comic High!
- Original run: September 2008 – January 2010
- Volumes: 3

Master of Martial Hearts, originally titled Zettai Shougeki: Platonic Heart (絶対衝激〜プラトニックハート〜, Zettai Shōgeki: Puratonikku Hāto), is a 2008–2009 Japanese original video animation series created by Studio Kikan and Shochiku. It concerns a high school girl who gets involved in a series of fights against other young women with the Martial Heart (Platonic Heart in English subtitled and the Japanese version) as the prize; a jewel that can grant any wish. The series ran from October 29, 2008, to February 25, 2009, and was subsequently adapted into Manga. On January 7, 2010, Funimation Entertainment announced that it had licensed the OVA series in English. The series was released in North America on August 10, 2010. AnimEigo recently license rescued it and they will release the series on Blu-ray in 2026.

== Development ==
The series is based on the video game Zettai Shōgeki - Platonic Heart. The characters are designed by Jin Happobi who has illustrated adult games such as Boin. ARMS has produced fan service titles such as Queen's Blade and they made the characters distinct and more realistically proportioned. The musical score was done by Masaru Kuba. The series was directed by Yoshitaka Fujimoto, who had worked on the comedy Girl's High.

A website was launched for the series in July 2008.

== Characters ==
=== Main ===
- Aya Iseshima (伊勢島 綾, Iseshima Aya) is in her second year in high school. In the OVA, she is a generally cheerful and pleasant girl who has a crush on her best friend's brother, but has angsty moods where she mopes and whines. She is pulled into the tournament when Miko drops out and mysteriously disappears. She is a capable fighter, having learned fighting techniques from her mother. When Aya fights, she can turn into a maddening rage, resulting in devastating damage. She is voiced by Kaori Nazuka in the Japanese version, and by Trina Nishimura in the English dub.
- Natsume Honma (本間 棗, Honma Natsume) is Aya's best friend. In the OVA, Natsume's supportiveness for Aya is an act—in the final episode, she betrays Aya and reveals that she, her brother, and Miko have all conspired to exact revenge on Aya and her family. Natsume's mother is Kumi, the sister of Yumi Kazuki, Miko's mother. Natsume is voiced by Satomi Akesaka in the Japanese version, and by Cherami Leigh in the English dub.
- Miko Kazuki (香月 美子, Kazuki Miko) is a shrine maiden. In the OVA, she initially appears in a fight against Rei, a young woman dressed as a flight attendant. After Aya defeats Rei, Miko explains that she is participating in a tournament that grants any wish upon victory. Seeing that her wish of making friends was fulfilled by Aya and Natsume, she tries to withdraw from the tournament. However, Miko mysteriously disappears later on. Miko later appears at the end of the series as a vengeance-filled enemy of Aya as her mother, Yumi Kazuki, and her aunt, Kumi, were involved in a previous tournament with Aya's mother (Suzuko) ruining their lives. Miko reveals that her father was Shigeyuki Iseshima, who is Aya's father. Even though Aya believed Shigeyuki died in a car accident, in actuality, he stabbed Yumi Kazuki on Miko's fourth birthday and was killed by Kumi the same day. Miko had been looking for Suzuko and her daughter her entire life—she finally achieved her goal upon meeting her cousins, Haruki (Natsume's brother) and Natsume. Their vengeful plan was formed after Miko met Natsume. Miko is voiced by Ai Nonaka in the Japanese version, and by Alexis Tipton in the English dub.

=== Supporting ===
- Haruki Honma (本間 治基, Honma Haruki)
  - Natsume's brother, whom Aya has a crush on. It is revealed in the final episode that Haruki is in a relationship with Miko all along. Tatsuhisa Suzuki voices him in the Japanese version and Ian Sinclair voices him in the English dub.
- Suzuko Iseshima (伊勢島 涼子, Iseshima Suzuko)
  - Aya's mother. She won the previous tournament, dooming Kumi and Yumi Kazuki to sexual slavery. In the final episode, she infiltrates the hideout of Miko, Haruki, and Natsume. Suzuko sets the area on fire and confronts the three perpetrators to save Aya's life. After informing the trio of what their grandfathers did she snaps the necks of Haruki, Miko, and Natsume when they tried to attack her. Suzuko then bandages Aya's wounds, apologizes to her, and helps her flee the building. Afterwards, Suzuko stays behind in the burning building and checks Aya's phone—she finds out that the pieces of the Martial Heart have not been completed. The burning building then collapses, with Suzuko's fate unknown. Naoko Matsui voices her in the Japanese version and Shelley Calene-Black voices her in the English dub.

=== Competitors ===
For the Zettai Shougeki: Platonic Heart video game, the following women were listed in the lineup on the official site as competitors along with the main three girls.

- Azusa Suma (須磨 梓, Suma Azusa) is Aya's chemistry teacher. Azusa attacks by calling out a chemical formula and then uses a combination of punches and kicks based on it. Although Azusa criticizes Aya for not studying, she has reservations for fighting her. Azusa's motivation for fighting in the tournament is to find her missing father. Azusa is enslaved by Miko after losing to Aya, and Miko uses her as the first "example" of the fate that befalls the losers of the tournament; Aya tries to make her return to sanity, but Azusa is so far gone that she cannot. She is voiced by Luci Christian in the English dub.
- Rei Kakizaki (柿崎 怜, Kakizaki Rei) is a flight attendant. In the OVA she had worked since high school to care for her younger brother, since her parents were no longer alive. Her brother fell ill with an incurable disease and she wanted to get money through the tournament to give him adequate medical treatment. By the end of the series, Rei's brother had died; having been tortured to insanity, Miko points out that it is impossible for Rei to know that her brother is dead. Rei's weapons are a handbag with blades and a spiked scarf. Voiced by: Colleen Clinkenbeard (English)
- The Daimonji Sisters are part of the alliance. They attempted to scout Aya within their ranks. Sharing Azusa and Rei's fate, all of them are enslaved by Miko after losing.
  - Emi Daimonji (大門寺 笑, Daimonji Emi): Nurse. Voiced by: Ami Koshimizu (Japanese); Lindsay Seidel (English)
  - Yu Daimonji (大門寺 優, Daimonji Yū): Police officer. Voiced by: Ryōko Shintani (Japanese); Brittney Karbowski (English)
  - Saki Daimonji (大門寺 咲, Daimonji Saki): Geisha. Voiced by: Shiho Kawaragi (Japanese); Caitlin Glass (English)
- Rin Hiroishi (広石 倫, Hiroishi Rin) is a Japanese idol singer dressed as a maid. Like all of the ladies before her, Rin is enslaved by Miko after losing. Kristi Kang voices her in the English dub.
- Getsurei Ryu (Yueli Liu) (劉 月麗, Ryū Getsurei; also "Geturei", Pinyin: Liú Yuèlì)
  - Yueli is a Chinese-Japanese psychic. Yueli manages to advance to the final round along with Aya, who is her opponent. Yueli attempts to inform Aya about Miko's true nature, only to provoke Aya, leading to her death. Monica Rial provides her English voice.
- Izumi Hayakawa (早川 泉, Hayakawa Izumi)
  - Dressed in a white suit, Izumi works for Miko and her group. In the final episode she betrays her masters and tries to strangle Miko, only to be shot dead by Haruki. Wendy Powell provides her English voice.

Other contestants include:

- Megumi Shimoyama (下山 恵, Shimoyama Megumi)
  - Megumi is a mechanic that is very quickly defeated by Aya and then enslaved by Miko. Jamie Marchi provides her English voice.
- Aoi Ishikawa (石河 葵, Ishikawa Aoi)
  - Aoi is a delinquent who appears in Zettai Shougeki: Platonic Heart II.

=== Others ===
- Takumi Yoshida (吉田 琢磨, Yoshida Takumi)
  - Takumi is Aya's perverted physical education teacher. He tries to force Aya to run around the track field with revealing gym clothes for being late, only to have his perverted fantasies foiled by Azusa. Sonny Strait provides his English voice.
- Fake Haruki
  - The fake Haruki is in cahoots with Izumi, working for Miko's group. He has a tendency to alter his physical appearance with plastic surgery to flirt with any girl he sees fit. He meets his demise along with Izumi under the real Haruki, who shoots them dead.
- Kumi Honma (née Kazuki)
  - The mother of Natsume and Haruki. Several years ago, Kumi and her sister Yumi Kazuki were sold into sexual slavery to a man overseas after she lost the Martial Heart tournament to Suzuko Iseshima. Her vocal cords were destroyed to prevent her from screaming, and she has a noticeable scar on her neck. She escaped from her overseas master and used sign language and writing to tell her children what happened, then through the years she conditioned them to seek revenge for the horrors inflicted on her.. At the end, Suzuko reveals that Kumi had killed Shigeyuki Iseshima after he killed Yumi. Kumi also has a habit of stabbing pictures with Aya in it with a razor blade. In the final episode, she answers the door and is frightened at the sight of the outsider, strongly implied to be Aya. Kumi's actual fate left for open interpretation, but it's believed that Aya killed her either as punishment or to stop the whole cycle of revenge.

== Media ==
=== OVA ===
Previews were presented in "blog parts" (miniature applets for blogs) that showcased the bodies of the various characters. Shochiku released the first volume of the series in Japan on October 25, 2008. Subsequent episodes have been released monthly.

The opening theme of the series is "Tatsumaki Wave" (タツマキWAVE) by Little Non. The closing theme for episode 5 is "Zero Gravity" also by Little Non. The OVAs were released in Japan between October 29, 2008, and February 25, 2009.

No.	Title	Original release date
1	"Destiny Sprints Into Motion" "Hashiridasu Shukumei" (走り出す宿命)	October 29, 2008
Aya Iseshima is walking home with her best friend Natsume Honma from their high school, when they walk right into the middle of a fight between a teenage girl dressed as a shrine maiden and a young woman dressed as a flight attendant. The priestess looks like she is in trouble, so Aya knocks out Rei Kakizaki, the flight attendant. The priestess is thankful and introduces herself as Miko Kazuki. She has been fighting in a tournament in which the prize is a gem called the Martial Heart (Platonic Heart) which can grant a wish. Aya, Natsume, and Miko become friends, and since Miko's wish of making friends is now granted, she withdraws from the tournament. However, later that night, Aya discovers Miko's apartment has been ransacked with Miko nowhere to be found; she realizes that the Martial Heart not only grants the wish of the winner, but also banishes the losers.
2	"A Reason to Fight" "Tatakau Riyū" (戦う理由)	November 27, 2008
Aya's new friend Miko disappears without of trace and it seems she can never be found. Aya now has to compete to win her friend back but her next opponent is her favorite teacher, Azusa Suma. Unfortunately, she's a science teacher. But her dark side comes out and defeats her as her teacher is her first opponent.
3	"Three Sisters, Sworn Enemies" "Onteki no Sanshimai" (怨敵の三姉妹)	December 20, 2008
Aya tries to find her new friend but no luck. So she decided to go to a local pool to calm her down. Just then she faces off against another opponent, Yu Daimonji, a lady cop in a bikini. Aya has to face Yu's sisters, Saki the geisha and Emi the nurse. To make matters worse, she has to deal with the opponent's environment that has added to its challenges.
4	"Silently, Like Secrets" "Shizuka ni Ori no Yō ni" (静かに、澱のように)	January 28, 2009
Aya is in a sea of turmoil as she wonders whether it was really Haruki Honma, Natsume's brother, she saw as the leader of the martial heart and her semifinal match is in a maid cafe. Her opponent is Rin Hiroishi. As always, she finds a way to win against her opponent.
5	"Flames" "Homura" (焔)	February 25, 2009
Aya faces her final opponent, Ryu Getsurei, a self-proclaimed clairvoyant. Getsurei tells Aya that the tournament is nothing more than a trick by Miko. Angered, Aya ends Getsurei's life. Miko takes Aya into a warehouse where all of her past opponents are being held. Explosives go off throughout the building and it catches on fire. Suzuko tells everyone they are all caught in a web of vengeance. Suzuko kills Haruki, Miko and Natsume as they couldn't accept the truth. She bandages up Aya and tells her she will atone for Aya's sins, staying in the burning building as Aya makes her escape. Natsume's mother Kumi is at home, stabbing pictures of Aya with a knife when the doorbell rings. She opens the door and displays a look of terror, indicting Aya is there.

=== Other media ===
Atsushi Kuragami, who did Debiru Naebiru, has serialized a manga version for Futabasha's Comic High! magazine with its debut on August 22, 2008.

Slotter Mania V: Zettai Shougeki Platonic Heart II, a pachinko-style game featuring characters from the series, was released for the PS Vita.

Ten companies have planned to expand the franchise into mobile devices, music CD and other merchandise.

== Reception ==
The OVA series received negative reviews from critics. Theron Martin of Anime News Network likens the series to Ikki Tousen where women fight each other with "clothes-shredding attacks" but wrote that Master of Martial Hearts has more extreme fan service such as exposed breasts. The plot "exists almost entirely to give excuses for staging cosplay-like battles." Stig Høgset of THEM Anime Reviews found the show "a pretty simple and terrible story with a really awkward and dumb plot twist at the end, it's just impossible to recommend this show for anyone." He instead recommended other titles for those who are "up for the whole 'sexy girls chopsocky' thing." Mike Ferreira of the Anime Herald wrote that it is "without a doubt, one of the most offensive, vile pieces of crap to pass through my DVD player. It makes Ikki Tousen look like The Gentleman’s Guide in comparison. There are absolutely no redeeming qualities to speak of, and everything just seems to go to extremes to repulse the viewer." Bamboo Dong of Anime News Network praised Funimation for "cutting one of the funniest and most attention-grabbing trailers in recent anime history. Their coinage of 'Boobs, butts, and burgers' is genius", however, "Considering the terrible storyline, the complete lack of characterization, the lackluster animation, and the ear-splitting music, and the complete disregard for science, there is no redeeming feature of this show. Unless, of course, you want something to whack off to." Chris Beveridge of Mania.com found the story to be formulaic with awkward pacing, and leading to a spectacular train wreck of the final episode.
