= Shin Ikki Tousen =

- No. of episodes: 3

Release
- Original network: AT-X
- Original release: May 17 – May 31, 2022

Season chronology
- ← Previous; Ikki Tousen: Xtreme Xecutor

Shin Ikki Tousen (真・一騎当千) is a 3-episode anime television series which aired on AT-X from May 17-31, 2022. It is based on the manga of the same name by Yuji Shiozaki (a sequel to Shiozaki's original Ikki Tousen manga), which was originally published by Shōnen Gahōsha on November 30, 2015, and serialized in the seinen manga magazine Young King OURs.

The series was announced on July 2, 2021. It is produced by Arms and directed by Rion Kujo, with scripts written by Masaya Honda, character designs handled by Rin-Sin and Tsutomu Miyazawa, and music composed by Yasuharu Takanashi.

The main theme song for the series is "Proud Stars" by Konomi Suzuki.

== Episode list ==
No. overall	No. in season	Title	Original release date
50	1	"The Return"; Transliteration: "Kikan" (Japanese: 帰還)	May 17, 2022
51	2	"Jofukuin"; Transliteration: "Jofukuin" (Japanese: 徐福院)	May 24, 2022
52	3	"Melody"; Transliteration: "Senritsu" (Japanese: 旋律)	May 31, 2022
