= La Blue Girl =

1992 erotic anime and manga series by Toshio Maeda

- Title card

淫獣学園 La☆Blue Girl (Injū Gakuen La Blue Girl)
- Genre: Hentai
- Manga
- Written by: Toshio Maeda
- Published by: Leed Publishing
- English publisher: NA: Manga 18
- Original run: 1989 – 1992
- Volumes: 6
- Original video animation
- Directed by: Reizou Kitagawa (1); Kan Fukumoto (2–3); Rinjo Yanagikaze (4)
- Produced by: Tarou Miyamae (1); Rusher Ikeda (2); Kento Maki (2–3); Smallie Izumi (4)
- Written by: Wataru Amano (Note: Megumi Ichiyanagi is credited for the screenplay and is one of at least seven pennames of an unknown writer. Wataru Amano is one of those pennames as well, but has the oldest credits and is used the most frequently. For contextual clarity, Amano is listed here.)
- Music by: Teruo Takahama
- Studio: MTV (1); Studio Kikan (2–4)
- Licensed by: NA: Critical Mass Video
- Released: June 26, 1992 – July 9, 1993
- Episodes: 4
- Original video animation

New La Blue Girl
- Directed by: Kan Fukumoto; Rinjo Yanagikaze (2)
- Produced by: Kento Maki; Smallie Izumi
- Written by: Wataru Amano
- Music by: Teruo Takahama
- Studio: Studio Kikan
- Licensed by: NA: Critical Mass Video
- Released: January 28, 1994 – March 25, 1994
- Episodes: 2
- Original video animation

Lady Blue
- Directed by: Kan Fukumoto
- Produced by: Kento Maki; Shumori Izumi
- Written by: Wataru Amano
- Music by: Teruo Takahama
- Studio: Dandelion
- Licensed by: NA: Kitty Media
- Released: July 26, 1996 – November 8, 1996
- Episodes: 4
- Original video animation

La Blue Girl Returns
- Directed by: Hiroshi Ogawa (1); Yoshitaka Fujimoto (2–4)
- Written by: Wataru Amano
- Studio: ARMS
- Licensed by: NA: Kitty Media
- Released: May 25, 2001 – May 25, 2002
- Episodes: 8
- icon

La Blue Girl (淫獣学園 La☆Blue Girl, Injū Gakuen La Blue Girl; roughly "Lewd Beast Academy: The Blue Girl") is an erotic anime and manga series by Toshio Maeda. Like Maeda's other hentai series (e.g., Urotsukidōji), La Blue Girl features a large amount of tentacle rape. It departs somewhat from its predecessors, however, by lightening the atmosphere with humor, lightly parodying the "tentacle hentai" genre.

La Blue Girl has inspired several OVA series for a total of 14 episodes, a comic book adaptation, three live action movies, some PC games, and some art books.

== Story ==
The story involves various ninja clans in a constant state of war with one another. The female protagonist is Miko Mido, a young ninja-in-training and the next leader of the Miroku ninja clan. This clan has control over the Shikima, a perverted race of sex-hungry demons led by Miko's father, the Shikima Lord. However, when thieves steal the magic compact that grants the clan this power, Miko has to fight the Shikima, utilizing her "sexcraft" ninjutsu in order to save the world. The Shikima live in a parallel dimension called the Shikima Realm, and one must perform specific sexual rituals in order to travel there.

== Characters ==
Miko Midō (美童 巫女, Midō Miko)
Voiced by: Omi Minami
Miko is the heroine of all La Blue Girl OVAs and a kunoichi. She is the last descendant of the Miroku kunoichi clan, which has been feuding with the Suzuka clan for many generations. She is often very annoyed at being a sex ninja and having to use her body as a weapon against opponents. Miko can use many unusual sexual techniques, such as hardening her pubic hair into needles and firing them at an opponent, or the 'Nyoninboh' technique which allows her to swell her clitoris to the size of a man's penis and use it to arouse the passions of her female rivals. If strands of her hair are torn out, she can use them as acupuncture needles to stimulate her opponent's erotic pleasure points. Her most powerful attack is the 'Aoi Tatsumaki' (Blue Whirlwind), in which her hair turns into a giant blue tornado that invariably rips away all of her clothing (although most of her clothing is invariably in tatters by the time she employs this climactic tactic anyway). Miko is the daughter of Seikima, the King of the Shikima, and of Maria, the Queen, who is human and a former Miroku woman. As such, Miko is a demon-half-breed and has the blue-colored blood of the Shikima, hence the title La Blue Girl.

Nin-Nin (ニン忍)
Voiced by: Kappei Yamaguchi
Nin-Nin is a dwarf ninja who is always hooded. He is Miko's loyal, yet sexually perverted, companion and sidekick. He likes to peep when Miko is bathing or masturbating and beams with joy whenever he can see her naked, barely dressed, or in any troublesome sexual encounter with demons or other ninja. On the other hand, he takes seriously to heart his role as Miko's protector and always try to help her out whenever she is in trouble, or at least whenever he is not busy taping her "exploits" for future reference.

Fubuki Kai (甲斐 吹雪, Kai Fubuki)
Voiced by: Junko Asami
A self-made ninja, Fubuki Kai sees Miko Mido as her adversary, as she wishes to prove that she is more talented than her, and more worthy of the title of headmaster of the Miroku ninja clan. After she is defeated by Miko in a sexual duel, however, she is adopted by the Shikima and becomes a friend of Miko. When adopted by the Shikima, she metamorphoses into a Shikima, since she desires enough power to equal Miko Mido. She is fond of her new form, but also irritates Miko by being better than her.

Yaku (夜久)
Voiced by: Mai Asakura, Miho Yoshida
Yaku is another ninja of the Miroku clan, whom Miko meets when she decides to travel to the secret Miroku village. She is the only survivor (with Miko) of the Miroku massacre caused by Kamiri and Kugutsumen. Yaku is a powerful—and potentially very threatening—girl, for she shapeshifts into a werewolf unless she reaches an orgasm in time. Her most notable other attributes are her large breasts, of which Miko is envious.

Kamiri
Voiced by: Yumi Takada
Kamiri was at one time the Miroku clan's sexcraft instructor, but she was banished by the clan for treachery because she became the lover of the renegade ninja Kugutsumen. Before being driven away, she was also punished by being raped with a thorny phallus that mangled her vagina. As a result, she swore to take vengeance on the Miroku clan. When Kamiri returns and steals the Miroku treasure, the magical sword Jipang, its evil spirit possesses her and makes her want to conquer the Shikima Realm, kill King Seikima, and rule over it. For that she needs Miko, who is the only one who knows how to get there. After several fights between Kamiri, Miko and Yaku, Kamiri is destroyed by the evil spirit of Jipang.

Kugutsumen
Voiced by: Issei Futamata
A renegade ninja of the Suzuka clan who became the lover of Kamiri, the Miroku sexcraft instructor, after he was able to take control of her when a drop of his semen entered her body during a fight. It was he who killed all the Miroku ninja by mangling their vaginas and causing fatal hemorrhages, mimicking their punishment of his lover. Because of her wounds and her possession by Jipang's evil spirit, Kamiri refuses to have sex with him and so he rapes several young girls. He is a tough opponent for Miko and Yaku, for he often tricks them by disguising himself and so lures them into his traps.

Various Shikima and tentacled monsters
The monsters, who generally have irregular and grotesque shapes, try to make the women reach orgasm, to kill the women, or both, depending on the monsters' various agendas and natures (one poltergeist is depicted in the manga as merging with a kappa in order to heal himself after being defeated by Miko and Nin-Nin and thus get revenge against Miko; the Shikima King is said to be Miko's father, but a Shikima curse leads to her being violated anyhow, as two examples).

Miyu Mido (美童 美夕, Midō Miyu)
Voiced by: Misei Asaoka, Takako Honda
An older sister of Miko and a drama actress, she was kidnapped by the demons from the Shikima World and was rescued by her sister. It is revealed that Miyu was not born of a Shikima but of a human, born through the joining of a member of the Suzuka clan; this disqualified Maria of holding the title of chief of the Miroku clan and, thus, she was driven away, while Miko was given to her grandmother for a proper raising and training.

Kanako (香菜子)
Introduced in the third episode of La Blue Girl Returns, Kanako is a student at a nursing college. Before her grandmother died, she had trained Kanako in the carnal arts in order to offer her services to Miko Mido and the Miroku clan. It then became her dream to be summoned by Miko, and she developed a crush on her. She got in touch with the other main characters through a website posted by Fubuki in their search for more members of the Miroku clan.

Kochō (胡蝶)
The leader of the Mahoroba clan.

Rokuga
Another member of the Mahoroba clan. Posing as Miyu's new boyfriend, he succeeds in stealing the Shikima seal case.

Ruri (瑠璃)
Miko's classmate.

Maho (真帆)
Ruri's brother, introduced in the third episode. It is love at first sight between him and Miko, but she continually dreams of him wearing a strange outfit, a hint that they were lovers in the past.

== Original video animation (OVA) ==
=== La Blue Girl ===
Injū Gakuen / La Blue Girl (four episodes, 1992–93) is an adaptation of the original manga. Miko Mido is a teenage girl who is to be the next leader of the ancestral Miroku ninja clan. But the Suzuka clan steals the treasured compact that symbolizes the truce between the Miroku and the Shikima, a race of perverted otherworldly demons, and soon Miko has to use the sexual techniques of the Miroku to survive the assaults of the demons and protect her sister. After learning the truth behind her heritage and the identity of her true parents, she embarks on a journey to become a real Miroku ninja and would have to fight an ex-mistress-turned-traitor of the Miroku clan.

Title	VHS #	LaserDisc #	DVD #
La Blue Girl 1 (淫獣学園 La☆Blue Girl, Injuu Gakuen La Blue Girl)	SIH-1015	SWLD-3007	TKBA-5008
La Blue Girl 2 (淫獣学園2 La☆Blue Girl, Injuu Gakuen 2 La Blue Girl)	SIH-1016	SWLD-3009	TKBA-5008
La Blue Girl 3 (淫獣学園3 La☆Blue Girl 色魔殺界の章, Injuu Gakuen 3 La Blue Girl Shikima sakkai no shou)	SIH-1031	SWLD-4001	TKBA-5009
La Blue Girl 4 (淫獣学園4 La☆Blue Girl 妖刀淫界の章, Injuu Gakuen 4 La Blue Girl Youtou inkai no shou)	SIH-1032	SWLD-4002	TKBA-5009

=== New La Blue Girl ===
Shin Injū Gakuen / New La Blue Girl (two episodes, 1993) adapts the end of the manga, and as such is a follow-up and the conclusion to Miko's adventures in the first series. This time the enemies are Fubuki Kai, a rogue ninja who wants to defeat Miko and claim the title of best ninja, and the cybernetized survivors of the Suzuka clan.

Title	VHS #	LaserDisc #	DVD #
La Blue Girl 5 (真･淫獣学園1 La☆Blue Girl, Shin Injuu Gakuen 1 La Blue Girl)	SIH-1036	SWLD-4003	TKBA-5010
La Blue Girl 6 (真･淫獣学園2 La☆Blue Girl 前編, Shin Injuu Gakuen 2 La Blue Girl Zenpen)	SIH-1037	SWLD-4004	TKBA-5010
La Blue Girl 6 (真･淫獣学園2 La☆Blue Girl 後編, Shin Injuu Gakuen 2 La Blue Girl Kouhen)	SIH-1038	SWLD-4004	TKBA-5010

La Blue Girl 6 was initially released on VHS in two 30-minute long semi-episodes, while later releases (including the licensed English one) combine them into an hour long episode.

=== Lady Blue ===
Injuu Gakuen EX (淫獣学園EX) a.k.a. Lady Blue (four episodes, 1994). Features an original story about two ghosts, Kyoshiro and Shanahime, harboring an old grudge against the Shikima and attacking several of Miko's friends, including her first love.

Title	VHS #	LaserDisc #	DVD #
The First Love of the Shikima (淫獣学園EX 1 初恋裏色魔篇, Injuu gakuen EX 1: Hatsukoi uchi shikima hen)	SIH-1069	DLZ-0197	
The Curse of the Mysterious Love (淫獣学園EX 2 妖恋呪縛篇, Injuu gakuen EX 2: Youren jubaku hen)	SIH-1073	DLZ-0198	
The Hell of the Cursed Love (淫獣学園EX 3 邪恋地獄篇, Injuu gakuen EX 3: Yaren jigoku hen)	SIH-1075	DLZ-0199	
The Reincarnation of Sad Love (淫獣学園EX 4 哀恋輪廻篇, Injuu gakuen EX 4: Airen rinne hen)	SIH-1077	DLZ-0200	

Lady Blue is about Miko's first love. Miko meets a young man named Hidemasa outside her apartment building and falls in love at first sight. Just when Miko thinks she can finally live like a normal girl and enjoy being in love, a mysterious female phantom appears in her school, sucking the life out of Miko's pretty young schoolmates. Fubuki reports that something is very wrong in the Shikima realm. Miko's parents are being tortured by the sound of flutes playing and no one knows why.

Miko and Fubuki investigate and find out that there is actually a love story behind it all, for the flutes belonged to a betrothed couple (Kyoshiro and Shanahime) 400 years ago, but treachery got in the way, so their love was never realized. The flutes are now cursed and Miko's dream guy, Hidemasa, is kidnapped by the vengeful phantom of Shanahime in order to resurrect her Kyoshiro.

==== Compilation episodes ====
The first was a 90-minute compilation video of the first 4 episodes titled 'Climax Taizen', a 60-minute compilation video of the 'Shin' series titled 'Ecstasy Taizen' and a 60-minute compilation video of the 'EX' series.

Title	VHS #	LaserDisc #	DVD #
Injuu Gakuen Climax Taizen (淫獣学園 クライマックス大全)	SIH-1033/HTH-1174	SWLD-4005	TKBU-5129
Injuu Gakuen Ecstasy Taizen (真・淫獣学園 エクスタシー大全)	SIH-1043/HTH-1269	SWLD-4005	TKBU-5130
Injuu Gakuen EX La Blue Girl Erotic Taizen (淫獣学園EX La☆Blue Girl エロティック大全)	SIH-1078		

Included in the 'Injuu Gakuen La☆Blue Girl Memorial Collection' LD-Box set.

=== La Blue Girl Returns ===
La Blue Girl Returns DVD cover

Injuu Gakuen Fukkatsu-hen (淫獣学園 復活篇, Injuu Gakuen Fukkatsu-hen) a.k.a. La Blue Girl Returns (four episodes, 2001) is an anime series that continues the adventures of Miko Mido. Another original story, this time about the legendary Shikima Brain, a place rumored to bring total power over the universe. It is coveted by the insectoid ninja clan of the Mahoroba and protected by a mysterious clan, who may have a relation with Miko's previous life.

The plot begins when a race of butterfly-like demons named the Mahoroba want to enslave Miko Mido and her sister to steal the seal case that controls the Shikima. Their ultimate goal is to conquer the Shikima Brain, a legendary place of the Shikima realm which is said to confer the power to rule the universe.

Title	VHS #	DVD #
Demon Seed 1 (淫獣学園 La☆Blue Girl 復活篇 第一章, Injuu Gakuen La Blue Girl Dai-ishou)	GBVH-1014	GBBH-1014
Demon Seed 2 (淫獣学園 La☆Blue Girl 復活篇 第二章, Injuu Gakuen La Blue Girl Dai-nishou)	GBVH-1015	GBBH-1015
Shikima Lust 1 (淫獣学園 La☆Blue Girl 復活篇 第三章, Injuu Gakuen La Blue Girl Dai-sanshou)	GBVH-1026	GBBH-1026
Shikima Lust 2 (淫獣学園 La☆Blue Girl 復活篇 第四章, Injuu Gakuen La Blue Girl Dai-yonshou)	GBVH-1027	GBBH-1027

=== Censorship issues ===
Censorship is practiced differently both in Japan and in the U.S. due to their different laws: Japanese law technically discourages showing of genital hair or explicit genitalia, while the United States is more concerned about forbidding the display of sexual acts involving people under 18. Hence, there are censoring mosaics in Japan and scene removals and different ages of characters in the U.S.

While not featuring the censoring mosaics of the original Japanese version, the U.S. release of La Blue Girl was edited during the initial VHS release and all scenes featuring Miko's companion Nin-Nin engaged in a sexual act were removed, probably to avoid the charge of hebephilia.

For similar reasons, the age of the heroine was also altered: initially stated to be a 16-year-old high-schooler in the original Japanese version, she is an 18-year-old college student in the U.S. version. The various U.S. DVD releases contain this edited version.

In the U.K., the British Board of Film Classification refused to give it a certificate; meaning it was banned from release in the region.

== Live action movies ==
- Injū Gakuen: Shikima-kai no gyakushū (Revenge of the Sex Demon King) (1994)
- Injū Gakuen 2: Mashō no hime tanjō jissha-hen (Birth of the Demon Child) (1996)
- Injū Gakuen 3: Kunoichi-gari (Lady Ninja) (1996)

== Printed material ==
- La Blue Girl, Toshio Maeda's manga of six volumes.
- La Blue Girl, a U.S. comic book by Matt Lunsford and José Calderon. It has the distinction of retelling the two distinctly separate story arcs of the first four episodes of the first anime series by merging them together, albeit with story changes to the plots of episodes 2 to 4. Whereas the final chapter of Toshio Maeda's manga established Nin-Nin to be a series of young Shikima demons who passed memories between each other and transformed into an adult form, the U.S. series changed his backstory to being the product of his human mother's rape by a Shikima, that she died giving birth to him, and that his dual heritage resulted in his deformed face, which is shown unmasked.
- The Graffiti book, a compilation of screenshots from episodes 1 to 4.
- The In no Shou and You no Shou art books contain screenshots and illustrations from La Blue Girl and Lady Blue.
- The Art Book of Injuu Gakuen / Youjuu Kyoushitu contains CG illustrations from the PC98 game.
- Rin Shin's art book contains illustrations used for the promotion of the series.
- A novelization of the OVA series (two volumes for episodes 1–5, and two volumes for the EX series) features a completely different plot, different characters (most notably the Ranmaru-Bosatsu duo) and a more sexualized and violent tone than the original.

== Video games ==
- La Blue Girl for PC-98 and FM Towns, with a different character design from the manga and the anime. The story is an adaptation of both the first volume of the manga and OVA: Miko's friends at school are assaulted by demons and her professor is kidnapped and sent to their infernal dimension; Miko travels there and saves her; everyone goes back to Earth, where a final showdown is awaiting Miko at school. Gameplay-wise, it is a "digital comics" adventure game with some shooting phases (in a Snatcher fashion, and with shuriken instead of a pistol).
- La Blue Girl for Windows 95. The art is more faithful to the anime character design, while the story is an adaptation of the La Blue Girl EX OVA.

== Notes ==
=== Citations ===
- Harada, Nobuyoshi; Murasue, Jirou, eds. (1999). 淫獣学園 La☆Blue Girl ～陽の章～ [Injuu Gakuen La Blue Girl ~You no Shou~] (in Japanese). Soryusha. ISBN 4-88386-010-8.
