= Ultramarine Magmell =

Chinese manhua series written and illustrated by Dainenbyo

- First Japanese volume cover

ch: 拾又之国 jp: 群青のマグメル
- Genre: Adventure, fantasy
- Manhua
- Author: Dainenbyo
- Published by: Fanfan Dongman
- Magazine: Fan Manhua
- Original run: September 2014 – present
- Volumes: 8 (List of volumes)
- Anime television series
- Directed by: Hayato Date
- Written by: Chūji Mikasano
- Music by: Yasuharu Takanashi
- Studio: Studio Signpost
- Licensed by: Netflix
- Original network: Tokyo MX, BS Fuji
- Original run: April 7, 2019 – June 30, 2019
- Episodes: 13

Ultramarine Magmell (Note: Chinese: 拾又之国, pinyin Shí Yòu Zhī Guó; Japanese: 群青のマグメル, Hepburn: Gunjō no Magumeru) is a Chinese manhua series written and illustrated by Dainenbyo (Chinese: 第年秒/Dìniánmiǎo). A Japanese anime television series adaptation by Studio Signpost (formerly known as Pierrot+) aired from April 7 to June 30, 2019.

== Plot ==
The story is set in a world where a mysterious new continent, known as Magmell (or Shengzhou), suddenly emerges in the Pacific Ocean. The land is full of unknown species, dangerous environments, and valuable resources, drawing explorers from around the globe despite the risks. Due to a unique magnetic field that disrupts advanced technology, expeditions must rely on physical skill and endurance rather than modern tools.

The story follows Inyō, a skilled "Gleaner" or rescuer who specializes in retrieving explorers stranded or lost within Magmell. Accompanied by his assistant Zero, Inyō takes on missions to locate missing individuals, often venturing deep into hazardous regions filled with unpredictable wildlife.

== Characters ==
Inyō (因又)
Voiced by: Kengo Kawanishi (Japanese); Griffin Puatu (English)
Zero (ゼロ)
Voiced by: M.A.O (Japanese); Erika Harlacher (English)
Emilia (エミリア)
Voiced by: Hibiku Yamamura (Japanese); Cristina Vee (English)
Shūin (拾因)
Voiced by: Toshiyuki Morikawa (Japanese); Kaiji Tang (English)

== Media ==
=== Manhua ===
Dainenbyo launched the manhua on Fanfan Dongman's Fan Manhua website. Later the series was licensed and translated in Japan on Shueisha's shōnen manga app Shōnen Jump+ in June 2015 under the name Gunjō no Magmell. Eight volumes have been published to date.

No.	Japanese release date	Japanese ISBN
1	November 4, 2015	978-4-08-880559-7
2	December 4, 2015	978-4-08-880560-3
3	June 3, 2016	978-4-08-880724-9
4	July 4, 2017	978-4-08-881246-5
5	March 4, 2019	—
6	March 4, 2019	—
7	April 4, 2019	—
8	April 4, 2019	—

=== Anime ===
An anime television series adaptation was announced on April 29, 2018. The series is directed by Hayato Date and written by Chūji Mikasano, with animation by Pierrot+. The series' music is composed by Yasuharu Takanashi. It aired from April 7 to June 30, 2019, on Tokyo MX and BS Fuji. Fudanjuku performed the series' opening theme song "Dash&Daaash!!", while A Flood of Circle performed the ending theme song "The Key". Netflix streamed the series on October 10, 2019.

No.	Title	Original release date
1	"Angler"; Transliteration: "Angurā" (Japanese: 拾人者(アングラー))	April 7, 2019
2	"The Ruler of the 7th Zone"; Transliteration: "Nana-ku no Shihaisha" (Japanese: 7区の支配者)	April 14, 2019
3	"The Seven Colored Dove"; Transliteration: "Nanairo Bato" (Japanese: 七彩鳩)	April 21, 2019
4	"Bloody Maria"; Transliteration: "Chinurareta Maria" (Japanese: 血塗られたマリア)	April 28, 2019
5	"Uncle Den-Den and Magmell"; Transliteration: "Den-Den Oyaji to Magumeru" (Japanese: 田伝おやじとマグメル)	May 5, 2019
6	"Shuin's Pupil"; Transliteration: "Shūin no Hitomi" (Japanese: 拾因の眸)	May 12, 2019
7	"Aboriginal"; Transliteration: "Erin" (Japanese: 原住者(エリン))	May 19, 2019
8	"The Old Man and Fields of Coffee"; Transliteration: "Rōjin to Kōhī Batake" (Japanese: 老人と珈琲畑)	May 26, 2019
9	"Zero's Great Adventure"; Transliteration: "Zero no Dai Bōken" (Japanese: ゼロの大冒険)	June 2, 2019
10	"Monster Mania"; Transliteration: "Monsutā Mania" (Japanese: モンスターマニア)	June 9, 2019
11	"Captured Zero"; Transliteration: "Toraware no Zero" (Japanese: 囚われのゼロ)	June 16, 2019
12	"Despair"; Transliteration: "Zetsubō" (Japanese: 絶望)	June 23, 2019
13	"Someday, Together..."; Transliteration: "Itsuka, Futari de..." (Japanese: いつか二人で…)	June 30, 2019

== Name origin ==
The name Magmell likely comes from Mag Mell, one of the names for the Celtic Otherworld.
