= Magical Girl Ore =

Japanese manga and anime series

- Cover of Magical Girl Ore volume 1 by Fusion Product

魔法少女俺 (Mahō Shōjo Ore)
- Genre: Fantasy, magical girl, gender bender
- Manga
- Written by: Icchokusen Mōkon
- Published by: Fusion Product
- Magazine: Comic Be
- Original run: 2012 – 2014
- Volumes: 2
- Anime television series
- Directed by: Itsuro Kawasaki
- Produced by: Genco
- Written by: Itsuro Kawasaki
- Music by: Takeshi Nekatsuka
- Studio: Pierrot+
- Licensed by: Crunchyroll (streaming); NA: Discotek Media (home video)
- Original network: AT-X, Tokyo MX
- Original run: April 2, 2018 – June 18, 2018
- Episodes: 12
- icon

Magical Girl Ore (魔法少女俺, Mahō Shōjo Ore; "Magical Girl Me (masculine)") is a Japanese manga series written and illustrated by Icchokusen Mōkon. It began serialization in Fusion Product's Comic Be magazine in 2012, and was collected in two tankōbon volumes. The series was renewed for serialization in the same magazine in 2014. A 12-episode anime television series adaptation animated by Pierrot+ aired from April 2 to June 18, 2018.

== Plot ==
An unpopular pop idol and middle high school student Saki Uno discovers that her mother, Sayori, used to be a "magical girl", but, as a result of back problems, found it necessary to pass her position down to Saki. With the help of a yakuza-like mascot character named Kokoro-chan, Saki is able to transform into "Magical Girl Ore" to fight the cute-faced demons who threaten to kidnap her crush, Mohiro. Unfortunately, her magical girl form is that of a large, healthy, athletic, muscular man in a small, cute, girlish uniform, which is causing endless embarrassment to Saki. The situation becomes even more complicated when Mohiro becomes attracted to Saki's manly "Ore" form, and Saki's idol partner Sakuyo reveals her own attraction to Saki.

== Characters ==
Saki Uno (卯野 さき, Uno Saki) / Magical Girl Ore (魔法少女オレ, Mahōshōjo Ore)
Voiced by: Ayaka Ōhashi (before transformation, female), Kaito Ishikawa (after transformation, male)
The main protagonist of story and the singer of the pop idol duo "Magical Twin", which has yet to have any real success. She transforms into "Magical Girl Ore" to save her crush Mohiro from being kidnapped by demons.
Sakuyo Mikage (御翔 桜世, Mikage Sakuyo) / Magical Girl Sakigasuki (魔法少女サキガスキ, Mahōshōjo Sakigasuki)
Voiced by: Sachika Misawa (before transformation, female), Wataru Hatano (after transformation, male)
Saki's best friend and co-singer in Magical Twin. She also has the ability to transform into a magical girl to protect her crush, Saki. Her magical girl name is derived from Saki ga suki (さきが好き, "I love Saki"). Her appearance and character are so similar to the brother's that her male form looks like a more developed Mohiro.
Sayori Uno (卯野 さより, Uno Sayori) / Magical Milf Sayo-chin (魔法熟女さよちん, Mahōjukujo Sayo-chin)
Voiced by: Aya Hisakawa (before transformation, female), Kenjiro Tsuda (after transformation, male)
Saki's mother who is actually was a magical girl.
Mohiro Mikage (御翔 桃拾, Mikage Mohiro)
Voiced by: Toshiyuki Toyonaga
Popular idol singer and Sakuyo's brother who rarely seems to speak or emote outside of his concerts. It seems that he really is attracted to Saki's male form, which constantly confuses her.
Hyoue (兵衛, Hyōe)
Voiced by: Kōji Yusa
Co-star and singer in Mohiro's group.
Konami Yamo (矢茂 小波, Yamo Konami)
Voiced by: Showtaro Morikubo
The manager of Saki and Sakuyo, who reveals himself to be an avid magical girl fan.
Kokoro-chan (ココロちゃん, Kokoro-chan)
Voiced by: Kazuya Ichijō
The magical fairy and "mascot character" to the magical girls, even though he looks and speaks like a stereotypical yakuza. He can appear almost anywhere to assist the magical girls, and provide them with different kinds of "magical" weaponry.
Ichigou Fujimoto (藤本 一郷, Fujimoto Ichigō)
Voiced by: Megumi Ogata
A self-proclaimed cyborg hero with a tragic backstory who is annoyed that magical girls don't have one. His powers include "rapidly pedaling a bicycle" and "quickly changing clothes", along with a laser-firing belt that has no tangible effects. Fujimoto also claims to be from a poor family of similar cyborgs, and has met Saki's mother in magical girl form in the past.
Michiru Ogawa (王川 未散, Ōgawa Michiru) / Magical Girl Eternal Dangerous Pretty (魔法少女エターナルデンジャラスプリティ, Mahō Shōjo Etānaru Denjarasu Puriti)
Voiced by: Yukari Tamura (before transformation, female), Kishō Taniyama (after transformation, male)
Anime-only magical girl, who sings in idol duo together with her partner Ruka. She is a tsundere and often unsuccessfully trying to hide her true feelings, which only strengthens Ruka's attraction to her.
Ruka Kiryu (桐生 瑠可, Kiryū Ruka) / Magical Girl Everything Crazy Beauty (魔法少女エブリシングクレイジービューティー, Mahō Shōjo Eburishingu Kureijī Byūtī)
Voiced by: Yumi Uchiyama (before transformation, female), Tatsuhisa Suzuki (after transformation, male)
Anime-only magical girl, who is unambiguously in love with her partner Michiru from the idol duo, thanks to which she immediately becomes capable of transformation.
Happy (ハッピー, Happī)
Voiced by: Yū Hayashi
Anime-only mascot, who admires Kokoro and will do anything to gain his attention.

== Media ==
=== Anime ===
A 12-episode anime television series adaptation by Pierrot+ aired from April 2 to June 18, 2018. Crunchyroll co-produced and streamed the series worldwide, except in Japan and Greater China. The opening theme is "Noisy Love Power", performed by Ayaka Ōhashi and the ending theme is "Garasu no Ginga" (硝子の銀河, lit. 'Glass Galaxy'), performed by Star Prince, a group composed of the voice actors Toshiyuki Toyonaga and Kōji Yusa. Discotek Media released the series on home video.

==== Episode list ====
No.	Title (Note: All English episode titles are taken from Crunchyroll.)	Original air date
1	"Magical Girl - Transform"; Transliteration: "Mahō Shōjo ☆ Henshin" (Japanese: 魔法少女☆変身)	April 2, 2018
After waking up from a dream about being a magical girl, Saki Uno races to her big public performance as part of the new pop idol duo Magical Twin, only to notice that literally no one is there in the audience. After catching a preview of the new album from Mohiro's group, Saki goes home to see a violent yakuza man banging on her front door. After letting him inside, Saki's mother Sayori reveals that she was a real Magical Girl until recently, when she injured her back, and that the yakuza man is actually her magical mascot character, Kokoro. While her mother asks her to carry on the Magical Girl business, Saki refuses at first, until she sees footage of Mohiro being kidnapped by muscular demons with cute faces. Saki races to a nearby park as the demons begin transporting Mohiro to another dimension. At Kokoro's urging, Saki shouts the name of the one she loves, Mohiro, and transforms into a Magical Girl. Though she stops the demons from kidnapping Mohiro, Saki is shocked to find her Magical Girl form as a large, healthy, athletic, muscular man.
2	"Magical Girl - Ore"; Transliteration: "Mahō Shōjo ☆ Ore" (Japanese: 魔法少女☆オレ)	April 9, 2018
After dealing with the initial shock of her transformation, Saki destroys the demons using surprisingly lethal magical weaponry that Kokoro carries with him. Saki tries to think of a new Magical Girl name but keeps using "Ore" while letting Mohiro go. As Saki returns home, she's shocked to find that Sakuyo and their idol manager saw the whole thing. The next day, Saki tries to work up the courage to tell Mohiro her true feelings, but is interrupted by his partner Hyoue. Later, Kokoro is informed that Mohiro has been kidnapped again by similar demons. Saki goes to rescue him as Ore, only to be restrained by a demon with tentacles. Saki's friend Sakuyo tries to free her and shouts Saki's name, transforming into a similar form of Magical Girl.
3	"Magical Girl - Another"; Transliteration: "Mahō Shōjo ☆ Fueta" (Japanese: 魔法少女☆増えた)	April 16, 2018
Sakuyo rescues Saki after transforming into her own Magical Girl form. Sakuyo begins a lengthy flashback about the time she first fell in love with Saki, as the two of them and Mohiro got into singing when they were younger. One day the girls got lost in a forest, until Mohiro managed to find them. After the incident, Sakuyo fell in love with Saki, and Saki fell in love with Mohiro. Back in the present, Sakuyo destroys the demon and tells Saki that she becomes more powerful when Saki's in danger, and loves her regardless of her form. Suddenly, the girls' idol manager appears to announce his new publicity campaign using their Magical Girl forms. Later, Sakuyo contemplates the size of her Magical Girl form compared to that of her brother. Elsewhere, a masked man is enraged at the news of the Magical Girl idol group.
4	"Magical Girl - Versus Cyborg"; Transliteration: "Mahō Shōjo ☆ Tai Kaizō Ningen" (Japanese: 魔法少女☆対改造人間)	April 23, 2018
As Saki and Sakuyo prepare for their TV debut in their Magical Girl forms, Saki notices the masked man clinging to Mohiro, interrupting their moment together. The Magical Girls track down Fujimoto to a darkened room, where he claims to be a cyborg. Fujimoto then reveals his tragic backstory and is annoyed at the Magical Girls for not having one. Suddenly, demons attack the studio as the Magical Girls and Fujimoto race to be the first to deal with them. After a bloody battle, Kokoro reveals to Saki that her "magical staff" has been collecting the blood of demons that she's killed. As Fujimoto accidentally brings down a pillar on himself, Saki ends up saving him. In return, Fujimoto tells Saki that her Magical Girl form looks similar to her mother's. Mohiro publicly expresses his thanks to Saki as the reporters shove microphones in their face. Afterwards, a short documentary about Fujimoto shows him stopping a robber and returning home to his family of similar-looking cyborgs.
5	"Magical Girl - On Vacation"; Transliteration: "Mahō Shōjo ☆ Ryokō-chū" (Japanese: 魔法少女☆旅行中)	April 30, 2018
While Saki and Sakuyo are on a field trip, Suginami, the centre of Japanese animation industry, faces destruction by a Godzilla-like monster.
6	"Magical Girl - Hot Springs Business"; Transliteration: "Mahō Shōjo ☆ Onsen Eigyō" (Japanese: 魔法少女☆温泉営業)	May 7, 2018
7	"Magical Girl - Lesson"; Transliteration: "Mahō Shōjo ☆ Ressun" (Japanese: 魔法少女☆レッスン)	May 14, 2018
8	"Magical Girl - Meet and Greet"; Transliteration: "Mahō Shōjo ☆ Akushu Kai" (Japanese: 魔法少女☆握手会)	May 21, 2018
9	"Magical Girl - Another and Another"; Transliteration: "Mahō Shōjo ☆ Mata Fueta" (Japanese: 魔法少女☆また増えた)	May 28, 2018
10	"Magical Girl - Stalking"; Transliteration: "Mahō Shōjo ☆ Mata Fueta" (Japanese: 魔法少女☆また増えた)	June 4, 2018
With Saki and Sakuyo's previous investigation interrupted, they continue following their previous suspect believed to be the Demon King.
11	"Magical Girl - Final Battle"; Transliteration: "Mahō Shōjo ☆ Saishū Kessen" (Japanese: 魔法少女☆最終決戦)	June 11, 2018
12	"Magical Girl - Watashi"; Transliteration: "Mahō Shōjo ☆ Watashi" (Japanese: 魔法少女☆私)	June 18, 2018
