= Venus 5 =

1994 original video animation

- Sailor Senshi Venus Five
- Cover from the English-language DVD release by Central Park Media

セーラー戦士 ヴィーナス・ファイブ
- Genre: Erotic comedy, magical girl, parody
- Original video animation
- Directed by: Osamu Inoue (1); Kan Fukumoto (2)
- Produced by: Smallie Izumi; Kento Maki
- Written by: Wataru Amano
- Music by: Teruo Takahama
- Studio: Dandelion
- Licensed by: NA: Anime18
- Released: November 11, 1994 – December 9, 1994
- Episodes: 2

Venus 5 (セーラー戦士·ビーナス·ファイブ, Sailor Senshi Venus Five) is a Japanese adult anime two-part series about five schoolgirls with supernatural powers who must defend the Earth from the evil Inma Empire and their leader, Necros. It is a pornographic parody or rip-off of the Sailor Moon series, mostly in regards to the heroines and heroes. Venus 5 is created by Jin Ara.

The title was created and produced in Japan in 1994 and released in North America by Central Park Media's Anime 18 imprint. It is directed by Osamu Inoue and written by Wataru Amano (screenplay) and Jin Ara (creator). There are only two parts to the series: The first is "The Inma Ball" and the sequel is "Labyrinth of the Inma".

== Overview ==
The basic premise is that the Greek Goddess Aphrodite has secretly recruited 5 schoolgirls on earth to be her Venus Warriors. They are bestowed supernatural powers whenever they transform. There is Venus Pink, Venus Blue, Venus Green, Venus Red, and Venus Purple. They will be earth's only defense against a perverted force known as the Inma Empire. The leader of the Inma Empire is Necros, daughter of the Greek God Apollo (who in this series is the God of Lust). The Inma seek to resurrect Apollo and dominate the world, turning it into a perverted sexual empire.

Hikari is Venus Pink, also the leader of the Venus 5. At the beginning of the story, she learns of her destiny from a talking cat named Buccha. He is a servant of Aphrodite and is sent to earth to aid and instruct the Venus 5. Unfortunately, the girls do not know that they have been selected to be Venus Warriors, and Buccha must find them and inform them of their secret identities. Every Venus warrior has a secret Venus mark on her body, a symbol that marks them as one of the Venus 5.

The series is predominated by strong sexual themes, nudity, and gratuitous sex, but has mild violence.

== Characters ==
=== Venus team ===
- Hikari Misono / Venus Pink (Voiced by: Junko Asami (Japanese); Alannah Molloy (English)): A natural blonde Japanese student of Golden Star Academy. She has good judgement and is friendly, though she also has a bit of a mean streak. She has a pink Venus mark on her stomach.
- Kiyomi Mikawa / Venus Blue (Voiced by: Yumi Fukami (Japanese); Judith Lynn (English)): Hikari's best friend. Quickly labeled a 'brain' due to her looks and modest personality. She has a blue Venus mark on her right breast.
- Ikumi Mihara / Venus Green (Voiced by: Fumika Kudō (Japanese); Jen Alexander (English)): Recently enrolled at Golden Star, Ikumi is soft-spoken and kind hearted, but has a tough side due to her involvement in a gang from her previous school. She has a green Venus mark on her left thigh.
- Moyu Miyama / Venus Red (Voiced by: Rie Iwatsubo (Japanese); Jody Lee (English)): A fairly snobby rich girl who attends Golden Star, but she lightens up once she gets acquainted by the rest of the Venus team. She has a red Venus mark on her buttocks.
- Ai Misora / Venus Purple (Voiced by: Junko Sakuma (Japanese); Lisa Braverman (English)): Local young movie actress who attends Golden Star. She was the only member of the Venus 5 to be discovered by the Inma Empire in 'Inma Ball'. She has the dirtiest mind of the Venus 5 as she is a closet masochist. She has a purple Venus mark on her back.
- Buccha (Voiced by: Kenichi Ogata (Japanese); Jack Altwarg (English)): Somewhat perverted, but otherwise dutiful feline lackey of Aphrodite assigned to gather and train the Venus 5.
- Aphrodite (Voiced by: Masami Toyoshima (Japanese); Nadine Hart (English)): Greek goddess who is intent on saving Earth from the clutches of the Inma Empire with the Venus 5's help, though she's very snobby.
- Ken Kanagawa / Apollo Junior (Voiced by: Unknown (Japanese); Richard Nagel (English)): A mysterious student at Golden Star who is at first shady and suspicious to the Venus 5. Later in Labyrinth of the Inma, Buccha reveals him to be Aphrodite's younger brother.

=== The Inma Lords ===
- Empress Necros / Dean Narumi (Voiced by: Yumi Takada (Japanese); Lauren Patrice (English)): Perverted ruler of the Inma Empire who is partly futanari. She assumes the disguise of Golden Star's dean.
- Marquis Saturn / Hiroto Tsuchiya (Voiced by: Daiki Nakamura (Japanese); Lance Cosgrove (English)): Duke of the Inma Empire who often acts as its omni-man. He assumes the disguise of the school's top English teacher.
- Count Uranus / Yoshihiro Amano (Voiced by: Takehiro Murozono (Japanese); Kevin Driscoll (English)): Count of the Inma Empire who features a snake-like twin that protrudes from his stomach and almost always commands the Empire's goblin-like scouts. He assumes the disguise of the school's top math teacher.
- Viscount Neptune / Hiroshi Umino (Voiced by: Hiroshi Yanaka (Japanese); George Trahanis (English)): Viscount of the Inma Empire who has a strong sense of smell and is the only Inma lord with a second face on his stomach and tentacles, though he never uses them. He assumes the role of the school's top biology teacher.
- Baron Pluto / Hideki Meino (Voiced by: Kunihiko Yasui (Japanese); Roland Dehay (English)): Baron of the Inma Empire who also sports a serpentine twin on his body and has X-ray vision he uses to locate the Venus symbols. He assumes the role of the school's top Physical Education teacher.
- Emperor Nero (Voiced by: Unknown (Japanese); Roland Dehay (English)): Abusive, crabby and eccentric old elf put in charge of watching Apollo's casket, seen only in Labyrinth of the Inma.
