= The Morose Mononokean =

Japanese manga series

- First volume cover

不機嫌なモノノケ庵 (Fukigen na Mononokean)
- Genre: Comedy, supernatural
- Manga
- Written by: Kiri Wazawa
- Published by: Square Enix
- English publisher: NA: Crunchyroll Manga
- Magazine: Gangan Online
- Original run: 12 September 2013 – 8 April 2021
- Volumes: 18
- Anime television series
- Directed by: Akira Iwanaga (season 1); Itsuro Kawasaki (season 2)
- Written by: Takao Yoshioka
- Music by: Yasuharu Takanashi (season 1); Jun Ichikawa (season 2)
- Studio: Pierrot+
- Licensed by: Crunchyroll
- Original network: AT-X, Tokyo MX, ytv, CTV, BS11, SUN, BS Fuji
- Original run: 28 June 2016 – 30 March 2019
- Episodes: 26
- icon

The Morose Mononokean (不機嫌なモノノケ庵, Fukigen na Mononokean; "Morose Spirit Teahouse") is a Japanese manga series written and illustrated by Kiri Wazawa. An anime television series adaptation produced by Pierrot+ aired from June to September 2016. A second season aired from January to March 2019.

== Characters ==
Hanae Ashiya (芦屋 花繪, Ashiya Hanae)
Voiced by: Yūki Kaji (Japanese); Aaron Dismuke (English)
Ashiya is a high school student who was possessed by a fuzzy demon as he is starting his first day of high school which made him extremely ill. He enlists the help of Abeno to exorcise the demon but ends up working for Abeno to pay off his debt. A crybaby but kind-hearted boy, he seems to hold a mysterious power that has yet to be revealed in the manga series.
Haruitsuki Abeno (安倍 晴齋, Abeno Haruitsuki)
Voiced by: Tomoaki Maeno (Japanese); Jason Liebrecht (English)
A first year high school student in the same class as Ashiya. He is the current owner of the Mononokean and rumors around the demon world state he killed the original owner Aoi, though this is false. He can open up two portals a day to the underworld to exorcise demons, but this severely drains him of energy. He is usually shown sleeping in class. He has blond hair and because of his maturity most people are surprised he is a first year high school student. He believes that helping demons is more important than helping humans, as demons are lonely in the Human world where very few humans can see them and because he believes if humans are in trouble they can receive help easily, unlike demons. He is stern and short tempered and a bit rude particularly towards Ashiya but shows a kinder personality as the series progresses. He is polite to his customers. He has begun to loosen up as he becomes friends with Ashiya.
Zenko Fujiwara (藤原 禅子, Fujiwara Zenko)
Voiced by: Ayahi Takagaki (Japanese); Dani Chambers (English)
A 15-year-old girl with a born poker face and who was raised in a temple. She believed her father would not let her inherit the temple because she was a girl but Ashiya helps her realize it was not that, but because her father wanted her to have other options and not feel forced to take over the temple. While she initially could not see demons, after Yahiko bites her she is able to see him and Fuzzy but has a harder time seeing other demons. She is good friends with Ashiya, Abeno and Yahiko.
Fuzzy (モジャモジャ, Moja Moja)
A small adorable fluffy white demon with small stubby legs, three tails, and purple eyes. He is very affectionate towards Ashiya, having been noticed by him and inadvertently cursed him by clinging to him, causing Ashiya to feel nauseous and become gravely ill. He was lonely in the mundane world where no one could see him so he was happy to have Ashiya notice him. He has also been shown to be intelligent and affectionate towards Abeno, and will defend his friends if they are harmed.
Yahiko (ヤヒコ)
Voiced by: Ikue Ōtani (Japanese); Brittany Lauda (English)
A fox demon who was Abeno's friend for eight years ago and who kidnapped him so that they could play with him for three days. He bit Zenko to get Abeno's attention by threatening to burn her arm off but he apologized and now has to serve in her temple for a year as punishment (though he mostly lounges around and does nothing). He is very childish and can turn himself into the form of a small boy and also likes sweets and Abeno (and gets along with Zenko) but does not like Ashiya.
Kora (コウラ, Kōra)
Voiced by: Yōko Hikasa (Japanese); Janelle Lutz (English)
Koura is the demon who runs the Kiyakudo medicine shop in the Underworld with her assistant Shizuku. She has a fascination with humans' body parts as she says she can make great medicine with them. She is also friends with Abeno (who is a regular customer) and the Legislator. She is also extremely kind and loyal to her assistant Shizuku, who is in love with her.
Shizuku (シズク)
Voiced by: Chinami Hashimoto (Japanese); Sarah Wiedenheft (English)
The Legislator's little sister and also Koura's assistant in the medicine shop Kiyakudo which is located the Underworld. She is practicing her magic, so she mostly appears human but retains her newt's tail. She is also in love with her master Koura and is a loyal and hardworking employee.
The Legislator (立法, Rippō)
Voiced by: Junichi Suwabe (Japanese); Jessie James Grelle (English)
The Legislator is one of the three heads of the Underworld (the other two being Justice and the Executive). He sets the rules of the Underworld and is the only one who has the authority to give the Master of the Mononkean Abeno direct orders which he must follow. If a Master of the Mononokean fails to follow an order/rule set by the Legislator he forfeits his position. He was once described by Abeno as a chain-smoking, sex maniac with a gambling problem. The Legislator is also Shizuku's older brother who is apparently in love with her. He carries out his duties from his home on Newt Lake.
Justice (司法, Shihō)
Voiced by: Hiro Shimono (Japanese); Z. Charles Bolton (English)
Executive (行政, Gyōsei)
Voiced by: Koji Yusa (Japanese); Vic Mignogna (season 2 episode 2); Ian Sinclair (season 2 episode 5 onwards) (English)
Kinako (キナコ)
Voiced by: Mika Kanai (Japanese); Kate Bristol (English)
Keshi (ケシ)
Voiced by: Tomoko Kaneda (Japanese); Kayli Mills (English)
Egen (エゲン)
Voiced by: Lynn (Japanese); Meli Grant (English)
Sakae Ashiya (芦屋 榮, Ashiya Sakae)
Voiced by: Akira Ishida (Japanese); Justin Cook (English)
Aoi (アオイ)
Voiced by: Akemi Okamura (Japanese); Elizabeth Maxwell (English)
Norito Saga (のりと 差が, Saga Norito)
Voiced by: Taku Yashiro (Japanese); Orion Pitts (English)
He is a student in Class 1-2 and friends with Hanae Ashiya and Haruitsuki Abeno.

== Media ==
=== Manga ===
Kiri Wazawa launched the series in online Square Enix's Gangan Online magazine in September 2013 and ended in April 2021. The series is published digitally in English by Crunchyroll Manga.

==== Volumes ====
No.	Japanese release date	Japanese ISBN
1	21 June 2014	978-4-7575-4252-5
2	22 September 2014	978-4-7575-4417-8
3	21 February 2015	978-4-7575-4557-1
4	22 May 2015	978-4-7575-4644-8
5	21 November 2015	978-4-7575-4798-8
6	22 June 2016	978-4-7575-5015-5
6.5	22 June 2016	978-4-7575-5016-2
7	21 September 2016	978-4-7575-5089-6
8	27 March 2017	978-4-7575-5278-4
9	22 August 2017	978-4-7575-5443-6
10	22 January 2018	978-4-7575-5589-1
11	22 June 2018	978-4-7575-5750-5
12	21 December 2018	978-4-7575-5949-3
13	22 March 2019	978-4-7575-6054-3
14	12 September 2019	978-4-7575-6284-4
15	12 February 2020	978-4-7575-6501-2
16	11 August 2020	978-4-7575-6796-2
17	12 February 2021	978-4-7575-7092-4
18	12 July 2021	978-4-7575-7367-3

=== Anime ===
A 13-episode anime television series adaptation was announced by Square Enix on 11 February 2016. The series is directed by Akira Iwanaga and written by Takao Yoshioka, with animation by the studio Pierrot Plus. Yasuharu Takanashi composed the music. Character designs for the anime were provided by Atsuko Kageyama. The opening theme song is "Tomodachi Meter" (トモダチメートル; "Friend Meter"), performed by the duo The Super Ball, while the ending theme is "Tobira no Mukō" (扉の向こう; "On the Other Side of the Door") by Tomoaki Maeno and Yūki Kaji. Crunchyroll simulcasted the first season, while Funimation released the series in North America. The series aired between 28 June 2016 to 21 September 2016, and was broadcast on AT-X, Tokyo MX, Yomiuri TV, Chukyo TV, and BS11.

A 13-episode second season was announced, and aired from 5 January 2019 to 30 March 2019. Itsuro Kawasaki replaced Akira Iwanaga as the director, and Mizuki Aoba replaced Atusko Kageyama as the character designer. The cast reprised their roles. The opening theme for the second season is "Long Time Traveller" (ロングタイムトラベラー) by mono palette, while the ending theme is "1%" by Wolpis Kater. Crunchyroll simulcast the second season, while Funimation produced an English dub.

==== Episodes ====
===== Season 1 =====
No.	Title	Original release date
1	"The Beginning"; Transliteration: "Yakushi" (Japanese: 厄始(ヤクシ))	28 June 2016
Hanae Ashiya encounters a small fuzzy yokai that clings to him, but also causes him to run out of energy throughout his first week of high school. In desperation, he calls the number for an exorcist on a hidden flier, and connects with a young man named Haruitsuki Abeno to remove the yokai. Abeno is disappointed, but decides to help him after the beast grows to large proportions. Using a beach ball, Abeno tells Ashiya that the yokai just wanted his attention, and to play with it. Five hours later, the yokai is satisfied and willingly leaves Ashiya alone. Abeno then demands payment for his services, using Ashiya's lack of funds to guilt him into working off the debt as his assistant. The next day in class, Ashiya is shocked to discover that Abeno is his classmate.
2	"The Ant"; Transliteration: "Gigi" (Japanese: 蟻犠(ギギ))	5 July 2016
Ashiya uses his newfound sight to help remove a yokai attached to a classmate, but finds that it was a small part of a larger swarm as they later chase him around the school. The small yokai overpowers Ashiya and takes him to their leader, known only as "Big Boss Scree." Abeno was tasked to help them out by opening a portal to the underworld, letting the Scree swarm go first. Due to the parasite that is stuck to Big Boss, he is unable to go through the doorway. With Ashiya's encouragement, the Big Boss takes a specialised pill that will weaken the parasite. Big Boss Scree survived the extreme, possibly lethal, pain and was separated from the parasite. Alas, it fit through the doorway, reopened by Abeno, and 'exorcised' with the rest of the Scree.
3	"Zenko"; Transliteration: "Zenko" (Japanese: 禅子(ゼンコ))	12 July 2016
Abeno asks Ashiya to complete a task on his own, to retrieve the "laughing" mask of Mitsuchigura from the human world, as it has the power to make anyone laugh uncontrollably. Ashiya lands at a Buddhist shrine, where the priest literally cannot stop laughing while conscious. His daughter, Zenko, finds herself torn between taking care of her father and hating him for not trusting her with the shrine. While Ashiya helps Zenko tend to the shrine's garden, he helps her discover that the priest isn't driving her away out of hatred, but because he wants her to choose her own path in life. While Zenko cries at her father's bedside, Ashiya is able to take off the laughing mask and complete his task.
4	"The Underworld"; Transliteration: "Kakuriyo" (Japanese: 隠世(カクリヨ))	19 July 2016
Abeno informs Ashiya that he won't be available for two days, since he is going to the Underworld to get some medicine. This makes Ashiya curious about the Underworld, and the Mononokean suggests that Abeno takes Ashiya with him. After detailing the rules, Abeno and Ashiya set off to the Underworld, and Ashiya wonders if he will get to meet the small fuzzy yokai (Fuzzy). When they get to the medicine shop, they find out that the medicine intended for Abeno was sold off to Big Boss Scree, and they have to wait for some time before the medicine is prepared newly. The two provide the shop some assistance, and in the meantime, Ashiya gets mistaken for a thief, and gets his hand nearly chopped off before he is rescued by Fuzzy.
5	"The Legislative Lake"; Transliteration: "Hōchi" (Japanese: 法池(ホウチ))	26 July 2016
Fuzzy is hurt during the fight, seeing which Ashiya becomes strange. He returns to normal as soon as Abeno hits him, and it doesn't seem like he changed at all. In the meantime, Koura, the master of the medicine house gets a call from The Legislator (he's the brother of the medicine house master's assistance, Shizuku), who asks her to tell Abeno to bring the new employee to him, and that he will decide on the employment. While on the way to The Legislator, Abeno describes the rulers of the Underworld to Ashiya - there are three rulers - The Justice, The Legislator and The Executive, and that the master of Mononokean answers to no one, but only has to follow the rules set by the Legislator. When they meet, the Legislator tells Ashiya that very few people know that Abeno is a human, including him and Koura. Later, The Legislator agrees to Ashiya becoming the Mononokean's employee and also hires Fuzzy as a yokai employee. He also makes a new rule that the master of the Mononokean and its employees can all travel to the Underworld through the Mononokean. While leaving, The Legislator comments that he now understands why Abeno always refused yokai being employed at the Mononokean - it is because humans cannot be possessed by a parasite shrub.
6	"The Ring"; Transliteration: "Ringu" (Japanese: 輪求(リング))	3 August 2016
A new request is obtained from a yokai named Manjiro, who wants them to find a missing ring from a pair. The rings are wedding rings, belonging to an old lady, who has lost her husband and was wearing both the rings.. but she has lost her own. Ashiya proclaims that he has always been good at finding lost metal things, and finds it within 15 minutes, but then they are stuck with the problem of how to return it to the old lady. Ashiya wants to tell the old lady all about the Manjiro, but they decide against it, since humans never react well to yokai. But when they reach the house, they are caught by the old lady before they mail the ring, and they end up telling her about Manjiro. Even as the old lady invites them for dinner as thanks, Abeno hears someone saying 'Found You!', and we see a footsteps disappearing from the top of the wall behind him.
7	"The Encounter"; Transliteration: "Hōsō" (Japanese: 逢遭(ホウソウ))	10 August 2016
Ashiya and Abeno meet Zenko at school, where she shows them a bite mark on her hand. She tells them that others can't see it, and so it must be from a yokai. She also tells that she has been able to see yokai since. Suddenly a fox yokai appears on Abeno's shoulder. Abeno is shocked since he wasn't able to sense the yokai's presence at all. The yokai calls him 'Haruitsuki' and tells him that he knew him as a child, but might have forgotten. The yokai also tells him that they are to play hide and seek, else the bite he left on Zenko will wither off her hand. Zenko tells the fox to wait till after school at her shrine home, and the three are left playing hide and seek till late, as the fox disappears every time they catch him, asking them to play yet again. Finally, Ashiya manages to catch the tricky fox, and Abeno remember his name - 'Yahiko'. Yahiko tells them that Abeno was an employee of Mononokean when they met, and the master then was named Aoi. Suddenly, Zenko's arm starts hurting, and Yahiko turns into a giant fox, questioning Abeno - 'There's a rumor that you killed Aoi to become the master of Mononokean. It's not true, is it?'
8	"The Wait"; Transliteration: "Mano" (Japanese: 待延(マノ))	17 August 2016
Abeno manages to convince Yahiko that he would never kill Aoi, and that if at all Aoi heard about it, they would laugh while holding his stomach. Yahiko removes the bite mark from Zenko's arm and promises to help her around the shrine for a year as apology. Ashiya meets another yokai, Jomatsu who wants help from the Mononokean to help the princess Anmo, whom he serves. He tells Ashiya about the fickle princess, who falls in love with just about anyone (or anything) and hides herself in an egg, heartbroken. While usually, she comes out the egg soon, this time, she hasn't come out even after a month, instead the egg grows larger. Ashiya agrees to help until Abeno arrives, since Abeno has to listen to the request of another client first. After arriving to where the princess' egg is, Ashiya somehow manages to make her come out of her egg. But instead of becoming a couple with Jomatsu, who is in love with her, she falls in love with Abeno, who has just arrived, creating a new problem for their return to the Underworld.
9	"The Marked Difference"; Transliteration: "Kakudan" (Japanese: 隔段(カクダン))	24 August 2016
10	"The Fool"; Transliteration: "Deku" (Japanese: 木偶(デク))	31 August 2016
11	"The Purple Sun"; Transliteration: "Shiyō" (Japanese: 紫陽(シヨウ))	7 September 2016
12	"The Separation"; Transliteration: "Yūri" (Japanese: 憂離(ユウリ))	14 September 2016
13	"The End"; Transliteration: "Dan'en" (Japanese: 團圓(ダンエン))	21 September 2016

===== Season 2 =====
No.	Title	Original release date
1	"The Limb Screen"; Transliteration: "Esu" (Japanese: 肢簾(エス))	5 January 2019
2	"The Tail"; Transliteration: "Oo" (Japanese: 尾鳴(オオ))	12 January 2019
3	"Greetings"; Transliteration: "Gyōsatsu" (Japanese: 行拶(ギョウサツ))	19 January 2019
4	"The Mortar"; Transliteration: "Usutsuku" (Japanese: 臼舂(ウスツク))	26 January 2019
5	"The Tiger"; Transliteration: "Koi" (Japanese: 虎入(コイ))	2 February 2019
6	"The Seedling"; Transliteration: "Mitsuga" (Japanese: 光芽(ミツガ))	9 February 2019
7	"The Dabbler"; Transliteration: "Yokosuki" (Japanese: 横好(ヨコスキ))	16 February 2019
8	"The Removal"; Transliteration: "Nura" (Japanese: 脱羅(ヌラ))	23 February 2019
9	"The Shadow"; Transliteration: "Eiei" (Japanese: 榮影(エイエイ))	2 March 2019
10	"The Message"; Transliteration: "Kokken" (Japanese: 黒遣(コッケン))	9 March 2019
11	"The Return"; Transliteration: "Kii" (Japanese: 帰居(キイ))	16 March 2019
12	"The Cobweb"; Transliteration: "Jiyōchi" (Japanese: 上蜘(ジヨウチ))	23 March 2019
13	"True Intentions"; Transliteration: "Honne" (Japanese: 翻寧(ホンネ))	30 March 2019

== Reception ==
Gadget Tsūshin listed "melon soda", a phrase from the ending theme, in their 2019 anime buzzwords list.
