= Kiyomu Fukuda =

Japanese anime director

Kiyomu Fukuda 福田 皖
- Born: May 18, 1944 (age 81)
- Other names: Kan Fukumoto (ふくもとかん)
- Occupation(s): Animator, director, character designer
- Years active: 1969–present

Kiyomu Fukuda (福田 皖, Fukuda Kiyomu) is a Japanese director, character designer, and animator associated with Studio Kikan and Arms. He also uses the name Kan Fukumoto (ふくもと かん, Fukumoto Kan) mostly while directing hentai between 1992 and 2005, and occasionally for animation work on more risqué television titles since then. Between 1986 and 1991, he ran his own animation studio, Atelier Fukurou.

== Filmography ==
- La Blue Girl (1992 OVA), Director
- Lady Blue (1994 OVA), Director
- New Angel (1994 OVA), Drawing Continuity (ep 2)
- Twin Angels (1995 OVA), Director
- Mystery of Nonomura Hospital (1996 OVA), Supervision
- Advancer Tina (1997 OVA), Director
- Pia Carrot 2 (1998 OVA), Director
- Teacher's Pet (1999 OVA), Director
- Kakyuusei (1999 TV series), Storyboard (ep 1), Episode Director (ep 7)
- Words Worth (1999 OVA), Director, Storyboard (eps 1, 2, 4, 5)
- First Kiss Story (2000 OVA), Director
- Inma Seiden (2001 OVA), Director
- La Blue Girl Returns (2001 OVA), Supervision
- Class Reunion Again (2002 OVA), Director
- Taboo Charming Mother (2003 OVA), Director (eps 1, 2, 3)
