= Masashi Kudo (animator) =

Japanese animator

- 工藤昌史
- Occupations: Animator, director, character designer
- Known for: Bleach

Masashi Kudo (工藤 昌史, Kudō Masashi) is a Japanese animator. He is best known for his work on the anime television series Bleach.

Kudo was responsible for the design of some minor characters that do not appear in the manga and from the selection of colours for characters which have not been illustrated; this last task is also made in collaboration with the series' creator.

He has also made collaborations on several OVAs and Original net animations, mostly as a character designer or key animator.

== Works ==
=== Animated series ===
- Bleach (2004–2012) – Character Design
- Today's Asuka Show (2012–2013) – Director & Character Design
- Hayate the Combat Butler: Can't Take My Eyes Off You (2012) – Director & Character Design
- Maoyu (2013) – Character Design
- Hayate the Combat Butler: Cuties (2013) – Director & Character Design
- Survival Game Club! (2014) – Character Design & Chief Animation Director
- Re-Kan! (2015) – Director
- Chain Chronicle: The Light of Haecceitas (2017) – Director & Character Design
- Sanrio Boys (2018) – Director
- Tower of God (2020) – Character Design
- Bleach: Thousand Year Blood War (2022) – Character Design
- Terminator Zero (2024) – Director
- Aquarion: Myth of Emotions (2025) – Character Design

=== Animated films ===
- Bleach: Memories of Nobody (2006) – Character Design & Chief Animation Director
- Bleach: The DiamondDust Rebellion (2007) – Character Design
- Bleach: Fade to Black (2008) – Character Design
- Bleach: Hell Verse (2010) – Character Design & Chief Animation Director
- Chain Chronicle: The Light of Haecceitas Part 1 (2016) – Director & Character Design
- Chain Chronicle: The Light of Haecceitas Part 2 (2017) – Director & Character Design
- Chain Chronicle: The Light of Haecceitas Part 3 (2017) – Director & Character Design
- Santa Company: Midsummer Merry Christmas (2021) – Character Design
