= Ikki Tousen =

Japanese manga series

- The first volume of Ikki Tousen released by Wani Books in October 2000 featuring Hakufu Sonsaku

一騎当千 (Ikkitōsen)
- Genre: Martial arts
- Manga
- Written by: Yūji Shiozaki
- Published by: Wani Books
- English publisher: AUS: Madman Entertainment; NA: Tokyopop; UK: Tokyopop
- Magazine: Comic Gum
- Original run: April 26, 2000 – August 26, 2015
- Volumes: 24
Further information
Anime television series
Ikki Tousen: Battle Vixens
Directed by	Takashi Watanabe
Produced by	Nobuhiro Oosawa; Yuuji Matsukura
Written by	Takao Yoshioka
Music by	Hiroshi Motokura; Project IKKI
Studio	J.C.Staff
Licensed by	Crunchyroll (Note: In North America through Crunchyroll, LLC (formerly known as Funimation).); AUS: Madman Entertainment; UK: MVM Entertainment
Original network	AT-X, TVK, MTV, Chiba TV, TV Saitama, SUN
Original run	July 30, 2003 – October 22, 2003
Episodes	13
Anime television series
Ikki Tousen: Dragon Destiny
Directed by	Koichi Ohata
Produced by	Osamu Koshinaka; Shinsaku Tanaka; Takurou Hatakeyama; Keiji Hamada (#1–5); Yoshikazu Beniya (#6–12)
Written by	Takao Yoshioka
Music by	Yasuharu Takanashi
Studio	Arms Corporation
Licensed by	AUS: Madman Entertainment; NA: Anime Works; UK: MVM Films
Original network	AT-X, Chiba TV, KBS Kyoto, TVK, Tokyo MX, SUN, TV Aichi, TV Saitama
Original run	February 26, 2007 – May 14, 2007
Episodes	12
Video game
Ikki Tousen: Shining Dragon
Developer	Idea Factory
Publisher	Marvelous Entertainment
Genre	Fighting
Platform	PlayStation 2
Released	July 26, 2007
Anime television series
Ikki Tousen: Great Guardians
Directed by	Koichi Ohata
Produced by	Hisato Usui; Shinsaku Tanaka; Osamu Koshinaka; Takurou Hatakeyama; Yasuhiro Mikami
Written by	Masanao Akahoshi
Music by	Yasuharu Takanashi
Studio	Arms Corporation
Licensed by	Crunchyroll; AUS: Madman Entertainment; UK: MVM Films
Original network	AT-X, Chiba TV, TV Saitama, TV Aichi, TVK, SUN, Tokyo MX
Original run	June 11, 2008 – August 27, 2008
Episodes	12
Video game
Ikki Tousen: Eloquent Fist
Developer	Tamsoft
Publisher	Marvelous Entertainment
Genre	Fighting
Platform	PlayStation Portable
Released	October 2, 2008
Video game
Ikki Tousen: Xross Impact
Developer	Tamsoft
Publisher	Marvelous Entertainment
Genre	Fighting
Platform	PlayStation Portable
Released	April 28, 2010
Anime television series
Ikki Tousen: Xtreme Xecutor
Directed by	Koichi Ohata
Produced by	Hiromasa Minami; Hisato Usui; Keisuke Kawai; Shinsaku Tanaka; Takurou Hatakeyama
Written by	Koichi Ohata
Music by	Yasuharu Takanashi
Studio	TNK (Note: Animation production assistance (アニメーション制作協力) for all episodes provided by Arms.)
Licensed by	Crunchyroll; AUS: Madman Entertainment; UK: MVM Films
Original network	AT-X, Chiba TV, TVK, TV Saitama, Tokyo MX, TV Aichi, SUN
Original run	March 26, 2010 – June 11, 2010
Episodes	12
Original video animation
Ikki Tousen: Shūgaku Tōshi Keppu-roku
Directed by	Rion Kujo
Produced by	Takurou Hatakeyama; Shinsaku Tanaka; Hisato Usui; Tetsuya Tsuchihashi
Written by	Hideyuki Kurata
Music by	Yasuharu Takanashi
Studio	Arms
Licensed by	Crunchyroll; AUS: Madman Entertainment; UK: MVM Films
Released	November 12, 2011
Runtime	43 minutes
Original video animation
Ikki Tousen: Extravaganza Epoch
Directed by	Masashi Kudou
Produced by	Shinsaku Tanaka; Hisato Usui; Tetsuya Tsuchihashi
Written by	Masahiro Ookubo
Music by	Yasuharu Takanashi
Studio	Arms
Released	December 21, 2014 – December 28, 2014
Runtime	30 minutes
Episodes	2
Manga
Shin Ikki Tousen
Written by	Yuji Shiozaki
Published by	Shōnen Gahōsha
Magazine	Young King OURs; (November 30, 2015 – June 28, 2024); Young King Bull; (August 19, 2024 – present)
Original run	November 30, 2015 – present
Volumes	5
Original video animation
Ikki Tousen: Western Wolves
Directed by	Takashi Watanabe (Note: Chief Director (総監督)); Mitsutoshi Satou
Produced by	Harutaka Ashitate; Yuuichi Izumi; Satoshi Motonaga; Takeaki Hishiyama; Masato Suzuki (1); Emi Kashimura (2–3); Noritomo Isogai (2–3)
Written by	Masaya Honda
Music by	Yasuharu Takanashi
Studio	Arms
Released	January 3, 2019 – February 27, 2019
Runtime	27 minutes
Episodes	3
Anime television series
Shin Ikki Tousen
Directed by	Rion Kujo
Produced by	Noritomo Isogai; Yuuichi Izumi; Osamu Koshinaka; Satoshi Motonaga; Yuushi Ika; Reon Hirano; Takuya Abe
Written by	Masaya Honda
Music by	Yasuharu Takanashi
Studio	Studio Signpost (Note: Although Arms is credited with the animation production of Shin Ikki Tousen, the company declared bankruptcy in 2020, and Studio Signpost used "Arms" as a brand name for production of the work.)
Original network	AT-X
Original run	May 17, 2022 – May 31, 2022
Episodes	3
- icon

Ikki Tousen (Japanese: 一騎当千, Hepburn: Ikkitōsen; lit. "A Mighty Knight Who Matches a Thousand Knights"), also known as Battle Vixens in the Tokyopop localization (for North America and the United Kingdom) and Dragon Girls in Germany, is a Japanese manga series written and illustrated by Yūji Shiozaki. Loosely based on the classic 14th century Chinese novel Romance of the Three Kingdoms, the series revolves around an all-out turf war in the Kantō region of Japan where fighters known as Tōshi (闘士; meaning "fighting soldier") from seven schools battle for supremacy. The story centers on Hakufu Sonsaku, a fighter who transfers to Nanyo Academy, one of the seven schools involved in the turf war.

The manga was serialized in the seinen manga magazine Comic Gum from April 2000 to August 2015. The series was collected in 24 tankōbon volumes released between October 2000 and September 2015. The manga was licensed in North America and the United Kingdom by Tokyopop, with adaptation from Keith Giffen under the title Battle Vixens; and in Australia and New Zealand by Madman Entertainment.

The original manga has inspired four anime television series and three OVAs. A 13-episode adaptation animated by J.C.Staff aired between July and October 2003, on AT-X and other channels. It would be followed by a second 12-episode season, subtitled Dragon Destiny, which was animated by Arms and aired on AT-X between February and May 2007. The third and fourth anime series, Great Guardians and Xtreme Xecutor, would deviate from the manga's plot and feature original storylines and new characters. The third season was animated by Arms, and aired on AT-X between June and August 2008, while the fourth anime season was animated by TNK and aired on AT-X and other channels between March and June 2010, both spanning 12 episodes. The first OVA, Shūgaku Tōshi Keppu-roku, would be released in Japanese theaters on November 12, 2011. The second, two-episode OVA subtitled Extravaganza Epoch was released between December 21, and 28, 2014. A 3-episode OVA, Western Wolves, was released between January and February 2019.

The first anime season was initially licensed in North America by Geneon Entertainment. After Geneon withdrew from the anime market, the season would be re-licensed by Funimation. The second and third seasons were licensed in North America by Media Blasters. Funimation would later re-licensed the third season, while acquiring the fourth.

A sequel manga titled Shin Ikki Tousen began serialization in Shōnen Gahōsha's Young King OURs magazine in November 2015. A three-episode anime adaptation, once again animated by Arms, aired on AT-X in May 2022.

== Synopsis ==
Hakufu Sonsaku and Shimei Ryomou, as depicted in the first anime adaptation

In the Kantō region of Japan, seven high schools compete in a turf war for territorial supremacy: Nanyo Academy, Kyosho Academy, Seito Academy, Yoshu Academy, Rakuyo High School, Gogun High School, and Yoshu Private School. The fighters of each school bear the sacred jewels called magatama, which contains the essence of warriors from the Three Kingdoms era of Ancient China 1800 years ago, as well as their fates.

Hakufu Sonsaku, the descendant of legendary conqueror Sun Ce, is a fighter who goes to Nanyo Academy where her cousin Koukin Shuuyu attends under her mother's request.

== Media ==
=== Manga ===
Ikki Tousen began serialization in the seinen manga magazine Comic GUM. The first bound volume was published by Wani Books in October 2000, with a total of 24 volumes available as of September 25, 2015. The manga was licensed in North America and the United Kingdom by Tokyopop under the title of Battle Vixens, and sold fifteen volumes between April 6, 2004, and April 27, 2010. The manga is also licensed in Australia and New Zealand by Madman Entertainment, in France by Panini Comics, in Argentina and Spain by Editorial Ivrea, in Germany by Carlsen Comics (under the title of Dragon Girls), in Taiwan by Sharp Point Press, in Brazil by Nova Sampa.

In October 2015, Shōnen Gahōsha announced that the sequel Shin Ikki Tousen would be serialized in Young King OURs magazine starting in its January 2016 issue released on November 30, 2015.

=== Anime ===
==== Television series ====
===== 2003 =====
A 13-episode anime adaptation of Ikki Tousen animated by J.C.Staff and directed by Takashi Watanabe aired on AT-X from July 30, 2003, and October 22, 2003, with subsequent runs on TV Kanagawa, Mie TV, Chiba TV, TV Saitama, and Sun Television. The opening theme for the first season is "Drivin' Through The Night" by M.o.v.e while the ending theme is "Let me be with you" by Shela.

Seven DVD volumes were released by Media Factory between November 22, 2003, and May 25, 2004. A DVD box set was later released on January 25, 2008, and a Blu-ray box set was later released on April 27, 2011.

The series was licensed in North America by Geneon Entertainment, who released the series on four DVD volumes between August 10, 2004, and March 1, 2005. The English dub was produced by New Generation Pictures in Los Angeles, California. A box set was later released on July 19, 2005, by Geneon. The series is now licensed by Funimation after Geneon closed its doors to the North American market, and released a box set of the series on May 26, 2009. The series is also licensed in Australia and New Zealand by Madman Entertainment, and in the United Kingdom by MVM Films.

===== Dragon Destiny =====
A second season, called Ikki Tousen: Dragon Destiny (一騎当千DD(ドラゴンデスティニー), Ikkitōsen Doragon Desutinī), animated by Arms and directed by Koichi Ohata, aired 12 episodes on AT-X from February 26, 2007, to May 14, 2007, with subsequent broadcasts on Chiba TV, KBS Kyoto, TV Kanagawa, Tokyo MX, Sun Television, TV Aichi, and TV Saitama. The opening theme for Dragon Destiny is "HEART&SOUL" by Mai Kariyuki while the ending theme is "Glass Flower" (硝子の花, Garasu no Hana) by IORI.

Six DVD volumes were released by Media Factory between July 25 and November 22, 2007, each volume containing an original video animation titled Great Battle at the Red Cliffs Hot Springs (赤壁温泉大決戦, Sekiheki Onsen Dai Kessen), featuring the female cast in a hot spring setting. A DVD boxset was later released on December 22, 2009.

The anime is licensed in North America by Media Blasters, who released the series on three DVD volumes between November 24, 2009, and April 20, 2010. Unlike the first season, the English dub for Dragon Destiny was recorded at Headline Studios in Irvington, New York. A box set was later released on August 31, 2010. The anime is also licensed in Australia by Madman Entertainment, as with the first season. However, due to the series' violent and sexual scenes, the Office of Film and Literature Classification banned Ikki Tousen: Dragon Destiny in New Zealand.

===== Great Guardians =====
A third season, Ikki Tousen: Great Guardians (一騎当千GG(グレートガーディアンズ), Ikkitōsen Gurēto Gādianzu), animated by Arms and directed by Koichi Ohata, aired 12 episodes on AT-X from June 11, 2008, to August 27, 2008, with subsequent broadcasts on Chiba TV, TV Saitama, TV Aichi, TV Kanagawa, Sun Television, and Tokyo MX. The series focuses on an original storyline featuring new characters; such as Shokyo, Hakufu's younger sister and the Japanese counterpart of Xiao Qiao, and "another" Genpou Saji as an antagonist. The opening theme for Great Guardians is "No x limit" by Ami, while the ending theme is "Kage: Shape of Shadow" (影～shape of shadow～) by Rio Asaba.

Six DVD compilation volumes were released by Media Factory between September 25, 2008, and February 25, 2009, each volume containing an original video animation titled Battle Tour Club: Sexy Cosplay, Dangerous Jobs (バトルツアークラブ･セクシーコスプレ♥危険なアルバイト♥). A DVD box set was released on March 25, 2010.

The series was also licensed by Media Blasters, as with the second season, and was scheduled to be released in a complete box set on March 31, 2012. The series was originally planned to be released in two half-series sets on August 30, 2011, and October 25, 2011, respectively, prior to its rescheduled date. Media Blasters later announced on February 3, 2012, that the North American release of Great Guardians was placed on an indefinite hold. At Anime Expo 2012, Funimation announced that they had acquired the licensing rights to Great Guardians. Funimation released the DVD box-set of Great Guardians on December 31, 2013. The English dub for the third season was once again produced by New Generation Pictures whom not only recorded the original voice actors in California, but also managed to get several voice actors from Dragon Destiny to record in New York at DuArt Film and Video. On January 3, 2014, Madman Entertainment had release the series on Blu-ray on March 19, 2014.

===== Xtreme Xecutor =====
A fourth season, called Ikki Tousen: Xtreme Xecutor (一騎当千XX(エクストリームエグゼクター), Ikkitōsen Ekustorīmu Eguzekutā), was announced. Animated by TNK and directed by Koichi Ohata, the series aired twelve episodes on AT-X between March 26 and June 11, 2010, with subsequent broadcasts on Chiba TV, TV Kanagawa, TV Saitama, Tokyo MX, TV Aichi, and Sun Television. The series introduces two new schools, Nanban High School and Ryoshu Academy, and introduces Kentei, the Japanese counterpart of Emperor Xian, as an antagonist. The opening theme for Xtreme Xecutor is "Stargazer" by Yuka Masuda of AKB48 while the ending theme is "Endless Soul: Endless Warrior" (Endless Soul 〜終わりなき戦士, Endless Soul ~Owarinaki Senshi) by Masumi Asano and Aya Endo, the voices of Hakufu Sonsaku and Bachou Mouki, respectively.

Six DVD and Blu-ray volumes were released by Media Factory between June 25 and November 25, 2010. The DVD/BDs contains an original video animation called A Dream's Six Views (ユメ六景).

At Anime Expo 2012, Funimation announced that they had also acquired the licensing rights to Xtreme Xecutor alongside Great Guardians. Funimation released the DVD box-set of Xtreme Xecutor on March 11, 2014, in North America. As with the third season, the English dub was produced by both New Generation Pictures and DuArt Film and Video in California and New York, respectively.

==== OVAs ====
An original video animation, titled Ikki Tousen: Shūgaku Tōshi Keppu-roku (一騎当千 集鍔闘士血風録) was announced by Media Factory, and a promotional video was posted on their YouTube channel. The OVA was released in Japanese theaters on November 12, 2011. It was later released on DVD and Blu-ray on February 22, 2012, by Media Factory. The opening theme for the OVA is "FATE ～on the way～" by MAI & AMI. Funimation included the OVA as part of their Xtreme Xecutor DVD Box Set in North America.

A 3-episode OVA titled Ikki Tousen: Western Wolves was released between January 3, 2019, to February 27, 2019. The anime's director is Takashi Watanabe, while Masaya Honda returns as series composition.

==== Shin Ikki Tousen ====
An anime television series adaptation of Shin Ikki Tousen was announced on July 2, 2021. The series is produced by Arms, directed by Rion Kujo, from scripts written by Masaya Honda, with character designs by Rin-Sin and Tsutomu Miyazawa, while featuring music composed by Yasuharu Takanashi.

The series ran for three episodes, and aired on AT-X from May 17 to 31, 2022. The series theme song was "Proud Stars" by Konomi Suzuki.

=== Internet radio show ===
An internet radio show promoting the Dragon Destiny anime titled Ikki Tousen DDR: Dragon Destiny Radio (一騎当千DDR 〜Dragon Destiny Radio〜) was produced by Media Factory and aired on MediaFac Radio starting November 25, 2006, and aired 31 episodes. The show was hosted by Masumi Asano and Hitomi Nabatame, the voices of Hakufu and Kanu, respectively. A CD of the radio show was released by Media Factory on June 27, 2007.

Another radio show promoting Great Guardians called Ikki Tousen GGR: Great Guardians Radio (一騎当千GGR 〜Great Guardians Radio〜), also produced by Media Factory, aired on MediaFac Radio between March 26, 2008, and March 2009, spanning 23 episodes. Masumi Asano and Hitomi Nabatame reprise their host roles as Hakufu and Kanu. A CD of the show was released by Media Factory on March 25, 2009.

A radio show promoting Xtreme Xecutor called Ikki Tousen XXR: Xtreme Xecutor Radio (一騎当千XXR 〜XTREME XECUTOR RADIO〜) aired on HiBiKi Radio Station between December 25, 2009, and December 3, 2010, spanning 41 episodes. Like the last two radio shows, the show was hosted by Masumi Asano and Hitomi Nabatame reprising their respective roles as Hakufu and Kanu.

=== Video games ===
A video game of the series, Ikki Tousen: Shining Dragon (一騎当千 Shining Dragon, Ikkitōsen Shainingu Doragon), was developed by DreamFactory and released for the PlayStation 2 in Japan on July 26, 2007, by Marvelous Entertainment. The game has an original storyline with Hakufu, Ryomou, and Kanu as the main playable characters. The game introduces a new character named Chousen, the Japanese counterpart of Diao Chan. Along with Hakufu, Ryomou, and Kanu, Ryubi, Ukitsu, Chouhi, Choun, Ryofu, and Kakoen also appear as playable characters, with Shuyu appearing as an extra character in Hakufu and Ryomou's story arcs respectively. The game's international release was completed by 2008 but formally cancelled by the distributor in May 2009, with the M rating being listed as the most damaging factor.

A second video game, Ikki Tousen: Eloquent Fist (一騎当千 Eloquent Fist, Ikkitōsen Erokuento Fisuto), was developed by Tamsoft for the PlayStation Portable and released on October 2, 2008, by Marvelous Entertainment. The game is a hybrid between fighting and adventure, and it features 15 Ikki Tousen heroines and a new character named Kanpei, the Japanese counterpart of Guan Ping and the protagonist of the game. New characters include Sousou (Berserk Dragon Ruler Mode), Teni, Shokatsuryo, Ryubi, Saji, and Ouin, along with EX-Hakufu (Berserk Dragon Ruler Mode) and EX-Ryubi (whom technically is the non-Berserk Dragon Mode (as the Berserk Mode was a playable character in the first game)) (Shining Dragon). Eloquent Fist omits the presence of Ukitsu, and new finishing maneuvers and altered movesets have either been buffed, or have been nerfed.

A third installment based on the Xtreme Xecutor anime, called Ikki Tousen: Xross Impact (一騎当千 XROSS IMPACT, Ikkitōsen Kurosu Inpakuto), was developed by Tamsoft for the PlayStation Portable and released on April 28, 2010, in Japan. It features a new character named Ato, the Japanese counterpart of Liu Shan along with the return of Ukitsu as a playable character, and Chinkyu, Bashoku, Kyocho, and Shibai are added as playable characters. The game adds a "Super Arts" bar, tag-team battles and combos, and the addition of the alternate striker system. The gameplay was also revamped to include an aerial pursuit rave and a Finishing Screen.

The characters Sonsaku, Kan'u and Ryofu made a DLC playable guest appearance in Senran Kagura: Estival Versus. However, due to a temporary licensing issue, these characters did not appear in the Western version of the game, until it was announced to be released along with the PC version of the game in March 2017.

The mobile game Ikki Tousen: Extra Burst was released in 2020 by Marvelous as a special project celebrating the 20th anniversary of the Ikki Tousen series.
