= Arms (company) =

Japanese animation studio

Arms Corp., Ltd.
- Native name: 有限会社アームス
- Romanized name: Yūgen-gaisha Āmusu
- Formerly: Garyū Studio
- Type: Yūgen gaisha
- Industry: Anime, hentai anime (until 2005)
- Founded: November 18, 1996; 29 years ago August 31, 2017 (Common Sense)
- Defunct: July 22, 2020; 6 years ago
- Fate: Bankruptcy
- Successor: Studio Signpost
- Headquarters: Suginami, Tokyo, Japan
- Key people: Osamu Shimizu (representative director)

Arms Corp., Ltd. (Japanese: 有限会社アームス, Hepburn: Yūgen-gaisha Āmusu; stylized as ARMS) was a Japanese animation studio based in Suginami, Tokyo and active from 1996 to 2020. It is mostly known for being the studio that created the popular anime adaptation, Elfen Lied

== History ==
The studio was formed on November 18, 1996, as a split from Studio Kikan to operate the company's hentai brands. Studio Kikan was already producing hentai under its own name and the pseudonyms Triple X and Dandelion. When Arms was founded, the company took over all hentai-oriented works but continued using the Triple X and Dandelion brand names, as well as creating its own Garyuu Studio, until about 2002.

After its founding, ARMS was, at first, a producer of hentai (most notably its productions with Green Bunny), but ceased productions of erotica in the mid-2000s with the growing popularity of their televised works.

The studio recorded sales of ¥390 million in the fiscal year ending June 2009, during the success of its Ikki Tousen productions. Sales fell to approximately ¥260 million by the fiscal year ending June 2011, and the studio subsequently increasingly focused on production work for other animation studios.

=== Common Sense era ===
The company officially changed its name from Arms to Common Sense (株式会社コモンセンス) on August 31, 2017, but maintained the Arms label as a trade name.

On May 31, 2020, Common Sense decided dissolving the company following a shareholder meeting, with Tokyo district court accepting notice of liquidation filed on July 22, 2020.

== Productions ==
=== Hentai ===
Works animated before 1996 are listed at the page Studio Signpost.

Title	Director(s)	Released	Eps	Note(s)
Akiko	Kaoru Toyooka	March 15, 1996 – July 26, 1996	2	as Triple X
Can Can Bunny Extra	Katsuma Kanazawa	January 19, 1996 – April 21, 1997	2	as Triple X
Dōkyūsei 2	Yōsei Morino	March 22, 1996 – December 18, 1998	12	as Triple X
Rei-Lan: Orchid Emblem	Hideaki Kushi	June 21, 1996	1	as Dandelion
Lady Blue	Kan Fukumoto	July 26, 1996 – November 8, 1996	4	as Dandelion
Advancer Tina	Kan Fukumoto	August 21, 1996	1	as Dandelion
Mystery of Nonomura Hospital	Nobuetsu Andō	November 8, 1996 – January 24, 1997	2	as Triple X
November 18, 1996: Arms founded. Some productions still credited to Dandelion and Triple X until 2002.
Kawarazaki-ke no Ichizoku The Animation	Junichi Watanabe (as Shimi Ankokudou)	November 29, 1996 – April 25, 1997	2	as Triple X
Amy to Yobanaide	Kan Fukumoto	February 28, 1997 – June 27, 1997	2	as Triple X
Tokyo Private Police	Shinichi Higashi	July 21, 1997 – August 21, 1997	2	as Dandelion
Virtuacall	Kaoru Toyooka	August 29, 1997 – October 24, 1997	2	as Triple X
Welcome to Pia Carrot	Katsuma Kanazawa	October 24, 1997 – April 24, 1998	3	as Triple X
Gloria: House of the Forbidden Fruit	Yasuhiro Kuroda	November 28, 1997 – April 24, 1998	3	as Triple X
Isaku	Katsuma Kanazawa	November 28, 1997 – May 29, 1998	3	as Triple X
Dōsō Kai: Yesterday Once More	Kan Fukumoto	December 19, 1997 – September 25, 1998	4	as Triple X
Desert Island Story X	Katsuma Kanazawa	July 24, 1998 – April 23, 1999	4	as Triple X
Midnight Panther	Yōsei Morino	August 25, 1998 – December 18, 1998	2	
Welcome to Pia Carrot!! 2	Kan Fukumoto	October 23, 1998 – April 23, 1999	3	as Triple X
Natural (also called as Teacher's Pet)	Kan Fukumoto	February 25, 1999	4	
Words Worth	Kan Fukumoto	August 25, 1999 – November 25, 2000	5	
Desert Island Story XX	Katsuma Kanazawa	December 10, 1999 – June 23, 2000	4	as Triple X
Luv Wave	Katsuma Kanazawa	March 31, 2000 – October 27, 2000	3	
Mezzo Forte	Yasuomi Umetsu	May 25, 2000 - June 25, 2001	2	A film edition was released in Japan on July 23, 2004. This version includes 20 minutes of extra footage, but without the sex scenes.
Isaku Respect		February 23, 2001 – September 21, 2001	3	as Triple X
Inma Seiden	Kan Fukumoto	March 25, 2001 – October 25, 2002	6	
Él	Katsuma Kanazawa	April 25, 2001 – July 25, 2001	2	
La Blue Girl Returns	Kan Fukumoto; Hiroshi Ogawa	May 25, 2001 – May 25, 2002	4	
Princess Memory	Wataru Tomii	June 25, 2001 – September 25, 2001	2	
Natural 2: Duo	Kinji Yoshimoto	November 25, 2001 – July 24, 2003	4	
Virgin Touch	Yoshitaka Fujimoto	May 24, 2002 – August 23, 2002	2	
Words Worth Gaiden	Wataru Tomii	July 25, 2002 – September 25, 2002	2	
Dōsō Kai Again	Kan Fukumoto	July 25, 2002 – December 20, 2002	2	as Triple X
Mizuiro	Shigeki Awai	August 23, 2002 – December 6, 2002	2	
Slave Nurses	Katsuma Kanazawa	January 24, 2003 – July 25, 2003	3	
Crimson Climax	Katsuma Kanazawa	February 21, 2002 – September 25, 2003	3	
Flutter of Birds 2: Tenshi-tachi no Tsubasa	Hiroaki Nakajima	May 23, 2003 – August 22, 2003	2	
Dark Shell: Lust in the Cage	Katsuma Kanazawa	June 25, 2003 – September 25, 2003	2	
One: True Stories	Kan Fukumoto	November 21, 2003 – May 28, 2004	3	as ARMS+
Body Transfer	Yoshitaka Fujimoto	December 21, 2003 – March 25, 2004	2	as ARMS+
Kawarazaki-ke no Ichizoku 2 The Animation	Yōsei Morino	January 23, 2004 – August 27, 2004	4	as ARMS+
Immoral Sisters: Blossoming		June 25, 2004 – September 24, 2004	2	as ARMS+
Another Lady Innocent	Kinji Yoshimoto; Satoshi Urushihara	November 11, 2004	1	as ARMS+
Hininden: Gauss	Kan Fukumoto	December 22, 2005	1	as ARMS+

=== Television series ===
Title	Director(s)	Released	Eps	Note(s)
Mezzo DSA	Yasuomi Umetsu	January 4, 2004 – March 30, 2004	12	Original work.
Elfen Lied	Mamoru Kanbe	July 25, 2004 – October 17, 2004	13	Adaptation of a manga by Lynn Okamoto. Episodes 2, 5, and 10 were subcontracted to Studio Guts.
Kakyūsei 2	Yōsei Morino	October 1, 2004 – December 24, 2004	13	Based on a game by ELF.
Girls High	Yoshitaka Fujimoto	April 3, 2006 – June 19, 2006	12	Adaptation of a manga by Towa Oshima.
Himawari!	Shigenori Kageyama	April 8, 2006 – July 1, 2006	13	Adaptation of a manga by GoDo.
Himawari!!	Shigenori Kageyama	January 6, 2007 – March 31, 2007	13	Sequel to Himawari!.
Ikki Tousen: Dragon Destiny	Koichi Ohata	February 26, 2007 – May 14, 2007	12	Sequel to Ikki Tousen: Battle Vixens.
Genshiken Pt.2	Kinji Yoshimoto	October 11, 2007 – December 27, 2007	12	Sequel to Genshiken OVA.
Ikki Tousen: Great Guardians	Koichi Ohata	June 11, 2008 – August 27, 2008	12	Sequel to Ikki Tousen: Dragon Destiny.
Queen's Blade: The Exiled Virgin	Kinji Yoshimoto	April 2, 2009 – June 18, 2009	12	Based on a series of visual combat books published by Hobby Japan.
Queen's Blade 2: The Evil Eye	Kinji Yoshimoto	September 24, 2009 – December 10, 2009	12	Sequel to Queen's Blade: The Exiled Virgin.
Hyakka Ryōran: Samurai Girls	KOBUN	September 4, 2010 – December 20, 2010	12	Adaptation of a light novel series by Akira Suzuki and Niθ.
Queen's Blade Rebellion	Yōsei Morino	April 3, 2012 – June 19, 2012	12	Media franchise sequel to the Queen's Blade series.
Aesthetica of a Rogue Hero	Rion Kujo	July 6, 2012 – September 21, 2012	12	Adaptation of a light novel series by Tetsuto Uesu and Tamago no Kimi.
Maoyu: Archenemy & Hero	Takeo Takahashi	January 5, 2013 – March 30, 2013	12	Adaptation of a light novel series by Mamare Touno, Keinojou Mizutama, and Toi8.
Hyakka Ryōran: Samurai Bride	KOBUN	April 5, 2013 – June 21, 2013	12	Sequel to Hyakka Ryōran: Samurai Girls.
Wanna Be the Strongest in the World!	Rion Kujo	October 6, 2013 – December 22, 2013	12	Adaptation of a manga by ESE and Kiyohito Natsuki.
Wizard Barristers: Benmashi Cecil	Yasuomi Umetsu	January 12, 2014 – March 30, 2014	12	Original work.
Brynhildr in the Darkness	Kenichi Imaizumi	April 6, 2014 – June 29, 2014	13	Adaptation of a manga by Lynn Okamoto.
Isuca	Akira Iwanaga	January 24, 2015 – March 28, 2015	10	Adaptation of a manga by Osamu Takahashi.
Valkyrie Drive: Mermaid	Hiraku Kaneko	October 10, 2015 – December 26, 2015	12	Part of a media franchise created by Marvelous.

=== OVAs ===
Title	Director(s)	Released	Eps	Note(s)
Welcome to Pia Carrot!! 2 DX	Yōsei Morino	December 18, 1999 – October 25, 2000	6	Adaptation of an eroge by Cocktail Soft, KID, and Stack. As Garyū Studio.
First Kiss Story	Kan Fukumoto	February 14, 2000	1	Adaptation of a visual novel by HuneX. As Garyū Studio.
One: Kagayaku Kisetsu e	Yōsei Morino	August 10, 2001 – May 24, 2002	4	Adaptation of an eroge by Tactics. As Garyū Studio.
Nakoruru: Ano Hito kara no Okurimono	Katsuma Kanazawa	May 25, 2002	1	Adaptation of a fighting game by SNK. As Garyū Studio.
From I"s	Yōsei Morino	December 9, 2002 – March 25, 2003	2	Adaptation of a manga by Masakazu Katsura. Co-produced by Pierrot. As Garyū Studio.
With You: Mitsumeteitai	Yōsei Morino	December 25, 2002 – May 25, 2003	2	Adaptation of a game by Cocktail Soft. As Garyū Studio.
Elfen Lied: Regenschauer	Mamoru Kanbe	April 21, 2005	1	Episode 10.5 of Elfen Lied.
I"s Pure	Mamoru Kanbe	November 1, 2005 – July 23, 2006	6	Adaptation of a manga by Masakazu Katsura. Co-produced by Pierrot.
Saiyuki Reload Burial	Koichi Ohata	April 27, 2007 – December 28, 2007	3	Adaptation of a manga by Kazuya Minekura.
Ramen Angel Pretty Menma		January 25, 2008	1	
Queen's Blade: Beautiful Warriors	Kinji Yoshimoto	August 8, 2010 – January 9, 2011	6	Sequel to Queen's Blade 2: The Evil Eye.
Ikki Tousen: Shūgaku Tōshi Keppu-roku	Rion Kujo	November 12, 2011	1	Sequel to Ikki Tousen: Xtreme Xecutor.
Brynhildr in the Darkness: Much Ado About Nothing	Kenichi Imaizumi	March 26, 2014	1	Episode 11.5 of Brynhildr in the Darkness.
Ikki Tousen: Extravaganza Epoch	Masashi Kudō	December 21, 2014 – December 28, 2014	3	Sequel to Ikki Tousen: Shūgaku Tōshi Keppu-roku.
Hyakka Ryōran: Samurai After	Toshinori Fukushima	January 23, 2015 – July 1, 2015	2	Sequel to Hyakka Ryōran: Samurai Bride.
Isuca: Paradise	Akira Iwanaga	August 16, 2015	1	Episode 11 of Isuca.
Ikki Tousen: Western Wolves	Takashi Watanabe (Chief); Mitsutoshi Satō	January 3, 2019 – February 27, 2019	3	

=== Films ===
Title	Director(s)	Released	Length	Note(s)
Kite	Yasuomi Umetsu	February 25, 1998 – October 25, 1998 (Note: Kite: International was released as a compiled version of the two originally released OVAs for the Western audience. Despite its original two-episode release, Kite is most commonly found in its film format.)	60 minutes (Uncensored); 45 minutes (Censored)	Original work.
Kite Liberator	Yasuomi Umetsu	April 8, 2008	60 minutes	Original work.
