= Queen's Blade Grimoire =

Series of visual combat books published by Hobby Japan

- Cover of the first Queen's Blade Grimoire gamebook released by Hobby Japan featuring Alicia.
- Original video animation
- Directed by: Kinji Yoshimoto (chief Director); Yoshihide Yuuzumi (OVA 1)
- Written by: Masashi Suzuki
- Studio: FORTES
- Released: January 29, 2016 – September 28, 2016
- Runtime: 30 minutes
- Episodes: 2

Queen's Blade Grimoire (Japanese: クイーンズブレイド グリムワール, Hepburn: Kuīnzu Bureido Gurimuwāru) is a series of visual combat books published by Hobby Japan. It is the fourth series of gamebooks in the Queen's Blade series, but unlike Queen's Blade and its sequel, Queen's Blade Rebellion, which are directly linked to each other, Grimoire is an all-new story set in a parallel universe. Like the previous Queen's Blade books, Grimoire will be compatible with Flying Buffalo's Lost Worlds gamebooks, and each gamebook will be illustrated by many popular artists. The first series of gamebooks, featuring Alicia and Zara, were released on November 24, 2012.

== Story ==
The prologue to the story is told as a conversation between two undisclosed characters. The same story appears in all the published books (without the conversation part) in heavily decorated, barely readable English.

"Hey grandmother, tell me a story!"

"Okay. How about I tell you the best story that I know?"

"It's a story that takes place in a separate world. Mel Fair Land, the country of endless summer. It was a peaceful world, where humans and other species lived alongside magic. However, when the "Devil of Winter" (冬の魔王, Fuyu no Maō) arrived suddenly, we knew that our endless summer was coming to an end. According to the astrologists' predictions, She who defeats the Devil must be wielding the legendary sword called "The Queen's Blade." Thus, the "Naked Queen" (裸の女王様, Hadaka no Joō-sama) who rules the country, gathered the most confident, beautiful warriors from all over the world and started a tournament which would find out who the most suitable warrior was. But the beautiful warriors who gathered were not here to save the world... Instead, the tournament was filled with the most outrageous bunch of girls you'll ever hear of."

== Characters ==
Alicia (不思議の国の闇使い アリシア, Fushiki no Kuni no Yamitsukai Arishia; "Darkmaster in Wonderland Alicia")
Voiced by: Saori Ōnishi
A magic swordswoman who lost her way from a dimension different than Mel Fair Land (メルフェアランド, Merufearando). Though Alicia was perplexed by the foreign world, the foreigners treated her as a strange person conversely. She is a user of dark magic, holding a powerful power that matches her terribly haughty and confident persona. Though she behaves arrogantly, she hates twisted things. Though she often abuses the residents of the borderland for lacking common sense, will Alicia be gradually tainted by this world too? She's participating in this tournament in hopes of returning to Mel Fair Land. Her name and backstory are based on the titular character from Alice's Adventures in Wonderland (不思議の国のアリス, Fushiki no Kuni no Arisu). Created by Kurehito Misaki.
Kaguya (魔装剣姫 カグヤ, Masōken-hime Kaguya; "Magic Clothing Sword Princess Kaguya")
Voiced by: Manami Tanaka
A collector of "Magic Clothing" (魔装（魔法の宝物）, Mahō no Takaramono; lit. 'Magic Treasures'), and self-proclaimed "Person from the Moon". Although she has made an earnest supply of treasure from many people due to her cute appearance, she is not a wicked, calculating woman, she is only childlike, with a low mental age. She was found by an old couple, who raised and indulged her very much. She is participating in the tournament because she is interested in the Queen's Blade the winner is said to obtain. She is named after the character Kaguya-hime from the Japanese folktale The Tale of the Bamboo Cutter (竹取物語, Taketori Monogatari). Created by saitom.
Zara (赤頭巾の魔狩人 ザラ, Aka Zukin no Makaryōto Zara; "Demon-Hunting Little Red Riding Hood Zara")
Voiced by: Shizuka Ishigami
A cool, beautiful huntress who is accompanied by a demon wolf which once ate her grandmother and her. She survived being eaten by the demon wolf, and acquiring a magic power in his belly, she was reborn as a fighter. She gained the ability to regenerate her body even if it was torn apart and chewed up. A true good person that became a demon hunter in order to prevent people in sorrowful circumstances to end up like her, though she won't reveal her mouth. Her nemesis is the "Demon Monkey Necromancer" (妖猿の屍術師), and hearing that she is participating in the tournament, she has followed her there. She is based on the titular character from the European fairy tale "Little Red Riding Hood" (赤頭巾, Aka Zukin), with her wolf companion being based on the Big Bad Wolf. Created by Fool's.
Tiina (人魚姫 ティーナ, Ningyo-hime Tīna; "Little Mermaid Tiina")
Voiced by: Saori Goto
The youngest daughter of the Kingdom of the Seabed (海底の王国, Kaitei no Ōkoku). Yearning for a man on the surface, she made a wicked deal with the Demon Monkey Necromancer, and got the ability to change her tail into two legs. Since she can also swim in the air in a mermaid's form too, she has no inconveniences living in the ground, but it is a problem of looks. However, since she almost became captured by that same monkey, she ran away. Though she has a timid personality, she thinks that she can change herself by fighting at the tournament. Though she can manipulate the force of water, she is constantly wet because of that, resulting in her clothes being wet as well. She is based on the titular character from the Danish fairy tale "The Little Mermaid" (人魚姫, Ningyo-hime). Created by Eiwa.
Goldie (黄金の戦斧 ゴールディー, Ōgon no Sen Ono Gōrudī; "Golden Battleaxe Goldie")
Born in the prestigious Sir Carter (サー カーター, Sā Kātā) house, she was a young lady who loved nature, living her life in ease and comfort, but triggered by a certain "Lady of the Lake" (湖の乙女, Mizuumi no Otome) giving her a golden battleaxe, she discarded her house, and became a Gold Ranger to protect nature. Though she has a wild fighting style of brute force, because she's of good birth, she's usually polite and has a deep cultural knowledge too. She has a basically friendly personality, but also a nervous side, and sometimes may not stand things that are too big or too small. In that case, she wouldn't hesitate to resort to the use of force with her axe. Her favorite phrase is "That's just right." Also, though she has the ability to tame any animal, it may not be effective for females. She is based on the titular character from the Japanese fairy tale "Kintarō" (金太郎, Kintarō), mixed with her benefactor being based on the Lady of the Lake. Created by F.S.
Gretel (魔女討ちの菓子職人 グレーテル, Majo Uchi no Kashi Shokunin Gurēteru; "Witch Slayer Confectioner Gretel")
Abandoned by her stepmother at an early age, Gretel won a fierce fight with the man-eating witch that lived in the depths of the forest, and obtained the witch's power, the "ability to make articles and structures out of sweets." However, that was when she began manifesting a personality with a manly nature called "Hansel." Though Gretel has an earnest, kind-hearted personality, when she becomes Hansel, she turns into a hedonistic character that likes women and fighting. While she usually works as a skillful confectioner, she decided to participate in the tournament when she learnt of the crisis looming over Mel Fair Land. Since she continued training after overcoming the challenges from her childhood, her base fighting strength is high. Her strong point is her cool, reliable way of fighting, but she overcomes her opponents with her moody fighting when she becomes Hansel. She is based on the titular character from the German fairy tale "Hansel and Gretel" (ヘンゼルとグレーテル, Henzeru to Gurēteru). Created by Kantaka.

== Media ==
=== Gamebooks ===
- Series 1 (Alicia and Zara) – Released on November 24, 2012.
- Series 2 (Tiina) – Released on June 28, 2013.
- Series 3 (Goldie) – Released on July 20, 2013.
