= List of Queen's Blade episodes =

The first DVD volume of Queen's Blade: Wandering Warrior, released by Media Factory on June 25, 2009

Queen's Blade is an anime television series based on the visual combat books by Hobby Japan. Produced by ARMS, the anime is directed and composed by Kinji Yoshimoto, produced by Hiromasa Minami, Hirotaka Yoshida, Kazuaki Morijiri, Masaaki Yokota and Shinsaku Tanaka, characters by Rin Sin, and music by Masaru Yokoyama. The episodes' plot covers the events leading up to the Queen's Blade—a tournament of strength and beauty held every four years to decide who will be the next Queen, and the story focuses on Leina Vance, heiress to the count, travelling to Gainos to compete in the Queen's Blade tournament.

The first season of the anime, called Queen's Blade: Wandering Warrior (クイーンズブレイド 流浪の戦士, Kuīnzu Bureido Rurō no Senshi), premiered on AT-X on April 2, 2009, and ran twelve episodes until June 18, 2009, with subsequent broadcasts on Chiba TV, Sun Television, and Tokyo MX. The show aired uncensored on AT-X, while it is heavily censored on other channels. Six DVD and Blu-ray Disc volumes were released by Media Factory between June 25 and November 25, 2009, each DVD/BD volume containing one of six OVAs called Let's Get Everyone♥Great Rampage at Gynos Academy! (みんなでちゃうよ♥ガイノス学園大暴れ!, Minna de Chau yo♥Gainos Gakuen Dai Abare!), which features the Queen's Blade fighters in a school setting. The anime is licensed in North America by Media Blasters under the English-language title Queen's Blade: The Exiled Virgin, and released three DVD volumes between May 18 and October 26, 2010. A DVD/BD box set of the series was later released on February 15, 2011.

A second season of the anime, called Queen's Blade: Inheritor of the Throne (クイーンズブレイド 玉座を継ぐ者, Kuīnzu Bureido Gyokuza o Tsugumono), aired on AT-X and other channels between September 24 and December 10, 2009, spanning twelve episodes as with the first season. The series, also produced by ARMS, is directed by Kinji Yoshimoto, composed by Takao Yoshioka, script by Michiko Ito, Yoshioka, Taku Satō, and Toshimitsu Takeuchi, and characters by Rin-Sin. Six DVD/BD volumes were released by Media Factory between December 22, 2009, and May 25, 2010, each containing six OVAs called Let's Show♥Great Rampage at Gynos Academy (やっぱりでちゃうよ♥ガイノス学園大暴れ!, Yappari de Chau yo♥Gainosu Gakuen Dai Abare!), a continuation from the first six OVAs. The second season is also licensed in North America by Media Blasters under the title Queen's Blade 2: The Evil Eye, and sold two volumes (each containing six episodes) between May 24, 2011, and July 19, 2011. A Blu-ray box set was later released on September 27, 2011.

An OVA series, called Queen's Blade: Beautiful Fighters (クイーンズブレイド ～美しき闘士たち～, Kuīnzu Bureido ~Utsukushiki Tōshi-tachi~), was announced on the May issue of Hobby Japan. The series takes place after the Queen's Blade tournament and serves as a prologue for Queen's Blade Rebellion, and chronicles the fighters on their separate paths. Six episodes were released on DVD and Blu-ray between August 25, 2010, and February 23, 2011.

The opening theme for the first season is "Get the Door" by Rie Ohashi, while the ending theme is "Memories and Promises" (思い出と約束, Omoide to Yakusoku) by Ayako Kawasumi, Mamiko Noto, and Aya Hirano, the voices for Leina, Tomoe, and Nanael, respectively. For the second season, the opening theme is "Empty Sky" (墜ちない空, Ochinai Sora) by ENA, while the ending theme is "buddy-body" by Rie Kugimiya, Yūko Gotō, and Kanae Itō, the voices for Melona, Menace, and Airi, respectively. For the OVA, the ending theme is "Bitōshi Carnival: Taoreru Toki wa Maemuki ni" (美闘士カーニバル～たおれる時は前向きに～) by All 19 Beautiful Warriors, consisting of the entire voice cast of the series.

== Episodes ==
=== Queen's Blade: Wandering Warrior (JP) / Queen's Blade: The Exiled Virgin (NA) / (クイーンズブレイド 流浪の戦士, Kuīnzu Bureido: Rurō no Senshi) ===
No.	Title	Original release date	English air date
1	"High Spirits: The Wandering Warrior"; Transliteration: "Kien ~ Rurō no Senshi" (Japanese: 気炎～流浪の戦士)	April 2, 2009	June 5, 2017
Leina is walking outside of town when she encounters Melona, and tells her she is going to defeat her for attacking travellers. Melona taunts Leina for being such a weak fighter, and says she only wants to fight decent warriors as she is a participant in the Queen's Blade, a tournament held every four years to decide who is going to be the next Queen. Risty is watching the battle from the sidelines, and just as Melona is about to kill Leina, Risty intervenes and saves her life. Risty tends to Leina until she recovers and takes her as a prisoner back to Vance Castle to recover the bounty on her head. When Risty arrives at the castle, Claudette appears and arrests Risty for being a thief and imprisons her in the castle's dungeon. However, Risty escapes and steals the Vance Family's heirloom breastplate. She hides in Leina's room and gives Leina the armor, then leaves, encountering Claudette outside and they fight. Meanwhile, Melona appears at Leina's window. They fight, and Leina defeats Melona by stopping her from shooting acid from her breasts, causing her to explode.
2	"Ambitious Undertaking: Warrior Priestess"; Transliteration: "Sōto ~ Musha Miko" (Japanese: 壮途～武者巫女)	April 9, 2009	June 12, 2017
Tomoe, a Warrior Priestess, and Shizuka, a Kouma Ninja who has defected, are meditating in the shrine they tend to in Hinomoto. Tomoe decides she is going to travel to the Continent to compete in the Queen's Blade tournament. During the night, the Kouma Ninja attack the temple. As the battle is being waged, one Kouma Ninja sets off a bomb, destroying much of the temple the priestesses occupy. Trapped in the burning buildings, Tomoe and the other priestesses attempt to escape. However, the Kouma Ninja transform into a giant toad which starts killing the priestesses. Eventually, Tomoe gathers her inner strength and defeats the giant toad. She is then saddened by the loss of her friends, and declares she will avenge them and win the Queen's Blade tournament for them. The next morning, Tomoe and Shizuka set off across the sea for the mainland.
3	"Charm Attack: Veteran Mercenary"; Transliteration: "Enshū ~ Rekisen no Yōhei" (Japanese: 艶襲～歴戦の傭兵)	April 16, 2009	June 19, 2017
Tomoe and Shizuka arrive on the mainland. Tomoe attempts to blend in by choosing an outfit more fitting for the mainland when she overhears a Queen's Blade battle being undertaken. Leina and Risty reach the entrance to where the Queen's Blade tournament is being held. Echidna later arrives, charged with returning Leina to Claudette. Echidna paralyzes Leina and Risty with her snake and steals Risty's gold. Leina decides to enter a competition to earn enough money to continue. The competition involves mud wrestling for a large crowd. In her first match, Leina tries to get close in an attempt to wrestle her opponent, but she keeps dodging Leina's every attempt until Leina attempts led to bits of mud to smear all over her opponent, distracting her long enough for Leina to get behind and toss her down. Leina is victorious in her first match but only wins five gold pieces, not enough to pay their bills, so she has to keep fighting; however, this time in an oil match against Echidna. Leina has some doubts but recalls her victory at her previous match and tries to attack first, only to slip miserably on the oil. Echidna offers to help her up, but tricks Leina into a painful bear hug. Not willing to give up, Leina lifts Echidna, who asks then what. Leina throws her down in a pin, but Echidna uses the oil to slip away and begins to subject Leina in a series of painful holds. She continues to have the upper hand in the battle as Leina has difficulty fighting in the oil, and Echidna chases out all the spectators just as she is about to kill Leina. Meanwhile, Risty breaks into where the winnings are kept and steals them. Echidna's snake Kelta bites Leina on the chest and poisons her, but at the last moment Echidna gives her an anti-venom. Leina has passed out and when she comes to Risty is gone. Leina heads off to find Risty.
4	"Rivalry: Thundercloud General"; Transliteration: "Sōkoku ~ Raiun no Shō" (Japanese: 相克～雷雲の将)	April 23, 2009	June 26, 2017
Claudette arrives where Leina and Risty were the night before and encounters Echidna, who explains she let Leina go so that Claudette could become countess and hence reward her. Claudette goes to find Leina, and has a flashback to where she rescued Leina as a child. Meanwhile, Leina eats a poisonous mushroom and Nanael turns up to help her out with some medicine. Leina asks Nanael where Risty is, but she does not know. Claudette arrives and chastises Leina for consorting with thieves and challenges her to a fight to decide who will be the next countess. Tomoe and Shizuka watch the battle from afar and decide Claudette will be victorious. Claudette forfeits to protect Leina's honor but Leina refuses to accept the forfeit and continues to fight, asking why she has to be the heiress and does not understand why Claudette just accepts it when her father did not like her at all. Claudette says she does it for the Vance Family and attacks Leina, defeating her swiftly with a lightning attack. The ground gives way and Leina almost falls from the cliff, with Claudette grabbing her hand as she dangles over the edge. Unfortunately, Leina slips from her hand and falls into the ravine below.
5	"Resurrected Curse: Ancient Princess"; Transliteration: "Soju ~ Kodai no Ōjo" (Japanese: 蘇呪～古代の王女)	April 30, 2009	July 3, 2017
Leina is missing, swept down the river at the bottom of the ravine, and Echidna goes searching for her. Leina has been enslaved by Menace inside her pyramid. Tomoe and Shizuka approach where Menace is holding Leina, in the Queen's Capital. A sandstorm appears and Leina, still possessed, attacks Tomoe and Shizuka. Nanael appears and turns this into a Queen's Blade round between the possessed Leina and Tomoe. Tomoe and Nanael become trapped in a pyramid with many booby traps. However, Nanael manages to escape by finding a hole in the wall. Just as Tomoe is about to drown in a water trap, Nanael returns to witness Tomoe use her sword to wedge open a brick in the wall and drain the water out, encountering Leina after she escapes. Tomoe manages to break the curse on Leina, causing Menace to attack Tomoe and causing the bridge they are standing on to crumble, with Leina falling into the abyss below. Shizuka rescues Tomoe from Menace, and explains to Menace how her kingdom failed because of the failure of the princess without realizing Menace was that princess. Menace, through her anger, causes the pyramid to self destruct, and Tomoe, Shizuka and Nanael are washed outside as it is destroyed. Menace states her intention of resurrecting the Kingdom of Amara.
6	"Promise: Forest Keeper"; Transliteration: "Yakusoku ~ Mori no Bannin" (Japanese: 約束～森の番人)	May 7, 2009	July 10, 2017
Leina recovers outside the pyramid on the edge of a forest, and a Maid of Temptation, Airi, is turning the forest into a swamp. Airi is then attacked by Nowa, Guardian of the Forest. However, she catches Nowa and steals her life energy, but Leina intervenes and fights Airi. Airi starts draining her life energy, but Leina breaks free and Airi disappears after slashing Leina across the chest. Nowa nurses Leina back to health, introducing her to Combat Instructor Alleyne who heals her wounds, after explaining how the Elves do not normally let humans into the forest. Leina enters the main Elf city and the Elves are not pleased, and confront Nowa about it. Elina goes to search for her sister, while Count Vance holds Claudette in the castle. The Elf Council forces Nowa to leave the village and fight in the Queen's Blade. Alleyne wanted to compete, but was not allowed by the elders. Leina stops Nowa from leaving the forest and causes her to fight, trying to dissuade her from competing. Nowa convinces Leina to let her compete and the two of them part ways.
7	"Advent: Angel of Light"; Transliteration: "Kōrin ~ Kōmyō no Tenshi" (Japanese: 降臨～光明の天使)	May 14, 2009	July 17, 2017
In Heaven, Nanael is summoned by the Head Angel, who plans to exile her to Hades as she has forced people to fight each other. She threatens to send her to Hades unless she goes to where the Swamp Witch is and find out what she is up to. Hachiel, a fellow angel, goes with Nanael under the Head Angel's orders to keep her in check, but falls into the swamp and is later rescued by Leina. Meanwhile, Nanael is relaxing in a hot spring by the entrance to Hades when Melona, Menace and Airi show up in a nearby spring. They all discuss about how they were defeated by Leina, and Nanael passes out from the heat and turns up in the same spring as the other three, where she accidentally tells them she has come to observe the Swamp Witch. Nanael offers to tell them where Leina is in exchange for information about the Swamp Witch. They tell her that the three of them have been asked to participate in the Queen's Blade. Nanael then tells them the direction to go to find Leina and they run off to find her. Nanael suddenly realizes she has put Leina is grave danger and goes to stop the three of them from reaching her and they fight, with Nanael swiftly defeating them. Upon returning to Heaven, the Head Angel still banishes Nanael from Heaven, and tells her she must follow and help Leina on Earth.
8	"Stealth: Assassin of the Fang"; Transliteration: "Anyaku ~ Kiba no Ansatsusha" (Japanese: 暗躍～牙の暗殺者)	May 21, 2009	July 24, 2017
Nanael is following Leina on her journey. Tomoe and Shizuka are continuing on their journey as well, and rest at a hot spring. Elina is also on the road and encounters Tomoe and later tells her to leave the springs, but before she goes, Elina realizes that Tomoe has fought Leina. Elina announces she will also compete in Queen's Blade. Shizuka encounters Irma, a member of the Queen's Assassins of the Fang, and starts fighting her near the hot springs, but is swiftly defeated. Elina tries to fight Tomoe, but she refuses as it is an unjustified battle. Shizuka is captured by Irma after the battle and is questioned about her time as a Kouma Ninja, and is beaten unconscious. Tomoe spends the night looking for her and encounters Irma in disguise, who brings her to Shizuka and threatens to kill her if Tomoe does not help her. Shizuka reveals that it was Irma who made the Kouma Ninja attack them back in their homeland. Tomoe challenges Irma to a Queen's Blade fight to avenge the deaths of her fellow priestesses, and defeats her after a long battle in which Irma flees. Meanwhile, Claudette announces to her father that she wants to participate in the Queen's Blade.
9	"Sincerity: The Weaponsmith and the Steel Princess"; Transliteration: "Sekishin ~ Bukiya to Kōtetsu Hime" (Japanese: 赤心～武器屋と鋼鉄姫)	May 28, 2009	July 31, 2017
Steel Princess Ymir announces that she will take vengeance against Cattleya for selling low-cost weapons compared to the Steel Mountain ones that she creates. Cattleya leaves her son Lana in charge of her store, and Echidna shows up asking Lana where Leina is. Cattleya runs into Leina and Nanael on the road and asks to look at her weapon. Ymir shows up at Cattleya's store and encounters Echidna there who scares her off with her snake. Cattleya and Leina return and run into Echidna. Echidna relates the tale of how Cattleya and Owen used to be great warriors before they retired. Tomoe and Shizuka are looking for a map to get to the capital city and Risty shows up to sell them one. Echidna leaves during the night, and the next morning Ymir finds the real Cattleya and challenges her to a fight. On Lana's insistence, Leina tries to help and finds the Giant Slayer weapon which she gives to Cattleya, who uses it to defeat Ymir and decides to enter the Queen's Blade. Cattleya later gives Leina a new sword. While leaving town, Leina runs into Risty on the road.
10	"Enlightenment: Blow of the Dragon"; Transliteration: "Kaigan ~ Ryū no Ichigeki" (Japanese: 開眼～竜の一撃)	June 4, 2009	August 7, 2017
Risty, Tomoe, and Shizuka all reach the edge of Gynos, and Leina and Nanael catch up with them. Risty tells them to leave, so Leina challenges her to a Queen's Blade fight which Risty accepts. Risty is about to defeat Leina when Tomoe intervenes to stop the battle. Risty tells Leina not to bother competing in the Queen's Blade as she is not strong enough. Echidna arrives and challenges Risty to a fight; however, after a few minutes of fighting they stop, and Risty announces they will fight again in three days. Leina admits she has no purpose for fighting like everyone else and Tomoe reassures her that she is still right to fight in the Queen's Blade. Leina slips out during the night and meets Echidna, and asks her to teach her how to fight. Echidna makes her a suit out of tree sap to protect against being injured in the practice battles. Echidna fights her with all her strength and Leina is so afraid she can barely move. Emboldened by this, Echidna and Leina fight nonstop for two days. In the end, Leina is finally able to land a blow on Echidna, a move Echidna refers to as the Dragon's Tail. Leina comes to fight Risty, only to discover she has already been defeated by Claudette.
11	"Thunder: Struggle to the Death"; Transliteration: "Genrei ~ Shitō no Hate" (Japanese: 厳霊〜死闘の果て)	June 11, 2009	August 14, 2017
Risty is fighting Claudette when she realizes she is starting to go numb from the poison that Echidna has given her, and Claudette defeats her. Leina uses the Elven medicine she has to heal Risty, and challenges Claudette to a Queen's Blade battle. Elina witnesses the battle starting and rides as fast as she can to reach them. Claudette tells Leina she has always hated her for her immaturity. Risty recovers in time to see Leina be able to deflect one of Claudette's lighting attacks. Leina attacks Claudette with her Dragon Tail attack which Claudette deflects with her sword, only to have her sword explode injuring them both. Claudette finally acknowledges Leina as a true warrior and reconciles with her, causing Nanael to declare the match a draw. Elina arrives as the battle ends, and announces she will be entering the Queen's Blade as well. Nowa and Cattleya see the Army of the Dead approaching Gynos. Aldra, the current Queen, reveals the Swamp Witch wants to prevent the Queen's Blade tournament, with Shizuka overhearing it. Everyone is about to enter Gainos when Melona, Menace and Airi show up with the Army of the Dead.
12	"Open Gate: The Way to the Queen"; Transliteration: "Kaimon ~ Joō e no Michi." (Japanese: 開門〜女王への道)	June 18, 2009	August 21, 2017
Cattleya and Ymir head to Gainos to help out those being attacked by the Army of the Dead. Melona, Menace, Airi and the Army of the Dead continue the onslaught against Leina, Risty, Elina, Claudette and Tomoe. Leina is separated from the rest of the girls and must fight Melona, Airi, and Menace alone. Leina is about to be defeated when Nowa and Alleyne show up and save her. Melpha appears and destroys all the Army of the Dead in one fell swoop using the "Holy Pose: Banishment" once the Queen's Blade battle is announced. Melona shapeshifts into various other characters to try and confuse and outwit Leina. Tomoe comes to aid Leina against Melona, dispatching her and continuing the fight against Menace. Melona transforms into Leina to precipitate an ironic end to Leina; however, Leina overcomes Melona with her Dragon Tail. In desperation, Melona summons a massive Demon Serpent from Hell, which Tomoe attempts to attack but is paralyzed. Claudette attempts to use a lightning attack, also to no avail. Nanael flies Leina up to the Serpent's face, and Leina stabs the Serpent in the eye, defeating her. Aldra appears and petrifies the Serpent, which then crumbles into the water. Nanael informs them all she is returning to Heaven, and Tomoe apologizes to Leina for underestimating her. Aldra announces they can all enter Gainos, allowing the tournament for the Queen's Blade to begin.

=== Queen's Blade: Inheritor of the Throne (JP) / Queen's Blade 2: The Evil Eye (NA) / (クイーンズブレイド 玉座を継ぐ者, Kuīnzu Bureido: Gyokuza o Tsugumono) ===
No.	Title	Original release date
1	"Assemble! Queen's Blade"; Transliteration: "Sanshū! Kuīnzu Bureido" (Japanese: 参集! クイーンズブレイド)	September 24, 2009
Nanael is reassigned by the Head Angel to compete in the Queen's Blade as punishment for failing her prior assignment. Heaven suspects something is wrong with Queen Aldra. Everyone is looking for residences in Gainos: Tomoe with Shizuka, Ymir with Cattleya, Alleyne with Nowa, Nanael with Melpha, and Elina with Claudette. Echidna is there as well, and confronts the rogue assassin Irma. Melona tries to take things into her own hands and assassinate Aldra, but is turned to stone by Aldra's power. Nyx, a new contender, is revealed.
2	"Crush the Evil! The Unexpected Battle"; Transliteration: "Haja! Omoigakenai Tatakai" (Japanese: 破邪! 思いがけない闘い)	October 1, 2009
Leina is having trouble finding accommodations until she mentions she is in the Queen's Blade, and the greedy hotel manager rushes to fill her order and ends up rooming her with Echidna. Tomoe and Shizuka meet Melpha, and Tomoe admires her for dressing more appropriately than other competitors. It is revealed that Nyx used to be a maid for the Vance Family, and was treated cruelly by Elina. Aldra wants a new servant to lead the Assassins, and sends a fake letter to lure Risty to her palace. Once there, she awakens the hate in Risty's soul, making Risty her servant. The first match is fought: Tomoe vs Melpha, where Tomoe finds that Melpha uses the lewd "Holy Poses" to fight, giving Tomoe the resolve to defeat her perversion. Another match begins: Elina vs Nyx.
3	"Flame Burst! Blazing Destinies"; Transliteration: "Enjō! Moeagaru In'en" (Japanese: 炎情! 燃え上がる因縁)	October 8, 2009
It is revealed that Nyx is enslaved to a tentacle demon lord named Funikura, who has given her magical fire power, yet often molests her with its tentacles. Elina realizes that Nyx is a coward without Funikura, and tricks her into relinquishing it, upon which Nyx surrenders. Risty is revealed as the new leader of the Assassins of the Fang. Aldra turns Funikura to stone, saying that old demons should not wander free. Nowa gets lost in the Gainos marketplace and is almost raped by a gang of street punks who were swiftly beaten by Echidna. Nowa and Alleyne are summoned to fight in a swamp, as are Echidna and Irma. It is then revealed to be a team match: Alleyne and Nowa vs Echidna and Irma.
4	"Confrontation! The Ties That Call Us Together"; Transliteration: "Taiketsu! Yobiau Kizuna" (Japanese: 対決! 呼び合う絆)	October 15, 2009
Irma refuses to help Echidna, so Alleyne and Nowa resolve to pick them off one by one. Echidna's past is revealed. Echidna manages to trap Alleyne in a pitcher plant, then to pin Nowa. Alleyne breaks free and takes the initiative against Echidna, but Irma appears, threatening to kill the trapped Nowa and forcing Alleyne to surrender. Leina brings her sword to Cattleya for repair again, while Ymir's attempts to sell weapons go unnoticed in the market. Cattleya states her resolve to reunite her family. The next set of matches begins: Leina vs Ymir and Cattleya vs Airi, the latter being fought in the room where Aldra keeps all of those she has turned to stone.
5	"Intrigue! Grief in the Royal Palace"; Transliteration: "Sakubō! Nageki no Ōkyū" (Japanese: 策謀! 嘆きの王宮)	October 22, 2009
Ymir uses the fact that her bout is being broadcast to advertise the effectiveness of her weapons, especially since Leina is using a Cattleya weapon. Leina emerges victorious, however. Lana is hanging on to Cattleya during her fight with Airi, but actually proves to be helpful as Airi cannot bring herself to kill him. Cattleya is winning when she sees that Owen is frozen inside one of the stones in Aldra's "Palace of Grief" and breaks down crying, conceding defeat. Aldra promises to reunite Cattleya with her husband, and does so by turning her to stone as well. Filled with grief, Lana grabs Cattleya's spear and tries to attack Aldra. Aldra is about to turn him to stone too when Airi rescues him and they escape. They are confronted by Risty and the Assassins of the Fang, but when Risty is about to strike Lana down, she remembers the orphans she used to care for and hesitates, allowing them to escape. Lana keeps following Airi around, and she resolves to care for him in Cattleya's stead. When Cattleya does not return, Ymir asks Leina to allow her to care for her sword from now on. The next match is set: Claudette vs Menace.
6	"Complications! Changing Premonitions"; Transliteration: "Sakusō! Kawariyuku Yokan" (Japanese: 錯綜! 変わりゆく予感)	October 29, 2009
Claudette and Menace are fighting in a desert, giving Menace the upper hand. Her sand attacks confuse Claudette, and she uses cursed attacks to drain Claudette's strength. It begins to rain, however, which weakens her sand attacks, and Claudette emerges victorious. Menace is later turned to stone by Aldra, who says that ancient things should stay in the past. The first round is over, with Risty advancing by some unexplained method, and Nanael advancing because her foe (presumably Melona) did not appear. Nanael is dismayed that no one is placing bets on her, and uses all of Melpha's money to place a large bet on herself while in disguise, so as Melpha's roommate, she must subsist on vegetables from her garden. Meanwhile, Risty is pursuing Irma throughout the city. She corners her and is about to kill her when Echidna intervenes and shelters Irma for a while, but Aldra sets the next match so that Irma must fight Risty anyway. Tomoe is also summoned to fight Elina.
7	"Freeze! Unexpected Situations"; Transliteration: "Hyōketsu! Keisangai no Jitai" (Japanese: 氷結! 計算外の事態)	November 5, 2009
Irma looks for an opening to strike in her fight with Risty, and finds one when Risty starts having flashbacks to her old, righteous self. However, Irma misses in her killing blow, and is defeated instead. Echidna retrieves her afterwards, and the two depart together. Elina shakes Tomoe's resolve by calling her a hypocrite in regards to how she can call herself righteous while killing people. Tomoe tells Elina she has formed a bond with Leina, since they shared food and shelter on their journey, which Elina misinterprets, thinking that Tomoe has slept with Reina. Elina attacks in a frenzy, but Tomoe pulls through victorious. Ymir is pondering how best to augment Leina's sword. The next match is set: Nanael vs Airi in the Palace of Grief. Tomoe returns from her victorious battle to find a note from Shizuka, leading her to a graveyard. Shizuka reveals that she never actually left the Kouma Ninja, and has been posing as Tomoe's friend to lower her guard so she could kill her. Tomoe finally gains the will to fight her friend, and kills her. In dying, Shizuka says that being able to kill her best friend has made Tomoe stronger since these emotional bonds would only hinder her resolve as a warrior.
8	"Disgrace! The Fighting Angel"; Transliteration: "Zanki! Tatakai no Tenshi" (Japanese: 慙悸! 戦いの天使)	November 12, 2009
Airi and Nanael are both desperate to finish the match quickly, as both are starving, and begin to fight in earnest. Airi weakens Nanael by causing her to spill more of the sacred milk, which spills onto some of the petrified people in the palace. Airi runs out of time because it has been too long since she has consumed vital force and due to her desire not to do so in front of Lana, and Airi disappears. Aldra is visibly disturbed by the spilling of the sacred milk. Lana has lost another guardian, and this time goes to Ymir, deciding to help her fix Leina's sword. Lana reveals Cattleya's fate to Ymir and Leina, and Leina says she will save Cattleya. The sacred milk causes the stone Melona was encased in to crack, and she manages to escape. Nanael is then set against Leina, but Nanael is now weak from having spilled the sacred milk, and with her new sword Leina easily defeats her. Count Vance puts a plot in motion to seize the throne for himself. Melona appears before the defeated Nanael with a proposal to defeat Aldra. The next match is set: Claudette vs. Risty.
9	"True Feelings! The Duel at Castle Vance"; Transliteration: "Chūshin! Vansu-jō no Kettō" (Japanese: 衷心! ヴァンス城の決闘)	November 19, 2009
Claudette and Risty are fighting in the courtyard of Vance Castle just as Vance's army is leaving in his bid to overthrow Aldra by conventional military force. Claudette is initially victorious, knocking out Risty with a lightning bolt. She tries to dissuade the Count from his attempted overthrow, saying that it will only breed war across the continent, and reveals that Lady Maria, Vance's wife and her adoptive mother, told her to heal Vance's pain if she did not return from the Queen's Blade, and she has been serving loyally to soothe Vance's emotional scars. Vance tries to convince her to serve him again in his bid to overthrow Aldra, but she refuses, and he tells her to leave. Risty then awakens, however, and it is now apparent that she was sent to kill the Count. Claudette manages to stop her, but is eventually defeated herself when Risty collapses a roof on her. As Claudette is teleported back to Gynos, she reconciles with the Count, who then withdraws his army. Aldra calls it a success: though the Count still lives, his coup was thwarted. Claudette warns Leina that Risty has changed. Meanwhile, it is seen that Nyx has found a job as a barmaid, and that Tomoe is training fiercely, now wearing Shizuka's old horned headband. Melona, Nanael, and Melpha discuss the mysterious Aldra, and Melona steals Nanael's sacred milk.
10	"Long-cherished Desire! A Reason to Fight"; Transliteration: "Honkai! Tatakau Riyū" (Japanese: 本懐! 戦う理由)	November 26, 2009
Nanael is drinking milk to drown her sorrows at the bar where Nyx works, and Nyx tells her of the rumor about the horned monster seen in the woods. Nanael thinks it might be Melona, and goes to seek her with Melpha. She instead finds Tomoe in a dangerous mood. Elina returns home after Claudette tells her that she is the only one of the three sisters capable of serving Count Vance any more, as neither Claudette nor Leina have the will to. Nanael tries to get Leina to ambush Tomoe in the forest, but then decides to tell her what they know about Aldra so far. Between them, Nanael, Leina, and Ymir determine that Aldra has to be allied with some sort of heavenly creature because the sacred milk actually has a negative impact on the divine (and conversely a positive one on the demonic, which is how it was able to revive Melona). Melona spies on the conversation, posing as Lana. Leina is summoned at last to fight Tomoe, and they battle in the ruins of Tomoe's old shrine in Hinomoto. Tomoe's hair has turned white, and Aldra says that she is driven by the ghosts of her friends and the suffering in her heart. Tomoe says that, for Shizuka's sake, she has become a demon who will win at any cost. A desperate fight begins with Tomoe having the upper hand, utilizing a lot of powerful techniques. Leina eventually recovers and says that she cannot lose either, and that she accepts everything that has happened, including Tomoe's feelings. Tomoe rejects that, replying that one needs to be heartless to be strong. Leina triumphs, and Tomoe claims she finally understands her. Ymir uses the fight as advertising for the sword she re-forged, and sells many cheap knockoffs of it. Tomoe awakens in the Palace of Grief.
11	"Fierce Duel! The Ultimate Showdown"; Transliteration: "Kettō! Chōjō Taiketsu" (Japanese: 血闘! 頂上対決)	December 3, 2009
Tomoe demands to know why Aldra had the Kouma Ninja attack Hinomoto. Aldra says that she has been searching for her sister, and Hinomoto is the only area outside of her rule. She says burning the country to the ground would be worth it to find her sister. Aldra's past is revealed: she and her sister were outcasts for being of mixed demonic descent, and were forced to wander. Her sister mysteriously disappeared one day at the edge of a forest, and Aldra, in desperation, found a spirit without a body. The spirit inhabited Aldra's body in return for giving her great power and eternal youth. Aldra offers Tomoe rule over Hinomoto in exchange for her servitude, promising peace for Hinomoto if her sister is found, but Tomoe rejects her offer, remaining loyal to her Empress. Nanael has mysteriously returned to Heaven, and Leina and Risty finally fight. Leina fends off Risty's aggressive style, and eventually causes her to hesitate when she shows her the lucky coin she gave her. Leina scores a hit and Risty falls. Leina rushes to tend to her, and Risty temporarily breaks free from Aldra's control. Aldra's evil spirit then possesses Risty directly, however, and Risty begins strangling Leina. Leina is about to pass out when Melona appears in Aldra's throne room and coils up her body, shaking her control over Risty. Leina uses the opening to break free and eventually defeats Risty, shattering Aldra's control over her for good. Melona and Aldra fight, with Melona managing to dump what remains of the sacred milk on Aldra, weakening her, but Aldra manages to drive Melona off anyway. The final battle is set to begin: Leina vs Aldra.
12	"Ambition! The Successor to the Throne"; Transliteration: "Taishi! Gyokuza o Tsugumono" (Japanese: 大志! 玉座を継ぐ者)	December 10, 2009
Nanael makes her report to Heaven, where the Head Angel determines that Aldra has made a pact with Delmora, a fallen angel. The final battle begins, with Aldra proving to have overwhelming power. She eventually kicks Leina in the neck, making her collapse. Risty appears at the arena and cheers Leina on, causing her to get back up. Leina shows that she has adopted many of her old foes' techniques as she hits Aldra with Claudette's Thunderclap Strike and Tomoe's Warrior Kick. Just as Leina has the advantage, however, Aldra petrifies her. The crowd jeers, calling her a demon. Meanwhile, Lana has invaded the palace, trying to rescue his parents by himself. He is confronted by a Fang Assassin, but finds Airi's Scythe which still contains some of Airi's spirit. He hurls the scythe at the Assassin, and Airi snags enough of the Assassin's vital force to reconstitute herself. Nanael overhears the struggle and arrives with more sacred milk, freeing Cattleya and Owen. Melona has been hiding in the palace, though now she is tiny, and Menace is also freed. Aldra flies into a rage at the crowd's jeers and petrifies them all except Claudette, Tomoe, and Risty. Even though Leina is petrified, her spirit causes everyone's weapons to glow: even those far away like Nowa and Echidna, showing the bonds she has formed with all of them. Nanael frees Leina with more sacred milk, and she counterattacks. Delmora convinces Aldra to remove the seals on his power, but even with his unsealed power, Leina defeats Aldra, causing Delmora to emerge. It is revealed that Delmora separated Aldra from her sister so that she would despair and seek to use his power for revenge so that he could get her body in return. Nyx sees that some of those petrified have been freed, and finally shows resolve of her own by freeing Funikura herself. Nanael pours more sacred milk on Delmora, then Claudette, Tomoe, and finally Leina attack, defeating him as Leina emerges victorious. Aldra matures to adulthood in an instant since Delmora had given her eternal youth, and Tomoe tells her that she can seek her sister in Hinomoto herself. Soon after, Leina is crowned the new Queen.

== OVA Episodes ==
=== Prologue: Queen's Blade: Beautiful Fighters (JP) / Queen's Blade: Beautiful Warriors (NA) / (クイーンズブレイド ～美しき闘士たち～, Kuīnzu Bureido ~Utsukushiki Tōshi-tachi~) ===
No.	Title	Original release date
1	"Faith! Elina's Unwavering Bonds"; Transliteration: "Shinji! Erina Yuragi Naki Kizuna" (Japanese: 信義!エリナ揺るぎなき絆)	August 25, 2010
Claudette becomes queen in Leina's stead, prompting some nobles to rebel against the Vance family for seizing power. An army assaults the Vance family's castle. Elina attempts to repel them, but is defeated by Echidna. Elina insists that Leina will rescue her before her execution, which prompts Echidna to remain after being paid. Echidna toys with Elina over the next few days while Elina reminisces about how close she and Leina were when younger and how they have grown apart. Leina arrives at the last minute and saves Elina. Elina asks Leina to reenact fond childhood memories, and then challenges her to a duel, stating she cannot leave again if she loses. Leina wins, but promises to return some day, and Elina travels to assist Claudette in ruling.
2	"Difficult Parting! The Thousand Year Farewell of Alleyne"; Transliteration: "Aiseki! Arein Sennen no Wakare" (Japanese: 愛惜!アレイン千年の別れ)	September 22, 2010
Nowa and Alleyne are in the midst of their journey home to the Elven forest, where Alleyne hopes to talk the elders into allowing Nowa to return. Nowa convinces Alleyne to stop and spend a day enjoying the beach. That night, Nowa dives to search for a special stone for Alleyne, but is swept up in an undersea current. Afterwards, she encounters Nyx and a sleeping Funikura. Nowa enjoys a meal with Nyx while trying to convince her to stop depending on Funikura. Alleyne arrives and chastises Nowa, awakening Funikura who then forces Nyx to attack them. When Alleyne defeat Nyx, Funikura attempts to take control of Alleyne instead, but is thrown into the ocean by Nowa while Nyx chases after him. The next day, Nowa and Alleyne realize they have been depending on each other like Nyx depends on Funikura, and decide to part ways so that Alleyne can return home and Nowa can explore the world.
3	"Dejection! Airi's Duplicity"; Transliteration: "Yūutsu! Airi no Nishin" (Japanese: 憂鬱!アイリの二心)	October 22, 2010
Melona is tortured by the Swamp Witch for her failure during the Queen's Blade, and angrily wonders when Airi will be called back by the spell of dominance. Airi is now living as Cattleya and Lana's maid, sneaking out at night to steal essence. Lana tells her to stop and to feed on his essence instead. Reflecting afterwards, Airi decides she must leave and returns to the Swamp Witch. Melona tortures her, while Airi reveals the spell of dominance faded during the Queen's Blade, but her loyalty to the Swamp Witch remains. Nanael instructs Melpha to investigate the swamp. Melpha uses her holy powers to bring life back to a portion of the swamp, prompting Airi to attack her. Airi defeats Melpha, who comments on how conflicted Airi seems, and advises her to be true to herself. Airi tries to consume Melpha's essence, but its holy nature incapacitates her. Melpha reports her findings to Nanael, while Airi discusses Melpha's words with Melona.
4	"Restoration! Menace's Joy Palace"; Transliteration: "Saikō! Menasu Yuetsu no Ōkyū" (Japanese: 再興!メナス愉悦の王宮)	November 25, 2010
Airi and Melona travel to the rebuilt Kingdom of Amara to inform Menace that the Swamp Witch has ordered her to return. They encounter Ymir selling weapons, who also states that no citizen of the city has ever complained about Menace's rule. When they confront Menace, she refuses to return, and her scepter Setora claims the debt for her resurrection was paid by giving the Swamp Witch the treasures of Amara. Menace's life of luxury entices Melona, and she decides to stay with Menace as well. Airi tries to convince them to obey the Swamp Witch's orders, to no avail. A fight ensues that destroys the royal palace. Menace still refuses to return, and Airi and Melona return without her while concluding her servants must all be masochists.
5	"Fallen Angel! Nanael's Pleasure"; Transliteration: "Daten! Itsuraku no Nanaeru" (Japanese: 堕天!逸楽のナナエル)	February 23, 2011
Nanael invites Hachiel to the hot springs, luring her away from her post guarding the holy grapes, fruit meant for God that grants wishes when eaten. Nanael then tries to eat the grapes while Hachiel is away. Hachiel stops Nanael just before she is able to eat the grapes, and brings her before the Head Angel, who banishes her to Hades. As Nanael falls from Heaven, Melona and Airi see her and catch her instead. They torture her for information, but Nanael discovers one of the grapes fell down her shirt and swallows it. Embittered by her banishment, she wishes for power to fight Heaven, and becomes a dark angel. Airi and Melona recruit her as a servant of the Swamp Witch, but find she refuses to obey any orders. Nanael visits Melpha, but when Melpha is disturbed by her transformation, she becomes enraged and begins destroying the Swamp Witch's domain. Airi and Melona try to stop her, but are defeated, after which Nanael destroys the Swamp Witch's castle. Hachiel appears to stop Nanael, but is also defeated. Melpha arrives and declares that she is still loyal to Nanael, but Nanael continues her attack. While fighting Melpha, her memories of their times together return her to normal. Nanael wakes in heaven, where the Head Angel reveals Nanael is not banished, and all of the events were planned in order to destroy the Swamp Witch's domain.
6	"Secret Technique! The Journey Escorted By Summoned Danger"; Transliteration: "Ōgi! Sazoei no Ōma ga Tabi" (Japanese: 奥義!差添いの逢魔が旅)	March 30, 2011
Tomoe and Aldra take a ship back to Hinomoto, the only country Aldra has yet to search for her sister. However, a weakening curse is placed on Tomoe by the Swamp Witch, and the boat is attacked and destroyed by Kouma Ninja trying to abduct Aldra. Tomoe and Aldra reach shore with tattered clothes and no money, but an old woman offers to let them stay at her inn if they agree to serve her clients. When Tomoe's client molests her, she realizes what they have agreed to and knocks out both her client and Aldra's, though Aldra states that it was, "surprisingly fun." While searching for Aldra's sister the next day, Aldra becomes discouraged and runs from Tomoe, then allows the Kouma Ninja to abduct her, saying she has lost all hope. The Kouma Ninja have summoned Delmora who possesses Aldra again. Tomoe arrives to save her but must fight her instead. Shizuka's spirit appears and encourages Tomoe before pulling Delmora from Aldra, allowing Tomoe to slay him. Tomoe and Aldra then arrive at the capital to continue Aldra's search for her sister.

=== Season 1 Specials: Let's Get Everyone! Great Rampage at Gynos Academy! ===
No.	Title	Original release date
1	"Blazing Transfer Student Tomoe, Volume of Gales"; Transliteration: "Honō no Tenkōsei Tomoe Hayate-hen" (Japanese: 炎の転校生トモエ 疾風編)	June 25, 2009
2	"Blazing Transfer Student Tomoe, Volume of Surges"; Transliteration: "Honō no Tenkōsei Tomoe Dotō-hen" (Japanese: 炎の転校生トモエ 怒涛編)	July 24, 2009
3	"Elina's Super Big Sister Legend"; Transliteration: "Erina no Chō Onēsama Densetsu" (Japanese: エリナの超お姉さま伝説)	August 25, 2009
4	"The Swamp Witch Gang Gets Punished"; Transliteration: "Numachi no Majo-sama no Oshioki" (Japanese: 沼地の魔女様のお仕置き)	September 25, 2009
5	"Cattleya the Lunch Lady"; Transliteration: "Gakusoku no Katoreya-san" (Japanese: 学食のカトレアさん)	October 23, 2009
6	"Student Council President Aldra"; Transliteration: "Rōregu Seitokaichō Arudora" (Japanese: ローレグ生徒会長アルドラ)	November 25, 2009

=== Season 2 Specials: Let's Show! Great Rampage at Gynos Academy! ===
No.	Title	Original release date
7	"Yowza! Hot Fighters in a Beach Volleyball Tournament"; Transliteration: "Doki! Bitōshi Darake no Bīchibarē Taikai" (Japanese: ドキッ! 美闘士だらけのビーチバレー大会)	December 22, 2009
8	"The Ordeal of Ymir, the Little Genius Teacher"; Transliteration: "Tensai Chibikko Kyōshi Yūmiru no Junan" (Japanese: 天才チビッコ教師ユーミルの受難)	January 22, 2010
9	"Ardent Coach Alleyne"; Transliteration: "Nekketsu Shidō Arein Kōchi" (Japanese: 熱血指導アレインコーチ)	February 25, 2010
10	"The Melancholy of Melpha, the Big-breasted School Nurse"; Transliteration: "Kyonyū Hoken-i Merufa no Yūutsu" (Japanese: 巨乳保険医メルファの憂鬱)	March 25, 2010
11	"Student Council Executive Irma"; Transliteration: "Seito-kai Shikkō-bu Iruma" (Japanese: 生徒会執行部イルマ)	April 23, 2010
12	"Queen's Brassiere"; Transliteration: "Kuīnzu Burajā" (Japanese: くいーんずぶらじゃー)	May 25, 2010
