= List of Queen's Blade characters =

The characters of Queen's Blade, from left to right: Tomoe, Menace, Irma, Melona, Cattleya, Lana, Nanael, Nyx, Aldra, Claudette, Leina, Melpha, Risty, Elina, Echidna, Ymir, Airi, Alleyne, Nowa, and Shizuka.

The Queen's Blade series of visual combat books features a wide and diverse set of characters. The series focuses on a tournament called the Queen's Blade, a tournament held by the Gods every four years to determine a Queen. Only women are allowed to enter the tournament. The main character of the series is Leina, the heiress of the Vance Family and next in line to be countess, traveling to Gainos, the Queen's Capital, to participate in the Queen's Blade tournament.

The characters of Queen's Blade are designed by various popular artists such as Hirokazu Hisayuki, Eiwa, Hirotaka Akaga, and F.S.

== Characters ==
Leina (流浪の戦士 レイナ, Rurō no Senshi Reina; Exiled Warrior Leina)
Voiced by: Ayako Kawasumi (Japanese); Angora Deb (English)
Leina is the middle sister of the Vance Family, an aristocratic family of nobles, and is next in line to be the successor. However, she has no intent of becoming countess, and runs away to venture the outside world and become a warrior like her late mother Maria, eventually becoming a contender of the Queen's Blade tournament. Leina dons silver armor with brown belts across, and is armed with a longsword called "Evindil" and a buckler as weapons.

In Queen's Blade Rebellion, after winning the tournament, she gives up her title as Queen to her sister Claudette to travel the world as Maria (マリア), the Phantom Warrior. However during her travels, she contracted a mysterious disease that requires her to sleep 16 hours a day. Not only does she need to sleep that long, she also experiences sudden cases of narcolepsy, often requiring her to retreat to her hideout whenever she feels drowsiness. She aids the Rebel Army on their quest to overthrow the Queen.

Leina was created by My-HiME artist Hirokazu Hisayuki, while her CGI counterpart (known as Noble Warrior Leina (高貴なる戦士 レイナ)) is rendered by M-RS.

Risty (荒野の義賊 リスティ, Kōya no Gizoku Risuti; Bandit of the Wilderness Risty)
Voiced by: Yuko Kaida (Japanese); Jessica Paquet (English)
Risty is a thief sporting fur-lined armor and has thick, tangled red hair. She has a Robin Hood personality, and is quite greedy at times when it comes to money; the reason why she steals is that she supports a shelter for children orphaned by war, as she was once orphaned herself when she lost her family to a dispute between nobles. She hopes to win the Queen's Blade tournament to help aid the orphans. She aids Leina early in her journey in the anime adaptation by stealing the Vance Family arms and armor that once belonged to Leina's mother and giving it to her. She is armed with a morning star and has a wooden shield mounted on her left arm.

In Queen's Blade Rebellion following her loss to Leina in the semifinals, Risty returns to the forest to resume her training. This resulted in her muscle strength being increased to the point where she discards her mace for hand-to-hand combat. Following Queen Claudette's reign of terror on the Continent, she founded the Rebel Army, funded by the distribution of dark magic stones. However, she was captured by the Queen's Army after the Swamp Witch cast an "indomitable curse" that made her unable to eat or sleep during a "Beautiful Fighter Hunt". Although she has been weakened after a long stay in prison, her fighting strength still remains. Her "organizational capacity" will fulfill an important role to Annelotte.

Risty was created by the artist Eiwa.

Irma (牙の暗殺者 イルマ, Kiba no Ansatsusha Iruma; Assassin of the Fang Irma)
Voiced by: Yui Kano (Japanese); Emlyn Morinelli (English)
Irma is a young woman who is the leader of the Assassins of the Fang, the Queen's secret police charged with taking out certain contenders who might be a threat to the Continent. She has a cold and emotionless personality, and is a highly skilled fighter who uses stealth to her advantage. In the original game's story, she is ordered by Aldra to kill Leina, but changes her mind when she faces her, and tries to kill the Queen instead during the tournament; however, she is soundly defeated and sentenced to death, only to be rescued by Echidna. In the anime, it is revealed that Irma was taken in as Echidna's disciple after she lost her brother in a dispute, and seeks revenge on the Queen by killing her. However, a broken promise led Irma to bear a grudge against her former teacher. She is armed with twin daggers.

Irma was designed and illustrated by Hirotaka Akaga.

Nowa (森の番人 ノワ, Mori no Ban'nin Nowa; Forest Keeper Nowa)
Voiced by: Mikako Takahashi (Japanese); Reba Salasa (English)
Nowa is a young elf girl who protects the animals living in the forest. However, because she is half-elf and half human, she is not trusted by the elves, as humans bear a severe prejudice against them. The only elf she trusts is Alleyne, her training instructor. One of Nowa's notable traits is that she wears no panties which often disturbs the other characters. She also refers to herself in third person. Because of an incident involving one of the Swamp Witch's minions, she was later exiled from her home by the Elf Council to fight in the Queen's Blade tournament. Nowa wears bright orange armor, has pigtails, and uses an iron staff as her weapon. She also has a pet monkey named Ruh, who has the ability to stretch its body to decent lengths to protect her from harm with its rock-hard fur.

Nowa was created by Katsuzo Hirata.

Tomoe (武者巫女 トモエ, Musha-Miko Tomoe; Warrior Priestess Tomoe)
Voiced by: Mamiko Noto (Japanese); Michele Knotz (English)
Tomoe is a Warrior Priestess from the island of Hinomoto (ヒノモト/日ノ本) an alternate rendition of feudal Japan, and is a member of an elite order of warrior priestesses that protect their homeland. Her homeland is currently in a power dispute with schemers from the Imperial Court who plan to overthrow the Mikado, who is only a child. However, most of her fellow priestesses were attacked and killed by the Kouma Ninja in a plot by schemers at the Imperial Court, and Tomoe, armed with the sacred katana Kuchinawa (クチナワ), enters the Queen's Blade tournament with Shizuka by her side in order to gain the power to rescue the Mikado from their machinations and avenge her sisters. Her official English name is "Musha-Miko Tomoe", and she is named after the historical onna-musha Tomoe Gozen.

In Queen's Blade Rebellion, after awakening her ultimate skills in the tournament and returning to Hinomoto, Tomoe was acknowledged as the supreme warrior of Masakado Shrine, and was given the title of Sword Saint Priestess from the High Priest. However, during her travels in the Continent, a curse of blindness was cast on her by the Swamp Witch. Despite her loss of sight, Tomoe did not lose her burning heart and gentle smile. The day her eyes are opened again will probably be the day when the world will submit to Hinamoto's sword skills. She has yet to have a gamebook of her own so far in Rebellion.

Tomoe was designed and illustrated by the artist Eiwa.

Echidna (歴戦の傭兵 エキドナ, Rekisen no Yōhei Ekidona; Veteran Mercenary Echidna)
Voiced by: Yuki Kaida (Japanese); Trina Hilbe (English)
Echidna is a wild elf from the southern jungles with over 500 years of battle experience. In the past, she led the Assassins of the Fang and was Irma's former teacher, but is now a mercenary. She is considered a favorite to win the Queen's Blade tournament, but her current employer is unknown; all that is certain is that she herself has no interest in the throne. She was hired to protect Leina during the tournament, but she abandoned her mission to rescue Irma from her execution. She is an expert with blades, and has a pet snake named Keltan (ケルタン, Kerutan) that she wears as a thong, having it help her fight on occasion. In addition, her armor has a snake motif.

Echidna is named after the Greek mythological creature Echidna, whose half-snake appearance is also an homage to her snake-themed armor.

Echidna was created by veteran artist F.S.

Menace (古代の王女 メナス, Kodai no Ōjo Menasu; Ancient Princess Menace)
Voiced by: Yuko Goto (Japanese); Jessica Paquet (English)
Menace was a princess from the ancient Egyptian-themed Amara Kingdom (アマラ王国, Amara-Ōkoku). She once lived a life of luxury until she was betrayed by Anarista, her most trusted adviser, and died trapped in her palace as her kingdom fell into ruin. Four thousand years later, the powerful Swamp Witch resurrected her to become part of her army. However, Menace broke free from the witch's command and sets out on her own to restore the Amara Kingdom. She has a talking scepter named Setora, who does her bidding. As a result from her resurrection by the Witch, she acquired a "cursing power", black flames that she can summon from her fists to weaken her foes, with which she once hit Melona when she took Anarista's form to tease her.

Menace's name is a pun on the Ancient Egyptian ruler Menes, and shares the same katakana as the latter.

Menace is illustrated by veteran artist F.S.

Elina (近衛隊長 エリナ, Konoe taichō Erina; Captain of the Royal Guard Elina)
Voiced by: Kaori Mizuhashi (Japanese); Melissa Hope (English)
Elina is the youngest daughter of the Vance Family and Captain of the Vance Royal Guard. A prominent Queen's Blade competitor, she wears tiger-themed armor and is armed with a clawed gauntlet and spear as weapons. She was trained from a young age in all manners of martial arts, from stealth to strict military discipline, and acts as bodyguard, spy, and assassin for her father. Elina's personality is vicious and ruthless except in the company of her sisters, particularly Leina in front of whom she assumes a childlike personality. Aside from her skills with the lance, she can use "cursing words" to inflict damage directly to her opponent's head. She also has naughty thoughts about her sister Leina in which Leina wants no part in. In Queen's Blade Rebellion, Elina becomes the new leader of the Queen's Assassins of the Fang after the Vance House collapsed, and wears a brand-new set of armor while still retaining her trademark claw gauntlet and cat-eared headband from her previous armor.

Elina was created by Hirokazu Hisayuki.

Airi (冥土へ誘うもの アイリ; Infernal Temptress Airi)
Voiced by: Kanae Itō (Japanese); Michele Knotz (English)
Airi is a scythe-wielding ghost maid and is the most loyal of the Swamp Witch's minions. An expert in espionage and assassination, Airi needs to feed on vitality in order to maintain corporeal form or risk vanishing. She feeds on humans through physical contact, specifically by kissing them. In the anime, she develops a bit of a soft spot for Cattleya's son Lana and eventually befriends him. Her official English name is "Infernal Tempter Airi".

Airi was designed by Kazuhiro Takamura.

Nanael (光明の天使 ナナエル, Kōmyō no Tenshi Nanaeru; Angel of Light Nanael נֻנֻאָ)
Voiced by: Aya Hirano (Japanese); Jessica Calvello (English)
Nanael is an angel from Heaven and the overseer of the Queen's Blade tournament. However, Nanael has a hidden agenda of her own, as she plans to create a male harem and exile all of the women. Due to her foolish behavior in Heaven, she was put on probation and exiled to the mortal world by the Head Angel. As further punishment, she carries a vial of "Holy Milk", which she must not allow to be spilled; she loses powers in direct proportion to how much milk is lost from the vial. Nanael uses telekinesis in combat, and can manifest a sword called the Celestial Saber (セレスチャル・サーベル, Seresucharu Sēberu) which can fight independently of her in the anime. She also has various attacks such as the Holy Dive (ホーリーダイブ, Hōrī Daibu) and the Falling Star Kick (フォーリングスターキック, Fōringusutā Kikku). Nanael's right wing is considerably shorter than the left one, forcing her to beat each wing at a different speed in order to fly properly.

Nanael's name is a portmanteau of Nana (七) (Japanese for the number 7) and the Hebrew word for "Deity" (אל, 'El).

Nanael is illustrated by Kuchuyosai.

Cattleya (武器屋 カトレア, Bukiya Katorea; Weapon Merchant Cattleya)
Voiced by: Ryoka Yuzuki (Japanese); Eva Christensen (English)
Cattleya was an adventuress in her youth, but now manages a weapon-smithing shop in the small town of Vosk. Working as a current blacksmith, Cattleya was known as the Giant Slayer (巨人殺し, Kyojin Goroshi) for wielding an enormous greatsword with ease. Her new life started when she fell in love with another adventurer named Owen, who later became her husband, and together they had a son named Lana. However, their happiness was destroyed when Owen disappeared, and Cattleya enters the Queen's Blade to find him with Lana by her side. Her combat ability is hampered by Lana constantly clinging about her knees. While many of the female characters have big breasts, Cattleya's are exceptionally massive, measuring 120 cm (47N in) in circumference.

Cattleya was designed by Hiraku Kaneko.

Nyx (炎の使い手 ニクス, Honō no Tsukaite Nikusu; Master of Flame Nyx)
Voiced by: Rie Tanaka (Japanese); Mitzi Shanks (English)
Nyx is a young woman who, as a child, was once a peasant girl in the service of Count Vance. She was looked down upon and despised by those of higher station, and was frequently humiliated and abused by the Count's daughter, Elina. However, her life changed when she stumbled upon Funikura (フニクラ), an evil sentient staff, and was granted immeasurable magical powers. The staff also gives her a split personality: one with the kind and timid side she was born with, and the angry and vengeful side developed through the mistreatment from her career as a servant by Elina (when injected with Funikura's liquid). However, she is unable to control them effectively, and despite possessing a strong sense of justice, she is just as likely to set an entire village aflame to punish its evil leader. She takes on a gaudy clothing style mannerism so as not to be overlooked by her former tormentors, but the malevolent will of the evil staff she struggles to command continues to oppress her by sexually assaulting her. She entered the Queen's Blade tournament to prove her worth to those who have looked down on her through her whole life, as well as seek revenge against Elina, her former tormentor.

Nyx is named after the Greek goddess Nyx, who is known as the Goddess of the Night.

Nyx was designed by Masahiro Kuroki.

Melpha (帝都の聖女 メルファ, Teito no Seijo Merufa; Priestess of Gainos Melpha)
Voiced by: Sayaka Ohara (Japanese); Melissa Hope (English)
Melpha is high-ranking priestess who is widely respected by her followers as a holy woman. Compared to the other competitors, her fighting ability in close quarters is minimal (she is only armed with a spiked flail and a small shield), but through the use of the "Divine Power" (ディヴァインパワー, Divain Pawā), she possesses the ability to heal her own wounds and inflict divine punishment on her opponents through the use of provocative "Holy Poses" (聖なるポーズ, Seinaru Pōzu). In the anime, Melpha idolizes Nanael as an Angel of Heaven, which Nanael abuses in order to boss Melpha around as a servant. Much like Cattleya, her breasts are larger than normal.

Melpha was illustrated by popular doujin artist and character designer Zundarepon.

Shizuka (甲魔忍軍頭領 シズカ; Kouma Ninja Chieftain Shizuka)
Voiced by: Hitomi Nabatame (Japanese); Georgette Reilly (English)
Shizuka is a kunoichi and the leader of Hinomoto's Kouma Ninjas (甲魔忍軍, Kōma Ningun). A money-grubbing assassin, she couldn't care less about the affairs of the battle as long as she gets paid; she just hates working hard in general and instead has a personal group of ninjas to aid her. It is implied through the original's game story that in the beginning, she was hired by Aldra to get rid of Tomoe. However, when she fought Tomoe and lost to her greater skill, she became her aide-de-camp as a result in her quest to free Hinomoto. She seems to have defected from her evil ways as a result of this, becoming more of an easygoing person in addition to abandoning her leadership over the Kouma. In the second anime adaptation, it is revealed that she has an intent of killing Tomoe by posing as her friend, and was later killed by the latter with her horned headband given as a trophy. This, however, turned out to be a lie as Shizuka wanted to kill off Tomoe's only weakness, and was willing to sacrifice her own life to do so. This makes her the first official character to die on-screen in the anime and in the Queen's Blade franchise. Shizuka does not have a game book of her own, yet has appeared in all other media. Her official English name is "Rogue Ninja Shizuka".

Shizuka was created by Eiwa.

Melona (千変の刺客 メローナ, Senpen no Shikaku Merōna; Protean Assassin Melona)
Voiced by: Rie Kugimiya (Japanese); Darla Chaney (English)
Melona is a shapeshifting, magic-using girl with a playful, yet sadistic personality who has the ability to take on any physical form, and is the Swamp Witch's strongest minion. She is composed of a pink liquid substance and can manipulate her constitution to create objects, move from place to place, and imitate people by taking on their shape while assuming their fighting skills and abilities. Because she is made of liquid, she is immune to any slicing attack, where her body would just regenerate. One noticeable use of her shapeshifting ability is her hair, which turns into hands that hold up her breasts and cover her nipples. Her primary offense is squirting a volatile substance from her breasts, as well as wielding a sword created from her hair.

Melona is created by F.S.

Claudette (雷雲の将 クローデット, Raiun no Shō Kurōdetto; Lord of Thundercloud Claudette)
Voiced by: Atsuko Tanaka (Japanese); Gladys Weiner (English)
Claudette is the oldest daughter of the Vance Family. Because she is an illegitimate child of the Count, she is not in the line of succession, and was raised without the care and devotion shown to her two half-sisters. She is charged with protecting Leina, the future countess, and wields a zweihander named Thunderclap which she can use to control lightning.

In Queen's Blade Rebellion, Claudette became Queen after Leina renounces the title to continue wandering the world. However, her strictness led to her becoming a ruthless tyrant, banning the Queen's Blade tournament as she proclaims herself to be "chosen by the Gods." Along with a new set of armor, her Thunderclap sword also gained a significant upgrade through the power of the "Wizard Stones" (courtesy of Ymir), and can now manipulate lightning without readying the sword.

Claudette's name is taken from the ancient Roman Emperor Claudius.

Claudette was designed by artist Hirokazu Hisayuki, with illustrations in the gamebooks provided by 2-go.

Ymir (鋼鉄姫 ユーミル, Kōtetsu Hime Yūmiru; Iron Princess Ymir)
Voiced by: Ayaka Saito (Japanese); Kate Vincent (English)
Ymir is the daughter of the Dwarven King who runs the Iron Mountain weapon factory, which is known for forging top-quality weapons. Ymir entered the Queen's Blade tournament to prove the superiority of Dwarven weapons. In the anime, she has a strong one-sided rivalry with Cattleya as a weaponsmith. Despite her childlike appearance, Ymir is actually older than she looks, evidenced by her speech pattern which is reminiscent to that of an old man. She wields a massive battle axe and wears a special gauntlet that increases her strength, and spends most of her time hawking cheap weapons at inflated rates to the unsuspecting. Despite her strength, she has an intense fear of snakes, specifically from Echidna's snake Keltan.

In Queen's Blade Rebellion, she had her weapon broken during a fight with Claudette, and by her clan's law is forced to submit to her demands. After finding out her surprising talent in planning, she became one of Queen Claudette's closest associates and, along with her rich knowledge of alchemy, invented various items to strengthen the Queen's Army. She became much colder in personality, no longer being afraid of snakes, and rumors from those who knew the often teary-eyed Ymir say she is now another person entirely. She wields twin battle axes as weapons, and wears a new set of Dwarven armor modeled after the Gothic Lolita style of fashion.

Ymir's name is taken from Norse mythological being Ymir.

Ymir was illustrated by Natsuki Mibu.

Alleyne (戦闘教官 アレイン, Sentō Kyōkan Arein; Fighting Master Alleyne)
Voiced by: Eri Kitamura (Japanese); Kelli Sahne (Season 1), Kenzie Brooke (Season 2) (English)
Alleyne is a 1000-year-old elf and the most seasoned veteran warrior of a tribe of forest elves. She is taciturn and blunt in her dealings with others (her most notable trait is when she gives points to her opponents based on their performance), and had a long relationship with Echidna, whom she often chastises for her loose ways but is mocked in return for her inexperience with men, being called "The Thousand Year-Old Virgin". The appearance of the half-elf Nowa in the forest elf community marked a turning point for Alleyne, who appointed her as "Guardian of the Forest". The Elf Council did not approve, however, and banished her from the village with the excuse that she must join the Queen's Blade tournament. Unwilling to abandon Nowa, Alleyne secretly sets out for the tournament as well. Following the tournament, she and Nowa went their separate ways.

In Queen's Blade Rebellion, it is revealed that Alleyne is the last elf of her tribe following a genocide in her forest by the Swamp Witch's forces, and that the Swamp Witch placed a curse on Alleyne that forbids her from leaving the forest. During that time, she met Annelotte, who was trying to escape from Queen Claudette's Assassins. After tending to her wounds, she, after some persuasion from Annelotte, takes her in as her second disciple. She was the first to witness Annelotte's demon powers when a lightning storm struck the forest.

Alleyne is illustrated by MatsuRyu.

Aldra (逢魔の女王 アルドラ, Oma no Jo Ō Arudora; Bewitched Queen Aldra)
Voiced by: Miyū Takeuchi (Exiled Virgin–Beautiful Fighters), Ayana Taketatsu (Rebellion) (Japanese); Kenzie Brooke (English)
Aldra is the victor of the past two Queen's Blade tournaments and reigning Queen of the Continent. As the child of the Pope, the highest religious leader, and the daughter of the Devil King of the Netherworld, she is a cursed half-demon who, along with her sister, was persecuted everywhere they went. One day while searching for some food, Aldra's sister disappeared. She soon made contact with the fallen angel Delmore, whom she made a contract with and gained demonic powers at the cost of her growth. She then became determined to win the Queen's Blade and use her power to search for her lost sister. Because of her current position as Queen, she would often have fits of paranoia over the fact that someone might overthrow her, which led her to establishing the Assassins of the Fang. Her official English name is "The Queen Aldra".

Aldra has the ability to encase people in an amber-like prison through the use of her "Evil Eye", which is located on her right side hidden under an armored eyepatch. For close combat, she wields a broadsword called the Demon's Blade (デーモンズブレイド, Dēmonzu Bureido), and has a hidden weapon called the Secret Cleaver located in the groin area of her armor, which pays allusion to BDSM. She also has the ability to summon shikigami called Minions to slow down her opponents.

In Queen's Blade Rebellion, after losing the title of Queen to Leina (later Claudette), Delmore, the source of her powers, was stripped from her body, and reverted to her true adult form after her defeat. She later embarked on a journey to find her lost sister, but suffered from amnesia along the way. During her journey, she fell in love with a man and was later married. Her happy life was short-lived when the war between the Queen's Army and the Rebel Army spread throughout the whole Continent. To protect her beloved husband, she was determined to throw herself in the fight, and made a contract with the Underworld dwellers Belphe (ベルフェ, Berufe) and Dogor (ドゴール, Dogōru) (an amalgamation of the demon Belphegor). However, both demons are secretly plotting to eat Aldra when given the opportunity. Her current outfit pays homage to the "naked apron" anime stereotype that is usually found in ecchi anime and manga.

Aldra was created by the popular illustrator and game character designer Kantaka.

== Video game characters ==
=== Main characters ===
Cute (キュート, Kyūto)
Voiced by: Momoko Saito
The main heroine of Queen's Blade: Spiral Chaos. She is described as a Novice fighter, but over the course of the game, the players will learn of Cute's mysterious being tied with special powers that can decide the fate of the world. Due to her small bust size, some cutscenes show her with low-esteem. Illustrated by Poyoyon Rock.

Jean (ジャン, Jan)
Voiced by: Hiroshi Kamiya
A young and rather cowardly sorcerer employed by Cute's family as her bodyguard in the Queen's Blade Tournament. Despite being a coward, Jean is skilled at capturing Gal Monsters and does not hesitate to put his life on the line for the sake of Cute. Due to being surrounded by several well-endowed and scantily-clad women, Jean is prone to perverse delusions and excessive drooling. Amongst the ladies, he took the most interest with Tomoe, even calling her "Tomoe-chan" out of affection. Illustrated by Poyoyon Rock.

=== Antagonists ===
Dora (ドーラ, Dōra)
Voiced by: Yōko Hikasa
A well-endowed sorceress in the employ of the two Dragon goddesses. In the game, when she and Lamica are unable to defeat Cute and the others, she enlisted the help of the Amaran Princess Menace.

Lamica (ラミカ, Ramika)
Voiced by: Sayuri Yahagi
The boisterous young vampire partner of Dora. She is encountered several times in the game and has the habit of taunting Cute and the others into a fight.

=== Gal Monsters ===
Püia (ピュイア, Pyuia)
Voiced by: Ayumi Fujimura
One of the three kinds of Gal Monsters which Jean can capture in the game. Püia is a harpy.

Arane (アラネ)
Voiced by: Satomi Sato
One of the three kinds of Gal Monsters which Jean can capture in the game. The Arachne appears as a young and cold-hearted girl in a yukata with spider leg-like hair which she uses in attacking.

Cerate (ケラット, Keratto)
Voiced by: Yuka Iguchi
One of the three kinds of Gal Monsters which Jean can capture in the game. Cerate is a fierce dinosaur with an affection for her captor.

== Other characters ==
Count Vance (ヴァンス伯爵, Vansu Hakushaku)
Voiced by: Atsushi Ono (Japanese); Dan Green (English)
Count Vance is the father of Claudette, Leina and Elina.

Maria (剣聖 マリア, Kensei Maria; Master Swordswoman Maria)
Voiced by: Sanae Kobayashi (Japanese); Angora Deb (English)
The matriarch of the Vance Family and the wife of Count Vance. Wearing armor with a tiger motif, she had formidable sword skills, and the same "cursing words" Elina uses. She participated in the last Queen's Blade tournament, but lost her life, resulting in the Count's contempt for the tournament. Her last request to Claudette was to ease her husband's burden.

Anarista (アマラの蠍 アナリスタ, Amara no Sasori Anarisuta; Scorpion of Amara Anarista)
A great warrior in the ancient Amara kingdom, hired by Menace's father to teach her daughter about unarmed martial arts. Seduced by the king of the rival kingdom Saddler (サドラー, Sadorā) with promises to become the next Queen, she betrayed Amara by bringing a huge gift filled with rival soldiers, in a manner most reminiscent of the Trojan Horse. After Menace noticed the invasion and asked for her help to save her dying father, Anarista revealed her betrayal, defeated her and humiliated her before killing Menace.

Setora (セトラ)
Voiced by: Fumihiko Tachiki (Japanese); Billy Regan (English)
A "Living Scepter" with the head of a cat and Menace's most loyal servant. He is very perverse towards other women, and seems to find an interest in Shizuka after he rescued her in the first anime adaptation. Exclusively in the English anime, he uses sexual euphemisms. His name is a portmanteau of "Scepter" (his form) and "Tora", the Japanese word for tiger (his motif).

Swamp Witch (沼地の魔女, Numachi no Majō)
A mysterious and powerful witch who is never seen in the story, yet her influence is felt throughout the land. She is the master of Airi and Melona, and is responsible for Menace's resurrection. During the Queen's Blade story, she sends Airi, Melona and Menace, in the guise of contestants, to disrupt the Queen's Blade tournament. In the anime, the Swamp Witch's minions communicate with her by magic.

In Queen's Blade Rebellion, the Swamp Witch's ambitions to eventually rule the Continent went a step further. She had resurrected and empowered the long-dead pirate Liliana to lead an army of undead. She was also responsible for the genocide of the elves and for inflicting magical curses on Alleyne (restricting her movements to within her forest), Risty (making her unable to eat or sleep during a "Beautiful Fighter Hunt") and Tomoe (leaving her blind). It was also revealed that the Swamp Witch owned a gladiatorial arena where slaves and monsters fought each other. She has been manipulating Queen Claudette's reign behind the shadows in an attempt to eliminate those who could pose a threat to her own ambitions (i.e. the Rebel Army) in the future.

The Swamp Witch makes a full appearance in Rebellion as Werbellia, the demonic mother of Aldra and Annelotte.

Hachiel (ハチエル, Hachieru)
Voiced by: Kokoro Kikuchi (Japanese); Elizabeth Williams (English)
Nanael's best friend.

Head Angel (天使長, Tenshichō)
Voiced by: Takako Honda (Japanese); Allison Cohen (English)
The leader of all of the angels in Heaven and the organizer of the Queen's Blade tournament.

Lana (ラナ, Rana)
Voiced by: Rie Kugimiya (Japanese); Eva Christensen (English)
The son of Owen and Cattelya, he is usually seen near or attached to Cattelya's leg as she is his only remaining parent and he is far too young and timid to move on his own. During the events of the anime, he would start to gain some courage when bravely fighting against Melona when he went to rescue Cattelya and (unbeknownst to him) his father Owen during the finals of the Queen's Blade tournament. During the tournament, he makes friends with Airi along with some of the other female competitors.

Delmore (堕天使 デルモア, Datenshi Derumoa; Fallen Angel Delmore)
Voiced by: Akira Ishida
Aldra's master and one of the key demons from Hades. He imbues Aldra with some of his power at the cost of her forever staying as a child (which was when she went to go look for her long-lost sister). Aldra would finally reject him after losing to Leina in the finals and learning the truth behind her sister's disappearance, thus leaving him to search for someone else stronger. In Beautiful Fighters, he forces Aldra to make another contract with him when he captures her while she and Tomoe were visiting Tomoe's home. Aldra would once again break Delmore's control over her and, with the help of Shizuka's ghost (who came back to stop her rampaging brother), was finally able to seal away Delmore once and for all.

Owen (オーウェン, Ōwen)
Cattelya's husband and Lana's father. Known as the Dragon Smiter (竜を討つ者), he was once a great traveler and hunter who had gone looking for a mystical treasure, being forced to leave the at-the-time-pregnant Cattelya to tend for herself and their child. It would come to pass he met Queen Aldra and was encased in amber by the Queen's Evil Eye. After being freed by his son Lana, Owen, Cattelya and Lana return to Cattelya's village to live out their lives. Owen is voiced by Wayne Grayson in English.

Hans (土産物屋 ハンス, Miyagemonoya Hansu; Souvenir Shop Manager Hans)
The owner of a souvenir shop in Gainos. Setora was displayed in his shop before Menace found him. He used to sell figurines of the Queen's Blade participants, but was discovered by Menace and Setora and threatened into handing them the money he had amassed, that they used to resurrect the Kingdom of Amara. He also acts as Hobby Japan's spokesperson, as all the posts in Queen's Blade's Staff Blog are credited to him.

Frolell (フロレル, Furoreru)
A young boy who works as a servant of the Vance Family. He was ordered by Claudette to accompany and assist her younger sister Elina (much to her displeasure). At first Elina objects him from accompanying her as she feels that he will be a burden to her, but slowly she warms up to him. He is an intelligent and brave boy with a devoted, obedient but shy personality. He seems to look up to the Vance Sisters (especially Elina), who seem to act like sisterly or motherly figures to him. He possess some skills in swordsmanship and can be very strong at times. He first appears in the manga Queen's Blade: Hide & Seek.

Sevel (セヴェル, Severu)
Voiced by: Yōko Honda

Hebtael (ヘブタエル, Hebutaeru)
Voiced by: Satomi Sato, Kana Akutsu (OVA)

Ahatoel (アハトエル, Ahatoeru)
Voiced by: Sayuri Yahagi
