= Queen's Blade =

Japanese manga and anime series

- Cover of the first series of the Queen's Blade gamebooks released by Hobby Japan featuring Leina

クイーンズブレイド (Kuīnzu Bureido)
- Genre: Adventure, fantasy
- Light novel

Queen's Blade: Sword of Unicorn
- Written by: Eiji Okita
- Illustrated by: Eiwa
- Published by: Hobby Japan
- Imprint: HJ Bunko
- Original run: May 1, 2007 – November 1, 2008
- Volumes: 5
- Light novel

Gekitō! Queen's Blade
- Written by: Eiji Okita
- Illustrated by: Hirotaka Akaga
- Published by: Hobby Japan
- Imprint: HJ Bunko
- Published: March 1, 2008
- Manga

Queen's Blade: Hide & Seek
- Illustrated by: Iku Nanazuki
- Published by: Kadokawa Shoten
- Magazine: Comp Ace
- Original run: October 26, 2007 – May 26, 2010
- Volumes: 5
- Manga

Queen's Blade Struggle
- Illustrated by: AstroguyII
- Published by: ASCII Media Works
- Magazine: Dengeki Black Maoh
- Original run: March 27, 2009 – present
- Volumes: 4
- Manga

Queen's Blade: Exiled Warrior
- Illustrated by: Kabao Kikkawa
- Published by: Media Factory
- Magazine: Monthly Comic Alive
- Original run: February 23, 2009 – January 23, 2010
- Volumes: 3
- Anime television series

Queen's Blade: The Exiled Virgin
- Directed by: Kinji Yoshimoto
- Produced by: Hiromasa Minami; Hirotaka Yoshida; Kazuaki Morijiri; Masaaki Yokota; Shinsaku Tanaka
- Written by: Kinji Yoshimoto
- Music by: Masaru Yokoyama
- Studio: ARMS
- Licensed by: AUS: Siren Visual; NA: Media Blasters
- Original network: AT-X, Chiba TV, SUN, Tokyo MX
- English network: US: Toku
- Original run: April 2, 2009 – June 18, 2009
- Episodes: 12
Further information
Light novel
Queen's Blade: Exiled Warrior
Written by	Eiji Okita
Illustrated by	Tsutomu Miyazawa
Published by	Media Factory
Imprint	MF Bunko J
Original run	August 1, 2009 – October 1, 2009
Volumes	2
Anime television series
Queen's Blade 2: The Evil Eye
Directed by	Kinji Yoshimoto
Written by	Takao Yoshioka
Music by	Masaru Yokoyama
Studio	ARMS
Licensed by	NA: Media Blasters
Original network	AT-X, Tokyo MX, Chiba TV, Sun Television
Original run	September 24, 2009 – December 10, 2009
Episodes	12
Video game
Queen's Blade: Spiral Chaos
Developer	Bandai Namco Games
Publisher	Bandai Namco Games
Genre	RPG
Platform	PlayStation Portable
Released	December 17, 2009
Original video animation
Queen's Blade: Beautiful Warriors
Directed by	Kinji Yoshimoto
Written by	Hideki Shirone; Michiko Ito; Takao Yoshioka; Toshimitsu Takeuchi
Music by	Masaru Yokoyama
Studio	ARMS
Licensed by	NA: Sentai Filmworks
Released	August 8, 2010 – January 9, 2011
Runtime	30 minutes (per episode)
Episodes	6
Original video animation
Vanquished Queens
Directed by	Shin Itagaki
Written by	Kingetsu Ryūnosuke
Studio	Hoods Entertainment
Released	March 29, 2013 – September 30, 2014
Episodes	4
Original video animation
Queen's Blade: Unlimited
Directed by	Gabi Kisaragi
Written by	Kingetsu Ryūnosuke; Okita Eiji
Music by	Miracle Bus
Studio	FORTES
Released	July 13, 2018 – February 28, 2020
Episodes	2
Manga
Nanashi no Tensei
Written by	Akira Hizuki
Illustrated by	Minmi Tachibana
Published by	Hobby Japan
Original run	April 15, 2024 – present

Queen's Blade (Japanese: クイーンズブレイド, Hepburn: Kuīnzu Bureido) is a Japanese series of visual combat books published by Hobby Japan inspired by the licensed works from Firelight Game Company's Lost Worlds. The overall plot of the game revolves around a tournament called the Queen's Blade, which is held once every four years to determine a Queen.

Since its original release, the series has evolved into a media franchise, spanning four manga adaptations, three anime adaptations, three light novels, and a video game adaptation. Figures of the characters made by various manufacturers, such as Kaiyodo with their Revoltech series, have also been produced along with several memorabilia. A sequel series, Queen's Blade Rebellion, was launched in 2009.

== Story ==
In the Continent, a tournament called the Queen's Blade is held once every four years to determine the most beautiful and powerful Queen. Held in Gainos (ガイノス, Gainosu; also Gynos), the Queen's Capital, various fighters from all over the Continent travel to the Capital to defeat Aldra, the current Queen. The overall story of Queen's Blade focuses on Leina, the heiress of the esteemed Vance Family and next in line for the throne, as she travels to Gainos, encountering many other warriors also competing in the Queen's Blade for their own intentions.

The original gamebooks feature characters designed by many popular artists, including Hirokazu Hisayuki (My-HiME), Kazuhiro Takamura, and Eiwa.

== Media ==
=== Gamebooks ===
- Series 1 (Leina and Risty): Released November 25, 2005.
- Series 2 (Irma and Nowa): Released December 28, 2005.
- Series 3 (Tomoe and Echidna): Released June 9, 2006.
- Series 4 (Menace and Elina): Released September 29, 2006.
- Series 5 (Airi and Leina 3D): Released December 22, 2006.
- Series 6 (Nanael and Cattleya): Released March 16, 2007.
- Series 7 (Nyx and Melpha): Released June 29, 2007.
- Series 8 (Melona and Claudette): Released October 18, 2007.
- Series 9 (Ymir): Released February 15, 2008.
  - A limited-edition second-player color version of Ymir was distributed exclusively by online hobby shop Post Channel.
- Series 10 (Aldra and Alleyne): Released June 20, 2008.

At Anime Expo 2010, Hobby Japan announced that English translations of the gamebooks will be released in North America. There exist English versions for the characters Alleyne, Melona, Nanael and Tomoe.

=== Anime ===
An anime adaptation of Queen's Blade, entitled Queen's Blade: Wandering Warrior (クイーンズブレイド 流浪の戦士, Kuīnzu Bureido: Rurō no Senshi), was produced by ARMS. Directed by Kinji Yoshimoto, the anime aired twelve episodes in Japan from April 2 to June 18, 2009, on AT-X, with subsequent broadcasts on Chiba TV, Sun Television, and Tokyo MX. The series aired uncensored on AT-X, while being heavily censored on other channels. Six DVD and Blu-ray volumes were released by Media Factory between June 25, 2009, and November 25, 2009, each DVD/BD volume containing one of six OVAs. A second season, Queen's Blade: Inheritor of the Throne (クイーンズブレイド 玉座を継ぐ者, Kuīnzu Bureido: Gyokuza o Tsugumono), aired on AT-X and other channels from September 24 to December 10, 2009. Six DVD/BD volumes were released by Media Factory between December 22, 2009, and May 25, 2010, each containing six OVAs which continue from the first six.

An OVA series, called Queen's Blade: Beautiful Fighters (クイーンズブレイド ～美しき闘士たち～, Kuīnzu Bureido ~Utsukushiki Tōshi-tachi~), was announced on the May issue of Monthly Hobby Japan. A prelude to events of Queen's Blade Rebellion, the series takes place after the events of the Queen's Blade tournament and chronicles the characters on their separate paths. The episodes were released on six DVD and Blu-ray volumes from August 25, 2010, to March 30, 2011.

In North America, the first and second anime adaptations are licensed by Media Blasters under the respective titles Queen's Blade: The Exiled Virgin and Queen's Blade 2: The Evil Eye. The first season was released between May 18 and October 26, 2010, as three DVD volumes, each containing four episodes, while the second season was released between May 24, 2011, and July 19, 2011, as two half-series volumes. Blu-ray box sets of the two seasons were later released on February 15, 2011, and September 27, 2011, respectively. Sentai Filmworks has licensed the Beautiful Fighters OVAs and will release them on digital and home video formats. On May 11, 2017, the channel Toku announced that the first season would be broadcast on its channel beginning June 5, 2017, through August 21, 2017.

The opening theme for the first season is "Get the Door" by Rie Ohashi, while the ending theme is "Memories and Promises" (思い出と約束, Omoide to Yakusoku) by Ayako Kawasumi, Mamiko Noto, and Aya Hirano, the voices for Leina, Tomoe, and Nanael, respectively. The opening theme for the second season is "Empty Sky" (墜ちない空, Ochinai Sora) by ENA while the ending theme is "buddy-body" by Rie Kugimiya, Yuko Goto, and Kanae Ito, the voices for Melona, Menace, and Airi, respectively. For the OVA, the ending theme is "Bitōshi Carnival: Taoreru Toki wa Maemuki ni" (美闘士カーニバル～たおれる時は前向きに～) by All 19 Beautiful Warriors, consisting of the entire female voice cast of the series.

=== Manga ===
An anthology comic of Queen's Blade was published by Hobby Japan with four volumes released between April 25, 2007, and February 25, 2008. A manga adaptation centered on Leina illustrated by Kabao Kikkawa was serialized in the October 2008 issue of Media Factory's seinen manga magazine Monthly Comic Alive. Three volumes were released between February 2, 2009, and January 23, 2010, under Media Factory's Alive Comics imprint.

Another manga adaptation of Queen's Blade illustrated by Iku Nanazuki called Queen's Blade: Hide & Seek (クイーンズブレイド -Hide&Seek-), began serialization in the December 2007 issue of Comp Ace. A spinoff of the original, the series centers on Elina searching for her older sister Leina, and it introduces Frolell, a servant of the Vance family who travels with Elina on her journey to bring Leina back. Five volumes were released by Kadokawa Shoten between June 26, 2008, and June 26, 2010.

A third manga adaptation, called Queen's Blade Struggle (クイーンズブレイド ストラグル, Kuīnzu Bureido Sutoraguru), is illustrated by AstroguyII and began serialization in the December 2007 issue of Dengeki Black Maoh, and continued in Dengeki Maoh after the latter stopped circulation, albeit with new chapters delivered bimonthly. The first volume was released by ASCII Media Works on March 27, 2009, with four volumes currently available as of February 27, 2012, under their Dengeki Comics imprint.

=== Light novels ===
A light novel adaptation of Queen's Blade, called Queen's Blade: Sword of Unicorn (クイーンズブレイド ソード・オブ・ユニコーン, Kuīnzu Bureido: Sōdo obu Yunikōn), is written by Eiji Okita with illustrations by Eiwa. The first volume was released on April 27, 2007, by Hobby Japan under their HJ Bunko imprint, and released five volumes until November 1, 2008. A bonus novel called Fierce Battle! Queen's Blade (激闘！クイーンズブレイド, Gekitō! Kuīnzu Bureido) was published on March 1, 2008, with illustrations provided by Hirotaka Akaga.

A light novel based on the first anime series, written by Okita and illustrated by Tsumotu Miyazawa, was also published by Hobby Japan, and released two volumes between August 1, 2009, and October 1, 2009.

=== Video games ===
A role-playing game called Queen's Blade: Spiral Chaos (クイーンズブレイド スパイラルカオス, Kuīnzu Bureido: Supairaru Kaosu) was developed by Bandai Namco Games for the PlayStation Portable. It was released on December 17, 2009, and features all-new characters and an original storyline exclusive to the game in addition to recurring characters from the original series. A limited edition of the game, called the Gekitō Pack, was also released, featuring a Cute figure from Figma and a bonus character voice CD. A sequel, Queen's Gate: Spiral Chaos, was released as part of the Queen's Gate series of works. A rogue-lite deck-building game, Queen's Blade Re:build, was released on Steam on July 2026, and on Nintendo Switch on October that same year.

=== Other ===
- Queen's Blade Fan Disc: character dress-up video game published in 2006.
- Queen's Blade i: A mobile phone game using game rules from the combat picture book series. Service host by DigitalMediaLab and it supports FOMA 703i and 901i series. Carriers include NTT DoCoMo. The service seems to have been discontinued since.
- Queen's Blade Collection Card ver.2.0: A currently-produced card series with individual biography cards for each character, plus artwork cards and bubble gum.
- Three visual books called Queen's Blade: Beautiful Fighters Biographies (クイーンズブレイド美闘士列伝, Kuīnzu Bureido: Bitōshi Retsuden) were released by Hobby Japan, narrating the backstories of the fighters before the tournament:
  - Picture Scroll of the Musha-Miko (武者巫女絵巻, Musha-Miko Emaki), illustrated by Eiwa, released on Abril 28, 2007.
  - Tome of the Ancient Princess (古代王女の書, Kodai Ōjo no Sho), illustrated by F.S., released on February 15, 2008.
  - Adventure of the Exiled Warrior (流浪の戦士冒険記, Rurō no Senshi Bōken Ki), illustrated by Hirokazu Hisayuki, released on February 28, 2009.
- A databook called Queen's Blade: Perfect Visual Book (クイーンズブレイド パーフェクトビジュアルブック, Kuīnzu Bureido: Pāfekuto Bijuaru Bukku) was released by Hobby Japan on June 27, 2009. Aside from compiled illustrations from other official sources, the databook contains extended profiles on the fighters, a "world guide" detailing many of the Continent's locations and the resolutions of each character's storyarc. The book is licensed under the title Queen's Blade: Perfect Visual Collection in North America by Vertical Publishing.
- Queen's Blade: The Duel: A collectible card game with Queen's Blade characters, later expanded with a few of the Queen's Gate and Queen's Blade Rebellion characters and renamed to Duel System TCG. Released by Megahobby in 2008.
- Queen's Blade: The Conquest: A RPG browser game featuring the Queen's Blade characters made by Aiming in 2012, with plans to be expanded with Rebellion characters. It is free-to-play, though items can be bought to progress faster and reduce cooldown time.
- Queen's Blade Limit Break: An RPG browser game launched on the HTML5 game platform, G123 operated by CTW Inc. in 2022.

== Sequels and spin-offs ==
The original game book series was followed by a sequel series titled Queen's Blade Rebellion (クイーンズブレイド リベリオン, Kuīnzu Bureido Riberion), featuring all-new characters as well as reinterpretations of previous characters, and a supplement called Queen's Gate (クイーンズゲイト, Kuīnzu Geito), featuring licensed characters from other games and series.

A spin-off series of original video animations, titled Queen's Blade Grimoire (クイーンズブレイド グリムワール, Kuīnzu Bureido Gurimuwāru), was launched in 2016. The anime is set in a parallel universe inspired by fairy tales.

A reboot, titled Queen's Blade Unlimited (クイーンズブレイド UNLIMITED), was announced in 2017.

A spin-off full-color vertical-scrolling manga series, titled Nanashi no Tensei, began serialization on Hobby Japan's Fire Cross website on April 15, 2024. The series is written by Akira Hizuki and illustrated by Minmi Tachibana.
