= Lost Worlds (gamebook) =

1983 gamebook by Alfred Leonardi

Lost Worlds - Skeleton with Scimitar and Shield

Lost Worlds is a "combat picture book game" designed and trademarked by Alfred Leonardi and originally published in 1983 by Nova Game Designs. The game has had many publishers, including Chessex, Emithill, Flying Buffalo, and Greysea.

== Resurgence ==
A minor resurgence in published books occurred in 2004, with five new titles published in 2004 (four of them by a new licensee, 1% Inspiration Games), a further two published in June 2005 (both with photo illustrations rather than graphics), and others early in 2007 and 2008. Many of the older books are now out of print, although Firelight Game Company has said they may be reprinting some of the early books.

== Gameplay ==
Play requires two players and at least two "visual combat books", with each player choosing a character (i.e., a book) from those available. At the start of play, each player removes the character sheet for that character from their book and hands the book to their opponent. The character sheet lists the various combat actions which the character can take during the battle. The combat book lists the effects of the attacks in tables, and serves as a visual reference for what the other player is doing. Hence, each player views entries in the book from a first-person perspective, seeing only their opponent and not themselves.

During each turn or combat phase, players secretly select an action from those shown on their card, possibly influenced by the results of previous turns. Players then simultaneously reveal their intended action, by number, to each other. Using the character sheet to cross-reference their action with that of their opponent, players then turn to a specific entry in the book they are holding in order to determine the results. These effects may include hit point loss (i.e., a wound), as well as any restrictions on the opponent's next move (which is read aloud to them). The first character to reduce their opponent to zero hit points wins.

To add complexity and variety, certain characters have special abilities—the Cave Troll and the Unicorn, for example, can Regenerate; several characters (beginning with the Fighter-Mage) can use Magic Spells (although there are now 3 different spell systems, formulated by different publishers); several can infect an opponent with either poison or disease, which then cause damage automatically in every round of combat. Some characters can fly; others have magic weapons.

In addition to Magic (represented by cards), there are also cards for Tactics and Luck, with characters having differing access to these, depending on their statistics.

== Spinoffs ==
There is also a further series of books, of emphatically female fighter-types, under the collective title of Queen's Blade, published from late 2005 by Hobby Japan. With more than 20 books and characters designed by popular Japanese artists and character designers. As of December 2007 a second series, Queen's Gate, was introduced, featuring characters from Japanese visual media, and in October 2008 Hobby Japan announced four further characters in a sub-set of the original series (Queen's Blade Rebellion).

Jill Leonardi, the daughter of the original game designer Alfred Leonardi, has been designing new character matrices for the Queen's Blade series since 2010. In 2012, Jill founded Firelight Game Company with partner Todd Broadbent with plans to release new characters under the brand of Legend's Gauntlet in a new but fully compatible format.

The Leonardi move-matrix system has also been "borrowed" by other publishers, notably BattleBooks and Games Workshop as the engine to drive their own combat picture book games.

== Reception ==
Steve Jackson reviewed Lost Worlds for Fantasy Gamer magazine and stated that "On the whole, I am immensely impressed with Lost Worlds. It's fun, it's realistic, and it's easy. In fact, I could almost recommend reserving Lost Worlds for those situations where you couldn't play any other game! I've played on airplanes, over dinner in restaurants, and even while walking down the sidewalk, It's all in those two little books, a couple of cards — and your head."

Chris Hunter reviewed Lost Worlds for Imagine magazine, and stated that "All in all, Lost Worlds is a quick, fun system, if you can ignore its shortcomings [...] but I cannot imagine myself playing much more than a quick battle or two while waiting to start an evening's role-playing."

Ian Waddelow reviewed Lost Worlds for White Dwarf #52, giving it an overall rating of 6 out of 10, and stated that "The game is easy and good fun but it has limited appeal. It would be fun to throw two books at a couple of players when running a RPG as a change from endless die-rolling, but it does not warrant a great deal of thought, nor does it allow for any real strategy. Lost Worlds is a good game for lunchtime or to take down to the pub."

In the May 1984 edition of Dragon (Issue 85), Ken Rolston found the game entertaining and fast, but expensive and with limited replayability. "The Lost World game system is an entertaining, superbly produced minor diversion. It earns the highest marks in playability, time and effort to learn, presentation, originality, system quality, and dramatic effect, but its applications are limited and closed-ended, and the cost is perhaps a little steep for a quick thrill. It is certainly worth playing, but less likely to stimulate sustained interest, especially when compared with other similarly priced games."

Larry DiTillio reviewed Lost Worlds for Different Worlds magazine and stated that "What I do guarantee is that Lost Worlds is a definite winner. If you like the thrill of toe-to-toe hack 'n' slash you'll love the game, so bite the bullet on the seemingly high price and get it."

In the April 1996 edition of Arcane (Issue 5), Cliff Ramshaw was not overly impressed with the Flying Buffalo version of Lost Worlds, commenting "Although Lost Worlds is fun, there isn't a great deal of longevity in the format. It's not going to keep you occupied for hours at a time. On the other hand, it represents a great means of resolving certain combat situations in your RPG system of choice." Ramshaw concluded by giving it a below average rating of 6 out of 10.

In the August 1996 edition of Dragon (Issue #232), Rick Swan was excited that Chessex had issued a new version of the game, calling it "as terrific as ever, meeting all the criteria that elevates a product from the merely entertaining to the dazzingly classical." Swan lauded the game as "easy, learnable in a couple of minutes (no kidding) [and]... challenging; 10 years on and I still haven't cracked all its secrets." He concluded, "a Lost Worlds set remains a better buy than a stack of comic books you’ll never read or a weekend’s worth of artery-clogging cheeseburgers that’ll only hasten your journey to an early grave."

In 1999, Pyramid magazine named Lost Worlds as one of the Millennium's Best Games. Editor Scott Haring described the game as a "great, short, take-to-a-con and kill a couple minutes kind of game."

== Awards ==
In 1984, Lost Worlds won the Charles Roberts/Origins Award for Best Fantasy Boardgame of 1983.

== Reviews ==
- Asimov's Science Fiction v8 n2 (1984 02)
- Asimov's Science Fiction v8 n12 (1984 12)
- Isaac Asimov's Science Fiction Magazine

== See also ==
- Ace of Aces (picture book game)
