= Menace (Queen's Blade) =

- Queen's Blade character
- Menace as seen in promotional art for the Queen's Blade anime
- First appearance: Queen's Blade Gamebooks - Ancient Princess Menace (2006)
- Created by: Hobby Japan
- Voiced by: Yūko Gotō (Japanese), Jessica Paquet (English), Akane Tomonaga (Vanquished Queens)

In-universe information
- Nickname: Ancient Princess
- Species: Human, Resurrected Human
- Gender: Female
- Title: Princess of Amara
- Occupation: Bitōshi (Beautiful Fighter), Former Princess
- Family: King of Amara (Deceased Father)
- Nationality: Amaran

Menace (Japanese: メナス, Hepburn: Menasu) is a fictional character from Hobby Japan's Queen's Blade media franchise.

In Queen's Blade, Menace is depicted as the former princess of the Ancient Egyptian-inspired Kingdom of Amara. After being resurrected by the Swamp Witch, she seeks to rebuild her fallen kingdom. She is also a Bitōshi, or Beautiful Fighter, a term used for participants in the Queen's Blade Tournament. Menace is known for her unique design and seductive personality, making her a standout character in the franchise.

In the Queen's Blade anime Menace is voiced by Yūko Gotō and by Jessica Paquet in the English dub.

== Origin ==
Menace first appeared as a character in the Queen's Blade (クイーンズブレイド, Kuīnzu Bureido) series of gamebooks, published by Hobby Japan. Her gamebook, titled Ancient Princess Menace (古代の王女 メナス, Kodai no Ōjo Menasu), was released on September 29, 2006.

She also appeared in the Queen's Blade: Beautiful Fighters Biographies (クイーンズブレイド美闘士列伝, Kuīnzu Bureido: Bitōshi Retsuden) series of visual books. Her visual book in that series was titled Tome of The Ancient Princess (古代の王女の書, Kodai no Ōjo no Sho) and was released on February 15, 2008.

Menace's name is a pun on the Ancient Egyptian ruler Menes, and shares the same katakana as the latter.

Menace is illustrated by veteran artist F.S.

=== Backstory ===
Ancient Princess Menace (古代の王女 メナス, Kodai no Ōjo Menasu) was a princess from the Ancient Egyptian-inspired Amara Kingdom (アマラ王国, Amara-Ōkoku). She once lived a life of luxury until she was betrayed by Anarista, her most trusted adviser, and died trapped in her palace as her kingdom fell into ruin.

Four thousand years later, the powerful Swamp Witch resurrected her to become part of her army. However, Menace broke free from the witch's command and sets out on her own to restore the Amara Kingdom. She has a talking scepter named Setora, who does her bidding.

== Anime appearances ==
=== Queen's Blade: The Exiled Virgin ===
Menace made her anime debut in 2009, appearing as a character in Queen's Blade: The Exiled Virgin, known in Japan as Queen's Blade: Wandering Warrior (クイーンズブレイド 流浪の戦士, Kuīnzu Bureido Rurō no Senshi). She is voiced by Yūko Gotō in Japanese and by Jessica Paquet in the English Dub.

In her first appearance she tries to turn Leina into her servant inside her pyramid. She puts a spell on Leina and uses her to attack Tomoe and Shizuka. After Tomoe breaks the spell on Leina, Menace attacks Tomoe, causing the bridge they are standing on to crumble. Shizuka rescues Tomoe and reveals Menace's past as the princess of a failed kingdom. Enraged, Menace causes the pyramid to self-destruct and declares her intention to resurrect the Kingdom of Amara.

Menace is revealed to have been a princess of the ancient kingdom of Amara. She met her demise after being betrayed by her former adviser, Anarista, but was later resurrected by the villainous Swamp Witch.

Later on, Menace and the other two Swamp Witch minions, Airi and Melona, encounter Nanael in a spring. The three inform Nanael that the Swamp Witch has ordered them to prevent the Queen's Blade Tournament from starting. They engage in a fight with Nanael, but she easily defeats all three of them.

As the Queen's Blade Tournament participants try to enter the city of Gainos to begin the tournament, Menace, Melona, and Airi show up with the Army of the Dead.

Menace, the other Swamp Witch minions, and the Army of the Dead continue their attack against Leina, Risty, Elina, Claudette, and Tomoe. The three Swamp Witch minions fight Leina, but she is rescued by Alleyne and Nowa.

Menace is seen fighting Tomoe once more, just before the other participants join forces to defeat the Swamp Witch's minions and the Army of the Dead. Following this, Queen Aldra announces that all participants may enter the city, marking the official start of the Queen's Blade Tournament.

=== Queen's Blade 2: The Evil Eye ===
She returned for the second season of the anime titled Queen's Blade 2: The Evil Eye, known in Japan as Queen's Blade: Inheritor of the Throne (クイーンズブレイド 玉座を継ぐ者, Kuīnzu Bureido Gyokuza o Tsugu Mono).

Menace, Airi, and Melona enter Gainos after being ordered by the Swamp Witch to join the Queen's Blade Tournament as participants and sabotage it from within.

After entering Gainos, Menace continues her plan to rebuild her old kingdom. Inspired by the words of her living scepter, Setora, she builds a makeshift palace in a tent-like structure. She then casts spells on some local people, turning them into her servants.

While receiving oil massages from her new servants, she is suddenly announced as Claudette's opponent in the Queen's Blade Tournament.

Claudette and Menace engage in a battle in the desert, where Menace initially has the upper hand with her sand and cursed attacks. However, when it starts to rain, Menace's sand attacks weaken, allowing Claudette to emerge victorious. After her defeat, Aldra turns Menace to stone and the spell on Menace's new servants is broken.

While Leina fought Aldra in the Queen's Blade Tournament Final, all of Aldra's victims who had been turned to stone, including Menace, were freed.

=== Queen's Blade: Beautiful Warriors ===
She also appears in the OVA series Queen's Blade: Beautiful Warriors, known in Japan as Queen's Blade: Beautiful Fighters (クイーンズブレイド 美しき闘士たち, Kuīnzu Bureido Utsukushiki Tōshi-tachi).

Some time after the Queen's Blade Tournament, Menace rebuilds the Amara Kingdom with a very small population. Airi and Melona inform her that the Swamp Witch has ordered her to return. Menace refuses, and her scepter Setora claims the debt for her resurrection was paid with the treasures of Amara.

Menace's new luxurious life entices Melona, who decides to stay in the new Amara Kingdom. Airi tries to convince them to obey the Swamp Witch, but a fight ensues, destroying the royal palace. Menace still refuses to return, and Airi and Melona leave without her.

=== Queen's Blade: Vanquished Queens ===
Menace makes a small cameo in Queen's Blade: Vanquished Queens (クイーンズブレイド ヴァンキッシュド・クイーンズ, Kuīnzu Bureido: Vankisshudo Kuīnzu), an OVA series based on the visual books of the same name. She is voiced by Akane Tomonaga.

After Airi and Laila defeat Helosium, a giant humanoid being made of solidified holy milk, by liquefying it, Menace and Nanael are shown among the many women lying around, presumably eaten during Helosium's rampage on the continent. Menace later thanks Airi for saving her.

=== Queen's Blade Unlimited ===
Menace also makes a small cameo in the reboot OVA series Queen's Blade Unlimited (クイーンズブレイド UNLIMITED, Kuīnzu Bureido UNLIMITED).

Menace is seen operating a flying carpet. She offers Airi, Elina, and Michel a ride to the next town. Later on, she is seen alongside Aldra, watching the fight between Elina and Tomoe.

== Characterization ==
=== Physical appearance ===
Menace is depicted as a young adult female with black bob-cut hair, bangs, blue eyes, and a well-toned body. She carries an Ancient Egyptian-inspired motif, adorned with an elegant golden headpiece with a cobra at its center. Menace wears a jeweled breastplate that reaches only midway down her bust, along with blue-and-white striped panties below a translucent cloth at her front. Her arms are wrapped in a flowing white cloth, which are actually bandages she can use for some of her attacks.

=== Personality ===
Menace is depicted as having a domineering personality and a preference for a life of luxury. Her main goal is to revive her lost kingdom of Amara by obtaining followers to do her bidding and recreate the lost kingdom.

Due to being born in Amara, a place located in a sandy desert, Menace is accustomed to wearing less clothing. During the ending credits of her cameo in Vanquished Queens, Menace, Nanael and Airi appear with their clothes torn. While Nanael and Airi try to cover themselves, Menace ignores her torn clothes.

During the ending credits of the second season of Queen's Blade, Menace, Melona, and Airi sing a song called "Buddy Body." During Menace's part, she boasts about her majestic body, highlighting her seductive personality.

Despite her playful and seductive nature, she is quite manipulative and uses her charm to get what she wants. Menace enjoys being pampered, often receiving oil massages from her servants.

=== Abilities ===
As a result of being resurrected by the Swamp Witch, Menace gained magical abilities and became a powerful sorceress. She can cast spells on people and force them to do her bidding by turning them into her servants.

The bandages wrapped around her arms can constrict enemy movement and act as a mid-ranged attack, launching forward and wrapping around an opponent.

Menace is a Bitōshi, or Beautiful Fighter, a term used for participants in the Queen's Blade Tournament. She is also a master of the martial arts passed down by her royal family. Due to her magical abilities, her punch emits a cursed aura that can drain her opponent's life with a single touch.

Menace's attacks include the Cursed Slap, the Royal Family Headbutt, and the Royal Family's Martial Arts. In the Cursed Slap, she delivers a powerful slap infused with a cursed aura, which can drain the life force of her opponent, significantly weakening them. The Royal Family Headbutt involves Menace flying into the air and using her head to deliver a strong, direct blow to her opponent. In the Royal Family's Martial Arts, Setora, her scepter, places the opponent in his mouth. Then, Menace attacks Setora, causing him to spit the opponent into the air.

== In other media ==
=== Video games ===
Menace appears as a playable character in several Queen's Blade video games, these include the PSP game Queen's Blade Spiral Chaos (クイーンズブレイド スパイラルカオス, Kuīnzu Bureido: Supairaru Kaosu) and the mobile and browser games Queen's Blade White Triangle and Queen's Blade Limit Break.

She also appears in the Ikki Tousen mobile game Ikki Tousen: Extra Burst alongside fellow Queen's Blade characters Leina, Elina and Airi.

=== Novels ===
Menace appears in the Light novel Queen's Blade: Return of Amara.

=== Visual books ===
Menace appears in the Queen's Blade Rebellion visual book, Queen's Blade Rebellion: Bitōshi Senki Upheaval Arc (クイーンズブレイド リベリオン 美闘士戦記 激動編, Kuīnzu Bureido Riberion: Bitōshi Senki Gekidō Hen).

== Reception ==
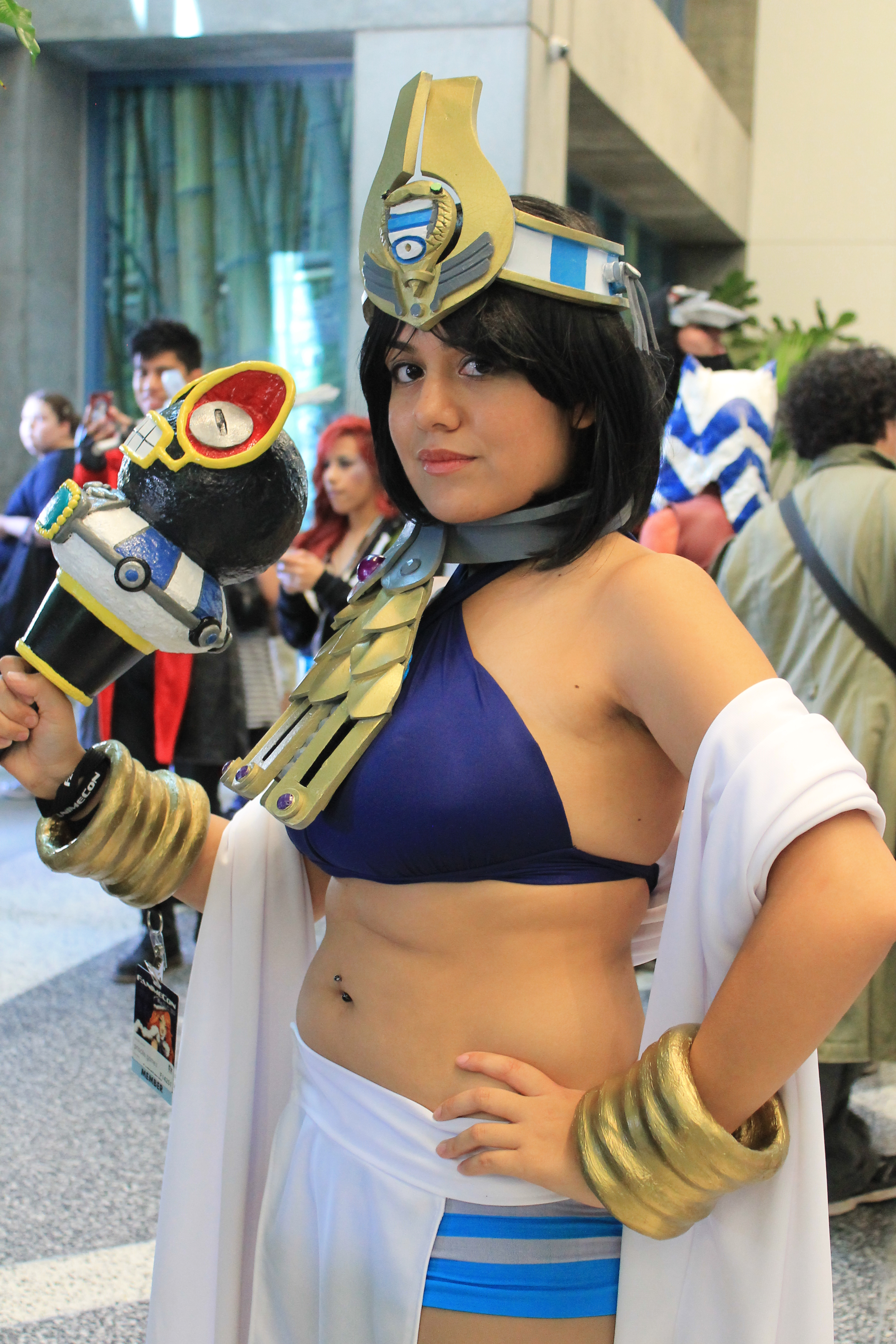
Cosplayer dressed as Menace at FanimeCon 2013

Menace has been well received by fans, with her unique design and seductive charm making her a standout character. Menace is a popular Cosplay character at anime conventions. She was ranked by fans as one of the top two waifus from Queen's Blade alongside Cattleya.

The internet ads for Queen's Blade Limit Break featuring Menace and other characters have garnered mixed reactions. Some viewers found the ads to be eye-catching and provocative, while others considered them overly sexualized and annoying.
