= Queen's Blade Rebellion =

Series of visual combat books

- Cover of the first Queen's Blade Rebellion gamebook released by Hobby Japan featuring Annelotte

クイーンズブレイド リベリオン (Kuīnzu Bureido Riberion)
- Genre: Adventure, fantasy
- Light novel
- Written by: Ukyō Kodachi
- Published by: Hobby Japan
- Imprint: HJ Bunko
- Published: May 30, 2009
- Manga

Queen's Blade Rebellion: Princess Knight of the Blue Storm
- Illustrated by: Iku Nanzaki
- Published by: Kadokawa Shoten
- Magazine: Comp Ace
- Original run: October 26, 2011 – present
- Volumes: 1
- Original video animation
- Directed by: Yōsei Morino
- Written by: Hideki Shirone; Michiko Ito
- Music by: Masaru Yokoyama
- Studio: Arms
- Released: October 29, 2011 – January 28, 2012
- Runtime: 40 minutes
- Episodes: 4 (2 OVAs + 2 Specials)
- Manga

Queen's Blade Rebellion: Zero
- Illustrated by: Riri Sagara
- Published by: Hobby Japan
- Magazine: Comic Dangan
- Original run: December 2, 2011 – present
- Volumes: 2
- Anime television series
- Directed by: Yōsei Morino
- Written by: Hideki Shirane
- Music by: Masaru Yokoyama
- Studio: Arms
- Licensed by: AUS: Siren Visual; NA: Sentai Filmworks
- Original network: AT-X (uncensored); Tokyo MX, Chiba TV, Sun TV, BS11 (censored)
- English network: Anime Network
- Original run: April 3, 2012 – June 19, 2012
- Episodes: 12

Queen's Blade Rebellion (Japanese: クイーンズブレイド リベリオン, Hepburn: Kuīnzu Bureido Riberion) is a series of visual combat books published by Hobby Japan. The sequel to Queen's Blade, it features an all-new cast of characters, as well as reinterpretations of characters from the original series. Like Queen's Blade before it, Rebellion is also compatible with Flying Buffalo's Lost Worlds gamebooks. The first gamebook, featuring Annelotte, was released on November 29, 2008, with a total of twelve gamebooks available in Japan as of December 16, 2011.

An original video animation by Arms was announced, and released two episodes from October 2011 to January 2012. There are currently two manga adaptations based on the Rebellion universe being serialized. The first adaptation, illustrated by Riri Sagara, began serialization in Hobby Japan's online manga magazine Comic Dangan in December 2011, while the second manga adaptation, illustrated by Iku Nanzaki, began serialization in the December 2011 issue of Comp Ace. An anime adaptation by Arms aired on AT-X and other networks between April and June 2012. The anime is licensed in North America by Sentai Filmworks.

== Story ==
Set after the events of Queen's Blade, Gainos and the entire Continent has fallen under a tyrannical rule led by Claudette, the Thundercloud Queen and victor of the last Queen's Blade tournament (Leina renounces the title). Annelotte, a brave young knight and exiled princess, leads a band of rebels called the Rebel Army to overthrow Claudette and restore peace and order to the Continent.

== Characters ==
=== Rebel Army ===
Annelotte Kreutz (叛乱の騎士姫 アンネロッテ・クロイツ, Hanran no Kishi-Hime Annerotte Kuroitsu; Princess-Knight of the Rebellion Annelotte)
Voiced by: Aya Endo (Japanese); Vibe Jones (English)
Annelotte is the charismatic leader of the Rebel Army. Formerly a member of the Knight Corps of Margrave Kreutz (クロイツ辺境伯, Kuroitsu Henkyōhaku) (her father), she was raised as a boy named Alphonse Kreutz (アルフォンス・クロイツ, Arufonsu Kuroitsu). However, tragedy struck when her castle was destroyed by Queen Claudette's forces. While fleeing from Queen Claudette's Assassins in the Elven Forest, she was taken in by Alleyne after being wounded and later became her student, receiving formal swordstraining from her. Seeking revenge for her fallen comrades, she formed the Rebel Army with a group of similarly-fated female warriors in an attempt to otherthrow the Queen.

It is revealed through the Bitōshi Senki visual book and through the gamebook itself that she is half-demon, and when pushed to the edge, she transforms to her demonic form, which consists of her having black hair, pointed ears, pale skin, and red eyes. Her silver armor also turns gold to reflect this change, and in this state is powerful enough to overwhelm Elina, Ymir, and Mirim, but loses all sense of reason and turns into a berserker, unable to distinguish friend from foe. Through her demonic powers, she fights on horseback with the aid of her spectral steed Ambrosius (アンブロウシス, Anburōshisu), and wields Grim Venus (グリム・ヴィナス, Gurimu Vinasu), a broadsword that can be converted to a lance at will. In this state, she calls herself the "Possessed Knight" (狂騎士, Kyō Kishi).

It is hinted through flashbacks of the second Queen's Blade anime adaptation that Annelotte may be Aldra's long lost sister, as a white-haired figure resembling her can be seen walking with the latter. This is further hinted by Annelotte being a half-demon like Aldra. It is finally confirmed in the third volume of the Bitōshi Senki visual book, as they both reunite and remember their past. Her official English name is "Princess Knight Annelotte", and her name is a pun on the demon Astaroth. Created by Eiwa.

Huit (錬金軍師 ユイット, Renkin Gunshi Yuitto; Alchemy Strategist Yuit) and Vante (錬金鋼人 ヴァンテ, Renkin Kōjin Vante; Alchemy Steel Woman Vante)
Voiced by: Minori Chihara (Yuit) and Yukiko Takaguchi (Vante) (Japanese); Zoe Martin (Yuit) and Jessica Paquet (Vante) (English)
Yuit is a young girl from the Little Elves tribe and the tactician of the Rebel Army. She is also Annelotte's childhood friend, and refers to her as "big brother". She is the daughter of Cyan, a legendary alchemist, and is a good friend of the weaponsmith Cattleya. Despite her genius IQ, she acts and behaves like a spoiled child. She controls Vante, an elf-like wind-up automaton, built by Yuit's mother, through a remote control she constantly carries, and acts under the orders written on the rune. Because of this, Vante can easily fall into the wrong hands if the remote is stolen. The two of them together are officially known in English as the "Alchemy Miracle" (錬金の奇跡, Renkin no Kiseki).

Yuit and Vante are illustrated by Spice and Wolf artist Keito Koume.

Tarnyang and Sainyang (対魔師 ターニャン と サイニャン, Taimashi Tānyan to Sainyan; Twin Masters of Magic Tarnyang and Sainyang)
Voiced by: Haruka Tomatsu (Tarnyang) and Kei Shindō (Sainyang) (Japanese); Eva Christensen (Tarnyang) and Jaime Maelor (Sainyang) (English)
Tarnyang and Sainyang are twin sisters from the Manchurian-like country of Shai-Fang (シャイファン, Shaifan), an isolated region of the Continent surrounded by steep and cloudy mountains. They are the descendants of a lineage of exorcists that has been carrying the responsibility of protecting the village for generations, and are bound by an unbreakable cord called the Ryu-Rin-Ren (龍麟連, Ryūrinren) which is wrapped around their necks. They left for a journey in the outside world to bring back the Goshintai (ご神体; lit. "Sacred Body of God"), a mysterious divine protection that has once made Shai-Fang a warm and peaceful land. It is later revealed that this "Goshintai" is actually a human, a girl called the "Child of the Dragon" (龍の子, Ryū no Ko), considered a being with god-like powers in Shai-Fang.

Tarnyang, the older sister, is a holy sword user wielding a jian with a strong-willed, but cheerful, personality. Sainyang, the younger sister and more taciturn of the two (she only whispers to her sister's ear), can use arts with a mysterious power similar to magic, but is often seen spacing out and is very weak, so she's not very useful in battle. Although Tarnyang is always complaining to Sainyang, they are sisters united by a deep bond. With their combined attack "Double Dragon Formation" (双龍陣, Sōryūjin)i. Their official English names are "Twin Taimashi Tarnyang and Sainyang". Created by Tomokazu Nakano.

Mirim (超振動戦乙女 ミリム, Chōshindō Ikusa Otome Mirimu; Hyper Vibration Valkyrie Mirim)
Voiced by: Aki Toyosaki (Japanese); Brittany Lauda (English)
Originally a poor rural girl from the village of Wasilica (ワシリカ, Washirika), Mirim sought to escape poverty by seeking a job at the Queen's Capital. It was there that she was brought in by Ymir as a test subject for her "Strongest Project", and became a member of the Queen's Army under a high-paying salary. She is equipped with the Hyper Vibration Armor and armed with the Hyper Vibration Sword "Infinite Slasher" (インフィニット・スラッシャー, Infinitto Surasshā) – a sword with a chainsaw-like edge, and the Hyper Vibration shield, all of which are powered by the Hyper Vibration Crystal. Despite being given the armor and weapons, she has a weak-willed personality. She eventually leaves the Queen's Army for the Rebel Army after Ymir tries to destroy her home village, in order to punish the villagers for sheltering Annelotte. She calls Annelotte "Big Sister" (お姉様, Onee-sama).

Mirim's name is a play on the Norse mythological figure Mimir. Her Hyper Vibration armor and equipment, which have a Valkyrie motif, is also relevant to her name. Created by Hagane Tsurugi.

Luna Luna (月影の踊り手 ルナルナ, Getsuei no Odorite Runaruna; Moon Shadow Dancer Luna Luna)
Voiced by: Harumi Sakurai (Japanese); Evelyn Lantto (English)
Luna Luna is a member from the Calibara (カリバラ, Karibara) tribe located in the southern jungles. The Calibara tribe were once rivals of the Wild Elves, but now they're mostly extinguished. She is the strongest warrior of her tribe, and is the guardian of its historic ruins where the "Great Power" (大いなる力) is held. It is later revealed that this "Great Power" is the "Sacred Treasure Fortress Bligh" (神機要塞ブライ, Shinki Yōsai Burai), a massive mobile fortress that Yuit's mother Cyan once sought. She sometimes greets her invaders with either a fascinating dance or a death dance. Luna Luna has the bravery of a warrior and the character of an innocent maiden, and her fighting dance is a mixture of both. She fights using four tentacles that extend from her hair, and her skin and eye colors change with her personality and fighting style. When she is in her innocent, fair-skinned form, she is known as the "Sun Dancer" (太陽の踊り手, Taiyō no Odorite). Out of mockery at how Yuit addresses Annelotte, she calls the latter "brother" (おにいさん, Onii-san). Created by F.S.

Sigui (異端審問官 シギィ, Itanshinmonkan Shigyi; Inquisitor Sigui)
Voiced by: Yū Kobayashi (Japanese); Rebecca Kim (English)
A nun and an inquisitor belonging to the Holy Dynasty. A fundamentalist, she is an extremely strict, yet devoted follower of God who is known for executing heretics, usually by burning them alive. Although many call her a cruel person, she is actually a virtuous woman, but she is too serious and inflexible and does not hesitate in judging people.

In the OVA prologue, it is revealed that prior to her title as Inquisitor, she was stationed at the 16th monastery, and was invited by the Holy Dynasty to worship in the Grand Cathedral. During that time, she met Ymir following a skirmish with some drunken women, and has grown acquainted to her despite the latter's merchant-like personality. It is also shown that she tends to rush with her Holy Poses, often rendering them ineffective.

Sigui is very eager to bring down the Rebel Army, who she considers to be a band of heretics, and sees their leader Annelotte, who carries demon blood, as an abomination. She also considers the use of alchemy as a heresy (even the Holy Dynasty has divided opinions on this topic). She is armed with the Holy Flame Mace (聖炎の槌鉾) and God's Chained Blade (神鎖剣), and her fighting skills rivals Annelotte's. Like Melpha in Queen's Blade, she is also a user of the "Divine Power", the manifestation of God's miracles utilized by the provocative "Holy Poses". Later on, she has a crisis of faith, but Annelotte helps her and tells her she doesn't have to fight alone anymore. She ends up joining the Rebel Army, where she calls Annelotte "Elder Sister" (姉上様, Aneue-sama).
Sigui is illustrated by Odanon.

=== Queen's Army ===
Branwen (囚われの竜戦士 ブランウェン, Toware no Ryūsenshi Buranwen; Captured Dragon Warrior Branwen)
Voiced by: Kikuko Inoue (Japanese); DD Montgomery (English)
Branwen is a Dragon Descendant (竜の血を引く者, Ryū no Chi o Hikusha), one of the most noble and rare beings in the Continent, also known as the Holy Dragon Warriors (聖竜の戦士, Seiryū no Senshi) for serving the dragons in the ancient times. Cool, collected and proud but also gentle in nature, she serves as a mediator for both races (though there are hardly any interaction between the dragons and humans), and is well-known among her people. Captured by the trainer (and master) Dogura (調教師 ドグラ; Voiced by: Binbin Takaoka (Japanese); Mike Pollock (English)), she has now become a gladiator slave forced to fight against other slaves and monsters in the Swamp Witch's Arena, ordered to fight in exchange for the life of her Dragon Ride, Asher (アッシャー, Asshā).

Despite being put through numerous death matches, Branwen's pride as a Dragon Descendant will not allow her to die easily. Her power as a Dragon Descendant is immense, and when she cannot suppress her anger any longer, she becomes a malevolent Dragon Warrior, pulverizing every enemy before her.

Branwen is named after the Welsh goddess Branwen. Created by Odanon.

Laila (神罰の執行者 ライラ, Shinbatsu no Shikkōsha Raira; Divine Punishment Enforcer Laila)
Voiced by: Satomi Satō (Japanese); Rebecca Kim (English)
Laila is a half-angel who was taken to the celestial world to become an angel trainee under Nanael's supervision (much to the despair of those around). However, she was not pushed around by Nanael's whims because of her "my pace" nature (doing things in her own pace), and it actually looked like she was the one in control. Despite this, they get along well. Nanael, who went on a rampage, ordered Laila to clean the chaos on the human world with the "Divine Punishment" using Holy Milk. Because she is not a true angel, Laila must wear the sacred tool "Nephilim's Wings" (ネフィリムの羽, Nefirimu no Hane), an artificial wing, to fly, and she is armed with the Heavenly Rifle which fires Holy Milk. At first Laila looks very cool-headed, but she makes so many mistakes that she might actually be very dumb. She has the power to grow in size up to a giant form, that she uses to stop the fortress Bligh when the Rebel Army tries to attack Gainos.

Laila is illustrated by Hirotaka Akaga.

=== Neutral ===
Eilin (宝石姫 エイリン, Hōseki Hime Eirin; Gemstone Princess Eilin)
Voiced by: Suzuko Mimori (Japanese); Veronica Meunch (English)
Eilin is a Dwarf from the Gemstone Mountains, a mountain in the Continent that produces gems. She has a refined and elegant personality, but loves to fight, evidenced through the giant war hammer she carries. Increasing the wealth is the pride of Eilin's clan, and she is famous for her outstanding business acumen and negotiation skills. She is the cousin of Ymir, and although she is very sassy with her, she bears a deep respect for her after losing to Ymir in a fight during childhood. She believes the current Ymir to be an imposter, and after agreeing to support Annelotte in exchange for the Rebel Army's assistance in rescuing her cousin, she goes to the Queen's Castle to confirm her suspicions. There, she meets the true Ymir, who bolts out of the room in anger at being called a fake. Failing to convince her old friend Laila to not fight the Rebel Army, when Ymir comes back Eilin notices that's not her cousin anymore. Created by Hiiro Yuki.

Izumi (戦神の侍 イズミ, Senshin no Samurai Izumi; War God Samurai Izumi)
Voiced by: Minako Kotobuki (Japanese); Jessi Nowack (English)
Izumi is a ronin samurai from Hinomoto who is a user of the self-proclaimed "War God Fencing Style" (戦神流剣術, Senshin-ryū Kenjutsu). In reality, she comes from a town of farmers and taught herself fencing. After her false persona was discovered in Hinomoto, she ran to the Continent where she came across Annelotte, and ended up following her of her own accord. She acts aloof when she talks, but she still follows her earnestly. Even if she were to lose her, she would follow her with her full spirit. She wields a huge nodachi called Saodake (サオダケ) which she carries on her back (she claims on her profile that she picked it up somewhere). She is also able to play a whistle made from seashells that boosts her and her comrades' strength. As a vain person, she won't ever say she's "just a warrior from Hinomoto" to try and correct her lie, and hates losing more than any of her fighter comrades. Created by Yōsai Kūchū.

Captain Liliana (大海賊 キャプテン・リリアナ, Daikaizoku Kyaputen Ririana; Great Pirate Captain Liliana)
Voiced by: Shizuka Itō (Japanese); Marta Vital (English)
Liliana was an infamous pirate who laid waste to the Continent's coastal waters. She is the granddaughter of Pirate Queen Artemis (海賊女王アルテミス, Kaizoku Jo Ō Arutemisu), the writer of the "Pirate Aesthetics" (海賊の美学, Kaizoku no Bigaku), a set of rules which Liliana follows. After she met her untimely death by the sea monster Kraken, she was resurrected by the Swamp Witch to become the leader of her undead army in her plot to take over the Continent. Despite being a scoundrel, she has elegant manners like a noble, which is one of the rules from the Aesthetics. She also has a weakness for elderly people, treating them with great care. She has the ability to summon a flying pirate ship and its phantom crew members through the Swamp Witch's power. However, it becomes a crumbling phantom ship over time, later disappearing. She fights using a rapier and a crossbow. Though she doesn't feel like she owes the Witch anything, she appears listed as a member of the Swamp Army. Created by Haruyuki Morisawa.

Werbellia (沼地の魔女 ウェルベリア, Numachi no Majo Weruberia; Swamp Witch Werbellia)
Voiced by: Junko Minagawa
The being who is followed by the demons and corpses inhabiting the Netherworld and who plans to rule the Continent, she is the Swamp Witch. She suddenly appeared 100 years ago, and the swamp which became her residence gradually expanded by her magic, as she is trying to change the whole Continent into a barren land. She despises the Queen's Blade tournament, as it maintains the present world. With techniques to manipulate departed souls, to summon and to curse, it has reached the extreme that her magical power is perhaps the strongest in the Continent. The true character of the Swamp Witch has the form of a wicked spirit, and her soul and magic are confined in a treasure that has a spider-like form. Unless she parasitizes on an excellent body, her power will be extremely restricted. However, the Swamp Witch has finally obtained the supreme body called Werbellia, and is able to display her complete power. Werbellia is the demonic daughter of the Demon King who lives in the Netherworld, and is Aldra's and Annelotte's mother. She "became" the Swamp Witch around the end of the penultimate Queen's Blade, in an incident that happened several years ago.

The Swamp Witch's behavior is basically decided by vague "fortune-telling". For example, according to a prediction, she cannot kill the beautiful fighters by her own hands; it was predicted that the beautiful fighters would harm themselves, so she weakened the beautiful fighters by casting a curse crueler than killing them. This was known as the "Beautiful Fighters Hunt" (美闘士狩り). Although she's like an incarnation of evil, she is a being adored by most of her subordinates. Apart from her many unintelligible remarks, she is generous and magnanimous, with an evil charisma.

Werbellia makes a brief cameo appearance in the final episode of Queen's Blade: Beautiful Fighters, where she appears (albeit in hooded form) to curse Tomoe during the latter's journey back to Hinomoto. Created by MatsuRyu.

=== Returning characters ===
Claudette (雷雲の女王 クローデット, Raiun no Jo Ō Kurōdetto; Thundercloud Queen Claudette)
Voiced by: Atsuko Tanaka (Japanese); Gladys Weiner (English)
Formerly known as the Lord of Thundercloud (雷雲の将, Raiun no Shō), Claudette is the current ruler of the Continent. She was defeated at the semifinals of the Queen's Blade tournament, but became Queen after Leina, the former champion, refused the throne. She was once respected as an honest, just and upright person, but after she became the Queen, she proclaimed herself as "chosen by the Gods" and abolished the Queen's Blade tournament altogether. She encouraged the research of the "Wizard Stones" (魔導石, Madō Ishi), and civilization progressed very quickly with the effort. She also invalidated the traditional aristocrat system to give a chance of prosperity to all the people regardless of their birth.

By becoming Queen, however, Claudette's strictness has increased, and thus became a ruthless tyrant. Those who break the law are punished without mercy, and any opposition to the Queen are completely obliterated by a powerful military force. Along with a new set of armor, her zweihander, Thunderclap, has also gained a significant upgrade through the power of the Wizard Stones (courtesy of Ymir), and can now manipulate lightning without readying the sword. Although she does not have a gamebook in Rebellion, she has appeared in all other media. Created by Hirokazu Hisayuki.

Elina (牙を統べる者 エリナ, Kiba o Suberusha Erina; Leader of the Fang Elina)
Voiced by: Kaori Mizuhashi (Japanese); Melissa Hope (English)
Claudette's younger half-sister and a former participant in the Queen's Blade tournament. Formerly the Captain of the Vance Guard, Elina is now the leader of the Queen's Assassins of the Fang after the Vance House collapsed. She still has a huge sister complex for her older sister Leina, who has gone missing prior to the series' start. This has resulted in her being mentally unstable and having a sadistic, if not psychotic, personality. Known to be the cruelest of the Assassins of the Fang, she will take down anyone who goes against the Queen. She wears a brand-new set of armor, though she still retains her trademark claw gauntlet and cat-eared headband from her previous outfit. Although she does not have a gamebook in Rebellion, she has appeared in all other media. Created by Hirokazu Hisayuki.

Leina (レイナ, Reina) / Maria (マリア)
Voiced by: Ayako Kawasumi (Japanese); Angora Deb (English)
A mysterious woman known as the Phantom Warrior (幻影の戦士, Gen'ei no Senshi) who aids the Rebel Army. In reality, her true identity is Leina, the Exiled Warrior and the true victor of the last Queen's Blade tournament who had given up her title as Queen to her half-sister Claudette to travel the world. However during her travels, she contracted a mysterious disease that requires her to sleep 16 hours a day. Not only does she need to sleep that long, she also experiences sudden cases of narcolepsy, often requiring her to retreat to her hideout whenever she feels drowsiness. Nonetheless, she is a well-revered warrior who is loved by many. Due to the fighting spirit ingrained in her body, even when she falls asleep due to her curse, she viciously attacks all who approach her carelessly. She has joined and helped Annelotte's party on several occasions, but has a tendency to act alone. Although she does not have a gamebook in Rebellion, she has appeared in all other media. Created by Hirokazu Hisayuki.

Ymir (鋼鉄参謀 ユーミル, Kōtetsu Sanbō Yūmiru; Iron Strategist Ymir)
Voiced by: Ayaka Saito (Japanese); Kate Vincent (English)
Formerly known as the Iron Princess (鋼鉄姫, Kōtetsu Hime), Ymir was a former participant in the Queen's Blade tournament. She had her weapon broken during a fight with Claudette, and by her clan's law is forced to submit to her demands. She became one of Queen Claudette's closest associates and, along with her rich knowledge of alchemy, invented various items to strengthen the Queen's Army. She became much cooler in personality, no longer being afraid of snakes, and rumors from those who knew the often teary-eyed Ymir say she is now another person entirely. She now wields twin battle axes as weapons, and wears a new set of Dwarven armor modeled after the Gothic Lolita style of fashion. Created by Natsuki Mibu.

Aldra (召喚士 アルドラ, Shōkanshi Arudora; Summoner Aldra)
Voiced by: Ayana Taketatsu (Japanese); Kenzie Brooks (English)
The former Queen and victor of the last two Queen's Blade tournaments, where she was known as the Bewitched Queen (逢魔の女王, Oma no Jo Ō). In the last tournament, the dark angel Delmore, the source of her demonic powers, was stripped from her body, and reverted to her true adult form after her defeat. She later embarked on a journey to find her long-lost sister, but suffered from amnesia along the way. During her journey, she fell in love with a man and was later married. Her happy life was short-lived when the war between the Queen's Army and the Rebel Army spread through the whole Continent, and to protect her beloved husband, she was determined to throw herself in the fight, using her innate summoning skills once again. Used to her work as a Gondolier, she was convinced by Ymir to join the Queen's Army when she saw Annelotte (actually Melona, posing as her) acting rude towards a girl from her town.

She summoned and made a contract with the Underworld dwellers Belphe (ベルフェ, Berufe; Voiced by: Mitsuo Iwata (Japanese); Michelle Newman (English)) and Dogor (ドゴール, Dogōru; Voiced by: Masahito Yabe (Japanese); Casey Mongillo (English)) (an amalgamation of the demon Belphegor). However, both demons are secretly plotting to eat Aldra when given the opportunity. Created by Kantaka.

Tomoe (剣聖巫女 トモエ, Kensei Miko Tomoe; Sword Saint Priestess Tomoe)
Voiced by: Mamiko Noto (Japanese); Michele Knotz (English)
A Warrior Priestess from Hinomoto and a former participant of the Queen's Blade tournament. After awakening her ultimate skills in the tournament and returning to Hinomoto, Tomoe was acknowledged as the supreme warrior of Masakado Shrine, and was given the title of Sword Saint Priestess from the High Priest. However, during her travels in the Continent, a curse of blindness was cast on her by the Swamp Witch. Despite her loss of sight, Tomoe did not lose her burning heart and gentle smile. The day her eyes are opened again will probably be the day when the world will submit to Hinamoto's sword skills. When Annelotte travelled to Hinomoto, Tomoe trained her to be calm and observe her foes when she fought, but couldn't join her quest, as Tomoe chose to stay and keep protecting her village. Although she does not have a gamebook in Rebellion, she has appeared in all other media. Created by Eiwa.

Risty (不屈の英雄 リスティ, Fukutsu no Eiyū Risuti; Indomitable Heroine Risty)
Voiced by: Yuko Kaida (Japanese); Jessica Paquet (English)
The benevolent Bandit of the Wilderness and a friendly rival to Leina who, following the tournament, resumed her training. As a result, her muscle strength increased to the point where she discards her mace for hand-to-hand combat. Following Queen Claudette's reign of terror on the Continent, she founded the Rebel Army, funded by the distribution of dark magic stones. However, she was captured by the Queen's Army after the Swamp Witch, during a "Beautiful Fighter Hunt", cast an "indomitable curse" on her that made her unable to eat or sleep. Although she has been weakened after a long stay in prison, her fighting strength still remains. Her "organizational capacity" will fulfill an important role to Annelotte. In the second volume of the Bitōshi Senki visual book, Annelotte comes up with her new nickname, impressed by her resolution. Although she does not have a gamebook in Rebellion, she has appeared in all other media. Created by Eiwa.

Menace (アマラの女王, Amara no Jo Ō Menasu; Queen of Amara Menace)
Voiced by: Yuko Goto
The Ancient Princess of the Amara Kingdom, revived by the power of the Swamp Witch, and one of the participants in the Queen's Blade Tournament. With the help of her eloquent and good partner, the Living Scepter Setora, after the tournament she succeeded in reviving her home, the Amara Kingdom, in a small desert. She became the Queen of the small kingdom. Going at her own pace as usual, she doesn't appear to have changed much since becoming the Queen, but she now seems to think about the ideal way she ought to manage her "country" and her "people". Currently, she loves the citizens of the new Kingdom of Amara (with a population of 98 people) from the bottom of her heart. In the ruins of the Amara desert she found an ancient treasure, the "Controlling Treasure" (支配の秘宝, Shihai no Hihō), that allowed her to manipulate anyone, but she was forced to hand it over to the Swamp Witch. She has no intention of joining Annelotte in their fight, and is only interested in the fortress the Rebel Army acquired. Although she does not have a gamebook in Rebellion, she has appeared in all other media. Created by F.S.

Melona (千変の謀略者メローナ, Senpen no Bōryakusha Merōna; Protean Trickster Melona)
Voiced by: Rie Kugimiya (Japanese); Trina Hilbe (English)
Not much is known about her current role, but Melona seems to have left the Swamp Witch and is now considered part of the Queen's Army. In fact, she poses as Ymir as a spy for the Swamp Witch (implying that she captured the real Ymir in the castle in the Anime), by aiding the Queen in power, making Mirim a guinea pig for the Hyper vibration Suit Experiment, tricking Aldra to help the queen and trying to make Annelotte to lose her good side as a Demon form. All in order to make conflicts between continents and the rebellions, so the Swamp Witch can attack all of them and to rule all over the continents. Created by F.S.

== Media ==
=== Gamebooks ===
- Annelotte – Released November 29, 2008.
- Mirim – Released April 18, 2009.
- Yuit & Vante – Released August 31, 2009.
  - A Yuit figurine was also released with the limited-edition version of the book.
- Tarnyang & Sainyang – Released September 26, 2009.
- Sigui – Released November 28, 2009.
- Luna Luna – Released January 16, 2010.
- Eilin & Ymir – Released April 30, 2010.
- Aldra – Released July 31, 2010.
  - A limited-edition version featuring an Aldra Revoltech figure was also released.
- Liliana – Released February 10, 2011.
- Branwen – Released February 10, 2011.
- Laila – Released July 29, 2011.
- Izumi – Released December 16, 2011.

=== Anime ===
An OVA anime adaptation of Rebellion was bundled with the Queen's Blade Premium Visual Book and Queen's Blade Rebellion Premium Visual Book on DVD. Serving as prologues, the OVAs take place after the events of Queen's Blade: Beautiful Fighters. The OVAs are produced by animation studio Arms, who produced the previous Queen's Blade anime and OVA adaptations, under the directorship of Yousei Morino. Voice actresses Yū Kobayashi and Aya Endo reprised their respective roles as Sigui and Annelotte. The first set of OVAs, entitled "A New Disciple, a New Battle" (新たなる師弟、新たなる闘い) and "Instructor Alleyne's Grueling Boot Camp" (アレイン教官の生しごきブートキャンプ), were released on October 29, 2011. The second set of OVAs, entitled "A Saint's Agony: The Door of Faith Reopens" (聖女の煩悶 〜信仰の扉は、また開く〜) and "Sigui's Passionate Holy Pose Lessons" (シギィの聖なるポーズしっぽりレッスン, Shigyi no Seinaru Pōzu Shippori Ressun), were released on January 28, 2012.

An anime adaption of Rebellion, first announced on October 22, 2011, premiered on April 3, 2012, on AT-X and other networks, and ran twelve episodes until June 19, 2012. The anime was produced by Arms under the directorship of Yousei Morino, the director from the OVA prologues, with script handled by Hideki Shirane, character designs by Rin-Sin, Takayuki Noguchi, and Yukiko Ishibashi, and music composed by Masaru Yokoyama. Six DVD and Blu-ray volumes will later be released by Media Factory, starting from June 25, 2012. Each DVD/BD volume will contain an OVA short entitled "What Will It Look Like If It Smashes Through Restrictions!?" (限界突破で見えちゃうの, Genkai Toppa de Miechau no!?). Simulcasts of the anime are provided by Crunchyroll, starting from April 12, 2012. The anime television series was licensed for distribution in North America by Sentai Filmworks in 2012. The anime is streamed through Crunchyroll and Anime Network. Section23 Films initially announced the North American release for the anime series on Blu-ray and DVD (both including 2 CD soundtracks) for June 9, 2013, however the release was delayed to September 24, 2013. The English language version was produced for Sentai by NYAV Post and Headline Sound.

In March 12, 2026, Queen's Blade Rebellion debuted on the HIDIVE platform, with Comic Book saying that while dubbed and subbed versions would be included, the release would be "limited to the main story and not the prequel and sequel OVAs."

==== Music ====
The opening theme for the series is "I Can Hear the Song of Life" (命のうたが聞こえる, Inochi no Uta ga Kikoeru) by Naomi Tamura, while the ending theme is "future is serious" by Aika Kobayashi. Both songs were released as CD singles on April 25, 2012, by Media Factory.

=== Manga ===
A manga adaptation of Rebellion called Queen's Blade Rebellion: Zero (クイーンズブレイド リベリオン:ZERO, Kuīnzu Bureido Riberion: ZERO), illustrated by Riri Sagara, began weekly serialization in Hobby Japan's online manga magazine Comic Dangan on December 2, 2011. Zero acts as the prequel for the Rebellion storyline, centering on Annelotte's life before Claudette took the throne, and features characters from the original Queen's Blade. The first volume was released on April 2, 2012, with a total of two volumes available in Japan as of October 27, 2012 under Hobby Japan's Dangan Comics imprint.

A second manga adaptation of Rebellion called Queen's Blade Rebellion: Princess Knight of the Blue Storm (クイーンズブレイド リベリオン ～青嵐の姫騎士～, Kuīnzu Bureido Riberion ~Aoarashi no Hime-Kishi~), illustrated by Iku Nanzaki (the author of Queen's Blade: Hide & Seek), began serialization in the December 2011 issue of Kadokawa Shoten's Comp Ace magazine, published on October 26, 2011. The first bound volume was released on March 26, 2012.

=== Other ===
A light novel adaptation of Queen's Blade Rebellion written by Ukyō Kodachi was published by Hobby Japan on May 30, 2009, under its HJ Bunko imprint.

A series of visual books, called Queen's Blade Rebellion: Bitōshi Senki (クイーンズブレイド リベリオン 美闘士戦記, Kuīnzu Bureido Riberion: Bitōshi Senki; lit. Queen's Blade Rebellion: Beautiful Fighter War Chronicle), were published by Hobby Japan. The books are compilations of the illustrated stories posted on Hobby Japan's media site, Hobby Channel, along with additional material. The first visual book, written by Tomohiro Matsu and illustrated by Hagane Tsurugi and Eiwa, was released by Hobby Japan on September 26, 2009. A limited-edition version of the book was also released on the same day, featuring a drama CD. The second visual book, called Queen's Blade Rebellion: Bitōshi Senki Upheaval Arc (クイーンズブレイド リベリオン 美闘士戦記 激動編, Kuīnzu Bureido Riberion: Bitōshi Senki Gekidō Hen), written by Tomohiro Matsu and illustrated by Eiwa, was released by Hobby Japan on October 5, 2010. A third visual book, called Queen's Blade Rebellion: Bitōshi Senki Showdown Arc (クイーンズブレイド リベリオン 美闘士戦記 決戦編, Kuīnzu Bureido Riberion: Bitōshi Senki Kessen Hen), written by Eiji Okita and illustrated by Odanon and Eiwa, was released by Hobby Japan on July 28, 2012.

An artbook called Queen's Blade: Vanquished Queens (クイーンズブレイド ヴァンキッシュド・クイーンズ, Kuīnzu Bureido: Vankisshudo Kuīnzu), with various illustrations by the original artists, was released by Hobby Japan on August 31, 2011. The artbook shows possible defeated scenarios of the fighters from both the Queen's Blade and the Queen's Blade Rebellion saga. A second artbook called Queen's Blade: Vanquished Queens 2 (クイーンズブレイド ヴァンキッシュド・クイーンズ 2, Kuīnzu Bureido: Vankisshudo Kuīnzu 2) was announced by Hobby Japan to be released on November 30, 2012.

A guidebook to the anime series, called Queen's Blade Rebellion Complete (クイーンズブレイド リベリオン コンプリート, Kuīnzu Bureido Riberion Konpurīto), was released by Hobby Japan on August 22, 2012.
