= Matt Shipman =

American voice actor (born 1992)

- Born: August 19, 1992 (age 34); Huntington, New York, U.S.
- Occupation: Voice actor
- Years active: 2015–present
- Notable credits: World War Blue as Gear; Gosick as Kazuya Kujo; Darling in the Franxx as Hiro; Dr. Stone as Chrome; SK8 the Infinity as Reki Kyan; A Journey Through Another World: Raising Kids While Adventuring as Takumi Kayano
- Spouse: Brittany Lauda (m. 2018)
- A vocal sample of Matt Shipman

Matt Shipman (born August 19, 1992) is an American voice actor. He started voice acting professionally in 2015 and was cast in his first lead role with Gear in World War Blue in 2016. Since 2016, some of his larger roles include Kazuya Kujo in Gosick, Hiro in Darling in the Franxx, Chrome in Dr. Stone, Reki Kyan in SK8 the Infinity, Lucian Atwood in Moriarty the Patriot, and Takumi Kayano in A Journey Through Another World: Raising Kids While Adventuring.

== Biography ==
Matt Shipman was born on August 19, 1992. He started voice acting professionally in 2015 with additional voices for Holy Knight. One year later, he was cast in his first lead role, Gear from World War Blue. In 2018, Shipman married voice actress Brittany Lauda. In August 2021, Shipman and Jan Ochoa began co-hosting "Armed and Rangerous", a Mighty Morphin Power Rangers recap podcast produced for Giant Bomb.

Along with Lauda, Shipman co-owns audio production company Kocha Sound.

== Filmography ==
=== Anime ===
Year	Title	Role	Notes	Ref
2015	Holy Knight	Additional voices		
2015	Yu-Gi-Oh! Arc-V	Shay Obsidian		
2016	Juden Chan	Paita	ADR Co-Director	
2016	Rio: Rainbow Gate!	King	ADR Co-Director	
2016	My Wife is the Student Council President	Hayato Izumi		
2016	World War Blue	Gear	ADR Co-Director	
2017	Gosick	Kazuya Kujo		
2017	Gamers!	Masaya		
2017	Classroom of the Elite	Hideo Sotomura		
2017	King's Game The Animation	Teruaki Nagata		
2017	Ai no Kusabi	Norris		
2017	Juni Taisen: Zodiac War	Takeyasu Tsumita/Serpent		
2018	Kakuriyo: Bed and Breakfast for Spirits	Byakuya		
2018	Zoku Touken Ranbu: Hanamaru	Higekiri		
2018	Junji Ito Collection	Hiroshi Sakaguchi		
2018	Legend of the Galactic Heroes	Julian Mintz		
2018	Darling in the Franxx	Hiro		
2018	My Hero Academia	Sen Kaibara, Inasa Yoarashi, Mr. Brave		
2018	Attack on Titan	Floch Forster		
2018	Angels of Death	Additional Voices	Assistant voice director	
2019	Boogiepop and Others	Keiji Takeda, Additional Voices		
2019	Wise Man's Grandchild	Tony Freyd		
2019	Kono Oto Tomare! Sounds of Life	Ōsuke Kiryū		
2019	Nichijou	Katashina		
2019	Dr. Stone	Chrome, Senku Ishigami	Voiced Senku in episode 8 of the third season when Aaron Dismuke was unavailable to record the dub for that episode.	
2019	Arifureta: From Commonplace to World's Strongest	Hajime Nagumo		
2019	Special 7: Special Crime Investigation Unit	Seiji "Rookie" Nanatsuki		
2020	A Certain Scientific Railgun T	Gunha Sogīta		
2020	Run with the Wind	Hirakawa		
2020	Super HxEros	Retto Enjō		
2020	Akudama Drive	Cutthroat	ADR Co-Director	
2021	SK8 the Infinity	Reki Kyan		
2021	Bottom-tier Character Tomozaki	Takei		
2021	That Time I Got Reincarnated as a Slime	Shōgo Taguchi, Razen (Shogo's body)		
2021	Kemono Jihen	Mihai		
2021	Moriarty the Patriot	Lucian Atwood, El		
2021	The World Ends with You: The Animation	Sota		
2021	Kuroko's Basketball	Kotaro Hayama		
2021	2.43: Seiin High School Boys Volleyball Team	Kazuma Hokao		
2021	JoJo's Bizarre Adventure: Stone Ocean	Male prisoners killed by Foo Fighters		
2021	Deep Insanity: The Lost Child	Larry		
2022	Kakegurui Twin	Haruto Kibashira		
2022	Lucifer and the Biscuit Hammer	Hangetsu Shinonome		
2022	Blue Lock	Rin Itoshi		
2022	Mobile Suit Gundam: The Witch from Mercury	Martin Upmont		
2022	Haikyu!!	Junji Kuroishi, Taro Onagawa		
2023	Sugar Apple Fairy Tale	Jonas Anders		
2023	Hell's Paradise: Jigokuraku	Toma		
2023	Heavenly Delusion	Additional voices		
2023	The Ancient Magus' Bride	Isak		
2024	A Journey Through Another World	Takumi Kayano		
2024	Hokkaido Gals Are Super Adorable!	Tsubasa Shiki		
2024	Solo Leveling	Sukmin		
2024	Tsukimichi: Moonlit Fantasy	Izumo Ikusabe		
2024	Vampire Dormitory	Takara		
2025	Blue Exorcist: The Blue Night Saga	Rick Lincoln		
2026	Akane-banashi	Kaisei Arakawa		
2026	Steel Ball Run: JoJo's Bizarre Adventure	L.A. Boomboom, additional voices		

=== Films ===
Year	Title	Role	Notes	Ref
2017	One Piece Film: Gold	Sergeant Straight		
2019	One Piece: Stampede	Cavendish		
2022	Shin Ultraman	Kagami	English dub	

=== Live action ===
Year	Title	Role	Notes	Ref
2023	Ultraman Z	Ultraman Z	English dub	

=== Video games ===
Year	Title	Role	Notes	Ref
2019	YIIK: A Postmodern RPG	Roy Guarder		
2019	ANONYMOUS || AGONY	Haze		
2020	Project Wingman	General Morgan Elizabeth "Wild Boar", Captain Kelleher "Ronin Actual"		
2021	Genshin Impact	Kujou Kamaji		
2022	Made in Abyss: Binary Star Falling into Darkness	Main Character	"Deep in Abyss" mode	
TBA	Muv-Luv: Project Mikhail	Surface Pilot 1, Surface Pilot 4		
TBA	Yandere Simulator	Osana's Stalker		

== Awards ==
Year	Award	Category	Work/Recipient	Result	Ref
2022	Crunchyroll Anime Awards	Best VA Performance (EN)	Reki Kyan (SK8 the Infinity)	Nominated	
