= World War Blue =

Japanese manga and anime series

- Cover of the first manga volume

蒼い世界の中心で (Aoi Sekai no Chūshin de)
- Genre: Fantasy
- Manga
- Written by: Anastasia Shestakova
- Illustrated by: Crimson
- Published by: Red Road
- English publisher: NA: Seven Seas Entertainment
- Imprint: Micro Magazine Comics
- Original run: 2007 – 2012
- Volumes: 9 (doujin edition); 10 (complete edition)
- Anime television series
- Directed by: Tetsuya Yanagisawa
- Produced by: Shigeo Uchiyama; Kōta Takahashi; Kimihito Sekido
- Written by: Crimson; Takao Fusō
- Music by: Tomohiko Kishimoto
- Studio: 5th Avenue
- Licensed by: NA: Media Blasters
- Original network: Tokyo MX, AT-X, TV Saitama
- English network: US: Toku
- Original run: October 20, 2012 – April 4, 2013
- Episodes: 3

World War Blue (Japanese: 蒼い世界の中心で, Hepburn: Aoi Sekai no Chūshin de; lit. In the Center of the Blue World) is a Japanese fantasy manga series written by Anastasia Shestakova and illustrated by Crimson. The series is a re-imagining of the console wars between Sega and Nintendo featuring characters inspired by video games. An anime adaptation by 5th Avenue began airing in Japan on October 20, 2012.

== Plot ==
A parody of the console wars, the series tells the story of two nations, the Segua Kingdom and Ninteldo Empire, locked in a struggle for dominance over the land of Consume. After years of war, the Segua Kingdom is on the defensive until a boy named Gear appears boasting of his incredible speed and powers, but what he does not know is that another person out there is more powerful than he is.

== Characters ==
All of the characters are inspired by characters from various video game franchises.

=== Consume continent ===
==== Segua Kingdom ====
Gear (ギア, Gia)
Voiced by: Nobuhiko Okamoto, Izumi Kitta (young) (Japanese); Matt Shipman, Cheryl Li (young) (English)
A young man from Marcthree Village who possesses incredible speed. When he was young, his father left him to fight in the war; following the death of his friend Til, he too joins the Segua Army in order to get revenge against the Ninteldo Empire. His father is shown to be General Alex, Segua's strongest killer. He is based on the title character from the Sonic the Hedgehog series and named after the Game Gear console.
Nel (ネル, Neru)
Voiced by: Suzuko Mimori (Japanese); Cait Page (English)
A young girl with pointy ears who is Gear's childhood friend. After her parents were killed in the Marcthree massacre, she was taken in by Gear and Til. She thinks of Gear as her older brother. Nel is based on Nei from Phantasy Star II.
Til (ティル, Tiru)
Voiced by: Kōki Uchiyama (Japanese); Clifford Chapin (English)
Gear's best friend who was killed by Ninteldo soldiers, prompting Gear to get revenge. He is based on Tails from the Sonic the Hedgehog series.
Opal (オパール, Opāru)
Voiced by: Izumi Kitta (Japanese); Brittany Lauda (English)
An archer who is the second strongest in the Segua Special Forces. She prides herself on never missing with her arrows. She starts to fall in love with Gear after he shows her his true nature and strength. Opal is based on Opa-Opa from the Fantasy Zone series.
Ramses (ラムセス, Ramusesu)
Voiced by: Yukiko Monden (Japanese); Theresa Buchheister (English)
The lieutenant general of the Segua Army. She is based on the Columns game.
Alex (アレックス, Arekkusu)
Voiced by: Rikiya Koyama (Japanese); Michael Liscio, Jr. (English)
Gear's father, and general of the Segua Army who is considered the strongest killer. He is based on the title character from the Alex Kidd series.
Stella (ステラ, Sutera)
Voiced by: Kyoko Higami (Japanese); Erica Schroeder (English)
Gear's mother, and General Alex's wife.
Satanna Itsuna Segua (サターナ・イツナ・セグア)
The 5th queen of Segua Kingdom.
Sakira (サキラ)
Satanna's royal guard captain.
Gadra? (ガドラ)
The former king of Segua Kingdom, and Satanna's father.

==== Ninteldo Empire ====
Marcus (マルクス, Marukusu)
Voiced by: Atsushi Ono (Japanese); Mike Pollock (English)
The moustached general and emperor of the Ninteldo Empire, who helped it gain control of 90% of Consume. Marcus is based on the title character from the Mario series. He is occasionally seen riding a green dinosaur named Yozu, which is based on Yoshi.
Zelig (ゼリグ, Zerigu)
Voiced by: Takehito Koyasu (Japanese); Chris Niosi (English)
One of the top soldiers of the Ninteldo Empire. He is based on Link from The Legend of Zelda series.
Guliji (グリージ, Guriji)
Voiced by: Sho Karino (Japanese); Mike Pollock (English)
Marcus' younger brother, the prince of the Ninteldo Empire and a commander in the Ninteldo Army. Guliji is based on Luigi from the Mario series.
Fae (ファーエ, Fāe)/Miss Reset (ミス・リセット, Misu・Resetto)
Voiced by: Yuri Hirata (Japanese); Amanda Lee (English)
She is based on the Fire Emblem series.
Masa (マーサ, Māsa)
He is based on the Mother series.
Karvai (カーヴァイ, Kavai)
Voiced by: Nami Miyanaga (Japanese); Kira Buckland (English)
She is based on the title character from the Kirby series.
Saroid (サーロイド, Sāroido)
She is based on Samus Aran from the Metroid series.
Foster (フォスタ, Fosuta)
He is based on Fox McCloud from the Star Fox series.
Doll Digorg? (ドル・ディゴルグ)
The original Ninteldo general who possesses extraordinary strength. He is based on the title character from the Donkey Kong series.
Digorg? Jr. (ディゴルグ・ジュニア)

===== Kusamura =====
It is a region south of Ninteldo, where a family of 151 siblings lives.

Pirika (ピリカ, Pirika)
She is based on Pikachu from the Pokémon series.
You (ユゥ, Yuu)
Lead daughter of the 151 siblings.

==== Illegal pirates ====
Fake Digorg? (偽ディゴルグ)
Fake Digorg? Jr. (偽ディゴルグ・ジュニア)
Fake Dash (偽ダッシュ)

==== Slovia ====
Crystal (クリスタル = エフェレフ)
Voiced by: Kyoko Narumi (Japanese); Michaela Laws (English)
The supreme queen of the Slovia Kingdom. She is based on the crystals from the Final Fantasy series.
Garland (カーランド = エフェレフ)

==== Babido Republic ====
Kichou Kazuo (キチョウ = カズオ)
Bakudou Shiroko (バクドウ = シロコ)

==== Decolian ====
Asimov East (アシモフ・イースト)
Akagi East (アカギ・イースト)
Hercule (ハーキュリー)
Blocks (ブロックス)

==== Tatoland/Tatrand ====
Bays (ヴァイズ・ブル, Baizu Buru)
Voiced by: Kouta Ōshita (Japanese); Jake Paque (English)
A strong warrior of Tatrand. He is based on Bub and Bob from the Bubble Bobble series.
E-vazer? (イ・ベイザー)
The legendary invader that had invaded Consume continent.

==== Puzzle magical academy/Puzzle Academy ====
It is a school located at southwest end of the Consume continent.

=== Other continent ===
It is a continent north of Consume continent.

==== Rug Federation ====
It is a land with extremely cold weather. The currency is ruble.

Tejirov (テジロフ, Tejirof)
Voiced by: Hiro Shimono (Japanese); Y. Chang (English)
A mercenary from the island of Lorgue who was once Ramses' upperclassman at the Puzzle Academy. He is able to produce magical barriers and has a tendency to make various dirty jokes. He is based on the Tetris game.

== Media ==
=== Manga ===
The original manga by Anastasia Shestakova and illustrated by Crimson began release on Red Road's mobile service from 2007. Nine tankōbon volumes have been released as of 2012. Seven Seas Entertainment has licensed the series for release in North America. The first volume was released in Summer of 2013.

Complete version was published by Micro Magazine.

Volume list (doujin edition)

No.	Title	Original release date	English release date
1	World War Blue Vol. 1 (Console Wars: Prepare to do Battle!); Onsoku no Dobunezumi (音速のドブネズミ)	July 30, 2007; 978-4-90427707-2	2013-07-02; 978-1-937867-96-6
2	World War Blue Vol. 2 (First Quest: Test Your Might!); Zetto Zōn (Zゾーン)	October 4, 2007; 978-4-90427708-9	2013-08-06; 978-1-937867-97-3
3	World War Blue Vol. 3 (A Trap is Sprung: Escape or Die!); Gurīso Hiru (グリーソヒル)	December 30, 2007; 978-4-90427709-6	2013-11-05; 978-1-626920-05-7
4	World War Blue Vol. 4 (); Shainingu ando Dakunesu (シャィ二ング&ダクネス)	July 10, 2008; 978-4-90427710-2	2014-02-18; 978-1-626920-05-7
5	World War Blue Vol. 5 (Change of Allegiance: Shifting Sides); Kami no Ochimono (神の落ちモノ)	December 25, 2008; 978-4-90427711-9	2014-04-15; 978-1-626920-13-2
6	World War Blue Vol. 6 (GAMES WITHIN GAMES): (-)	March 23, 2009; 978-4-90427712-6	2014-07-15; 978-1-626920-59-0
7	World War Blue Vol. 7 (Crossroads: Choose Your Path!): (-)	March 23, 2009; 978-4-90427713-3	2014-09-23; 978-1-626920-66-8
8	World War Blue Vol. 8 (UNEXPECTED ALLIANCES): (-)	June 30, 2009; 978-4-90427714-0	2015-05-26; 978-1-626920-97-2
9	(-)	December 12, 2009; 978-4-90427722-5	-

Volume list (complete edition)

No.	Title	Japanese release date	Japanese ISBN
1	-: (蒼い世界の中心で 完全版 1)	2010-05-28	978-4-89637338-7
2	-: (蒼い世界の中心で 完全版 2)	2010-05-28	978-4-89637339-4
3	-: (蒼い世界の中心で 完全版 3)	2010-08-30	978-4-89637343-1
4	-: (蒼い世界の中心で 完全版 4)	2010-03-03	978-4-89637359-2
5	-: (蒼い世界の中心で 完全版 5)	2010-03-03	978-4-89637360-8
6	-: (蒼い世界の中心で 完全版 6)	2011-06-26	978-4-89637366-0
7	-: (蒼い世界の中心で 完全版 7)	2011-11-27	978-4-89637377-6
8	-: (蒼い世界の中心で 完全版 8)	2012-03-25	978-4-89637386-8
9	-: (蒼い世界の中心で 完全版 9)	2012-03-30	978-4-89637417-9
10	-: (蒼い世界の中心で 完全版 10)	2012-04-30	978-4-89637421-6

=== Anime ===
An anime adaptation was produced by 5th Avenue. The first episode was aired on Tokyo MX from October 20, 2012 and was also simulcast by Crunchyroll. Episode 2 aired on December 27, 2012, and episode 3 aired on April 4, 2013. On September 11, 2016, Media Blasters announced that they would dub and distribute the series. On January 11, 2017, Toku announced that it will premiere the World War Blue anime series in February. Later that month, was announced to begin on February 6.

The opening theme is "Retrospective World" by Hiro Shimono and Nobuhiko Okamoto whilst the ending theme is "0 and 1's Flowers" (0と1の花, Zero to Ichi no Hana) by Izumi Kitta and Suzuko Mimori.

=== Episode list ===
No.	Title	Original release date	English release date
1	"The Hard Wars of Consume" "Konshūmu Tairiku Hādo Sensō" (コンシューム大陸厳しい戦争)	October 20, 2012	February 6, 2017
In the continent of Consume, two nations, the Segua Kingdom and the Ninteldo Empire, are at war with each other, with Ninteldo ruling over 90% of the continent due to the strength of their leader, General Marcus. In the Segua Kingdom, a boy named Gear travels with his childhood friend, Nel, to the capital, seeking to join the Segua Army in order to avenge the death of his best friend Til at the hands of Ninteldo. Segua's vice-general, Ramses, tests Gear by pitting him against 50 of her soldiers, which he defeats instantly with his amazing speed. Impressed by his strength, Ramses enlists Gear in the special forces, alongside an archer named Opal, and tasks them with the mission of rescuing their strongest warrior, General Alex, who is being held prisoner in the Ninteldo-allied country of Tatrand. Later that night, Gear is called out by Opal, who doesn't approve of him and challenges him to a fight for his right to stay in the army. Gear wins instantly with a direct attack, earning her praise after he explains how he admires those who aim to go forward. The next morning, Ramses introduces the third special forces member, a somewhat perverted mercenary named Tejirov, who decides to train Gear for the operation, his barriers winning against Gear's speed.
2	"Killer" "Kirā" (キラー)	January 3, 2013	February 13, 2017
Tejirov trains Gear, Opal and Nel to use their "Killer" abilities, special skills possessed by only a small fraction of people in Consume. Ramses and Tejirov discuss the possibility that Gear is the son of General Alex. Gear asks Tejirov about other Killers especially the strongest ones. The group start their mission to rescue General Alex from Hope Fortress. While on their way, they find a wounded Segua scout who asks to be "absorbed". Tejirof and Opal explain that Killers can absorb the life forces of others, gaining their strength, but that there are limits to how many one can absorb (Gear can absorb two). They are interrupted by the appearance of the Vaiz, one of Tatrand's Killers. Tejirov cages him in a wall of light so they can escape. Once inside the fortress, Opal plays decoy so the others can get past D. Fisher, another Tatrand Killer. Tejirov, Gear and Nel reach General Alex's cell, where Gear finds out that he is his father.
3	"Lost Star & KID" "Rosutosutā to kiddo" (ロストスター&KID)	April 4, 2013	February 20, 2017
General Alex is too wounded to be saved. Tejirov tells Gear that he must instead absorb Alex. He refuses at first, but Alex says he has no choice and forces Gear to touch him. Before he is absorbed, he tells Gear the story of his mother, the only killer Alex considered to be his equal, whom he had to absorb after they were so badly wounded in combat that they could only survive if one of them absorbed the other. Opal is left unable to move after her battle with D. Fisher and is nearly killed by Vaiz's brother Voiz, but it rescued by a newly energized Gear, who joins the siege on the fortress. Tejirov leaves to prevent Bays from interfering with Gear, leaving Opal in Nel's care, but Vaiz surrenders, remarking that the battle is already lost. In the end, Segua takes Hope Fortress, and Gear is given the nickname of "Blue Sonic", becoming infamous throughout both the Ninteldo empires and their allied countries.
