= Brittany Lauda =

American voice actress

- Born: February 18
- Other name: Bree Faith
- Education: State University of New York at Geneseo
- Occupations: Voice actress; ADR director; producer
- Years active: 2013–present
- Spouse: Matt Shipman (m. 2018)
- A sample of Brittany Lauda's voice
- Website: www.brittanylauda.com

Brittany Lauda (born February 18) is an American voice actress and voice director who has appeared in English-language dubs of Japanese anime and video games. Her debut role was in Queen's Blade Rebellion, where she (Note: Lauda differentiates between any personal pronoun. This article uses feminine pronouns for consistency.) voiced Mirim.

== Biography ==
Lauda has been involved in many productions for Media Blasters. Some of her major roles are Ichigo in Darling in the Franxx, Yuzuriha Ogawa in Dr. Stone, Plug Cryostat in Fight Ippatsu! Jūden-chan!!, Audrey Belrose in HuniePop, Cammot in Holy Knight, Riko in Made in Abyss, Osana Najimi in Yandere Simulator, and Ui Wakana the title character in My Wife is the Student Council President. She and fellow voice director Melanie Ehrlich had a production company called MB VoiceWorks which worked on the dub for Holy Knight and casting for Ladies versus Butlers. She graduated from Harborfields High School in Greenlawn, New York, and the State University of New York at Geneseo with a Bachelor of Arts degree in history. She has also been an active cosplayer at anime and science fiction conventions under the name Bree Faith.

== Personal life ==
Lauda married Matt Shipman on July 7, 2018. On June 6, 2020, she made a post on Twitter stating she is pansexual.

Lauda is gender-nonconforming, genderqueer and goes by any pronouns.

== Filmography ==
=== Anime ===
List of dubbing performances in anime
Year	Title	Role	Crew role, notes	Source
2013	Queen's Blade Rebellion	Mirim	Debut role	
2015	Holy Knight	Cammot	Dub producer; ADR director	
2015	Ladies versus Butlers	Kaoru Daichi	ADR director	
2015	Pokémon: XY	Katherine, Charlene, Lily		Resume
2016	Fight Ippatsu! Juden-chan!!	Plug Cryostat	ADR director	
2016	Gosick	Luigi		Resume
2016	Castle Town Dandelion	Anzu Shirogane		
2017	Seven Mortal Sins	Leviathan		
2017	Alice and Zoroku	Yonaga Hinagiri		
2017	World War Blue	Opal		
2017	Rio: Rainbow Gate	Rina Tachibana	ADR Director	
2017	Regalia: The Three Sacred Stars	Sara Kleis		
2017	My First Girlfriend is a Gal	Nene Fujinoki		
2017	Hina Logi ~from Luck & Logic~	Liones Yelistratova		
2017	Ai no Kusabi		ADR director; ADR engineer	
2017	King's Game	Mizuki Yukimura		
2017	New Game		ADR co-director	
2017–2019	The Morose Mononokean	Yahiko		
2018	Death March to the Parallel World Rhapsody	Liza		
2018	Legend of the Galactic Heroes: Die Neue These	Hildegard von Mariendorf	ADR co-director	
2018	Citrus	Manami		
2018	Basilisk: The Ouka Ninja Scrolls	Hachisu		
2018	Goblin Slayer	Cow Girl		
2018	Darling in the Franxx	Code:015 / Ichigo		
2018	A Certain Magical Index	Lessar		
2018–2022	Made in Abyss	Riko		
2019	Hakumei and Mikochi	Sasanami		
2019	Nichijou	Mai Minakami		
2019	My Wife is the Student Council President	Ui Wakana		
2019	Azur Lane	Hammann, Tester		
2019	Fairy Tail	August (child)		
2019–present	That Time I Got Reincarnated as a Slime	Kenya Misaki, Queen of Blumund		
2020	Interspecies Reviewers	Meidri		
2020	Super HxEros	Kirara Hoshino		
2020	Higurashi: When They Cry - GOU	Satoko Hojo		
2020	Warlords of Sigrdrifa	Azuzu Komagome		
2020	Akudama Drive	Doctor	ADR director	
2021	D4DJ First Mix	Towa Hanamaki		
2021	Kuma Kuma Kuma Bear	Flora		
2021	Kemono Jihen	Kon	ADR director, assistant ADR engineer	
2021	One Piece	Koala's mother (ep 542), Trafagar D. Law (young)		
2021	Pokémon Evolutions	Young N, Anthea, Heroine (Kanto)		
2021–2022	JoJo's Bizarre Adventure	Foo Fighters/F.F.		
2022	Kakegurui	Miri Yobami	Sentai Filmworks dub	
2022	Tokyo 24th Ward	Kozue Shirakaba		
2022	Fire in His Fingertips	Midori		
2022	Fate/Grand Carnival	Osakabehime, Elizabeth Báthory		
2022	Girlfriend, Girlfriend	Saki Saki		
2022	Kakegurui Twin	Emcee		
2023	Heavenly Delusion	Tokio		
2023	Farming Life in Another World	Rosalind		
2023	Digimon Adventure	Spadamon, Vademon, Pomumon, Nanomon, Lalamon, Divermon, Soulmon, Elecmon		
2023	My Unique Skill Makes Me OP Even at Level 1	Erza		
2024	Hokkaido Gals Are Super Adorable!	Sayuri Akino		
2024	REBORN!	Tsunayoshi "Tsuna" Sawada	ADR Director	
2024	The Grimm Variations	Rose		
2024	Chained Soldier	Coco, Yuuki Wakura (young)		
2024	Oshi no Ko	Minami Kotobuki		
2024	Shangri-La Frontier	Female Narrator		
2024	Re:ZERO -Starting Life in a New World-	Capella Emerada Lugunica		
2024	Dandadan	Chiquitita		
2025	Dragon Ball Daima	Chi Chi (Mini)		
2025	Sanda	Niko Kazao		
2026	Cyberpunk: Edgerunners 2	Capri		
2026	Hands Off: Sawaranaide Kotesashi-kun	Aroma Kusunoki		

=== Video games ===
List of voice performances in video games
Year	Title	Role	Notes	Source
2015	HuniePop	Audrey Belrose		Resume
2015	Strife	Blazer		Resume
2015–2023	Yandere Simulator	Osana Najimi (Rival-chan)		
2016	HunieCam Studio	Audrey Belrose, Brooke Belrose		Resume
2017	Battlerite	Pearl		Resume
2019	YIIK: A Postmodern RPG	Soul Space Spectre, Child Vella		
2020	MapleStory	Veronica, Boo		Resume
2021	Mobile Suit Gundam: Battle Operation 2	Katarina Wenders	Game released in 2018. English dub added on January 28, 2021 patch	In-game credits
2021	Ys IX: Monstrum Nox	Xavier, Iris		
2021	Disgaea 6: Defiance of Destiny	Mee-ow Thief		
2021	Project Mikhail	Chizuru Sakaki, Isfana Nepherte		
2022	Tiny Tina's Wonderlands	Alma		In-game credits
2022	Made in Abyss: Binary Star Falling into Darkness	Riko		
2022	Goddess of Victory: Nikke	Guilty, Sin		
2023	The Legend of Nayuta: Boundless Trails	Caelum, Colone, Bell, Nemeas		
2023	Anonymous;Code	Felino Arcana		
2023	Rhapsody II: Ballad of the Little Princess	Nyankos and Nyancies		
2023	Rhapsody III: Memories of Marl Kingdom	Nyankos and Pokonyans		
2023	Disgaea 7: Vows of the Virtueless	Spice		
2023	Genshin Impact	Chiori		
2024	Ys X: Nordics	Ashley, Iluna		
2024	Card-en-Ciel	Sera Sireness, Mountain Spirit, Shinobu Kamizono		
2025	Fire Emblem Shadows	Kurt		
2025	Digimon Story: Time Stranger	Venusmon		
2026	Neverness to Everness	Nanally		
2026	School Days Remastered	Sekai Saionji		
