= Kemono Jihen =

Japanese manga and anime series

- First tankōbon volume cover, featuring Kabane Kusaka

怪物事変
- Genre: Dark fantasy; Mystery; Supernatural
- Manga
- Written by: Sho Aimoto
- Published by: Shueisha
- English publisher: NA: Seven Seas Entertainment
- Imprint: Jump Comics SQ.
- Magazine: Jump Square
- Original run: December 2, 2016 – present
- Volumes: 25
- Anime television series
- Directed by: Masaya Fujimori
- Written by: Noboru Kimura
- Music by: Yuya Mori
- Studio: Ajiado
- Licensed by: Crunchyroll: SA/SEA: Muse Communication
- Original network: Tokyo MX, ytv, BS11
- Original run: January 10, 2021 – March 28, 2021
- Episodes: 12
- icon

Kemono Jihen (怪物事変; lit. 'Monster Incidents') is a Japanese manga series written and illustrated by Sho Aimoto. It has been serialized in Shueisha's shōnen manga magazine Jump Square since December 2016, with its chapters collected in 25 tankōbon volumes as of August 2026. An anime television series adaptation produced by Ajiado aired from January to March 2021.

== Plot ==
In a remote mountain village, a series of mysterious incidents involving livestock corpses draws the attention of Kohachi Inugami, a detective from Tokyo who specializes in supernatural cases. While investigating, he meets a boy named Kabane, who is forced to work in the fields and is ostracized by the villagers, who treat him as if he is not human.

During the investigation, Inugami discovers that Kabane is actually a half-ghoul, abandoned by his parents and left to live in misery with relatives who treat him as a burden. After solving the case and exposing the supernatural cause behind the animal killings, Inugami takes Kabane back to Tokyo, where he runs a detective agency that handles cases involving creatures that exist alongside humans in secret.

In Tokyo, Kabane begins working at the agency alongside other boys who are like him, including Shiki, who has spider-like abilities, and Akira, who has powers related to snow and ice. As Kabane adjusts to his new life and forms bonds with his new companions, he also searches for clues about his missing parents.

== Characters ==
Kabane Kusaka (日下 夏羽, Kusaka Kabane)
Voiced by: Natsumi Fujiwara (Japanese); Madeleine Morris (English)
A 13-year-old ghoul-human hanyo or hybrid. After being supposedly abandoned by his parents, he was abused by his aunt as hard labor for her inn, earning him the nickname "Dorotabo" as he was always covered in dirt and smelling badly from toiling in the fields. Kabane later learns from Inugami that he was likely not abandoned due to being in possession of the Life Calculus, which quenches his ghoulish thirst for flesh, and begins searching for his parents while learning more about his emotions along the way. Kabane possesses an innocent and straightforward personality, as well as an extremely self-sacrificial spirit. Owing to his immortality as a bloodless ghoul and ability to regenerate provided his head remains intact, he often puts himself in the line of fire for his friends. Apart from regeneration, his ghoul blood also gifts him incredible strength. Believing his parents' bodies to have been the vessels for the Calculi, he begins collecting all the other Calculi and combining them.
Kohachi Inugami (隠神 鼓八千, Inugami Kohachi)
Voiced by: Junichi Suwabe (Japanese); Patrick Seitz (English)
A tanuki known as "the Kemonoist" that runs the Inugami Strangeness Consultancy Office. While he appears carefree and frivolous at times, he is frighteningly perceptive and is a powerful Kemono, being able to use strong illusion spells, summon guns and harden his body to steel. Inugami strongly believes in coexistence between Kemono and humans. He currently takes care of Kabane, Shiki and Akira, and houses Mihai.
Akira (晶)
Voiced by: Ayumu Murase (Japanese); Cassie Ewulu (English)
A 15-year-old yukionoko from Aomori. As a descendant of yukionna, he has the ability to freeze objects provided there is water around, manipulate snow and ice, and withstand very cold temperatures. He came to Tokyo hoping Inugami could help him find his older twin brother, Yui, whom he escaped their village with. Despite being a boy, Akira is extremely feminine and enjoys girlish, cute things and posting on social media. Because of his hate for disgusting things and tendency to faint from fear, he mainly takes care of domestic affairs in the office. Even so, Akira is often able to pull his weight for the others in a pinch, later unlocking a hidden power of the yukionokos.
Shiki Tademaru (蓼丸 織, Tademaru Shiki)
Voiced by: Natsuki Hanae (Japanese); A. J. Beckles (English)
A 14-year-old Arachne-human hanyo who had been passed into Inugami's custody by his uncle. He is a tsundere, often brash and rude with his friends but making sure to take good care of them at the same time. Out of all the three children, he is the most rational and level-headed. Shiki fights by producing thread from his sweat and spit, and manipulating their qualities to become stickier or harder, though this dehydrates him after some time. With Inugami and Kabane's help, Shiki manages to reunite with his mother and younger sister Aya.
Mihai (ミハイ)
Voiced by: Daisuke Ono (Japanese); Matt Shipman (English)
An immortal vampire that lives as a shut-in in Inugami's house, living out his countless days by playing video games. Owing to his many years of life, he is in a constant state of boredom and has mastered almost every skill there is, including cooking and sewing. He mainly specialises in communication technology and hacking, and so manages the agency's online affairs. While narcissistic and arrogant, he helps the agency out with his best efforts.
Yoko Inari (飯生 妖子, Inari Yōko)
Voiced by: Kana Hanazawa (Japanese); Kristen McGuire (English)
A female kitsune. Under the public eye, she is the superintendent of the Shinjuku police force, but that position is mainly used as her foothold in human society. Although she used to work with Inugami on managing human and Kemono-related issues, she admits that while Inugami seeks for coexistence, she seeks to control humans and preside as the queen over the country someday. She breaks off her relations with Inugami upon realising the existence of the Calculi, and begin plotting ways to steal them from Kemono tribes all over Japan. Inari is manipulative, selfish, vain and extremely hot-tempered to the point of being ruthless. She later assembles a private force of fellow kitsune to steal the Calculi, intending to combine them into one for herself.
Kon (紺)
Voiced by: Yumiri Hanamori (Japanese); Brittany Lauda (English)
A young kitsune girl who is also Inari's loyal follower, viewing the latter as a mother-figure. Unlike most kitsune, she is unable to hide her ears through illusion spells, and does so under her hood instead. Stemming from a need to be the most important and a "good girl", she serves Inari with complete admiration, unaware that she is simply being used. Kon fights by discharging fire from her tail and striking with her claws. She later comes to like Kabane and leaves Inari's side. She later regains memories blocked and muddied by Inari, about how Inari killed and devoured her entire clan, keeping only her alive with her memories altered to wait until she would grown stronger.
Nobimaru (野火丸)
Voiced by: Hiro Shimono (Japanese); Kevin K. Gomez (English)
A kitsune boy who replaces Kon after she fails her mission. He appears to be extremely loyal under Inari, but secretly despises her, often secretly taking actions without her orders. He hides his ears under a pair of headphones. Despite taking on the appearance of a 13-year-old, he is actually 19 years old. Nobimaru has a crafty and intelligent personality able to rival Inugami's, and is extremely capable with both fire and illusion spells. He becomes the head of Inari's private kitsune force later on.
Yui (結)
Voiced by: Kaito Ishikawa (Japanese); Ben Balmaceda (English)
Kumi (組)
Voiced by: Aya Hisakawa (Japanese); Heather Gonzalez (English)
Akio Tademaru (蓼丸 昭夫, Tademaru Akio)
Voiced by: Akira Ishida (Japanese); Cody Savoie (English)

== Media ==
=== Manga ===
Written and illustrated by Sho Aimoto, Kemono Jihen has been serialized in Shueisha's shōnen manga magazine Jump Square since December 2, 2016. Shueisha has collected its chapters into individual tankōbon volumes. The first volume was released on March 3, 2017. As of August 4, 2026, twenty-five volumes have been released. The series is set to end with the release of its twenty-sixth volume.

The manga is licensed for an English release in North America by Seven Seas Entertainment.

==== Volumes ====
No.	Original release date	Original ISBN	English release date	English ISBN
1	March 3, 2017	978-4-08-881096-6	August 9, 2022	978-1-63858-539-8
1. "The Dorotabo of the Deer Village" (鹿の子村の泥田坊, Kanoko-mura no Dorotabō); 2. "Bugs" (蟲, Mushi); 3. "The Kemono Office" (怪物屋, Kemono-ya); Extra. "A Day When Nothing Happens" (なんにもない日, Nan'nimo Nai Hi)
2	July 4, 2017	978-4-08-881128-4	October 11, 2022	978-1-63858-540-4
4. "Vixen" (女狐, Okitsune); 5. "The Cat from Shinjuku Ni-Chome" (新宿二丁目の猫, Shinjuku Nichōme no Neko); 6. "The Mystery of the Shibuya River Sewers" (渋谷川暗渠の怪, Shibuya-gawa Ankyo no Kai); 7. "He Who Lives in Darkness" (闇に棲むもの, Yami ni Sumu Mono)
3	November 2, 2017	978-4-08-881169-7	December 13, 2022	978-1-63858-541-1
8. "A Jungle" (黒い工場, Kuroi Kōjō); 9. "That Which Runneth Over" (湧き出るもの, Wakideru Mono); 10. "Existence" (生存, Seizon); 11. "Spider's Thread" (蜘蛛の糸, Kumo no Ito)
4	March 2, 2018	978-4-08-881368-4	February 21, 2023	978-1-63858-542-8
12. "Madness" (狂気, Kyōki); 13. "Dearest Wish" (悲願, Higan); 14. "The Golden Thread" (金の糸, Kin no Ito)); 15. "Infatuation on Harajuku's Takeshita Street" (原宿竹下通りの執心, Harajuku Takeshita Dōri no Shūshin)
5	July 4, 2018	978-4-08-881425-4	April 18, 2023	978-1-68579-595-5
16. "Kabane's Long Day" (夏羽の長い一日, Kabane no Nagai Ichinichi); 17. "Reunion" (再会, Saikai); 18. "The Stone That Brings Death" (死をもたらす石, Shi o Motarasu Ishi); 19. "Body on Fire" (炎の屍, Honō no Kabane); Extra. "Kemono Office Payday" (怪物屋の給料日, Kemono-ya no Kyūryōbi)
6	November 2, 2018	978-4-08-881628-9	July 4, 2023	978-1-68579-704-1
20. "One Person" (ひとり, Hitori); 21. "Operation: Let's All Be Friends" (みんななかよし大作戦, Min'na nNakayoshi dai Sakusen); 22. "Off to Yashima" (いざ屋島, Iza Yashima); 23. "Training" (鍛錬, Tanren)
7	March 4, 2019	978-4-08-881773-6	September 19, 2023	978-1-68579-906-9
24. "A Bad Girl" (悪い子, Warui ko); 25. "Virtual Reality" (仮想現実, Kasō Genjitsu); 26. "Favorite" (一番, Ichiban); 27. "Ambition" (野望, Yabō)
8	July 4, 2019	978-4-08-881892-4	October 24, 2023	979-8-88843-039-2
28. "Snakes in Cinders" (灰塵の蛇, Kaijin no Hebi); 29. "Special Forces" (捜査特課, Sōsa Toku-ka); 30. "Counterattack" (逆襲, Gyakushū); 31. "Left Side" (左, Hidari)
9	November 1, 2019	978-4-08-882115-3	January 2, 2024	979-8-88843-095-8
32. "On the Move" (東奔西走, Tōhonseisō); 33. "Gambler" (博徒, Bakuto); 34. "Meet Up" (合流, Gōryū); 35. "Idiots" (馬鹿, Baka)
10	March 4, 2020	978-4-08-882236-5	March 5, 2024	979-8-88843-361-4
36. "Bad Habits" (悪癖, Akuheki); 37. "Fiend" (魔物, Mamono); 38. "Crystal Flower" (不香の花, Fukyō no Hana); 39. "Love" (愛情, Aijō)
11	July 3, 2020	978-4-08-882356-0	June 4, 2024	979-8-88843-637-0
40. "His Goddess" (女神, Megami); 41. "Someone Dear to You" (大切な人, Taisetsu na Hito); 42. "The Rose and the Sun" (薔薇と太陽, Bara to Taiyō); 43. "Strength" (逆鱗, Gekirin)
12	November 4, 2020	978-4-08-882438-3	August 6, 2024	979-8-88843-854-1
44. "Wrath" (逆鱗, Gekirin); 45. "The Time-Giving Gourd" (時渡しの瓢箪, Tokiwata shi no Hyōtan); 46. "Weapons" (武器, Buki); 47. "Friends" (友達, Tomodachi)
13	February 4, 2021	978-4-08-882558-8	October 8, 2024	979-8-89160-185-7
48. "Blazing Autumn Leaves" (照紅葉, Terumomiji); 49. "Awakening" (覚醒, Kakusei); 50. "Mission" (使命, Shimei)
14	July 2, 2021	978-4-08-882675-2	December 3, 2024	979-8-89160-186-4
51. "Reverse Yashima" (裏屋島, Ura Yashima); 52. "Charge" (突入, Totsunyū); 53. "Totsuka" (十拳(とつか), Totsuka); 54. "Caliber" (器(うつむ), Utsumu); 55. "The Wind That Fans the Flames of Hell" (業(ごう)火(か)を熾(おこ)す風(かぜ), Gōka o Okosu Kaze)
15	November 4, 2021	978-4-08-882809-1	March 11, 2025	979-8-89160-893-1
56. "Beast" (獸(けもの), Kemono); 57. "Fallen Stars" (落星(おちばし), Ochibashi); 58. "A Choice" (選択(せんたく), Sentaku); 59. "Raiden" (頼(らい)電(でん), Raiden)
16	April 4, 2022	978-4-08-883056-8	May 6, 2025	979-8-89160-949-5
60. "Mei" (鳴, Mei); 61. "One-on-One" (ー対ー, ーTaiー); 62. "Crazy for You" (Crazy for you); 63. "Tuna Onigiri" (綱鬼切, Tuna onigiri); 64. "The Deal" (取(とり)引(ひき), Torihiki)
17	September 2, 2022	978-4-08-883206-7	July 15, 2025	979-8-89373-007-4
65. "Partners" (相(あい)棒(ぼう), Aibō); 66. "Tanuki" (狸(たぬき), Tanuki); 67. "The Witches' Village" (魔(ま)女(じょ)の古(ふる)里(さと), Majo no Furusato); 68. "Before the Banquet" (宴(うたげ)の前(まえ), Utage no Mae); 69. "Nameless Flower" (名(な)無(な)き花(はな), Na naki Hana)
18	February 3, 2023	978-4-08-883314-9	October 21, 2025	979-8-89373-647-2
70. "The Abyss" (深(しん)淵(えん), Shin'en); 71. "Wicked Woman" (悪(あく)女(じょ), Akujo); 72. "Mad Party" (狂(きょう)宴(えん), Kyōen); 73. "Freedom" (自(じ)由(よう), Jiyū); 74. "Retribution" (罰(ばち), Batsu)
19	July 4, 2023	978-4-08-883497-9	December 16, 2025	979-8-89373-648-9
75. "The Caged Bird Longs for the Skies" (籠(ろう)鳥(ちょう)雲(くも)を恋(こ)う, Rōchō Kumo wo Kou); 76. "Prepared for the Worst" (覚(かく)悟(ご), Kakugo); 77. "Prayers" (祈(いの)り, Inori); 78. "Liar" (嘘(うそ)つき, Usotsuki); 79. "The Die Is Cast" (振(ふ)られた賽(さい), Furareta Sai)
20	December 4, 2023	978-4-08-883695-9	March 17, 2026	979-8-89373-649-6
80. "A Certain Kemono" (ある怪(け)物(もの), Aru Kemono); 81. "Rose on the Heath" (荒(こう)野(や)の薔(ば)薇(ら), Kōya no Bara); 82. "The Plan" (計(けい)画(かく), Keikaku); 83. "Mamono" (真(ま)物(もの), Mamono); 84. "They Who Rule the Sea" (海(うみ)を統(す)べる者(もの), Umi wo suberumono)
21	May 2, 2024	978-4-08-883890-8	June 23, 2026	979-8-89373-650-2
85. Nichijō (日(にち)常(じょう)); 86. Yake Bokkui (焼(やけ)木(ぼっ)杭(くい)); 87. Sōyō no Osa (霜(そう)葉(よう)の長(おさ)); 88. Kyūso (窮(きゅう)鼠(そ)); 89. Jōriku (上(じょう)陸(りく))
22	November 1, 2024	978-4-08-884215-8	September 22, 2026	979-8-89561-368-9
90. Senshū (千(せん)秋(しゅう)); 91. Kabane (屍(かばね)); 92. Kōmyō (光(こう)明(みょう)); 93. Sarumawashi no en (猿(さる)回(まわ)しの園(その)); 94. Kirei Goto (綺(き)麗(れい)事(ごと))
23	May 2, 2025	978-4-08-884420-6	December 1, 2026	979-8-89765-221-1
95. Minna Shinun Janē (みんな死(し)ぬんじゃねえ); 96. Hitotoshite (人(ひと)として); 97. Kimi ga Tame (君(きみ)が為(ため)); 98. Koku Itsu Koku (刻(こく)一(いっ)刻(こく)); 99. Kisaku (奇(き)策(さく)); 100. Shikiten (式(しき)典(てん))
24	December 4, 2025	978-4-08-884705-4	March 23, 2027	979-8-89863-593-0
101. Shutsugeki (出(しゅつ)擊(げき)); 102. Tairitsu to Wakai (懺(ざん)悔(げ)); 103. Ao no Hate de Kimi o Omou (青(あお)の果(は)てで君(きみ)を想(おも)う); 104. Kōsa (交(こう)差(さ)); 105. Saikyō (最(さい)強(きょう))
25	August 4, 2026	978-4-08-885046-7	—	—
106. Hai no Kanmuri (灰(はい)の冠(かんむり)); 107. Shūketsu (集(しゅう)結(けつ)); 108. Bakenokawa (化(ば)けの皮(かわ)); 109. Kansha (感(かん)謝(しゃ)); 110. Majinai (呪(まじな)い); 111. Yaka shō Fujin (野火焼不尽)

=== Anime ===
An anime television series adaptation was announced at the Jump Festa '20 event on December 21, 2019. The series is animated by Ajiado and directed by Masaya Fujimori, with Noboru Kimura handling series composition, and Nozomi Tachibana designing the characters. The series aired from January 10 to March 28, 2021, on Tokyo MX, ytv, and BS11. Funimation licensed the series and is streaming it on its website in North America and the British Isles, in Europe through Wakanim, and in Australia and New Zealand through AnimeLab. Following Sony's acquisition of Crunchyroll, the series was moved to Crunchyroll. Muse Communication has acquired the series in Southeast Asia and South Asia, and is streaming it on their Muse Asia YouTube channel, and Bilibili in Southeast Asia. The opening theme song is "Kemono Michi" (ケモノミチ; 'Path of The Beast'), performed by Daisuke Ono, and the ending theme song is "Shirushi" (－標－; 'Mark'), performed by Sayaka Sasaki.

==== Episodes ====
No.	Title	Directed by	Written by	Original release date
1	"Kabane"; Transliteration: "Kabane" (Japanese: 夏羽)	Shinpei Matsuo	Noboru Kimura	January 10, 2021
Kohachi Inugami, an occult detective from Tokyo, arrives in a rural village to investigate livestock found dead with their organs removed, a recurring event during each full moon. At a village inn, he notes the treatment of Kabane Kusaka, a perpetually dirty boy nicknamed "Dorotabo". Inugami recognizes Kabane's pendant as a "lifestone", a gem that confirms he was not simply abandoned and which suppresses his true nature. When the innkeeper's son steals the necklace, it triggers Kabane's transformation into a ghoul. Inugami explains the boy is a hanyo, a hybrid of human and ghoul, and reveals his own non-human nature as a bakedanuki. After they dispatch the real culprit, a deer ghoul, Inugami reveals his original mission was to kill Kabane and shoots him. Kabane survives due to his ghoul heritage and later awakens in Tokyo, where Inugami welcomes him to his detective agency.
2	"The Kemonoist"; Transliteration: "Kemono-ya" (Japanese: 怪物屋)	Hodaka Kuramoto	Noboru Kimura	January 17, 2021
Inugami reintroduces himself as a "Kemonoist", an individual who resolves conflicts between Kemono and humankind to maintain coexistence. At the Inugami Strangeness Consulting Agency, Kabane meets two other members: the brusque hanyo Shiki Tademaru, who is part-Arachne, and the feminine Akira, a Snow Kemono or yukionoko descended from a yukionna. Kabane joins them on a case involving a violent sanshichu infestation that nearly killed a family and a responding officer. While normally harmless, the insects become dangerous when swarming over their preferred sustenance. After Shiki's spider thread fails, Kabane enters the infested room; his part-ghoul physiology makes him immune to pain. Inugami observes that Kabane's capacity for fear and revulsion was likely suppressed by his past abusive labor. The infestation is traced to a pair of stolen expensive shoes, as sanshichu feed on "guilt". Watching the reunited family, Kabane contemplates the possibility of having parents, a hope instilled by Inugami, which he also extends to Shiki. Meanwhile, Inugami reports to a mysterious woman regarding Kabane's arrival and his lifestone, questioning whether the boy represents a future threat or a source of hope.
3	"Foxes"; Transliteration: "Kitsune" (Japanese: 狐)	Yoshiki Kawasaki	Noboru Kimura	January 24, 2021
Inugami directs Kabane, Shiki, and Akira to Superintendent Yokō Inari, a kitsune who leads Shinjuku's police force. Guided by the kitsune girl Kon, Kabane meets Inari, who tricks him into surrendering his lifestone—a gem that suppresses a Kemono's thirst for human energy—and decapitates him. Kon then attempts to kill Shiki and Akira, but her disguise as Kabane fails, and she sets the building ablaze. Using his thread, Shiki retrieves the briefcase holding Kabane's head and throws it at Kon, enabling Kabane to attack her and render her unconscious. Exposed to open air, Kabane's head regenerates his body, leading Shiki to formally accept him as a partner. They exit the station with an unconscious Akira and meet Inugami, who had anticipated these events. Inari, planning to mass-produce the lifestone and disrupt human-Kemono relations, discovers the stone is a tanuki charm under an illusion cast by Inugami. Enraged, she kills her driver. Later, a wounded and hungry Kon invades the agency to claim Kabane's head, but Inugami subdues her. Their confrontation is interrupted by a human entering the premises, who carries the scent of Kemono.
4	"Mission"; Transliteration: "Ninmu" (Japanese: 任務)	Hidekazu Oka	Noboru Kimura	January 31, 2021
Inugami recruits Kon for a new mission, promising Kabane's head as a reward, and they attend to Yoruno, a man possessed by a nekomata hostess named Mao from Kabukichō who transforms clients into human-faced cats; though horrified, Yoruno chooses to live as a cat with her. Kabane, inspired by Akira's remark that children are born from love, joins the case to learn about his own parents, and Inugami gives Kon an illusion-disguised orange in place of Kabane's head, after which Kabane describes love as resembling "light" and decides to buy gifts for the agency. Subsequently, Akira, motivated by Kabane's progress, overcomes his aversion to unpleasantness to assist Inugami at the polluted Shibuya River, where frog Kemono are killing dam workers; in the tunnel, Akira reveals to Kabane his search for his missing twin brother and, when attacked, unleashes a powerful burst of ice that freezes the entire tunnel.
5	"Intrusion"; Transliteration: "Sen'nyū" (Japanese: 潜入)	Mihiro Yamaguchi	Noboru Kimura	February 7, 2021
6	"Awakening"; Transliteration: "Kakusei" (Japanese: 覚醒)	Yoshiki Kawasaki	Noboru Kimura	February 14, 2021
Shiki recalls a childhood fear of terrifying things, reasoning that his missing memory of separating from his mother must conceal a traumatic event. Mihai deliberately alerts their enemies to Shiki's location, prompting Akira and Kabane to search for him; they encounter one of the Kanonba sisters en route. Paralyzed inside a building by mosquito-derived venom, Shiki is taunted by Mihai until he provokes a reaction, breaking his own hand to regain movement. He then uses webs spun from his sweat to trap the scent-sensitive Erika. After Akira and Kabane regroup with Shiki, the eldest sister Reika appears, kills her siblings, and overpowers all three. To protect his friends, Kabane heeds Mihai's advice and channels his deepest desire—his need to protect—to awaken his Kemono strength, allowing him to defeat Reika. The kitsune Nobimaru arrives to dispose of the Kanonba and privately informs Kabane that Inari still seeks his lifestone but wishes to avoid Inugami's wrath, while confiding his own hatred for her. Days later, Kabane's concerned shadowing of Shiki annoys but touches their colleagues. Kabane then remembers a forgotten promise to Kon, finding her waiting faithfully with caught fish, though he admits he had forgotten their arrangement.
7	"Home"; Transliteration: "Kokyō" (Japanese: 故郷)	Shinpei Matsuo	Noboru Kimura	February 21, 2021
Inugami, Kabane, Akira, and Shiki visit Shiki's childhood village, where his uncle Akio recounts the deaths of Shiki's parents. At a waterfront tree, Shiki recalls a childhood memory of secretly following his mother to a rundown forest house, where he witnessed a horrific scene before being struck unconscious. Upon waking, Akio falsely claimed his mother had to leave. The kitsune Nobimaru reveals that experiments on spider silk capable of weaving human cells were suppressed by Inari to protect Kemono secrecy, and identifies Akio as the researcher. Confronted by Inugami, Akio admits Shiki's father died investigating a folklore golden spider web. To secure a future for Shiki, his mother consented to be Akio's test subject in artificially recreating the mutant spider's silk, enduring forced mating with other Kemono until her breakdown. Shiki, having repressed the trauma, eventually fled his uncle's home. Inugami orchestrated the return so Shiki could hear the truth, after which Shiki captures his uncle.
8	"Truth"; Transliteration: "Shinjitsu" (Japanese: 真実)	Hidekazu Oka	Noboru Kimura	February 28, 2021
9	"Family"; Transliteration: "Kazoku" (Japanese: 家族)	Naoki Murata	Noboru Kimura	March 7, 2021
10	"Twins"; Transliteration: "Futago" (Japanese: 双子)	Shinpei Matsuo	Noboru Kimura	March 14, 2021
11	"Memories"; Transliteration: "Kioku" (Japanese: 記憶)	Yūta Murano	Noboru Kimura	March 21, 2021
12	"Kemono Incidents"; Transliteration: "Kemono Jihen" (Japanese: 怪物事変)	Masaya Fujimori; Shinpei Matsuo	Noboru Kimura	March 28, 2021

== Reception ==
In 2018, the manga was ranked 13th in the print category of the Next Manga Awards. By March 2021, the manga had over 4.2 million copies in circulation. By January 2026, it had over 8 million copies in circulation.
