= King's Game The Animation =

Japanese anime television series

- Key visual

王様ゲーム ジ・アニメーション (Ōsama Gemu Ji Animēshon)
- Genre: Horror
- Light novel

Ousama Game
- Written by: Nobuaki Kanazawa
- Published by: Futabasha
- Original run: 2009 – 2015
- Volumes: 12
- Manga
- Written by: Nobuaki Kanazawa
- Illustrated by: Hitori Renda
- Published by: Futabasha
- Imprint: Action Comics
- Magazine: E☆Everystar
- Original run: 2011 – 2012
- Volumes: 5
- Manga

Ousama Game: Shuukyoku
- Written by: Nobuaki Kanazawa
- Illustrated by: Hitori Renda
- Published by: Futabasha
- Imprint: Action Comics
- Magazine: E☆Everystar
- Original run: 2012 – 2014
- Volumes: 5
- Manga

Ousama Game: Kigen
- Written by: Nobuaki Kanazawa
- Illustrated by: Jeita Yamada
- Published by: Futabasha
- Imprint: Action Comics
- Magazine: E☆Everystar
- Original run: 2014 – 2016
- Volumes: 6
- Manga

Ousama Game: Rinjou
- Written by: Nobuaki Kanazawa
- Illustrated by: Hitori Renda
- Published by: Futabasha
- Imprint: Action Comics
- Magazine: E☆Everystar
- Original run: January 22, 2015 – November 11, 2016
- Volumes: 4
- Anime television series
- Directed by: Tokhihiro Sasaki
- Produced by: List: Toshiyuki Onuma Yūji Yoshida Yasuhisa Kobayashi Hideaki Suzuki Naoki Abe Takayuki Spacey Yasuda Taiga Itō Gō Morita Naoki Ishihara Taisuke Hashirayama Kazufumi Kikushima Takayoshi Takeuchi Noritomo Isogai Toshimitsu Saegusa
- Written by: Kenji Konuta
- Music by: Naoyuki Osada
- Studio: Seven
- Licensed by: Crunchyroll; UK: Anime Limited
- Original network: AT-X, Tokyo MX, BS11
- Original run: October 5, 2017 – December 21, 2017
- Episodes: 12
- Live-action film
- Ōsama Game (film)
- icon

King's Game The Animation (王様ゲーム ジ・アニメーション, Ōsama Gemu Ji Animēshon) is a Japanese anime television series adaptation of the Ōsama Game cell phone novel and the sequel, Ōsama Game: Extreme. It is animated by Seven.

== Plot ==
The students in Class 2-1 of Kure Academy receive cellphone messages from a person known only as the "King". The messages contain orders that the students must obey, lest they be punished with gruesome deaths. As part of the deadly "King's Game", the orders become more and more extreme as time goes on. One student, Nobuaki Kanazawa, having survived a previous game, is determined to put a stop to the carnage befalling his class.

== Characters ==
=== Main characters ===
Nobuaki Kanazawa (金沢 伸明, Kanazawa Nobuaki)
Voiced by: Mamoru Miyano (Japanese); Comona Lewin (Credited as Coby Lewin) (English)
A student of Tamaoka High School and a participant of the first King's Game. Due to the resultant trauma, Nobuaki transferred to Kure Academy. He was a cheerful student with many friends prior to the first King's Game. At his new school, Nobuaki has difficulty making friends due to his aggressive nature and fear of losing those close to him. During the second King's Game, he tries to get everyone to cooperate to survive, only starting to earn trust after several classmates have died. He dies after his throat is slit during the final battle with Natsuko, and is seen in the afterlife, reunited with his deceased friends.
Ryou Sugisawa (杉沢 遼, Sugisawa Ryou)
Voiced by: Hiroyuki Kagura (Japanese); Justin Briner (English)
One of the last to die in the second King's Game. He has a crush on Teruaki and breaks down mentally after his death. Near the end, he resolves to sacrifice himself like Teruaki did and Nobuaki tried to do, so when the final order to create a doll from the students' limbs is given, he offers his own leg. Natsuko uses a chainsaw on him, causing him to bleed out and die.
Natsuko Honda (本多 奈津子, Honda Natsuko)
Voiced by: Yui Horie (Japanese); Bryn Apprill (English)
The main antagonist. She is an athletic and popular girl who initially projects a sweet and cheerful demeanor. It is revealed in the manga adaptations that she is Chiemi Honda's older sister, and that she is the sole survivor of a previous game. As a result, she tries to hide her trauma in hopes of having a normal school life, but reveals her true colors after Nobuaki refuses to cooperate with her during the Kure Academy King's Game. She was the antithesis of Nobuaki, firmly believing there can be only one survivor and that selfishness and betrayal are necessary for survival. During the final battle, she is fatally wounded by Riona, but slits Nobuaki's throat and professes her love for him before dying.
Chiemi Honda (本多 智恵美, Honda Chiemi)
Voiced by: Mao Ichimichi (Japanese); Alexis Tipton (English)
The late girlfriend of Nobuaki and the penultimate survivor of the first King's Game. She and Nobuaki were given a final order to kill the person they loved the most. Chiemi killed herself so Nobuaki could survive.
Naoya Hashimoto (橋本 直也, Hashimoto Naoya)
Voiced by: Shinnosuke Tachibana (Japanese); Howard Wang (English)
Nobuaki's late best friend and one of the last to die in the first King's Game. An order was issued in which a student needed to roll a die, and name a number of students equal to the number rolled, all of whom (including the roller) would die. Naoya sacrificed himself to roll the die.
Ria Iwamura (岩村 莉愛, Iwamura Ria)
Voiced by: Pile (Japanese); Mikaela Krantz (English)
The third-from-last survivor of the first King's Game. She was emotionally scarred due to being sexually abused by her father in her youth, resulting in her being quiet and aloof. She initially tried to beat the King's Game through independent research, but became open to cooperation once a few survivors remained. She revealed that the game originates from a virus that kills via suggestion, and tried to stop the game by deleting the virus from her laptop. This turned out to be a trap set by the King, and she was incinerated as punishment.
Riona Matsumoto (松本 里緒菜, Matsumoto Riona)
Voiced by: Akari Uehara (Japanese); Tabitha Ray (English)
The final survivor of the second King's Game. During the game, she does research and shares information with Nobuaki. She initially acts tough and makes Nobuaki use the honorific -san suffix when addressing her, but gradually softens and even develops feelings for him. After the final battle, she uses Nobuaki's body to weigh her down in the ocean, drowning herself in an attempt to stop the games from continuing elsewhere.
Kenta Akamatsu (赤松 健太, Akamatsu Kenta)
Voiced by: Yuusuke Sasaki (Japanese); Garrett Storms (English)
A participant of the second King's Game. He is a muscular student who acts as a 'big brother' figure to Nobuaki, defending him against their classmates' hostility. When Mitsuki broke her phone, Kenta, who was ordered by the King to give any classmate an order of his choice, gave himself an order to protect Mitsuki. He and Mitsuki accompany Nobuaki on a trip to Yonaki village to learn about the King's Game. He eventually dies after failing to protect Mitsuki.
Mitsuki Yukimura (雪村 美月, Yukimura Mizuki)
Voiced by: Suzuna Kinoshita (Japanese); Brittany Lauda (English)
A participant of the second King's Game. She is given an order to text 'DIE' to two other classmates, but resisted and broke her phone. She accompanies Nobuaki and Kenta on a trip to Yonaki Village, where she buys a new phone. At the village, she declares her love for Kenta and intends to text it to herself so they can both die together. Kenta knocks her out and sends the texts to Natsuko and himself in order to protect Mitsuki. However, only texts from her original phone qualify, and she dies with Kenta anyway.
Teruaki Nagata (永田 輝晃, Nagata Teruaki)
Voiced by: Ryōta Suzuki (Japanese); Matt Shipman (English)
A participant of the second King's Game. He aspires to be a hairstylist. After being assaulted by Natsuko due to an earlier King's order and having his phone stolen, he defied Natsuko and tried to kill her by assigning negative points to her during the finger-breaking game, which was unsuccessful thanks to her convincing of Aimi to save her. Later, Natsuko tampered with Teruaki's phone to block the King's message, resulting in Teruaki de facto breaking the rule of attempting to quit the King's Game, resulting in his death.

=== Other characters ===
Nami Hirano (平野 奈美, Hirano Nami)
Voiced by: Minori Suzuki (Japanese); Jill Harris (English)
Nami Hirano is a student in the first King's game. She had an order to give herself an order, so she decided to find and touch the King after being convinced by Nobuaki that the King was a student in the class. It turned out unsuccessful and her punishment was to go blind. The next day, she committed suicide by drowning to help Nobuaki obey his order of losing something important to him.
Daisuke Tasaki (田崎 大輔, Tazaki Daisuke)
Voiced by: Hisayoshi Suganuma (Japanese); Dallas Reid (English)
Daisuke Tasaki is Nobuaki's late friend in the first King's Game. His family is very rich and he aspires to be a musician. He had sex with classmate Shouta's girlfriend Misaki due to the King's order. As a result, when Shouta was ordered by the King to assign an order to anybody in the class, he ordered Daisuke to die, resulting in his death.
Shouta Yahiro (八尋 翔太, Yahiro Shota)
Voiced by: Shuta Morishima (Japanese); Austin Tindle (English)
Shouta Yahiro is a participant in the first King's game. He ordered Daisuke to die after Daisuke had sex with his girlfriend Misaki due to the King's order. He later died as punishment for blocking the King's messages.
Misaki Nakajima (中島 美咲, Nakajima Misaki)
Voiced by: Risa Yuzuki (Japanese); Jad Saxton (English)
Misaki Nakajima is amongst the first victims of the first King's Game. The girlfriend of Shouta. She was nominated in Order 4, and laughed with Mami about having sex with Daisuke, but when she heard about Hideki and Satomi's suicides, she became frightened, thinking that if she didn't follow the orders, she would die like Hideki and the others, so she called Daisuke by email and obeyed the orders. In the popularity vote in Order 6, she was unsure, saying "I can't choose either," but after being persuaded by Nobuaki, she decided to vote for Naoya. In Order 11, she committed an unnecessary act and was punished by decapitation, resulting in her death. Nobuaki cried when Shouta, who she was dating, died as a result of the punishment, and believed that he had been punished.
Yousuke Ueda (上田 陽介, Ueda Yosuke)
Voiced by: Yuma Uchida (Japanese); Alejandro Saab (English)
Yousuke Ueda is a participant in the first King's Game. He was close friends with and secretly in love with Kaori Maruoka. He helped Nobuaki do research about the King's Game and found out that it was originally played in a distant village. He died shortly after when he broke the order do avoid doing an unnecessary action, which was crying.
Kaori Maruoka (丸岡 香織, Maruoka Kaori)
Voiced by: Mariko Honda (Japanese); Genna Ford (English)
Kaori Maruoka is a student in the first King's game. She looked up to Yousuke who helped stand up to her in elementary school. When Yousuke died, she thought Nobuaki killed him so she tried to kill him. Eventually she died from breaking the rule to avoid doing the unnecessary action of crying after Nobuaki told her that Yousuke loved her and told Nobuaki to protect her after his death.
Emi Miyazaki (宮崎 絵美, Miyazaki Emi)
Voiced by: Misaki Suzuki (Japanese); Emily Fajardo (English)
Emi Miyazaki is a student in the first King's game. She is dating Takayuki. Because she committed an unnecessary act under Order 11, she was punished by being torn to pieces and died. Nobuaki sheds tears when Takayuki, who she was dating, is punished and dies, believing that she was punished.
Kana Ueda (上田 佳奈, Ueda Kana)
Voiced by: Yui Makino (Japanese); Megan Emerick (English)
Kana Ueda is a participant in the first King's Game. She lost a popularity contest ordered by the King and committed suicide by jumping out of the window, before seeing the punishment.
Satomi Ishii (石井 里美, Ishii Satomi)
Voiced by: Miyuu Tsuji (Japanese); Dawn M. Bennett (English)
Satomi Ishii is amongst the first victims in the original King's Game. She died as punishment for not letting Hideki Toyoda touch her breasts.
Hideki Toyoda (豊田 秀樹, Toyota Hideki)
Voiced by: Kenji Akabane (Japanese); Ricco Fajardo (English)
Hideki Toyoda is amongst the first victims of the first King's Game. He died as punishment for not touching Satomi's breasts.
Yuusuke Kawakami (河上 勇佑, Kawakami Yusuke)
Voiced by: Kimito Totani (Japanese); Daman Mills (English)
Yuusuke Kawakami is amongst the first victims in the original King's Game. He has a self-centered personality. In Command 7, he begs Akira to punish Nobuaki so that he can be saved. He was talking with Shouta and Takayuki about what would happen if they designated King Mail as a domain, but Yusuke did not reject the email. However, in Command 11, he commits an unnecessary act and is punished by being torn to pieces. When asked what he did on the phone with Nobuaki, he replies that he did nothing, and while calling for help, he is dismembered and dies. Later, when Nobuaki sees the email and learns that his friend has been punished, he sheds tears and believes that he has been punished.
Minako Nakao (中尾 美奈子, Nakao Minako)
Voiced by: Mikoi Sasaki (Japanese); Sarah Wiedenheft (English)
Minako Nakao is a student in the first King's Game. She was Chia Kawano's best friend and was a victim in the dice roll order just like Chia.
Mami Shirokawa (城川 真美, Shirokawa Mami)
Voiced by: Yuka Ōtsubo (Japanese); Felecia Angelle (English)
Mami Shirokawa is a student in the first King's game. She is a leader among the girls in her class. she is a beautiful woman with blonde-haired.
Masami Matsumoto (松本 雅美, Matsumoto Masami)
Voiced by: Miyu Tomita (Japanese); Sara Ragsdale (English)
Masami Matsumoto is a student in the first King's game. She slit her wrists on the night of the dice roll order, likely as an attempted suicide. She ended up dying for good when she was named in the dice roll.
Chia Kawano (川野 千亜, Kawano Chia)
Voiced by: Ami Fukushima (Japanese); Natalie Hoover (English)
Chia Kawano is a student in the first King's game. She vocally despised Abe Owata and was quick to call out his behavior at the dice roll order. She ended up amongst the victims of the order along with Abe.
Hiroko Yamaguchi (山口 寛子, Yamaguchi Hiroko)
Voiced by: Miya Amamiya (Japanese); Kristen McGuire (English)
Hiroko Yamaguchi is amongst the first victims in the original King's Game. She has a strong personality. In Command 11, Nobuaki calls her and tells her that the rule violations were to specify King Mail as a domain and to cancel their cell phone contracts, and she bursts into tears, asking "Is that what Yuusuke and his friends were punished for?" After the phone call, she is punished with a heart attack for having done something unnecessary. Nobuaki calls her again, but she replies that she didn't do anything. After her second phone call with Nobuaki, she dies. Later, Nobuaki sheds tears at his friends' punishment and believes that he was punished.
Keita Yamashita (山下 敬太, Yamashita Keita)
Voiced by: Yuusuke Nagano (Japanese); John Wesley Go (English)
Keita Yamashita is a participant in the first King's game. He was Naoya's friend, but at the dice roll order, his name was unintentionally called by Naoya, resulting in his death.
Hirofumi Inoue (井上 浩文, Inoue Hirofumi)
Voiced by: Suguru Narisawa (Japanese); Brandon McInnis (English)
Hirofumi Inoue is a student in the first King's game. He died for breaking the order to avoid doing an unnecessary action, which was crying. He is a self-confessed "crybaby".
Fujioka Toshiyuki (俊之 藤岡, Toshiyuki Fujioka)
Voiced by: Kōdai Sakai (Japanese); Jean-Luc Hester (English)
Fujioka Toshiyuki is a student in the first King's game. He was Abe Owata's friend who died alongside him in the dice roll order.
Abe Owata (利幸 阿部, Owata Abe)
Voiced by: Yoshitsugu Matsuoka (Japanese); Brian Olvera (English)
Abe Owata is a student in the first King's game. He became crazed at the dice roll order by trying to force others to roll the die, including his best friend Fujioka Toshiyuki. After being called out as a coward by everyone, he threatens everyone by trying to kill Chiemi, which forces Naoya to step up to roll the die. He died for being amongst the ones named by Naoya.
Akira Oono (大野 明, Oono Akira)
Voiced by: Fukushi Ochiai (Japanese); Brad Smeaton (English)
Akira Oono is a student in the first King's game. love with Kana Ueda. he died for breaking an order to avoid doing an unnecessary action, which was crying. This is different than the manga where he died in a paper-drawing game order where all the boys had to take turns choosing to either take 1, 2, or 3 sheets of paper. In the end whoever who had to take the 100th sheet got punished.
Shingo Adachi (安達 信吾, Adachi Shingo)
Voiced by: Shinya Hamazoe (Japanese); Dalton Tindall (English)
Shingo Adachi is a student in the first King's Game. He was given an order to text 'DIE' to two other classmates. He had a fight with his friends when debating whom to text DIE to, which eventually resulted in him falling down a flight of stairs and dying.
Akemi Kinoshita (木下 明美, Kinoshita Akemi)
Voiced by: Konomi Yuuzaki (Japanese); Jennifer Alyx (English)
Akemi Kinoshita is amongst the first victims in the original King's Game. She was named in Order 10, and in order to protect himself, she was the first to comply, sending an email to Shingo and Maki telling them to "die". At the same time that Order 11 was given, she was punished by drowning for breaking the rules, and died. Nobuaki believes that she was given an order similar to Order 10, and canceled his cell phone contract out of fear that she would be killed. The text of the unsent email is unknown.
Aimi Murazumi (村角 愛美, Murazumi Aimi)
Voiced by: Ibuki Kido (Japanese); Lindsay Seidel (English)
Aimi Murazami is a student and Natsuko's best friend in Class 2-1 of Kure Academy. At the finger-breaking game, she initially refused to break her fingers to save Natsuko but Natsuko forcefully reminded her of the time they became best friends when Natsuko convinced the initially shy and weak Aimi to come out of her shell and participate in sports, so she ended up saving her. She disliked Nobuaki's aloof nature at first but eventually becomes grateful of his attempts to save everyone, especially at the racing order where Nobuaki tried to carry her. So when either Riona or Nobuaki were destined to die for being furthest away from the mountain, she sacrificed herself by running backwards.
Yuuna Kobayashi (小林 優奈, Kobayashi Yuna)
Voiced by: Megumi Nakajima (Japanese); Megan Shipman (English)
Yuuna Kobayashi is a student in Class 2-1 in Kure Academy. She initially appeared to be friends with Natsuko and participated in the relay race with her at the sports festival, but soon began distrusting her after she showed her true colors after the King's Game has begun. Natsuko used that to her advantage by using reverse psychology to convince her to go the wrong path up the mountain. She eventually falls off a cliff, and gets punished for failing to reach the summit in 24 hours.
Haruka Momoki (桃木 遥香, Momoki Haruka)
Voiced by: Kazusa Aranami (Japanese); Jessica Peterson (English)
Haruka Momoki is a student of Class 2-1 in Kure Academy. Her order was to let Tsubasa touch her chest, but the order was not doable because Tsubasa had already died, so as a result, she died.
Aya Kuramoto (倉本 綾, Kuramoto Aya)
Voiced by: Saki Fujita (Japanese); Amber Lee Connors (English)
Aya Kuramoto is a student of Class 2-1 in Kure Academy. Her order was to lose something precious to her. She tried to obey the order by killing her parents but was unsuccessful. In the end she had to kill her dog, which she resisted, resulting in her death.
Nanami Takumi (宅見 七海, Takumi Nanami)
Voiced by: Rie Hanafusa (Japanese); Skyler McIntosh (English)
Nanami Takumi is a student of Class 2-1 in Kure Academy. In Order 2, she fell asleep before Nobuaki could contact him and was punished by hanging and died. Later, her body is discovered by Aya and her parents who came to pick her up. In a class photo, she and Aimi are posing next to Natsuko with their shoulders touching, so it seems they were good friends.
Aya Matsuoka (松岡 彩, Matsuoka Aya)
Voiced by: Yuka Ozaki (Japanese); Jeannie Tirado (English)
Aya Matsuoka is a student and amongst the last survivors of Class 2-1 of Kure Academy. Facing the final order from the King, after seeing Natsuko maniacally help her friend Ryou sacrifice himself by cutting his leg, tries to stop Natsuko by strangling her. Natsuko immediately kills her by slicing her torso.
Rina Minami (南 理奈, Minami Rina)
Voiced by: Kana Yūki (Japanese); Heather Walker (English)
Rina Minami is a student of Class 2-1 of Kure Academy. Under the King's order to race up Mt. Nuegarebi, she encounters her struggling classmates Takuya and Yuuna, but refuses to save Takuya for what he did to Masatoshi and gives up saving Yuuna after struggling to stop her from falling off a cliff. She then encounters Natsuko who provokes her by asking if her classmates' deaths were in vain and asking if she has the willpower to kill all her remaining classmates to win the game. In a guilt-driven panic, she runs back to try to save them but trips over a branch and falls over a cliff.
Tsubasa Furusawa (古澤 翼, Furusawa Tsubasa)
Voiced by: Masashi Uchida (Japanese); Stephen Sanders (English)
Tsubasa Furusawa is a student amongst the first casualties of the King's game in Class 2-1 of Kure Academy. He died for disobeying the order of not falling asleep. Nobuaki tried to save him by barging into his house, but was too late.
Masatoshi Ooi (大居 勝利, Ooi Masatoshi)
Voiced by: Yuu Sanada (Japanese); Kyle Phillips (English)
Masatoshi Ooi is a student in Class 2-1 of Kure Academy. At the racing order, he got shoved down a flight of stairs by classmate Takuya, resulting in him being close to last place. He tries to sacrifice himself by jumping into the ocean, but Nobuaki follows him and tries to save him, but was unsuccessful. However, Masatoshi turns out to have lived just long enough to get punished at the first 8-hour mark, saving Nobuaki and Riona.
Takuya Sakamoto (坂本 拓哉, Sakamoto Takuya)
Voiced by: Satoshi Hino (Japanese); Clifford Chapin (English)
Takuya Sakamoto is a student in Class 2-1 of Kure Academy. At the racing order, he shoved Masatoshi down a flight of stairs and ditched the group who tried to take care of him. As he approached the summit, he got stuck in a trap set up by Natsuko, who breaks his legs so he can no longer walk. Later, Rina catches up to him but refuses to save him because of what he did to Masatoshi. He eventually died as punishment for failing to reach the summit after 24 hours.
Yuuichi Satou (佐藤 勇一, Satou Yuuichi)
Voiced by: Tatsuhisa Suzuki (Japanese); Jarrod Greene (English)
Yuuichi Satou is a student in Class 2-1 of Kure Academy. He led the class in confronting Nobuaki for first trying to convince them the King's Game is real, and then for suspecting Nobuaki is the King himself after some classmates had died. While beating up Nobuaki, he died for breaking an unspecified order.
Toshifumi Sakakibara (榊原 俊文, Sakakibara Toshifumi)
Voiced by: Hayato Horiuchi (Japanese); Orion Pitts (English)
Toshifumi Sakakibara is a student in class 2-1 of Kure Academy. He died for breaking an unspecified order in the second day of the King's Game.
Tatsuya Jinba (神馬 達也, Jinba Tatsuya)
Voiced by: Yuusuke Tonozaki (Japanese); Anthony Bowling (English)
Tatsuya Jinba is a student in class 2-1 of Kure Academy. He died an unspecified death on the second day of the King's Game.
Daiki Kurosawa (黒澤 大輝, Kurosawa Daiki)
Voiced by: Hitoshi Horinouchi (Japanese); Chris Thurman (English)
Daiki Kurosawa is a student in class 2-1 of Kure Academy. A male student wearing glasses. he is burned to death as punishment for disobeying the King's orders in Order 2. It is likely that he fell asleep before midnight after leaving the park.
Shin Takada (高田 真, Takada Shin)
Voiced by: Makoto Takada (Japanese); Tyler Walker (English)
Shin Takada is a student in class 2-1 of Kure Academy. in the An original character for the anime. A male student wearing glasses. In Order 2, he fell asleep before Nobuaki could contact him and was punished by hanging and died.

== Media ==
=== Anime ===
On August 1, 2017, an anime television series adaptation by Seven was announced. It aired from October 5 to December 21, 2017. The series is directed by Tokihiro Sasaki and Kenji Konuta is in charge of series composition. Kan Soramoto and Yōsuke Itō are the character designers, and Soramoto is also credited as the chief animation director. The opening theme is "Feed the Fire" by Coldrain and the ending theme is "Lost Paradise" by Pile. It ran for 12 episodes. Crunchyroll streamed the series while Funimation have licensed the series and streamed an English dub. Anime Limited have licensed the series for a UK release.

No.	Title (Note: All English episode titles are taken from Crunchyroll.)	Original air date
1	"Begin Again (Break Again)"; Transliteration: "Saikai" (Japanese: 再壊)	October 5, 2017
High-school student Kanazawa Nobuaki transfers into a new school and distances himself from his new classmates. At midnight, he receives a text from someone called the King outlining the rules of a deadly game. Every student must participate and follow their given instructions, or face death. Nobuaki is ordered to kiss his classmate Honda Natsuko. His classmates, who all received the text, believe Nobuaki is joking and are annoyed when he tries to explain the game is real. Having played the game before, Nobuaki decides to break the rules and die, dooming Natsuko as well. However, with seconds to spare, Natsuko confesses her love and kisses him. Nobuaki realises several of his classmates had received different instructions and rushes to contact them, only to find several of them have hanged themselves in their bedrooms. Realising the game is real, the surviving students accuse Nobuaki of murder. One of his classmates, Satou Yuuichi, receives a text punishing him for breaking a rule, and immediately bleeds to death.
2	"Chaos (Scars Disorder)"; Transliteration: "Konran" (Japanese: 痕乱)	October 12, 2017
Natsuko realises she was instructed to have sex with Teruaki Nagata and panics. Nobuaki insists Natsuko and Taruaki must decide for themselves what they will do. Nobuaki has flashbacks to the first time he played the game and how his classmates immediately turned on each other after realising the game was real. He insists his new class must work together to survive the instructions, no matter what they are. Teruaki, desperate not to die, attempts to rape Natsuko. Natsuko suddenly overpowers Teruaki and becomes cold and hostile, having used the attempted rape to try force Nobuaki to reveal the secret to escaping the game, since he had survived it before. She swears she will survive no matter what and almost rapes Teruaki before pulling Nobuaki away from everyone else and criticising his intention to try and save everybody instead of focusing on his own survival. She loudly accuses him of trying to rape her himself, turning the whole class against him. She then tries to convince Mizuki, who received an instruction to text the word DIE to two other students, which would result in their death, to send the text to Nobuaki.
3	"Friendship (Melting Emotion)"; Transliteration: "Yūjō" (Japanese: 融情)	October 19, 2017
Akamatsu Kenta happens to see his classmates and Nobuaki gather at Bunko park, but then he sees that Nobuaki was hurt, and accuses the class of beating up Nobuaki. Annoyed, Natsuko tries to convince Mizuki to send DIE to Kenta and Nobuaki, but she refuses and smashes her phone on the floor, breaking it. Kenta then carries Nobuaki to the hospital and a terrified Mizuki comes along. Then, Mizuki, Kenta and Nobuaki all went to a deserted area where Kenta was assigned by the King to give an order to a classmate and they must follow it. He decides to give himself the order to protect Mizuki's life, to make her feel better. Then Nobuaki tells Kenta and Mizuki about another flashback of another of his classmates dying because they lost a popularity voting contest. Meanwhile, Natsuko picks up the phone Nobuaki dropped.
4	"Breakthrough (Solutions/Hades)"; Transliteration: "Kaimei" (Japanese: 解冥)	October 26, 2017
Nobuaki tells Kenta and Mizuki about a distant village, Yonkai, where the King's game was originally played, and they start travelling to Yonkai to get more information to end the game. On the lengthy train ride, Nobuaki has another flashback where he deduced the King is someone in his class, and his classmate Nami, who had to give herself an order, takes that advice and orders herself to touch the King. When she touches the King, a conformation text will be given, confirming their identity. Ria, a mysterious girl in class, states she is the King and asks if the class will kill her, since that would end the game. However, when she takes Nami's hand and touches herself with it, there is no confirmation text. Despite touching everyone in the class, nothing happened. That night, Nobuaki finds Nami to comfort her. Nami then gets a punishment to go blind, along with a taunt from the King that they were in the Class and the only way to find their identity was to hate each other. Nobuaki gets an order to lose something important. He tries to break all his possessions in his house, even break up with Chiemi, but his attempts were futile. Finally, he completed his order when Nami decided to help him by drowning herself.
5	"Wail (Karma/Tears)"; Transliteration: "Gōkyū" (Japanese: 業泣)	November 2, 2017
Ria calls Nami stupid for killing herself even though her punishment wasn't death. She repeats she is King, stating that since she made Nami touch her instead of letting her do it herself, it was not considered valid. However, Nobuaki still doesn't kill her. After tasing him, she scolds him for his lack of resolve, stating she isn't actually king but wants to enjoy the King's Game, which will be difficult to do if Nobuaki is so boring, and beat the King. Later, his classmate Yousuke begins doing research and finds information about the King's game, including the fact each classmate got a one-character text from the King before their death, and that the game was played 30 years ago in a village called Yonaki. Yousuke then dies, amongst almost half the class who broke the latest order not to do anything 'unnecessary', which was crying, deduced by Nobuaki. While waiting for the train to the village, Nobuaki gets hit in the head, and wakes up in a room with his hands tied. Kaori accuses Nobuaki of being the King and killing Yousuke. Nobuaki explains the situation and tells Kaori Yousuke likes her and he told Nobuaki to protect her if anything happened to him. His words cause Kaori to cry and she dies for breaking the rule.
6	"Revolt (Counter/Oppress)"; Transliteration: "Hangyaku" (Japanese: 反虐)	November 10, 2017
A new order was given in which one student has to roll a die, and name the number of students equal to the number rolled. The student who rolled the dice and those they named would all be punished. After a heated discussion culminating in Toshiyuki Abe threatening to kill Chiemi, Naoya steps up to roll the die. He rolled a 6 and all the remaining classmates ended up dying, except Nobuaki, Chiemi, and Ria. Ria uses the data collected between her and Yousuke and explains to Nobuaki the cause of the deaths was hypnosis from a computer virus linked to the King's Game, taking the power of suggestion to the extreme. It was so extreme, the body killed its own cells. A bacterial virus did the same thing to Yonaki village, but evolved into digital form, which would then be transmitted through text messages and continued to spread. How it evolved into that is unknown, but it is unlikely it could have done so without help. Ria developed an anti-virus that could eliminate all the Kings in the network by taking advantage of a bug in the program. She attempts to delete the virus, but is punished for attempting to stop the game. The "bug" itself was a trap set by the King. Before she dies, she tells Nobuaki she left behind a little insurance in case she lost. Nobuaki and Chiemi are the only ones left. Meanwhile, in present time, Mizuki gets a new phone and Nobuaki, Kenta, and her finally arrive at the bricked-up gate of Yonaki village.
7	"Eternity (Forever/Dread)"; Transliteration: "Eien" (Japanese: 永厭)	November 16, 2017
While exploring Yonaki village, now a decrepit ghost town, a house with the name 'Honda' catches Nobuaki's eye, and he goes in while Kenta and Mizuki wait outside. He discovers a few notes from what appears to be Chiemi's father and a picture with both the name Chiemi and Natsuko. He deduces Chiemi and Natsuko were sisters and their father is connected to the King's game, and from Natsuko's actions earlier, she may have also been a survivor of a King's game. Meanwhile, Mizuki experiences significant inner turmoil about whom to text DIE to, eventually deciding to text it to herself. She declares her love for Kenta, and that by sending those texts, they would die (because of Kenta failing his order) and be together forever. Angry about Mizuki's lack of resolve to live, Kenta knocks her out and sends the texts to himself and Natsuko instead on her phone. Nobuaki finds them, and they realize the texts didn't work because they were not sent from Mizuki's original phone, so Mizuki and Kenta both end up dying. Then Nobuaki gets a call from Natsuko on his own stolen phone, raping Teruaki while mocking Nobuaki of their deaths.
8	"Determination (Blood/Judgement)"; Transliteration: "Ketsudan" (Japanese: 血断)	November 23, 2017
Teruaki tries to call someone for help but Natsuko catches him and takes his phone too. Nobuaki finds hints from a notebook indicating that the characters appearing in the King's victims' phones is a bug and that mutation is a likely way to end the game. He rushes back to his hometown to share information after suddenly getting a call from classmate Riona Matsumoto who was doing research about the King's game. Riona reveals she knows about Natsuko's late classmate Ria, who was also collecting the characters from the victims. The message Ria spelled out was "those who have hope." They were remarkably similar to the ones Riona saw Natsuko looking at after Yuuichi died and may spell the same message. Natsuko gathers everybody at Bunko Park for the next order, where the class takes turns by seat order to break their fingers; the right fingers are worth +1 point each and left fingers -1 each, with the option to pass. At the end of the game, anyone with a negative point total is punished. Natsuko intends to use this to kill Nobuaki, but everyone passes. Then it is Teruaki's turn and he breaks one finger on his right hand and his entire left hand, giving Natsuko -5.
9	"Solidarity (Wedge/Binds)"; Transliteration: "Kessoku" (Japanese: 楔束)	November 30, 2017
Teruaki threatens to assign -5 points to Natsuko unless gives back their phones. She does so but Teruaki assigns +1 to Nobuaki, -4 to Natsuko, and -1 to her best friend Aimi. Natsuko passes rather than break her hand. The negative point to Aimi was a test Aimi asked for, to see if Natsuko would break a finger to save her, as Teruaki did to save Natsuko, which Natsuko failed. Everyone else passes and Aimi is the last person to take a turn. She is reluctant to break her entire hand to save herself and Natsuko. Natsuko coerces Aimi to think about when she has helped her in the past, and when that fails, tackles Aimi and pins her hand to the ground, crushing her entire right hand to save herself. Aimi defends Natsuko was just scared and they were still friends, giving Natsuko +4 and herself +1. Later, Nobuaki again convinces everyone to stick together to survive, but is dismissed by Natsuko insisting there can only be one survivor like in the previous King's games. Teruaki is punished because Natsuko blocked the King's message while she had his phone, punishment for his defiance of her, and he dies.
10	"Race (Evil/Run)"; Transliteration: "Kyōsō" (Japanese: 凶走)	December 7, 2017
The remaining 10 students are given an order to race to Mt. Nuegakubi, where every 8 hours the person farthest away gets punished. While Natsuko leaves everyone behind in the dust, Nobuaki repeatedly goes out of his way to help his classmates who are falling behind, despite them insisting multiple times that they don't need to be saved, insisting he could not bear to see anyone die anymore. His efforts winds him up amongst the students in last place, with Riona who lacks stamina and Masatoshi who got shoved down a flight of stairs by classmate Takuya. He also appears to have pushed himself to the limit as he begins to hallucinate. As they are running along the ocean, an exhausted Masatoshi becomes unconscious and falls off a bridge into the ocean. Nobuaki follows to save him but fails to do so and Masatoshi drowns. Riona then warms him up and Nobuaki regains his resolve to continue. As the 8-hour mark is imminent, Nobuaki deliberately stops to tie his shoelace, just as a death punishment text gets sent.
11	"Advance (Forward/Invade)"; Transliteration: "Zenshin" (Japanese: 前侵)	December 14, 2017
It turns out the punishment text was for Masatoshi. Riona is furious at Nobuaki for his insensitivity. After 8 more hours however, Nobuaki tries the same trick by running the opposite direction, but the text was instead sent for Aimi who was grateful for Nobuaki's earlier actions and sacrificed herself by running the opposite way. Nobuaki reveals to Riona the conclusion of his first King's game where he and Chiemi were given an order to kill the person they love the most, and Chiemi had killed herself for Nobuaki to survive, and Nobuaki got a text from the King with the choice to either continue the game or get punished. Meanwhile, Natsuko reaches the summit first and uses various tactics to deter her incoming classmates Takuya, Yuuna, and Rina, resulting in their deaths. Nobuaki and Riona catch up with Ryou and Aya, and within minutes before the 8-hour mark, approach the summit but Natsuko stands in the way. With just 5 students remaining, can Nobuaki put a stop to the murderous King's Game once and for all?
12	"Demise (End/Grudge)"; Transliteration: "Shūen" (Japanese: 終怨)	December 21, 2017
The gang overpowers Natsuko and reach the summit, just as they get their next order to cut their body parts to make a human doll. Ryou offers to sacrifice first so Natsuko helps him cut his leg using a chainsaw. Seeing Ryou dead, Aya tries to strangle Natsuko but Natsuko just cuts her body off with her chainsaw. With only Nobuaki, Riona, and Natsuko remaining, they finally calm down to brainstorm how to end the game once and for all. They combine the one-letter texts from the dead classmates and finally discover the truth about the King's Game: It is, in fact, an apocalyptic virus-type of game that will never end unless every player dies. If there is a survivor the virus is carried on by them and the game will continue until all of humanity is destroyed. The King's Game let Nobuaki survive his first game despite saying he would be punished because it needed a carrier. Natsuko tries to kill Nobuaki by strangling him for confirming her suspicions of false hope, but Riona attacks her with the chainsaw and fatally wounds her. With Natsuko seemingly dead, Riona begins declaring her love for Nobuaki but, using the last of her breath, Natsuko kills Nobuaki with the chainsaw, claiming she loved him first and refusing to let Riona take him. In the afterlife, Nobuaki is reunited with Chiemi and his other dead friends, who had waited for him. As the only survivor, Riona drags Nobuaki's corpse to the beach and commits suicide by drowning herself with Nobuaki's dead body. In the epilogue, somewhere in Japan, a random student gets a text from the King, saying the King's Game has begun once again.
