= Ladies versus Butlers! =

Japanese light novel series

- Ladies versus Butlers! light novel volume 1 cover featuring Tomomi Saikyō.

れでぃ×ばと! (Redi×Bato!)
- Genre: Harem, romantic comedy
- Light novel
- Written by: Tsukasa Kōzuki
- Illustrated by: Munyū
- Published by: ASCII Media Works
- Imprint: Dengeki Bunko
- Original run: September 10, 2006 – March 10, 2012
- Volumes: 13
- Manga
- Written by: Tsukasa Kōzuki
- Illustrated by: Nekoyashiki-Nekomaru
- Published by: ASCII Media Works
- Magazine: Dengeki Moeoh
- Original run: June 2008 – December 2008
- Volumes: 1
- Anime television series
- Directed by: Atsushi Ōtsuki
- Written by: Gō Tamai
- Music by: Kei Haneoka
- Studio: Xebec
- Licensed by: NA: Media Blasters
- Original network: AT-X
- English network: US: Toku
- Original run: January 5, 2010 – March 23, 2010
- Episodes: 12 + 6 specials
- icon

Ladies versus Butlers! (れでぃ×ばと!, Redi×Bato!) is a Japanese light novel series written by Tsukasa Kōzuki, with accompanying illustrations by Munyū. The series includes 13 novels released between September 2006 and March 2012, published by ASCII Media Works under their Dengeki Bunko imprint. A manga adaptation by the illustrator group Nekoyashiki-Nekomaru was serialized in ASCII Media Works' Dengeki Moeoh magazine issues between June and December 2008. A drama CD based on the novels was released in September 2009. An anime series adaptation produced by Xebec and directed by Atsushi Ōtsuki aired in Japan from January to March 2010. It has been licensed by Media Blasters for release in North America.

== Plot ==
Akiharu Hino lost his parents and is adopted by his uncle's family. He enters a boarding school, Hakureiryō Academy, because he does not want to burden his relatives. He takes the admission exam and successfully enters the House Management Department, where the school trains servants for high society. He wants to become a butler, but his delinquent appearance frightens the female students, who make up the majority students. Unable to accompany his classmates, Akiharu meets his childhood friend Tomomi Saikyō, a girl with a two-faced character who traumatized him many times when they were kids. Another girl, Selnia Iori Flameheart follows him because of his looks. Akiharu starts finding his feet at the school and his relationship with the girls improves.

== Characters ==
=== Servant-ed class ===
Akiharu Hino (日野 秋晴, Hino Akiharu)
Voiced by: Kazuyuki Okitsu (Japanese); Daniel J. Edwards (English)
The main protagonist of the story considered to be a delinquent, because of his red eyes and rough appearance (accented by a scar bisecting his left eyebrow). In contrast to his appearance, he has a caring personality, but he is dense in regard to girls and matters of the heart. Because of everyone's less than friendly perception of him, he is often falsely accused of perverted acts. He was tormented by his childhood friend Tomomi when they were younger. Now reacquainted, Tomomi is often behind the schemes leading to these misunderstandings.

He is well aware of Tomomi's convincing manipulative nature and devilish personality but is resigned to dealing with her pranks because she knows him so well that she is effectively blackmailing him into keeping quiet about her. On the brighter side, she tells him she will help him through to graduation, perhaps because she subconsciously cares for him, or simply because she enjoys having fun at school often just being around him.

Kaoru Daichi (大地 薫, Daichi Kaoru)
Voiced by: Rie Kugimiya (Japanese); Brittany Lauda (English)
Akiharu's roommate and fellow servant-ed student. Kaoru is actually a cross-dressing girl (because of a strict father, who told her to graduate from Hakureiryō as a man). She has many fans in the upper-ed section and is easily mistaken to be a boy. She is rather cold to Akiharu at first, but slowly opens up to him. She is always worried her gender will be exposed, especially with sharing a room with Akiharu. She is simultaneously relieved and rather upset when Akiharu sees her naked from the waist up and shows no reaction. She has unconsciously developed feelings for Akiharu, something she realized when responding to a love letter from another female student. She holds a black belt in an unspecified martial art and is implied to be the daughter of a dojo, as shown in a flashback.

Sanae Shikikagami (四季鏡 早苗, Shikikagami Sanae)
Voiced by: Ami Koshimizu (Japanese); Michele Knotz (English)
A clumsy maid at the academy who causes Akiharu much trouble. Her older sister, Saori, works at the upper-ed. She used to be in upper-ed herself, but because of her family falling on hard times, she was forced to transfer to servant-ed. She is very inept at the tasks typically required of a maid and usually ends up making a mess of things.

Shingo Todoroki (轟 慎吾, Todoroki Shingo)
Voiced by: Takafumi Kawakami (Japanese); Y. Chang (English)
A member of the academy's servant-ed class and one of the few boys in the entire school. He is an outright pervert who admits he only came to Hakureiryō because the girls who go to this school are either beautiful maids-in-training or high class ladies from prominent families. His perversion almost always causes him to sexually harass women and therefore invoke the wrath of Mikan.

Mitsuru Sanke (三家 満, Sanke Mitsuru)
Voiced by: Ayumi Fujimura (Japanese); Jesse Nowack (English)
A member of the academy's servant-ed class and one of the few boys in the entire school. He is rather a darling of the ladies in the servant-ed class.

=== Upper-ed class ===
Tomomi Saikyō (彩京 朋美, Saikyō Tomomi)
Voiced by: Ayako Kawasumi (Japanese); Amber Lee Connors (English)
An upper-ed student at the academy and Akiharu's childhood friend. Her polite and refined attitude serves as a front to hide her true self: a manipulative deceiver. Her surname was Suzuhashi before her mother got remarried. She entertains herself by preying on other students (especially Akiharu and Selnia) by putting them in compromising situations (e.g. groping, sexual harassment, and nudity). Tomomi is perfectly willing to withhold information from everyone (as in the case of the Hino-Khadim scandal when she decided to keep silent despite having found out the Khadim family rules, only revealing what she knew when things were starting to get too complicated). In some cases she involves others in her schemes to achieve certain ends (as when she assigned Hino to stay with Mimina for a day in order to inspire her to draw). According to Akiharu, she is highly intelligent and also dislikes losing to other people. In the anime, a characteristic high-pitched giggle accompanied by a shadow and dark expression on her face signify that she is thinking evil thoughts. While on a date with her, Akiharu reveals that, despite her constant bullying in elementary school, he had in fact had a crush on her and his dream then had been to marry her when they grew up, which surprised and embarrassed Tomomi, perhaps showing that she reciprocates these feelings. This is further corroborated by her becoming jealous after seeing Selnia and Akiharu kiss.

Selnia Iori Flameheart (セルニア＝伊織＝フレイムハート, Serunia Iori Fureimuhāto)
Voiced by: Mai Nakahara (Japanese); Carrie Savage (English)
An upper-ed student at the academy. She is extremely proud of her status as scion of the Flameheart family. She is often the unfortunate target of the various misunderstandings involving Akiharu that are purposely caused by fellow student Tomomi Saikyo. While outwardly harsh and condescending towards Hino like assault, she continually expresses concern for him when he finds himself in less-than-desirable situations, though this is usually followed a blunt lecture or unnecessary violence. Her hairstyle is the reason why Akiharu refers to her as "Drill" (which upsets her). In the anime, her hair spins and make sounds similar to a drill whenever she is upset. She is shown to have strong feelings for Akiharu, exemplified in her kissing him and her rivalry with Tomomi for his affection. Even though she outwardly denies feeling anything for Akiharu, she does in fact realize and accept how she feels.

Pina Sformklan Estoh (ピナ＝スフォルムクラン＝エストー, Pina Suforumukuran Esutō)
Voiced by: Mai Goto (Japanese); Bryn Apprill (English)
The princess of a small country who transferred to Japan largely because of her love of anime. She openly asserts her pride in being an anime otaku, and has contempt for Japanese youths who can name any foreign opera or composer, yet do not even know the names of current anime in their own country. She is quite lonely since she has no one to talk to about anime, cosplay, or other otaku hobbies (other than the principal who shares her interests). She speaks in an "archaic dialect", mixing in words like "onushi" (お主; equivalent to "you") and adding "ja" (じゃ) at the end of sentences.

Mimina Ōsawa (桜沢 みみな, Ōsawa Mimina)
Voiced by: Rina Hidaka (Japanese); Daisy Guevara (English)
A 19 year-old student who appears to be about 10 due to an illness, which has kept her in hospital for most of her life. She developed her talent for drawing to stave off boredom in the hospital and has become quite talented but she hates having to draw for the sake of others, wanting to only draw what she likes. Although she dislikes Akiharu at first, she starts to develop feelings for him when he stands up for her, telling other students that she draws for her own pleasure, not theirs, and to let her draw whatever she wants to.

Ayse Khadim (アイシェ＝ハディム, Aishe Hadimu)
Voiced by: Kana Hanazawa (Japanese); Michaela Amanda Laws (English)
A shy foreign student who hardly talks to anyone but her bodyguard. When Akiharu unintentionally walks in on her while she is changing in a classroom, her bodyguard immediately tries to kill him due to her family's customs that a man who sees a woman's skin must either marry her or be killed. When Ayse stops her bodyguard from killing Akiharu, he is immediately named as Ayse's fiancé. Unknown to everyone else who tries to break the engagement, Ayse is in love with Akiharu and wants to marry him regardless of her family's customs. She confesses to him and has resolved to wait for him to come to love and choose her.

Suiran Fō (鳳 水蘭, Fō Suiran)
Voiced by: Saori Hayami (Japanese); Emi Lo (English)
One of Selnia's closest friends who was born and raised in China until she enrolled at Hakureiryō. At times she utters Chinese words and wears the qipao on occasion.

Saori Shikikagami (四季鏡 沙織, Shikikagami Saori)
Voiced by: Yūko Gotō (Japanese); Yara Naika (English)
The elder of the Shikikagami sisters but unlike her younger sister, she is an upper-ed student at the academy, having paid the required fees before their family fell on hard times. She is as ditzy as her younger sister although, unlike Sanae, her misadventures result in her perverted states of undress as she has a habit of taking her clothes off without minding where she is or who is present when she undresses.

Hedyeh (ヘディエ, Hedie)
Voiced by: Haruka Tomatsu (Japanese); Genevieve Simmons (English)
Ayse's ever-loyal bodyguard who faithfully protects and defends her mistress with a lethal-looking scimitar. When Hino accidentally saw Ayse naked, Hedyeh hounded him until Ayse gave up on him. Hedyeh tends to be extremely violent, acting before thinking; while she normally talks in a husky, low tone, her voice becomes quickly high-pitched when she is sufficiently agitated or is thinking of violence. She is always at Ayse's side.

Tōichirō Kazamatsuri (風祭 灯一郎, Kazamatsuri Tōichirō)
Voiced by: Shinji Kawada (Japanese); Brendan Hunter (English)
The only male member of the academy's upper-ed class. He considers himself as the most beautiful man and as such proclaims that he should be admired by everybody. Ironically, students usually avoid him because of this. His real name is actually Daikiji.

=== Others ===
Kaede Tenjōji (天壌慈 楓, Tenjōji Kaede)
Voiced by: Mariya Ise (Japanese); Melanie Ehrlich (English)
Hakureiryō Academy's principal whose hobbies include playing eroge even at work. Her otaku tendencies tend to get in the way of her work, and cause her react to situations like characters in her games do which usually leads to more misunderstandings. She is often reprimanded by Mikan, whom she is afraid of, and who strives to keep her focused on more serious matters. Kaede also sponsors the anime "Magical Diva" and as such has a large collection of items related to the anime including the original manuscript. She would like to discuss anime with Pina more than she already does, but is unable to do so easily because of Mikan, who keeps a close eye on her.

Mikan (深閑)
Voiced by: Kumi Sakuma (Japanese); Hazel Summer (English)
The academy's head instructor who oversees almost all matters related to the school. She is known for her mastery of all subjects related to becoming a maid or butler. She has a strict and cold demeanor, particularly towards anyone who slacks off and as such, the students, and even the principal herself, avoid provoking her wrath. She throws fountain pens with deadly accuracy much as a ninja uses throwing knives.

Anna (アンナ, Anna)
Voiced by: Akeno Watanabe (Japanese); Nicole Martino (English)
The head maid of the Flameheart family household. She is very close to Selnia and has watched over her since birth.

Natsume Hino (日野 棗, Hino Natsume)
Akiharu's cousin.

Mikako Saikyō (彩京 美佳子, Saikyō Mikako)

Tomomi's mother.

== Media ==
=== Light novels ===
Ladies versus Butlers! began as a series of light novels written by Tsukasa Kōzuki, with accompanying illustrations by Munyū. ASCII Media Works published thirteen novels under the Dengeki Bunko imprint from September 10, 2006 to March 10, 2012.

=== Manga ===
A manga adaptation by the illustrator group Nekoyashiki-Nekomaru was serialized in ASCII Media Works' Dengeki Moeoh seinen manga magazine between the June 2008 and December 2008 issues. A single tankōbon volume was released on December 18, 2009, under ASCII Media Works' Dengeki Comics imprint.

=== Drama CD ===
An hour-long drama CD based on the novels was released by ASCII Media Works on September 8, 2009. The drama CD was bundled with a booklet featuring material written by Tsukasa Kōzuki and illustrated by Munyū, a leaflet describing the characters, a small collection of rough sketches, and a set of postcards. The CD features three episodes, the second of which is an original story for the drama CD. The voice cast of the drama CD is the same as with the anime adaptation.

=== Internet radio show ===
An Internet radio show to promote the anime series and other Ladies versus Butlers! media called Mai's and Mariya's Radio versus Butlers! (麻衣と茉莉也のらじ×ばと!, Mai to Mariya no Raji×Bato!) aired 31 episodes from September 28, 2009 to May 31, 2010, hosted on the anime's official website. The show was streamed online every other Monday, and was hosted by Mai Goto and Mariya Ise. The show's theme song is "Arashi o Yobu Party Nau" (嵐を呼ぶパーティなう) sung by Goto and Ise.

=== Anime ===
A 12-episode anime television series produced by Xebec and directed by Atsushi Ōtsuki aired in Japan from January 5 to March 23, 2010, on AT-X. The first episode was given a special early broadcast on December 29, 2009, on AT-X. Six short bonus specials are included on Blu-ray. The anime was licensed by Media Blasters in North America. It was released on Blu-ray and DVD on November 3, 2015. The series premiered on Toku in the United States in January 2016.

==== Episode list ====
No.	Title	Original release date
1	"Boy Versus Lady"; Transliteration: "Bōi X Redi" (Japanese: ぼーい×れでぃ)	January 5, 2010
Akiharu Hino is a suspicious-looking boy who arrives at Hakureiryō Academy, a boarding school once known for only high-class young ladies. When he meets Selnia Iori Flameheart, she follows and falsely accuses him of being a delinquent. This causes an uproar throughout the campus until Akiharu meets his wicked childhood friend Tomomi Saikyo, who clears the misunderstanding by telling everyone about his future goal.
2	"Lady Versus Lady!"; Transliteration: "Redi X Redi!" (Japanese: れでぃ×れでぃ!)	January 12, 2010
Akiharu spends the first day training as a butler, and accompanying other servants, upper classmates, and eccentric personalities.
3	"Guard Versus Lady?"; Transliteration: "Gādo X Redi?" (Japanese: がーど×れでぃ?)	January 19, 2010
For the practical exam to prove their faithfulness, Akiharu accompanies Tomomi for an unusual task to follow Mimina Ōsawa, a little artist who has been hospitalized most of the time.
4	"Lady Versus Virgin?"; Transliteration: "Redi X Bājin?" (Japanese: れでぃ×ばーじん？)	January 26, 2010
Akiharu inadvertently sees Ayse Khadim naked. Due to her family's customs, Akiharu forcefully becomes engaged to her. That is, unless either Selnia or Tomomi can do something about it.
5	"Lady Versus Lady!!"; Transliteration: "Redi X Redi!!" (Japanese: れでぃ×れでぃ!!)	February 2, 2010
Upon seeing the score result for an exam, Selnia and Tomomi remark on their days since their first year meeting at Hakureiryō Academy, where they become rivals to see who is the most diligent and growing lady. When the school's water system is disabled, the students and staff members use an indoor natural hot spring for the time being, where the servants and uppers are getting into perversions.
6	"Secret Versus Boy?"; Transliteration: "Shīkuretto X Bōi?" (Japanese: しーくれっと×ぼーい?)	February 9, 2010
Akiharu's roommate, Kaoru Daichi, who in reality is a cross-dressing girl because of her father's strict desires, has an uncomfortable time cooperating with Akiharu. However, Kaoru has a chance to be a girl for one day at an upcoming ball for cross-dressing students.
7	"Lady Versus Magical"; Transliteration: "Redi X Majikaru" (Japanese: れでぃ×まじかる)	February 16, 2010
Pina Sformklan Estoh, an anime otaku princess, makes her move, much to Principal Kaede Tenjōji's enthusiasm. Suggesting that Akiharu and Tomomi assist her in helping to create her fabulous doujinshi, she recommends them to find suitable candidates for a cosplay photo gallery.
8	"Summer Versus Scandal"; Transliteration: "Samā X Sukyandaru" (Japanese: さまー×すきゃんだる)	February 23, 2010
Selnia invites Akiharu to the house for the next practical exam, leading to a "summer of love". Akiharu saves Selnia from drowning in the ocean near the beach, when she retrieves a bikini and suffers her immobilized legs.
9	"Date? Versus Chaste!"; Transliteration: "Dēto? X Cheisu!" (Japanese: でーと？×ちぇいす!)	March 2, 2010
After seeing Selnia kissing Akiharu, Tomomi's feelings for Akiharu reach breaking point. Tomomi invites Akiharu on a date, while Selnia follows them around town. By the end of the day, Tomomi and Akiharu talk about their childhood conflicts and Akiharu confirms that he wanted to be a "bride".
10	"Love Letter Versus Rhapsody"; Transliteration: "Rabu Retā X Rapusodi" (Japanese: らぶれたー×らぷそでぃ)	March 9, 2010
Kaoru discovers a love letter for her and is now in a predicament, whether to confess her true feelings or expose her gender. Akiharu and the boys try to give an advice for her.
11	"Lady Versus Lady!!!"; Transliteration: "Redi X Redi!!!" (Japanese: れでぃ×れでぃ!!!)	March 16, 2010
Having another usual day of butler duties, Pina gives Akiharu passport tickets to a special waterpark "Try Aqualand" as a gift. Tomomi and Selnia confront each other about their affection for Akiharu. Principal Kaede announces the annual sports day, so the girls use it as an opportunity to decide who goes with Akiharu since he only has two tickets. Upon reading the envelope paper sheet during the borrowing race, Selnia switches outfits with Mikan, causing Mikan to uncomfortably wear a sports outfit and Selnia for the maiden outfit.
12	"Lady Versus Battle!"; Transliteration: "Redi X Batoru!" (Japanese: れでぃ×ばとる!)	March 23, 2010
Akiharu, Selnia, and Tomomi spend the day at the racing sports match.
