= HuniePop =

2015 video game

- Kyu is depicted in the center of the cover art
- Developer: HuniePot
- Publisher: HuniePot
- Designer: Ryan Koons
- Programmer: Ryan Koons
- Artist: Rizky Prahesa
- Writer: Ryan Koons
- Composer: Jonathan Wandag
- Engine: Unity
- Platforms: Microsoft Windows, OS X, Linux
- Release: WW: January 19, 2015
- Genres: Erotic, Tile-matching, dating sim
- Mode: Single-player

HuniePop (/ˌhʌniːˈpɒp/, "HoneyPop") is a 2015 tile-matching and dating sim adult video game released for Microsoft Windows, macOS, and Linux-based personal computers. The game follows the dating adventures of the main character as they try to woo several different women in their home town; its characters are drawn in anime art style and they have a fully-voiced and animated dialog. HuniePop was created by American game designer Ryan Koons, under the alias of "HuniePot", after a successful crowdfunding campaign; it was released via Humble Bundle, MangaGamer, and a censored version via Steam. HuniePop received a positive critical reception.

== Gameplay ==
HuniePop gameplay, showing a date with Jessie Maye in a tennis court

Gameplay focuses on the player character (who can be male or female) interacting with several different women, each of whom has her own distinct personalities and preferences. The player can interact with women by talking to them and giving them gifts. Doing this rewards the player with "Hunie", an in-game currency that can be used to upgrade the player's stats. These stats allow the player to earn more points during dates, increasing their chance of success. The start of the game introduces the player to a fairy named Kyu, who from there on helps and assists the player in their dating quest.

In order to progress through the game, players must take the women on dates, where they will play a tile matching game where they must match sets of three or more identical tokens. The player must earn enough points to complete the date before they run out of moves. Each woman has a specific type of token that they like and dislike, and players will gain more points if they match the type of token that the woman prefers. The player can also use special items called "date gifts" during their dates which grant positive effects to help the player earn more points. After a successful date, the player is rewarded with a picture of the woman the date was with. Each successful date will also raise the game's difficulty, making subsequent dates require more points to complete. After 3 successful dates with a woman, the player will be able to take them on a date at night, and if that date is successful, the player can bring the woman to their bedroom for one final round of tile matching (and, if this is successful, have sexual intercourse with her). Unlike regular dates, the player has unlimited moves to complete the bedroom game, but the score meter constantly drains over time, so to win, matches must be made quickly until the meter is full. Throughout the game the player is guided by Kyu, a love fairy set on turning the player into a successful Lothario. She gives the player tips on how to interact with each woman and explains how the game's various mechanics work. She also becomes dateable after one bedroom game.

== Development ==
Ryan Koons, or "HuniePot", is the designer of the game and was formerly an employee of Insomniac Games. A Kickstarter crowdfunding campaign was launched with a minimum funding goal of $20,000. The Kickstarter ended successfully, raising $53,536 from 1,483 backers. Jonathan Wandag composed the soundtrack.

In February 2015, Koons released an update that gave HuniePop a new ending that unlocks options that make it easier for players to fill out a female character's profile and select date locations, among other options.

== Reception ==
HuniePop has received positive reception. Hardcore Gamer gave the game a rating of four out of five, writing "HuniePop is pornography—darn fine pornography at that—but it's also a shockingly good puzzle game. Occasionally those two identities feel at odds with each other, but for the most part they work in concert to show you a good time." Kotaku also gave a mostly positive review, praising it for being "strategically deep and challenging enough to kick a Candy Crush casual's ass" while also commenting that the game lacked a "strong finish". GameZone's Mike Splechta called the game "fun and engaging". Destructoid criticized the game's conversations as lacking in variety while stating that "In the end, I realize this is a game that, while riddled with issues, I liked a lot. A whole lot. In fact, with better writing and some more care given to the characters to flesh them out, it could be so much more."

Since HuniePop's release, there have been other games inspired by it, such as Front Wing's Purino Party.

Due to its strong sexual content and themes, Twitch blocked users from streaming gameplay footage of the title, regardless of which version of the game was being played.

== Series ==
Release timeline
2015	HuniePop
2016	HunieCam Studio
2017–2020
2021	HuniePop 2: Double Date

On April 4, 2016, Koons released a spin-off game called HunieCam Studio. HunieCam Studio is an adult-themed business simulation game, and features many of the characters who previously appeared in HuniePop. The game's art style also shifted to a more cartoon style, away from the anime-based art. Kotaku gave HunieCam Studio a mixed review, commenting that although the game's text was occasionally entertaining, they found the overall game experience to be "extremely boring".

A sequel, HuniePop 2: Double Date, was announced in January 2020. It is a continuation of HuniePop with the player controlling the same protagonist, and features returning characters from HuniePop and HunieCam Studio. The game features revised mechanics that focus on performing dates with two women at once. It was released for Microsoft Windows and OS X on February 8, 2021.

A fourth game in the series with the working title Project Codename HS was announced in February 2022. The announcement featured three returning characters from the original HuniePop.
