= Juden Chan =

Japanese manga series

- Cover of the first tankobon volume, released by Wani Books in Japan on June 24, 2006

ファイト一発!充電ちゃん!! (Faito ippatsu! Jūden-chan!!)
- Genre: Comedy, science fiction
- Manga
- Written by: Bow Ditama
- Published by: Wani Books
- Magazine: Comic Gum
- Original run: June 24, 2006 – October 26, 2013
- Volumes: 10
- Anime television series
- Directed by: Shinichiro Kimura
- Produced by: Hiromasa Minami; Takurō Hatakeyama; Nobuyuki Hirata; Motoo Kawabata; Yūsuke Kōno
- Written by: Yasunori Yamada
- Music by: Akifumi Tada
- Studio: Studio Hibari
- Licensed by: NA: Media Blasters
- Original network: AT-X
- English network: US: Toku
- Original run: June 25, 2009 – September 10, 2009
- Episodes: 12
- icon

Juden Chan (Japanese: ファイト一発!充電ちゃん!!, Hepburn: Faito ippatsu! Jūden-chan!!; lit. "Fight, One Shot! Charger Girls!") is a Japanese manga series by Bow Ditama, which is also adapted into an anime television series of the same name that aired on the AT-X network in Japan from June 25 to September 10, 2009. It features anthropomorphized characters representing aspects of charging electrical equipment. The series contains some explicit fan service, including omorashi (panty wetting). An edited version of the series was released on Crunchyroll under the title of Charger Girl Ju-den Chan.

== Plot ==
From a planet called "Life Core", which exists parallel to the normal human world, females known as "Jūden-chan" (charger girls) are patrolling the human world in search for individuals who feel depressed and unlucky. Their job is to charge these people up with the help of electricity in order to improve their mental states. While normally unseen by human eyes, one of these Jūden-chan, Plug Cryostat, accidentally meets a young man who is able to see her, because she was targeting his father (his sister in the anime). This series revolves around the various antics between the main characters and the quest for this Jūden-chan to improve herself.

== Characters ==
=== Charger Girls (Jūden-Chans) ===
The Charger Girls are from a parallel world whose jobs at the Neodym company are to monitor the levels of depression in people. They are generally not seen or heard by humans, and are equipped with technology that allows them to phase through objects too. The people they monitor are ranked A through F based on their depression levels, with A being near suicidal. When a target ranked C or higher is spotted, the Jūden-chan pulls a giant plug from a nearby electrical source and charges them with positive energy.

The series' main characters. Top row, from left to right: Bitch, Sweetie Millie, Bloody Silica. Middle row: Makko, Sokko, Takko, Chiiko, Rinko, Arresta Blanket, Sento Oumi, Plug Cryostat, Reika Galvani, Kuran Shunt, Pulse Trans, The Boss. Bottom Row: Rona Elmo, Iono Tomogana, Hakone Oumi.

Plug Cryostat (ぷらぐ・クライオスタット, Puragu Kuraiosutatto)
Voiced by: Kaori Fukuhara (Japanese); Brittany Lauda (English)
She is a "Jūden-chan": someone from a world that's parallel to our own, capable of recharging people who are depressed or unlucky. Although, she's not very good at it, and is a bit of an airhead. Because she has the ability to use phasing, she normally can't be seen by the average human. This is done so she can do her job without causing distraction. She loves to watch a hentai series called "Miracle Witch Milly". While other Jūden-chan focus on charging people and getting paid, Plug focuses on discovering the root of their problems so that they won't become depressed again, and eventually learns to create these chances herself.
Arresta Blanket (アレスタ・ブランケット, Arresta Buranketto)
Voiced by: Ayahi Takagaki (Japanese); Kira Buckland (English)
Plug's fellow Jūden-chan and rival, who, in the first 2 episodes, becomes her supervisor. She's rather serious when it comes to work, and is rather annoyed with how Plug does her job. In turn, Plug finds Arresta irritating for interfering with her work, and as a result, the two girls tend to fight a lot. She sometimes ends up crying, which Plug uses as blackmail material. Compared to Plug, Arresta is rather busty, which causes Plug to tease her.
She had feelings for Sento from the moment she saw him, but he is rather oblivious to this. Following their first meeting, Arresta seems to have garnered a fetish for being hit by a baseball bat.
Pulse Trans (パルス・トランス, Parusu Toransu)
Voiced by: Michie Tomizawa (Japanese); Amber Lee Connors (English)
The head of the organization that oversees the Jūden-chan and Rōden-chan. She has a fierce temper and constantly deducts from Plug's salary due to her incompetence. She does, however, have good judgment in her commands.
Kuran Shunt (クラン・シャント, Kuran Shanto)
Voiced by: Ai Shimizu (Japanese); Rose Dyson (English)
A Rōden-chan, aka Leakage Girl, who monitors activities such as electrical disturbances, and apprehends criminals suspected of harboring electricity for profit. They have more advanced equipment than the Jūden-chan, as well as specialized technology meant for apprehending criminals.
Reika Galvini (レーカ・ガルヴァーニ, Rēka Garuvāni)
Voiced by: Ayako Kawasumi (Japanese); Hazel Summer (English)
Another Rōden-chan, who often partners with Kuran. Both of them seem to take a liking to Sento after their first encounter with him.
Rinko (りん子), Maako (まぁ子), Taako (たぁ子), Chiiko (ちぃ子) and Sokko (そっ子)
A fellow Jūden-chan from Plug's department, who's pretty similar to her in terms of personality, but still occasionally berates her when her pay gets cut.
Weber (ウェーバ, Wēba; derived from the SI unit of magnetic flux Weber)
A Jūden-chan who heads up the Samarium Cobalt company that Plug becomes a part of dedicated to charging targets in Africa. She's also in a lesbian relationship with another Jūden-chan, Tesla.
Tesla (テスラ, Tesura; derived from the SI unit of magnetic flux density Tesla)
Another member of the Samarium Cobalt company, and Waver's lover.
Ohm (オーム, Ōmu; derived from the SI unit of electrical resistance Ohm)
Another member of the Samarium Cobalt company, who has freckles on her cheeks.
Farad (ファラド, Farado; derived from the SI unit of capacitance Farad)
Another member of the Samarium Cobalt company, who has messy hair and is generally sleepy.

=== Humans ===
Sento Oumi (近江 閃登, Ōmi Sento)
Voiced by: Hiroki Takahashi (Japanese); Daniel J. Edwards (English)
A young man who is the only human capable of seeing both Plug and Arresta. He works at a family restaurant but has a rather short temper, and tends to frequently hit Plug (and at times Arresta as well) with a baseball bat or whatever is within reach; this has become a running gag in the series. He occasionally helps Plug and Arresta with their work, teaching Plug that the best way to find an opportunity to charge is to make one yourself. He lives with his younger sister, and he's capable of absorbing the counter-current of Kenta Kajiwara, the Z-class boy.
Hakone Oumi (近江 はこね, Ōmi Hakone)
Voiced by: Ui Miyazaki (Japanese); Cheryl Li (English)
Sento's younger sister. She lives with her older brother and wants to do household chores so that she can feel useful, but Sento told her not to because he feels responsible for her. She cares for her brother and is frustrated that she is not allowed to help him, making her depressed and unhappy (and a prime target for Plug). She starts the series a third year junior high student, before moving on to her first year in high school.
Iono Tomonaga (朝永 依緒乃, Tomonaga Iono)
Voiced by: Sayuri Yahagi (Japanese); Felecia Angelle (English)
Pink hair, put into twin tails. Hakone's childhood friend. She has a crush on Sento, whom she calls "Sen-nii", and is struggling to confess to him, but Sento seems to be unaware of it and only thinks of her as a little sister, much to her frustration. Later on in the manga, she gains the ability to see and touch Jūden-chan. She starts the series as a second year high school student, and later enters her third year.
Kenta Kajiwara
A young boy who became worried about the prospect of bullies at school, due to the effects of Rona Elmo. He is called a Z rank since the counter-current he gives off to Jūden-chan trying to charge him is too powerful. Nonetheless, Plug became determined to save him, even at the risk of burning her arms off.
Boss (店長, Tenchou)
Voiced by: Kotono Mitsuishi (Japanese); Michele Knotz (English)
Sento's well-endowed boss at a family diner he works at. She appears to have a lolita complex and takes interest in young girls, particularly Hakone.
Eiji Oumi (近江 栄司, Ōmi Eiji)
Sento's and Hakone's father. While absent in the anime, he appears in the first chapter of the manga in place of Hakone. The berating he received from Sento for being a poor father caused him to reach a level higher than A, which would cause his heart to fail if left alone. With Plug's help, he is saved.

=== Other characters ===
Rona Elmo (ロナ・エルモ, Rona Erumo)
Voiced by: Aya Hirano (Japanese); Daisy Guevara (English)
A Hōden-chan (discharger girl) that saps away positive energy from people. She hates being alone, and since no one in the human world can see her, she treats everyone like toys. Despite her small appearance, she is very powerful, being able to defeat Rōden-chan at the snap of her finger.
Ruiji Kido (木戸 類慈, Kido Ruiji)
The founder and president of the Neodym company.
Sweety Milly (スイーティー・ミリィ, Suīteī Mirii)
Voiced by: Tae Okajima (Japanese); Yara Naika (English)
A magical girl from a rather perverted television show called "Miracle Witch Milly" that seems to be aired at whatever time of day is convenient. Partnered with her insulting sidekick Bitch (Voiced by: Tomoko Kaneda (Japanese); Billy Bob Thompson (English)), she goes against her arch rival, Bloody Selica (Voiced by: Asami Imai (Japanese); Michaela A. Laws (English)), generally having her clothes removed in the process. In the end though, she falls in love with Selica and they become lovers instead of rivals.
Seru Acturator (セル アクチュレータ, Seru Akuchurēta)
An original character who appears in the PSP game.

== Terminology ==
Jūden-chan (充電ちゃん)
Charger girls. Their job is to monitor depression levels in people. They are generally unseen by normal people, and can adjust their stealth levels to avoid being touched as well. People they monitor are ranked A - F depending on how depressed they are, F being the lowest and A being the highest, possibly leading to suicide. When a C rank or higher target is found, a Jūden-chan pulls out a giant plug from a nearby electrical source, and charge them with electricity to make them more energetic. How they go about their energetic way depends on what they are thinking of when they are charged.

Rōden-chan (漏電ちゃん)
Leakage girls. Their job is to investigate cases in which electricity is stolen and illegally sold on the black market. They have more advanced equipment than the Jūden-chan, including several gadgets used for apprehending suspects.

Hōden-chan (放電ちゃん)
Discharger girls. These girls do the exact opposite of Jūden-chan, and are able to steal a person's energy and increase their depression levels greatly in an instant. They can use the energy they steal for profit.

== Media ==
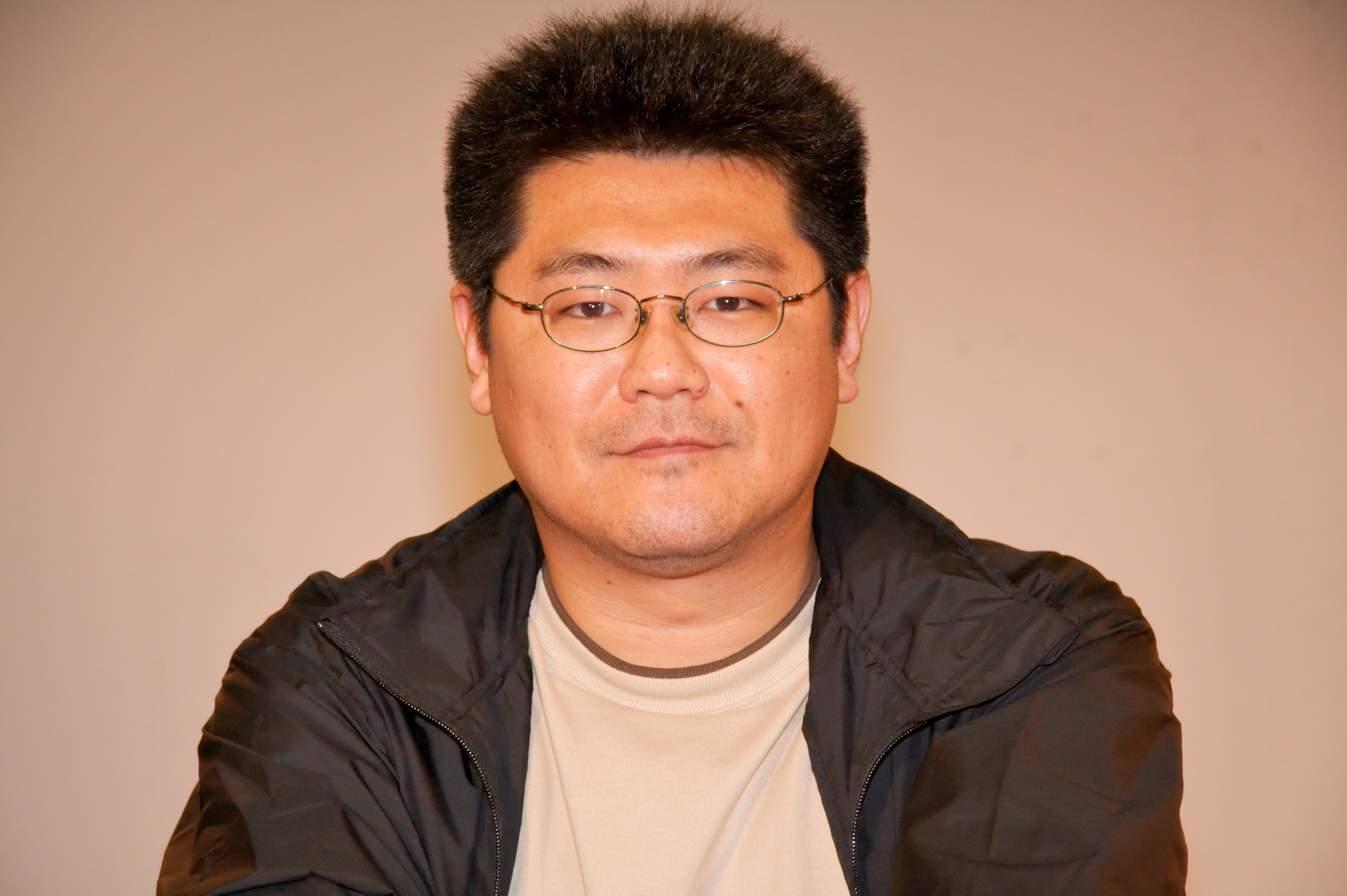
A photograph of Bow Ditama, the manga's author

=== Manga ===
The manga began serialization in Comic Gum magazine from June 24, 2006. Ten tankōbon volumes were released as for October 26, 2013.

No.	Japanese release date	Japanese ISBN
1	June 24, 2006	4-8470-3552-6
2	March 24, 2007	978-4-8470-3593-7
3	September 25, 2007	978-4-8470-3616-3
4	June 25, 2008	978-4-8470-3640-8
5	January 23, 2009	978-4-8470-3668-2
6	September 19, 2009	978-4-8470-3700-9
7	October 25, 2010	978-4-8470-3753-5
8	September 24, 2011	978-4-8470-3789-4
9	July 25, 2012	978-4-8470-3821-1
10	January 28, 2014	978-4-8470-3906-5

=== Anime ===
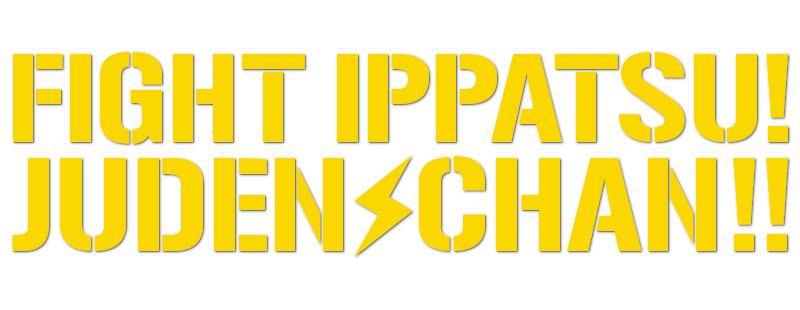
The logo used for the anime

The anime series, produced by Studio Hibari, aired on the cable/satellite channel AT-X between June 25, 2009, and September 10, 2009. The opening theme is "Charge!" by Kaori Fukuhara and Ayahi Takagaki while the ending theme is "Please, Sweet Heart" (お願いSweet heart, Onegai Sweet Heart) by Fukuhara. Crunchyroll worked with avex entertainment on an edited version which censors some of the nudity and urination for UHF broadcast. This version was streamed on Crunchyroll under the title Charger Girl Ju-den Chan.

Media Blasters have licensed the series in North America and released it on DVD, in Japanese language with English subtitles, June 25, 2013. The series premiered on Toku in the United States on December 31, 2015. This show was also dubbed into Spanish, and distributed on the Ultra Macho network.

==== Episode list ====
No.	Title	Original release date
1	"Plug in!" Transliteration: "Puragu in!" (Japanese: ぷらぐ・いん!)	June 25, 2009
While looking for some targets to charge, a charger girl named Plug encounters Sento, who can actually see her and hit her. Plug notices his sister, Hakone, is showing a lot of depression, but Sento refuses to let her stick a giant plug in his little sister's back. Plug discovers that the cause of Hakone's depression is that her brother never lets her do anything to help him, but Sento refuses to listen to her. Hakone considers jumping off of a building, but thanks to the joint efforts of Plug and Sento, she is saved and charged, and is confident enough to convey her feelings to Sento.
2	"Timing!"; Transliteration: "Taimingu!" (Japanese: たいみんぐ!)	July 2, 2009
While trying to charge up some targets, Plug finds herself beaten to the punch by her colleague, Arresta. They then start to notice a lot of repeaters, people who have already been charged but have become depressed again. Plug goes to Sento for some advice, who says that simply charging them won't fix the cause of their problems. Worried about a person taking his exams, Plug follows him to find the cause, knowing just charging him would continue the cycle, or get him to do something regrettable. Arresta shows up to charge him, but Plug holds her back until the right moment to charge him, so he becomes energetic on the right path. On her way home, Arresta crosses paths with Sento and is hit by his bat.
3	"Lock-On!"; Transliteration: "Rokku On!" (Japanese: ろっく・おん！)	July 9, 2009
Arresta gets put in charge of taking care of Plug, something she greatly objects to. While finding Plug at Sento's house, she is hit by Sento once again, and soon becomes aware of his ability to see and touch her. Wondering why Plug hasn't reported such a matter to the office, Arresta is then insulted when Sento implies her job is something 'an idiot can do'. Arresta challenges Sento to a match where they are to lock-on to the most C targets, with Arresta reporting Sento to the office should she win. Sento relies on his senses as opposed to the gadgets the charger girls use and wins the bet. As such, Arresta keeps her word, but can't shake the somewhat arousing feeling Sento's bat gives her.
4	"Iono Crisis!"; Transliteration: "Iono, kuraishisu!" (Japanese: 依緒乃、クライシス)	July 16, 2009
Sento and Hakone's childhood friend, Iono, has a crush on Sento, but can't find the right moment to confess. Iono gets a present to give to him, but one night her daydreaming causes her to forget locking up the student council room, causing the school's budget, along with her present, to be stolen when the school is broken into. When she turns to Sento for comfort, he tells her that she is like a little sister to her, which breaks her heart. Realising Sento is too oblivious to realize what he did wrong, Plug attempts to find the person who vandalized the school. Noticing this, Sento offers to help her search. Arresta, trying to ignore such daft heroism, ends up accidentally charging the culprit, who turns himself in and returns the stolen goods. As Iono is about to give up on Sento, Plug fakes a text from Hakone about how Sento tried to help, in order to provide an opportunity to charge her. Iono makes her confession, and while Sento is still too thick to get it, he accepts the present and puts it on his guitar case.
5	"Happening!"; Transliteration: "Hapuningu!" (Japanese: はぷにんぐ!)	July 23, 2009
Sento, his boss, Hakone and Iono go to the beach, while Plug and Arresta, also on their day off, decide to go too. While enjoying the sun, Plug notices a writer on a slump behaving strangely, despite being ranked E. Despite Arresta's suggestion not to bother during break time, Plug investigates, and when the writer passes by a strange girl in a hat, she gets angry at her parents and her warning rank rises to a C. She soon ends up on a raft out at sea, increasing in rank, but Plug isn't able to find any power sources out at sea. She calls Arresta for help, and when Sento hears about it, he takes his boss's car and drives it off the edge, so that the power can reach the writer, who becomes energetic and starts writing again. Arresta notices that despite the number of people charged Plug has is low, there are no repeaters among her.
6	"Counter-Current!"; Transliteration: "Gyakuryū" (Japanese: 逆流)	July 30, 2009
A young boy named Kenta has become so depressed, that the counter-current from those that try to charge him causes a severe electric shock. He is given a Z rank and is deemed out of bounds for charging, but Plug can't help but feel like she should do something. Arresta is given a stronger suit, but it is only to be used for gathering data. Still determined, Plug blackmails her in order to get the suit off of her. Arresta notices the suit is actually defective, but is unable to stop Plug. Realizing Kenta's problem, Plug starts charging and immediately feels the counter-current. Despite the excruciating pain, Plug bears it until Kenta is completely charged. Thankfully a medical team arrives on the scene in time and despite her injuries, she is relieved to hear that Kenta is doing fine.
7	"Maid in Arresta"; Transliteration: "Meido in Aresuta!" (Japanese: めいど・いん・アレスタ！)	August 6, 2009
Arresta is scolded by head supervisor Pulse for allowing Plug to get injured. Plug herself is fine, but her arms are severely damaged, so Arresta has to look after her area while she recovers. In order to get Plug to delete embarrassing footage of her crying, Arresta agrees to be her maid, wearing an outfit made of anti-stealth materials, allowing her to be seen in the real world. First, Plug asks her to buy some manga for her, but Arresta finds herself at the front of a line of otakus taken photos of her underwear. She then gets asked ridiculous food requests, and reserving expensive tickets, before being asked to wash her down. While fetching some water, Arresta is observed by some mysterious forces. Plug is later visited by her colleagues from her division, and Arresta notices the similarities they share with Plug. However, she flips when she learns people have already seen her embarrassing footage.
8	"Craziness and Kindness"; Transliteration: "Mucha to Yasashisa" (Japanese: 無茶と優しさ)	August 13, 2009
Plug gets scolded for trying to get back to work before her arms had fully healed, but her chief allows her to lock onto targets while Arresta charges them. She gets a bit depressed when Sento isn't at home, but he soon arrives and notices her injuries, deciding to give her a massage to help. Just then, Sento notices a boy that looks down and convinces Plug to charge him herself. They successfully charge him, but accidentally rip the backside of Plug's suit off. Meanwhile, Chief Pulse seems to have been made aware of Plug and Arresta's connection to Sento.
9	"Audit Division, Special Cases Section - Leakage Girls"; Transliteration: "Kansa-shitsu Tokumu-bu Rōden-chan!" (Japanese: 監査室特務部・漏電ちゃん!)	August 20, 2009
Plug and Arresta get called to Chief Pulse's office where they are introduced to the Rōden-chan (leakage girls), Reka Galvini and Kuran Shunt, who monitor electrical leakage, and monitor those who are accused of smuggling electricity. The Rōden-chan also reveal they are aware of Sento and accompany Plug and Arresta on their next run. Plug and Arresta lose them, but they capture Plug and discover Arresta talking to Sento. They manage to get away but are told to come to a location when they reveal they have Plug. Arresta and Sento manage to subdue Kuran, and Plug breaks free from her captivity. After hearing Sento praising her in front of Reka, she helps to subdue her as well. However, it turns out to be a misunderstanding, and a harmless test proves them innocent.
10	"Present!?"; Transliteration: "Purezento!?" (Japanese: ぷれぜんと!?)	August 27, 2009
As everyone gets ready for Christmas, the Jūden-chan have their work cut out for them. Reka and Kuran visit Sento and warn him about Hōden-chan (discharger girls), who steal people's positive energy. As Plug wonders about if she should get Sento a present, Arresta already has one in mind. One of the Hōden-chan, Rona Elmo, targets two people who pick a flower she liked. After apprehending an electricity thief, Reka and Kuran eventually find Rona, but are badly defeated. Sento discovers them and is left unconscious. Incidentally, the entertainment news reporter on TV who identified herself as "Hirano", is the voice actress for Rona as well.
11	"Watch out! Discharger Girl!"; Transliteration: "Yō-keikai! Hōden-chan!" (Japanese: 要警戒! 放電ちゃん!)	September 3, 2009
Hakone notices something weird about Sento. Meanwhile, Rona, who is annoyed that there aren't any other people who can see her, goes on a discharging spree, alerting the Jūden-chan. The whole department is sent to help the affected, but they find they have to charge each target ten times to get them to drop. Plug's methods, however, are still effective, so the others decide to take her approach to charging with great success. Plug decides to visit Sento and is shocked to find he has a B rank and is no longer able to see or touch her. Before Plug can charge him, she is spotted by Rona, who breaks her equipment and reveals she discharged Sento by accident. She saw humans as toys, but felt lonely since no one could see her in this world. She is soon chased off by the Rōden-chan. Arresta arrives and is devastated by Sento's condition. Plug leaves him in her care while she resumes her duty.
12	"Fight! One Shot!"; Transliteration: "Faito! Ippatsu!" (Japanese: ふぁいと! いっぱつ!)	September 10, 2009
Arresta tries her best to recharge Sento, but to no avail. Plug meanwhile is shocked to find Kenta has returned to a B rank. Hakone and Iono arrive and manage to get Sento out of their funk on their own. Plug tries to charge Kenta, but despite the excruciating pain, she does not succeed, and he starts to walk into the river. Arresta uses a spark trail to lead Sento to where Plug is, and he manages to save Kenta. He tells him about the Jūden-chan, lifting his spirits. Plug's unit arrives, and combines their plugs to form a giant plug to charge Kenta. Sento absorbs some of the excess electricity and regains his ability to see Jūden-chan, letting Plug and Arresta completely charge Kenta. Rona tries to attack them, but has some sense knocked into her by Sento. Everyone then spends Christmas Day together.

==== Bonus episodes ====
Extra short episodes are featured in the DVD releases of the series, featuring more explicit content than the broadcast show.

#	Episode title	Original air date
Bonus–1	"Charging in an Open Bath" (Japanese: 露天風呂で充電〜)	December 18, 2009
While the Jūden-chan relax at an onsen, Plug gets annoyed with people comparing her breasts to Arresta's, causing her to turn temporarily crazy and start molesting all the other girls.
Bonus–2	"Sweetie Arresta Appears" (Japanese: スィーティ・アレスタ登場)	February 25, 2010
In a cosplay show for the male customers, Arresta dresses up as Milly and ends up getting attacked by an octopus controlled by Plug. However, the controls for the robotic octopus short out, and the octopus attacks Plug, as well as the other cosplayers.
Bonus–3	"Stay up Late in the Night at the Hot Springs Part I" (Japanese: 『温泉の夜は更けて!!』PART I)	TBA
After being charged by a new refresher, Iono and Hakone come onto Sento.
Bonus–4	"Stay up Late in the Night at the Hot Springs Part II" (Japanese: 『温泉の夜は更けて!!』PART II)	TBA
Plug, Arresta and Rona catch Reika and Kuran eloping in the springs. However, it turns out to be a holographic projection and the three peepers are punished by the real Rōden-chan.
Bonus–5	"Jūden Fight!" (Japanese: 充電ファイト!)	TBA
Plug and Arresta duke it out in a nude fight. However, Arresta gets the upper hand when she exploits Plug's weakness, her antennaes, and temporarily becomes a sadist.
Bonus–6	"Party of the Night" (Japanese: 宴の夜)	TBA
As the Jūden-chan celebrate their final night at the hot springs, someone adds an anti-stealth potion that lets them be seen by normal humans.

=== Video game ===
A visual novel developed by Russell entitled Fight Ippatsu! Jūden-chan!! CC (ファイト一発！充電ちゃん!! CC) was released for the PlayStation Portable on May 27, 2010, in Japan.
