= Holy Knight =

Japanese manga

ホーリーナイト (Hōrī Naito)
- Manga
- Written by: Maya Miyazaki
- Published by: GOT Corporation
- Imprint: MeDu Comics
- Magazine: Canopri Comic
- Original run: December 28, 2010 – present
- Volumes: 4
- Light novel
- Written by: Kazuhiro Kawashima
- Illustrated by: Maya Miyazaki
- Published by: Shueisha
- Imprint: Super Dash Bunko
- Published: July 22, 2011
- Volumes: 1
- Original video animation
- Directed by: Jirō Fujimoto (#1); Hiroyuki Shimazu (#2)
- Produced by: Daisuke Kimura; Kazuteru Kaneko; Yasumasa Sekiya
- Written by: Fujimi no Mai
- Music by: VI-M
- Studio: Lilix
- Licensed by: AUS: Mandala Films; NA: Media Blasters
- Released: March 21, 2012 – May 25, 2012
- Runtime: 27–30 minutes (each)
- Episodes: 2

Holy Knight (Japanese: ホーリーナイト, Hepburn: Hōrī Naito) is a Japanese manga by Maya Miyazaki. It was adapted into an OVA.

== Plot ==
Mizumura Shinta doesn't know what to make of the situation when the sexiest girl in school, Kishimoto Lilith, starts trying to seduce him and things get extremely physical. Shinta isn't rich or the popular guy in school, so it doesn't make sense why Lilith would be so interested in him. But Lilith is in fact a vampire, a Moroi, a secret she will kill to keep hidden, and she needs Shinta for a special purpose. As the relationship between Shinta and Lilith grows, it gets harder for her to keep the secret hidden. When violent unexpected attacks begin, those close to him, like his semi-romantic childhood friend Makimura Chizuru, are involuntarily thrown into the chaos, deep dark secrets get revealed...including a secret about Shinta himself he's not even aware of but everyone else seems to know.

== OVA Cast ==
Character	Japanese	English
Shinta Mizumara	Hiro Shimono	Daman Mills
Lilith Kishimoto	Maaya Uchida	Amber Lee Connors
Chizuru Makimura	Yuiko Tatsumi	Melanie Ehrlich
Cammot	Ayana Taketatsu	Brittany Lauda
Mayall	Jouji Nakata	Daren Donofrio
Plum	Kenichi Suzumura	Devon Talbott
Akira Sakamoto	Nozomi Yamamoto	Michele Knotz
Cliff	Shinichiro Miki	Michael A. Zekas
Camilla	Yukari Kokubun	Miranda Gauvin
Shigeyuki Yanagida	Kentarou Tone	Meli Grant
Lilith's Father	Nobuyuki Hiyama	Mike Pollock
Daisuke Kimura	Ryota Takeuchi	Greg Nugent
Lilith's Mother	Tomo Sakurai	Michele Knotz
