= Media Blasters =

American entertainment company

- Type: Private
- Industry: Entertainment
- Predecessor: Software Sculptors
- Founded: 1997; 29 years ago
- Founder: John Sirabella
- Headquarters: New York City, New York, United States
- Area served: United States, Canada
- Key people: John Sirabella (CEO)
- Products: Anime; adult anime; manga; Asian films; horror films; monster films; concert films; independent films; exploitation films
- Number of employees: 5 or 6 (2012)
- Website: www.media-blasters.com

Media Blasters, sometimes abbreviated as MB, is an American entertainment company that was founded by John Sirabella in 1997 and is based in New York City. It is in the business of licensing, translating, and releasing to the North American market manga and anime compilations, Asian films and television series, adult anime, monster movies, concert films, independent films, horror films, and exploitation films. Over its history, the company has licensed several popular titles, such as Rurouni Kenshin, Berserk, Bakuman, Shamanic Princess, Weiß Kreuz, Jubei-chan: The Ninja Girl, Chu-Bra!!, Grenadier, Holy Knight, Elf Princess Rane, Voogie's Angel, Iron Virgin Jun, Ultimate Girls, and Blade of the Immortal.

== History ==
=== Founding and growth ===
Before Media Blasters was founded, John Sirabella had previously founded Software Sculptors in 1992. After it was purchased by Central Park Media, Sirabella decided to leave and found Media Blasters in 1997 in New York City, New York. The company is divided into several divisions that target different aspects of the video market. They license titles for release and are involved in the production, localizing, and distribution. The Anime Works division was created in 1997, and focuses on localization and distribution of anime titles, but has also licensed non-anime works such as Invader Zim. The adult label Kitty Media was also started in 1997 and features explicit hentai works. Created in 1998, Tokyo Shock is Media Blaster's Asian cinema division, which is responsible for American localization of works such as Zatoichi: The Blind Swordsman of the Zatoichi franchise. Another division, Shriek Show, was founded in 2001 to focus on re-mastering horror titles for DVD release. In 2004, Media Blasters began publishing manga. The company first published shōnen manga titles for older readers, and later on it increased its yaoi manga line. At the height of its success, they released around five titles a month and had about 50 employees, but as the market decreased, so did the company.

=== Financial problems ===
In January 2012, John Sirabella announced that the company would be laying off approximately 10 employees, reducing its workforce by about 60 percent. He stated that this will not affect their production rates. In May 2012, it was reported that the New York State Department of State listed them as an inactive company due to not filing their taxes properly. The company later stated on Facebook that they had filed extensions for 2009, 2010, and 2011, but without their notice the Secretary of State took action. They also said that, at the time of posting, they had completed their filings properly and that they will continue to release titles. In March 2013, the company released a statement saying that, because a major back accident occurred in their warehouse, they were unable to travel to Japan to acquire licenses. This resulted in business associates of the company going around Japan showing a tax paper stating they were out of business, which ended up resulting in the company losing a majority of their titles, most notably Rurouni Kenshin, Berserk, and Bakuman. In January 2015, the company signed a deal with MB VoiceWorks to help produce English dubs for its anime titles in-house. Despite the closure of MB VoiceWorks in May 2016, Media Blasters would still continue to produce its English dubs in-house and that MB VoiceWorks co-founder Brittany Lauda would continue to lead the dubbing department and direct dubs for the company.

=== Recovery ===
In August 2020, the company created a new Twitter account to promote their new releases. The company also teased that many new releases would be coming in the future. In November 2020, the company announced that they will stop using their DVD-on-demand system. In January 2021, the company introduced a new opening animation.

== Distribution ==
Their titles are streamed on Crunchyroll, Tubi, Amazon Prime Video, RetroCrush, and Midnight Pulp. Some of their titles were available on Hulu, but they have been removed.

On December 31, 2015, the television network Toku was launched, replacing the Funimation Channel. It aired many anime and live action titles from the Media Blasters catalog, such as Juden Chan, Ladies versus Butlers!, and Rio: Rainbow Gate! They were the main anime provider for the network. Media Blasters later revealed Blu-ray releases of retro ecchi comedies such as Jungle De Ikou! in 2020. Eiken and Grenadier was added on Tubi.

== Divisions ==
=== Anime Works ===
Anime Works is the division used for the bulk of the company's anime titles. Some of the series released under this imprint include Magic Knight Rayearth, Rurouni Kenshin, The King of Braves GaoGaiGar, Berserk, and Blade of the Immortal. The imprint also produced two original series with Yasuomi Umetsu, those being Kite Liberator and Mezzo Forte.

=== Kitty Media ===
Kitty Media specializes in adult anime (hentai) and pornographic films. The division also specializes in films and anime series that contain scenes of rape and graphic sexuality. Its first release, and the first release by Media Blasters as a whole, was Rei-Lan: Orchid Emblem. Media Blasters also publishes both hentai and yaoi manga under this imprint. It has also released several titles formerly released by Central Park Media's Anime 18 imprint.

In 2011, they entered a licensing partnership with Fakku to stream select titles, starting with Immoral Sisters. In 2017, they were acquired by Fakku for digital distribution, while physical distribution was maintained by Media Blasters. In late 2020 however, CEO of Fakku Jacob Grady announced in the official forums of Fakku that they have indefinitely deprioritized video streaming of Kitty Media adult anime because of distribution and copyright issues, causing some titles to be removed from the site. As of January 2023, Kitty Media is no longer part of Fakku after its nearly six year, unsuccessful venture in legal adult anime video streaming, giving Media Blasters back full control of the adult label.

=== Tokyo Shock ===
The Tokyo Shock division covers live action movies and television series from Japan and other Asian markets, such as several notable films from Toho Co. Ltd and Shaw Brothers (HK) Ltd.

=== Shriek Show ===
The Shriek Show division handled distribution of obscure horror and exploitation films. This division and the Fresh Meat line were discontinued in 2013.

==== Fresh Meat ====
The Fresh Meat line was a part of the Shriek Show division that handled horror films from new directors.

=== Fever Dreams ===
The Fever Dreams division specializes in original films. The company focused heavily on this division in 2013.

=== Guilty Pleasures ===
The Guilty Pleasures division specialized in releasing B-tier cult-classic films. This division was discontinued in 2013, but the company decided to start re-releasing some of its titles in 2021.
