= List of Arifureta episodes =

Arifureta is an anime television series based on the light novel series of the same title written by Ryo Shirakome and illustrated by Takayaki. The anime adaptation was announced on December 3, 2017, and was initially intended to premiere in April 2018, but on January 15, 2018, its release was pushed back due to "various circumstances". Originally, the series would have been directed by Jun Kamiya and written by Kazuyuki Fudeyasu, with animation by studio White Fox and character designs by Atsuo Tobe, who also would have served as chief animation director. However, following the postponement, it was announced on April 29, 2018, that Kinji Yoshimoto would be taking over as director and studio Asread would be joining White Fox as animators. Additionally, Chika Kojima took over from Atsuo Tobe as character designer to adapt Takayaki's original designs, and Kazuyuki Fudeyasu left his position as scriptwriter, being replaced by Shōichi Satō and Kinji Yoshimoto. Ryō Takahashi composed the series' music. The opening theme song is "Flare", performed by Void_Chords feat. LIO, while the ending theme song is "Hajime no Uta" (ハジメノウタ; "First Song") by DracoVirgo.The series aired from July 8 to October 7, 2019, on AT-X and other networks, and ran for 13 episodes. Two original video animations (OVA) was released with the second and third home video sets on December 25, 2019, and February 26, 2020. Funimation licensed the series for an English simulcast and simuldub, which following Sony's acquisition of the namesake platform, the series was moved to Crunchyroll.

After the finale of the first season, it was announced that the series would receive a second season. Akira Iwanaga replaced Kinji Yoshimoto as director, and Studio Mother replaced White Fox as the secondary studio. The rest of the staff and cast returned to reprise their roles. The second season aired from January 13 to April 7, 2022. and is available to watch on iQiyi. The opening theme song is "Daylight" by MindaRyn, while the ending theme is "Gedō Sanka" (外道讃歌) by FantasticYouth. A new OVA was released on September 25, 2022, titled "The Miraculous Meeting and the Phantasmagorical Adventure" (幻の冒険と奇跡の邂逅, Maboroshi no Bōken to Kiseki no Kaigō).

On September 10, 2022, it was announced that the series would receive a third season. Asread is animating the season, with Akira Iwanaga, Shoichi Sato, and Chika Kojima returning as director, scriptwriter, and character designer, respectively. The third season aired from October 14, 2024, to February 17, 2025. The opening theme song is "Unending Wish" by Void_Chords feat. MindaRyn.

== Series overview ==
Season	Episodes	Originally released	
Season	Episodes	First released	Last released
1	13	July 8, 2019	October 7, 2019
2	13	January 13, 2022	March 31, 2022
3	16	October 14, 2024	February 17, 2025

== Episodes ==
=== Season 1 (2019) ===
No. overall	No. in season	Title	Directed by	Storyboarded by	Original release date	Ref.
1	1	"The Monster of the Abyss"; Transliteration: "Naraku no Soko no Bakemono" (Japanese: 奈落の底の化け物)	Masayuki Iimura	Kinji Yoshimoto	July 8, 2019	
When Japanese students who have been transported to another world enter a dungeon, a Behemoth confronts them. After trying to save student Kaori, student Hajime Nagumo is deliberately knocked into the abyss of the Orcus Labyrinth by a classmate. The bottom of the abyss is filled with monsters stronger than Hajime has ever seen. A bear monstrosity severs his arm and eats it. Hajime escapes by transmuting his way deep into the ground and finds a Divinity Stone that creates a constantly refilling pool of Ambrosia healing fluid, allowing him to survive the severing of his arm. Hajime has no warrior skills, his only real skill being Transmute, which allows him to manipulate matter. Hajime eventually starts to break due to intense hunger, and begins to hunt the strong wolves by using traps. Upon eating one, the cells of the monster change his DNA, and only the constant healing from the Ambrosia saves him. His body transforms, becoming stronger due to the constant tearing apart of his muscles from the symbiosis of his and the monsters' DNA and the healing of the Ambrosia. After his transformation, he hunts further monsters, eating them to raise his levels and gain their physical and magical abilities. He even uses his Transmutation skill to create his first revolver: Donner. Finally, he hunts and eats the bear monstrosity before looking for a way deeper into the abyss.
2	2	"Pandora's Box"; Transliteration: "Pandora no Hako" (Japanese: パンドラの箱)	Taiji Kawanishi	Naoki Ōdaira	July 15, 2019	
The King is told of Hajime’s death and, unwilling to admit to a Hero’s death, forbids any mention of the incident. Shizuku, Kaori’s friend, reveals through flashbacks that the Pope summoned their high school class and their teacher to this world to act as Heroes in Humanity’s war against demons and monsters. She notices her classmate, Hiyama, acting strangely but does not hear him reassuring himself that no one saw him attack Hajime. Hajime eventually reaches a giant stone door and defeats the guardians, retrieving keys from their corpses. Kaori is determined not to give up on finding Hajime. Behind the doors, Hajime finds a young girl imprisoned in a crystal, but decides to leave her, believing she must be a monster imprisoned for a reason. She admits she is an immortal vampire princess, but insists she was betrayed by an uncle who wanted her position; unable to kill her, he sealed her away. Feeling sympathy from having been betrayed himself, Hajime frees her. Deciding to abandon her old name, she asks Hajime for a new one, so he names her Yue for the moon, as her golden hair reminds him of moonlight.
3	3	"The Golden Vampire Princess"; Transliteration: "Ōgon no Kyūketsuki" (Japanese: 黄金の吸血姫)	Hiroyuki Tsuchiya	Jun Takahashi	July 22, 2019	
Hajime and Yue are attacked by a giant scorpion monster. Yue feeds on Hajime’s blood, recovering her magic, and they kill the scorpion. While eating the flesh, Hajime tells Yue that all vampires were exterminated 300 years ago, making her the last vampire. Yue explains that the labyrinths were built by Mavericks, powerful magic users who attempted and failed to defeat God, so they each constructed a labyrinth as sanctuaries against God's revenge and may still be alive on the deepest floors. Hajime transmutes the scorpion’s shell to create a railgun which he names Schlagen. Hajime tells Yue how he was betrayed, but no longer cares about his classmates or even revenge; he just wants enough power to return to Japan, and as Yue no longer has a home he asks her to go with him. Hajime’s classmates decide to enter the labyrinth again. Hajime and Yue enter a floor where all monsters are infected and psychically controlled by a plant-like monster. Yue is infected; however, one of the monsters Hajime previously ate makes him immune to the infection, allowing him to kill the monster. Later, Yue strips naked to drink Hajime’s blood and seduces him. Several days later they reach the bottom floor and prepare to face the final boss monster.
4	4	"Guardian of the Depths"; Transliteration: "Saiō no Gādian" (Japanese: 最奥のガーディアン)	Naoki Ōdaira	Naoki Ōdaira	July 29, 2019	
Hajime and Yue confront the final boss, a giant hydra-like monster with six different colored heads, each capable of a different type of magic and one of which (the white one) can heal the others. Yue is distracted by the fear-inducing hypnosis of one of the heads and almost eaten, but Hajime snaps her out of it with a kiss. Hajime succeeds in using Schlagen to destroy three heads, including the healing head, and Yue destroys the remaining three with lightning. Before they can relax a surprise seventh head emerges. Hajime is injured protecting Yue and Schlagen is destroyed. Yue drags the unconscious Hajime to safety and tries to attack with his pistol, but is injured. Even unconscious, Hajime hears Yue crying, regains consciousness and somehow increases his speed such that he can dodge all attacks. He explodes grenades all around the room, dropping the roof on the head and allowing Yue to kill it for good with lightning. As the final door opens, Hajime passes out from exhaustion. Meanwhile, Aiko Hatayama, Hajime’s teacher who was also summoned as a Hero, argues with the Pope, who is insisting that the summoned students re-enter the labyrinth. The Pope agrees to only send students that volunteer as long as Aiko continues using her fertility magic to support the kingdom's struggling agriculture.
5	5	"The Maverick's Lair"; Transliteration: "Hangyakusha no Sumika" (Japanese: 反逆者の住処)	Hiroyuki Tsuchiya	Naoyuki Kuzuya	August 5, 2019	
Hajime awakens in bed with Yue, having lost his right eye, and learns they are in the Maverick's home. After exploring the mansion, they discover the skeleton of the Maverick on the topmost floor before a magic circle. Hajime has his memories forcibly examined by a spell which activates a recording the Maverick left behind. The Maverick introduces himself as Oscar Orcus and for defeating his labyrinth deems Hajime worthy to know the truth of the Maverick/God war. Hajime’s classmates enter the labyrinth and defeat the Behemoth they believe killed Hajime. Oscar grants Hajime his power and memories before disappearing. Hajime realises the Mavericks were actually Liberators and reveals he has inherited Oscar's Ancient Creation Magic, allowing him to add magical properties to transmuted objects to create Artefacts. They formally bury Oscar, and Hajime takes his ring which controls a portal to the surface. Hajime decides to conquer all the labyrinths for their Ancient Magics. Over two months, Hajime takes advantage of Oscar's treasure, library and workshop to learn as much as he can, crafting weapons and vehicles and outfitting himself with an advanced prosthetic arm and a magical jewel to replace his eye. Yue continues seducing him several times, so he gives her a magical ring and warns her that his plans will eventually make them enemies of the Church and their God Ehit. Yue swears to stay with him regardless as they teleport to the surface.
5.5	5.5	"Omnibus: Great Orcus Labyrinth"; Transliteration: "Sōshūhen Orukusu Dai Meikyū" (Japanese: 総集編 オルクス大迷宮)	N/A	N/A	August 12, 2019	
A summary of the events so far.
6	6	"Worthless Rabbit"; Transliteration: "Zannen na Usagi" (Japanese: 残念なウサギ)	Kinji Yoshimoto	Naoki Ōdaira & Naoyuki Kuzuya	August 19, 2019	
Shea Haulia, a Rabbit-girl, waits impatiently at the spot Hajime and Yue are supposed to appear. When they arrive, Hajime and Yue attempt to ignore her as she is quite annoying. Hajime eventually agrees to listen, and she explains her tribe is threatened by monsters, and with her magical ability to predict possible futures she foresaw Hajime would save them. Hajime agrees in exchange for her guiding them to a Great Tree mentioned in Oscar’s library. Arriving at the tribe’s forest, Hajime kills several monsters, using an unfortunate Shea as bait. The rabbit-men ask Hajime for training as they are tired of being helpless. Hajime struggles to overcome their natural rabbit-like timidity, so he puts them through a merciless training routine of “kill monsters or I'll kill you instead”, turning them into tough monster killers. Shea takes them to the tree, which Hajime determines is the entrance to another labyrinth, but a stone slab nearby with slots for rings like Oscars, makes Hajime realise this labyrinth will only open after he has defeated other labyrinths first. The rabbit-men decide to continue training and guard the tree until Hajime returns. Shea, having fallen in love with Hajime, decides to travel with them and Yue is forced to let her after Shea technically wins a duel with Yue by managing to scratch Yue’s face.
7	7	"Great Reisen Labyrinth"; Transliteration: "Raisen Dai Meikyū" (Japanese: ライセン大迷宮)	Masaharu Tomoda	Masaharu Tomoda	August 26, 2019	
The three travel to Reisen Gorge, which contains the entrance to another labyrinth. They are greeted by the voice of hyperactive Liberator Miledi Reisen who built a maze-like labyrinth filled with practical jokes which mostly target Shea. Some of Hajime’s classmates decide to abandon exploring the labyrinth and help Aiko on the farms. Hajime and the girls make it to the bottom of the labyrinth to face the boss, Miledi herself, who is operating a giant robot. After a lengthy battle, they succeed in cracking her crystal heart. She uses the last of her energy to wish Hajime luck against Ehit; although Hajime claims he has no intention of defeating Ehit, Miledi assures him he will one day be a God-Killer. However, upon entering the treasure room they find the actual real Miledi’s soul inside a small, cartoonish golem, whom Shea punishes for all the pranks. For completing the labyrinth she gives Hajime her ring, and Yue her Ancient Gravity Magic. She then expels them from the labyrinth through a toilet-like whirlpool, though Shea drowns as she cannot swim. Hajime brings her back with CPR, but tries to drown her again after she wakes up and seizes the chance to violently kiss him. Tired, they find an inn where Shea loudly insists Hajime spend the night taking her virginity. Now publicly humiliated, Hajime prepares to punish Shea yet again.
8	8	"Reunion with the Past"; Transliteration: "Kako to no Saikai" (Japanese: 過去との再会)	Natsumi Yasue	Naoyuki Kuzuya	September 2, 2019	
Hajime is asked by the Adventurers' Guild to find a group of missing adventurers, including a noble’s son. They travel to the nearby farming village of Ur, unaware the farms are currently being visited by Aiko and some classmates, though one classmate, Shimizu, has disappeared. Hajime and the girls enter the inn where Aiko and the students are dining, and they are stunned when they hear Shea calling him by name. Aiko tearfully confronts him, but he ignores her or deflects her questions. They are confronted by an arrogant Templar Knight assigned to Aiko who insults Shea, so Hajime (nonfatally) shoots him. His classmates are shocked and scared by his new merciless personality, though Aiko swears she will find a way to bring him back. Later, Hajime visits Aiko alone to tell her the truth about the war against the demons: centuries ago, several humans discovered the truth that the God Ehit was not on their side, but merely controlling the unending war for his own amusement. These humans became the Liberators to free mortals from Ehit’s tyranny; unfortunately Ehit, through the Church, had them labelled heretics and renamed Mavericks, turning humanity against them. The remaining Liberators built the labyrinths to keep their Ancient Magics safe until someone capable of defeating Ehit came along to claim their powers. Before leaving, Hajime also tells Aiko plainly that one of his classmates tried to murder him. The next morning, Aiko and the students stubbornly insist on helping them search the mountains for the adventurers, as Aiko wants to ask more questions about the Liberators, and Hajime reluctantly agrees (as leaving them behind might cause problems).
9	9	"Dragon Slayer"; Transliteration: "Kokuryū o Ugatsu Mono" (Japanese: 黒竜を穿つ者)	Motoki Nakanishi	Naoyuki Kuzuya	September 9, 2019	
Once in the mountains, Hajime uses transmuted drones connected to his jewel eye to search for the missing adventurers. They find the noble's son, Will, the only survivor, who reveals they had been attacked by an army of monsters and a black dragon. While returning, they are attacked by the dragon. Hajime succeeds in knocking it from the sky and attempts to pierce its armour with his Pile Bunker, which can drive Azanthium stakes through any material. The dragon almost escapes until Shea knocks it out with her giant hammer Drucken. Deciding to forgo piercing the armour, Hajime sadistically shoves the stake into its only unarmoured area: the anus. However, the pain causes the dragon to reveal she is a female Dragonborn, capable of taking a human form and begs him to remove the stake in exchange for everything she knows. She admits she was magically forced by someone to attack Will and his friends, and as atonement offers to help them stop that person. Hajime decides to kill her anyway, but Yue convinces him to spare her. He removes the stake and the dragon transforms into a young woman named Tio, a shameless masochist who admits she enjoyed the stake...just a little. Now their ally, Tio reveals that the person, whoever he is, has an army of 60,000 monsters and is planning to attack the farming village.
10	10	"The Goddess' Sword"; Transliteration: "Megami no Ken" (Japanese: 女神の剣)	Hiroyuki Tsuchiya	Masaharu Tomoda	September 16, 2019	
Despite his better judgement and inclinations, Hajime is convinced by Aiko to defend Ur. He erects barricades around the village while avoiding the amorous intentions of Tio, who finds his mixture of neglect and verbal abuse exciting. On the morning of the attack, Hajime, in order to inspire Ur's defenders, dedicates their "guaranteed" victory to “Aiko, Goddess of Plenty” (embarrassing her), then proceeds to massacre the monster army with transmuted mini-guns and rocket launchers. With his mini-gun ammunition depleted and Yue and Tio out of magic, Hajime and Shea rush to capture the mysterious robed commander as the monsters retreat. The commander is captured, brought back to the village and revealed to be the missing student Shimizu. Shimizu admits he was disappointed not to be the only summoned Hero, especially as he paled in comparison to his more powerful classmates, so he signed a contract with a demon for his power in exchange for killing Aiko. Taking Aiko hostage in an attempt to escape, he scratches Aiko with a poisonous needle, but is shot from behind by a demon, who escapes on a flying monster. Hajime manages to shoot the fleeing sniper but only wounds him, and heals Aiko with Ambrosia via mouth-to-mouth. As Shimizu lies dying, Aiko begs Hajime to save him, but Hajime first demands to know if Shimizu is his enemy. Shizimu offers loyalty to Hajime, who spots the lie in his eyes and mercilessly executes him, devastating Aiko. As the group (which now includes Tio) and Will leave, Yue correctly guesses that the sniper was actually aiming at Aiko, so Hajime finished off Shimizu so Aiko would blame him and not herself, but that Aiko will eventually realize the truth, thereby enabling her to recover much quickly psychologically.
11	11	"The Monsters' Day Off"; Transliteration: "Bakemonotachi no Kyūjitsu" (Japanese: 化け物たちの休日)	Natsumi Yasue	Atsushi Ōtsuki	September 23, 2019	
A gang of slavers captures a rare mermaid child named Myu and plan to sell her. Hajime returns Will and collects the agreed fee. Deciding they need a break, Hajime and Shea explore the city as tourists while Yue and Tio go shopping. At an aquarium, Hajime and Shea meet a sentient talking fish and decide to free him. As thanks, the fish passes on information about a captured mer-child. Hajime and Shea wander the city until he senses the child in the sewers underground and rescues her, enraging the slavers' boss. Hajime and Shea keep the girl, whose name is Myu, safe, but struggle with what to do next. Elsewhere, Yue and Tio discuss sharing Hajime between them. Hajime decides to deliver Myu to the city guards, despite her begging to stay with him. After a tearful Myu is handed over, the guardhouse is attacked and Myu kidnapped again. Enraged, Hajime, with Yue, Shea and Tio's help, begins tearing the city apart looking for the upcoming auction, while systematically eliminating known associates of the slavers and saving many children along the way. Locating the auction in a noble’s mansion, Hajime executes the boss, rescues Myu and blows up the mansion along with the auction's customers. Myu decides she wants to stay with the gang and starts calling an uncomfortable Hajime “Papa” (after his first asking her not to call him "Big Brother"), which causes Yue, Shea and Tio to demand that Hajime get them all pregnant with his children.
12	12	"A Looming Shadow"; Transliteration: "Shinobiyoru Kage" (Japanese: 忍び寄る影)	Hiroyuki Tsuchiya	Masafumi Tamura	September 30, 2019	
Despite his unease, Hajime takes to parenting Myu quite well. They return to the city where the Great Orcus Labyrinth is located. While Hajime and crew are visiting the Adventurers' Guild delivering a letter from another branch, a panicked Endou, one of Hajime's former classmates, bursts in and tells them that the Demon Cattleya had set a trap in the Labyrinth for the rest of the class. The class are overwhelmed by Cattleya’s summoned Monsters, unable to even get close to Cattleya to try killing her, while Captain Meld, who had held off attacking monsters to give Endou a chance to escape, is seriously wounded. Hajime is indifferent until Endou upsets Myu, making him downright refuse to help at all. A student, Suzu, is wounded and partially petrified, causing most of the class to flee. Hiyama and Nakamura both suggest signing contracts with the demon to survive. Kouki, the main Hero who refuses to back down, overpowers Cattleya, but after a dropped locket with a picture of her lover makes him realize she has a life outside the war as well, he hesitates and drops his guard, causing him to be attacked from behind and wounded. With support from the girls, Hajime decides to save his classmates. Shizuku’s sword is broken during the battle, so Kaori prepares to die alongside her. However, they are saved at the last second by Hajime, who had created a shortcut using his Pile Bunker piledriver to blast through the upper floors. Kaori, hearing his voice, is stunned to realize that Hajime is still alive.
13	13	"The Best at Being the Worst"; Transliteration: "Munō no Musō" (Japanese: 無能の無双)	Naoki Ōdaira & Satomi Nakamura	Naoki Ōdaira	October 7, 2019 (Note: This episode aired at 8:00 p.m. JST, 3 hours and 30 minutes before the original air time on AT-X.)	
Hajime uses his Pile Bunker to blast a hole all the way down to the level where his classmates are being attacked, with the metal stake impaling the two monsters about to kill Kaori and Shizuku. Hajime sees through Cattleya’s magic and kills all her monsters as the girls protect the class. When Endou reveals Hajime's identity, the others are stunned, while Hiyama is terrified, fearing he will be revealed as Hajime's attempted murderer. Hajime transmutes Shizuku a new indestructible and super-sharp katana sword, which she uses to decimate a snake monster. Myu calls Hajime “Papa”, confusing everyone and upsetting Kaori. Cattleya attempts to flee, but is cornered by Hajime, who tortures her for information, shocking his classmates. When Cattleya still refuses to talk, Hajime correctly deduces that a demon had cleared one of the labyrinths and is using its Ancient Magic to create a monster army. With his questions answered, Hajime prepares to kill Cattleya. Cattleya warns him that her lover will kill him in revenge, but Hajime kills her anyway, to Kouki's horror. Using Hajime's Holy Water, Captain Meld is healed. In the aftermath, Kouki is outraged that Hajime executed the helpless Cattleya, so Hajime berates him in return for being too weak to do what is necessary, warning Kouki if he or any of his former classmates get in his way he will kill them too. Back outside, Kaori finally confesses that she loves Hajime, but he gently rebuffs her as he already loves Yue. Kaori insists on joining his group anyway to compete with Yue (while also demanding an explanation about Myu's calling him "Papa"). When Shizuku later tries to return the sword Hajime gave her, he tells her to keep it, and it is suggested she may be developing feelings for him. As they leave in Hajime’s transmuted SUV, Kaori is annoyed to discover she must share the back seat with Shea and Tio while Yue and Myu automatically get the passenger seat beside Hajime. Hajime remains determined to make it back to Japan no matter who he has to kill, even God himself.
OVA–1	OVA–1	"Yue's Diary"; Transliteration: "Yue no Nikkichō" (Japanese: ユエの日記帳)	Naoki Ōdaira	Naoki Ōdaira	December 25, 2019	
While enjoying a bath at a hot spring, Shea, Tio, Kaori and Myu stumble across Yue’s diary, beginning with meeting Hajime and her seduction of him. She describes meeting Shea, the "worthless rabbit" and coming up with ways to torment her for falling in love with Hajime. She also describes her addiction to Hajime-nium, her name for Hajime’s blood. Then, after Shea defeated her in their duel she starts describing her fondly, admiring her skill and determination. Next she describes meeting the annoying Miledi, after which Yue describes feeling an almost sisterly bond with Shea and deciding to protect her. This causes Shea to burst into tears. She also describes meeting Tio, the “worthless dragon” and helpless pervert, as well as her jealousy of Hajime giving Aiko Ambrosia mouth-to-mouth and wonders if Hajime might be a sexual sadist or have a teacher fetish. Next, she describes meeting Myu, how seeing her cling to Hajime while insistently exclaiming "Papa!" had given rise to a desire to have a child with him. Lastly, the diary describes Yue meeting Kaori, the result of which being Yue's overwhelming desire to defeat Kaori and keep Hajime for herself. Yue finally arrives and, upon discovering the girls huddled over her diary, she punishes them - severely. Lastly, diary in-hand, she thoughtfully writes "it is a good day when you can punish the people you care about".
0	0	"Prologue"; Transliteration: "Purorōgu" (Japanese: プロローグ)	N/A	N/A	January 19, 2020	
The episode takes place shortly before the events of the main story. As Hajime was called out by both Daisuke Hiyama, and then Kaori Shirasaki for being late in class, Kouki Amanogawa warns Nagumo that he cannot rely on Kaori's kindness forever. As homeroom teacher Aiko Hatayama arrives for a lecture, she and her students are being summoned by Ehit. As they are summoned into the palace, Heiligh Kingdom Commander Meld Hoggins gave each of them status plates. Much to Nagumo's embarrassment and Hiyama's joy, he is given the "Synergist" role, among which he has the capability to transmute matter.
OVA–2	OVA–2	"Hot Love Springs Eternal"; Transliteration: "Naresome Onsen" (Japanese: なれそめ温泉)	Naoki Ōdaira	Naoki Ōdaira	February 26, 2020	
While bathing with Myu, Hajime overhears the ladies in the women’s baths talking. First, the girls demand the story of how Kaori met Hajime. She reveals it was when she saw him defending a grandmother and grandson from thugs, despite still being weak at the time, and she fell in love with his humility, not his strength. Yue jealously labels her a stalker, prompting Kaori to insist upon the details of Yue's first encountering and meeting Hajime. Yue describes being trapped in the crystal, and Hajime almost abandoning her, but then reconsidering after she literally begged him. Shea interrupts with her tale of meeting Hajime after he defeated the labyrinth, also begging him for help, then being used as bait to hunt monsters. Finally, Tio recounts her story of Hajime trying to kill her by impaling a spike up her anus while in her dragon form. Pushed beyond embarrassment, Hajime tries to stop Myu hearing what the ladies are saying. Kaori wonders how so many weird meetings caused anyone to fall in love with Hajime. As soon as they leave the baths, they resume competing for the harried Hajime.

=== Season 2 (2022) ===
No. overall	No. in season	Title	Directed by	Storyboarded by	Original release date	Ref.
14	1	"Irregular"; Transliteration: "Iregyurā" (Japanese: イレギュラー)	Kaito Asakura	Kaito Asakura	January 13, 2022 (Note: Episode 1 and 2 were pre-screened on December 25, 2021.)	
Kouki returns with the others to the castle, disheartened by the fact that Kaori had not only confessed her love for Hajime, but had also left the class to be with him. Meanwhile, Hajime's group, now including Kaori, travels the Gruen Desert, where they are attacked by dozens of Sand Worms. After defeating the monsters, they rescue a noble named Bize Feuward Zengen, the son of the Duke of Ankaji. Bize is afflicted with a strange condition that overloads his body with mana and which will eventually kill him. He reveals that Ankaji is in a dire situation, with its water supply poisoned or tainted, causing the inhabitants to begin exhibiting symptoms of the same "mana overload" ailment afflicting Bize. Hajime and the girls soon decide to help the Anjaki residents. Meanwhile, General Freid of the Demon Army informs his subordinate Mikhail (Cattleya's lover) first of her death, then of the destruction of Shimizu's monster army - both caused by Hajime's actions. Freid begins making preparations for facing "the Irregular" in battle and killing him.
15	2	"Burning Light"; Transliteration: "Shakunetsu no Hikari" (Japanese: 灼熱の光)	Takao Kato & Natsumi Uchinuma	Kaito Asakura	January 20, 2022	
Hajime's party arrives at Ankaji, where they provide a new water supply to the citizens afflicted by the curse and destroy the monster responsible for infecting the city's main oasis. While Kaori stays behind to treat the sick with Myu, Hajime and the rest of the party infiltrate the Gruen Volcano, the site of the third labyrinth and the source of a mineral necessary to cure Ankaji's sick. The group push forward through great rivers of molten lava all the way to the core, which they discover is guarded by a hundred monsters. Hajime and the girls readily attack the monsters guarding the core, but just as they slay the last of them, a massive beam of light strikes Hajime. Desperately concerned for his safety, they immediately converge to protect him, then prepare to ferociously retaliate.
16	3	"Black and White"; Transliteration: "Kuro to Shiro" (Japanese: 黒と白)	Kazuya Fujishiro	Seiki Tanaka	January 27, 2022	
Hajime is wounded by Freid's surprise attack, but despite having the advantage the enemy fails to defeat Hajime's party in combat. As a last resort, Freid destroys the controls that keep the volcano from erupting and traps Hajime and the others inside so that the eruption will kill them. Before the volcano is sealed, Hajime instructs Tio (owing to her Dragon talents) to quickly escape with the gathered mineral cure to rejoin Kaori and Myu in Ankaji while he and the others look for another exit. Meanwhile, at the palace, Shizuku is informed by Princess Liliana that the King intends to brand Hajime as a heretic for his defiance. Daisuke Hiyama, the student who unknown to the others had intentionally targeted Hajime (resulting in his fall and near death within the labyrinth), is increasingly despondent since Kaori (an object more of lust than any imagined "love") has joined Hajime after confessing her love to him. Meanwhile, another classmate, whose identity is a mystery, reveals that they've known all along that Hiyama had intentionally tried to kill Hajime at Orcus. This mystery person approaches Hiyama, proposing an alliance while subtly hinting that Hiyama has no choice but to accept.
17	4	"Reunion"; Transliteration: "Oyako no Saikai" (Japanese: 親子の再会)	Ryō Miyata	Naoyuki Kuzuya	February 3, 2022	
Having barely escaped from her pursuers, Tio returns to Ankaji and is treated by Kaori and Myu, while Hajime, Yue and Shea reach the core of the labyrinth and claim its Ancient Magic before escaping in a submarine created by Hajime. Some time later, the party regroups in the middle of the ocean and arrives at the sea city of Erisen, home to the merfolk, where Myu is reunited with her mother. Meanwhile, Shizuku consults with Aiko and learns that Hajime has been officially branded as a heretic by the Church for refusing to comply with their orders and that both her pleas for him and his actions in saving people have been totally ignored. Aiko also reveals that both the king and the nobles are behaving strangely and that Hajime had told her something very important that she needs to share with her students.
18	5	"Memories from the Bottom of the Sea"; Transliteration: "Kaitei no Kioku" (Japanese: 海底の記憶)	Hiromichi Matano	Naoyuki Kuzuya	February 10, 2022	
The party departs Erisen to explore the underwater ruins of Melousine, the site of the fourth labyrinth. As they fight their way inside the ruins, they encounter a powerful monster. As the group retreats, Hajime and Kaori become separated from the others. The pair continues fighting the illusory foes of the labyrinth together until they finally find time to rest and confer about their circumstances. Hajime reprimands Kaori for continuing to compare herself and feel inferior to Yue, who stood beside Hajime when he was most in need of someone, but reiterates that Yue is the one he loves and suggests that Kaori leave the party if she can't accept that. Meanwhile, back at the castle, before she can share Hajime's information with the class, Aiko is kidnapped by a mysterious nun, an act Lilliana secretly witnesses.
19	6	"Someone Important"; Transliteration: "Taisetsu na Hito" (Japanese: 大切な人)	Shintarō Itoga	Kaito Asakura	February 17, 2022	
Hajime and Kaori keep exploring the dungeon together until they watch a scene from the past where a peace treaty between the races is shattered by Ehit's intervention. As they proceed, a spirit possesses Kaori and attempts to kill Hajime, but he proceeds to torture it with magic bullets to force it to leave Kaori's body. After she is freed, Kaori kisses Hajime and affirms that she still loves him and wants to be by his side, despite his feelings for Yue. The two then reach the core of the Labyrinth, where they reunite with the others to claim the Ancient Magic. The monster who previously attacked the party returns to fight, but is destroyed by Hajime with help from the same sentient fish Hajime and Shea had freed on another occasion. Meanwhile, the rest of the students are worried about Aiko's disappearance, unaware that she is being held captive at the Divine Mountain.
20	7	"A New Vow"; Transliteration: "Arata na Chikai" (Japanese: 新たな誓い)	Satoshi Nakagawa	Atsushi Ōtsuki	February 24, 2022	
Hajime and the girls spend some days at Erisen, with Hajime reluctant about parting ways with Myu. Once her mother reassures Hajime that she will be fine with his departure, Hajime promises to Myu that he will take her to visit Japan once he finds a way back there. As the party departs to continue their journey, Liliana flees from the castle, certain that she can't trust anyone there, and the Demon Lord's forces prepare a large scale attack on the humans. Meanwhile, Commander Meld is considering sending a letter to Hajime to ask for his help when Hiyama appears to talk to him. One of Meld's subordinates is hypnotized and attempts to kill him, and just when Meld protects Daisuke from the attacker, Hiyama takes the opportunity to stab him from behind.
21	8	"A Disturbing Darkness"; Transliteration: "Fuon na Kage" (Japanese: 不穏な影)	Natsumi Uchinuma & Takao Kato	Atsushi Ōtsuki	March 3, 2022	
Meld escapes from his attackers, but is intercepted and killed by the apostle Noint. Meanwhile, Hajime's party rescues some travelers from a group of bandits and reunites with Liliana, who reveals that she ran away from the castle to look for a way to rescue Aiko, who is being held at the Divine Mountain--which is also the site of the fifth labyrinth. Hajime rescues Aiko from her cell, but they are attacked by Noint while an army of one hundred thousand monsters led by Freid and his subordinates approach the capital.
22	9	"Invasion of The Capital"; Transliteration: "Ōto Shinkō" (Japanese: 王都侵攻)	Kazuya Fujishiro	Yūichi Nihei	March 10, 2022	
Weakened by the priests' magic and protecting Aiko from harm, Hajime is at a disadvantage fighting Noint. Yue and Shea confront and defeat Freid and his soldiers (with Shea killing Mikhail and Yue re-opening Freid's previous near-fatal wound), forcing him to flee, while Kaori and Liliana search for the rest of Hajime's classmates. Tio rendezvouses with Hajime, who entrusts Aiko to her care and begins his counterattack.
23	10	"God's Apostle"; Transliteration: "Kami no Shito" (Japanese: 神の使徒)	Hiroaki Matsushima	Atsushi Ōtsuki & Naoyuki Kuzuya	March 17, 2022	
Having nothing left to hold him back, Hajime defeats Noint after a costly battle. Tio and Aiko combine their powers to launch an attack on the temple, but end up destroying it completely while killing everyone inside. Hajime rejoins the duo, and the image of one of the Liberators guides them to the core of the labyrinth, where they claim the Ancient Magic. Elsewhere, the students learn about the monster invasion and regroup with the knights by Eri's suggestion, but Eri betrays her classmates and subdues them with help from the knights under her control.
24	11	"Betrayal"; Transliteration: "Uragiri" (Japanese: 裏切り)	Natsumi Uchinuma	Naoyuki Kuzuya	March 24, 2022	
Eri reveals that she sided with the demons and used her necromancy to have the knights killed and turned into undead under her control, demonstrating by killing and resurrecting Kondo, one of her classmates. She also states that her main objective is to turn Kouki, with whom she is obsessed, into an undead as well so she can have him all to herself. Kaori and Lilliana arrive to help and Kaori uses her powers to heal the rest of the classmates, who begin to fight back. However, Hiyama mortally wounds Kaori from behind and Kouki is incapacitated by a poison Eri gave him with a kiss. As Eri is about to turn Kaori into an undead, Hajime arrives to intervene and incapacitates Hiyama with a vicious body punch. After Hajime dispatches the undead Kondo, Eri orders Meld, now an undead, to kill Hajime, but mustering his last bit of soul, Meld begs Hajime to set him free, to which Hajime obliges without question, then uses his minigun to mow down all of the undead knights. While Tio and Aiko tend to Kaori, Hajime is about to kill Eri when Hiyama attacks him. Hajime easily overpowers him, then throws him out of the arena to certain death as the monsters outside devour him. Freid arrives and demands that Hajime surrender, claiming that Hajime can never defeat the thousands of monsters invading the city; however, Hajime easily does just that with a space-based laser developed by him, then coldly dismisses Freid. Eri takes the opportunity to escape with Freid, and Hajime's party take Kaori's body, having a plan in mind to fully resurrect her.
25	12	"A New Journey"; Transliteration: "Arata na Tabidachi" (Japanese: 新たな旅立ち)	Kaito Asakura	Kaito Asakura	March 31, 2022	
Hajime and the others manage to preserve Kaori's soul, but by her request they implant it in Noint's restored body so that she can increase her combat abilities while having her original body preserved for when they return to Japan. After they all return five days later, Hajime reveals to the other students Ehit's true intentions and Kouki insists that they should fight together to save the world, but Hajime isn't interested and states that he is focused on returning to their own world instead. Despite that, the students decide to join forces with Hajime and split into two groups: one remaining behind to safeguard the kingdom and the other (including Shizuku and Kouki) accompanying Hajime's party to the next labyrinth in order to get stronger while escorting Liliana to meet the emperor in the capital in their effort to stop Ehit's plans. Hajime tells them that he can only guide them to the labyrinths and they must conquer the labyrinths themselves to gain Ancient Magic, but still agrees, privately planning to use them as "meat shields" if necessary.
26	13	"Arifureta: From a Detour to The World's Strongest"; Transliteration: "Arifureta Yorimichi de Sekai Saikyō" (Japanese: ありふれた寄り道で世界最強)	Naoyuki Kuzuya	Kaito Asakura	April 7, 2022	
This episode takes place before Episode 1 of Season 2. While Kaori heals some travelers, Shea, Tio, and Myu ask Yue to teach them magic. Hajime warns them not to and is proven right because Yue's explanations are too vague and make no sense. However, Kaori joins the lesson and instantly learns a force field spell to everyone's surprise. They stop in a town and by Myu's suggestion swap clothes to see how it is like. Myu wears Yue's, Yue wears Tio's, Tio wears Myu's, Shea wears Kaori's, and Kaori wears Shea's. Hajime is impressed, but Kaori is embarrassed by Shea's revealing outfit. After switching back and going back on the road, Yue is bothered that Myu always calls her "Big Sister" instead of "Mama". Myu assures her that she loves her and pats her head, causing Yue to regress to an infantile state and almost making Hajime lose control of the vehicle due to how cute they look.
OVA–4	OVA–4	"The Miraculous Meeting and The Phantasmagorical Adventure (Chapter.1)"; Transliteration: "Maboroshi no Bōken to Kiseki no Kaigō (Chaputā.Wan)" (Japanese: 幻の冒険と奇跡の邂逅（Chapter.1）)	Kaito Asakura	Kaito Asakura	September 25, 2022	
This story takes place between Episodes 6 and 7. After returning from the Sunken Ruins of Melusine, Hajime decides to take Myu (along with Remia) on one last adventure before they part ways. However, the trip ends up being much more dangerous than they expected.
OVA–5	OVA–5	"The Miraculous Meeting and The Phantasmagorical Adventure (Chapter.2)"; Transliteration: "Maboroshi no Bōken to Kiseki no Kaigō (Chaputā.Tsū)" (Japanese: 幻の冒険と奇跡の邂逅（Chapter.2）)	Kaito Asakura	Kaito Asakura	September 25, 2022	
The present meets the past (or the past meets the future) when Hajime and his party are transported to a mysterious ruined city where, after Myu learns the reason for their being brought here by a White Whale of Light, they meet and join forces with four of the Liberators, who were also transported here from the past. Now they have to work together (despite Hajime, Yue and Shea's strong feelings about one of the Liberators) to battle and seal away an ancient evil before they can be returned to their original worlds.

=== Season 3 (2024–2025) ===
No. overall	No. in season	Title	Directed by	Storyboarded by	Original release date
27	1	"Haulias Assemble"; Transliteration: "Usamimi Sanjō" (Japanese: ウサミミ参上)	Kaito Asakura	Kaito Asakura	October 14, 2024
Boarding his new airship Fenrir, Hajime and the others travel to the location of the sixth labyrinth, but intend first to make a stop at the Hoelscher Empire (a ruthless militaristic kingdom) and leave Lilliana there to negotiate an alliance with the Emperor against the demons. They coincidentally reunite with members of the Haulia tribe who are engaged in freeing beastmen captured by the Empire's soldiers and learn from them that some of their people were captured by the empire to become slaves, including Shea's father. Shea insists that their mission to clear the next labyrinth is a priority, but Hajime notices her hidden feelings of worry about her people and encourages her to be honest. Per Shea's request, Hajime and his party decide to rescue the captive Haulias, who are being tortured in the Empire's dungeons.
28	2	"Roar of Revolution"; Transliteration: "Hanki no Otakebi" (Japanese: 反旗の雄叫び)	Kazuya Fujishiro	Satoshi Nakagawa	October 21, 2024
At the Hoelscher Empire, using Shizuku, Kouki, Suzu and Ryutarou as a diversion (wearing Power Ranger-type headmasks created by Hajime), Hajime, Yue and Shea free Shea's father and the other captured Haulia. Hajime learns from them that after the Haulia tribe's fame reached the Hoelscher Empire, the emperor decided to hunt all rabbitfolk in order to bolster his army and workforce, with the captive Haulia in fact obtaining intel in preparation for a special plan: to assassinate the Emperor in order to protect their people. Hajime decides to help the Haulia using a different method.
29	3	"The Princess's Ordeal"; Transliteration: "Ōjo no Junan" (Japanese: 王女の受難)	Hideaki Ōba	Naoyuki Kuzuya	October 28, 2024
After the party publicly enters the city through the main gate, they are all summoned by the emperor, Gahard D. Hoelscher, for an audience. During the occasion, Gahard attempts to persuade Hajime to join his side against the demon forces, but Hajime refuses. Hajime and the other learn that Lilliana is about to marry Gahard's son, Baius, in order to forge an alliance between Hoelscher and the Heiligh Kingdom. Kouki and the others attempt to dissuade Lilliana, but she insists that it is her duty as a princess to put her kingdom's future before her happiness. Gahard holds a banquet to celebrate his son's engagement, but just before the banquet begins Baius invades Lilliana's room and attempts to rape her, but is stopped by a mechanical spider sent by Hajime which injects him with a sleep drug. Meanwhile, Hajime and his party arrive at the banquet and begin to put their plan in motion.
30	4	"The Empire Versus The Strongest Rabbits"; Transliteration: "Teikoku VS Saikyō Usagi" (Japanese: 帝国VS最凶ウサギ)	Harume Kosaka	Naoyuki Kuzuya	November 4, 2024
The Haulia tribe invades the palace during the banquet and kills most of the guards. They confront and defeat Gahard, killing Baius and forcing the emperor and his subordinates to swear to release all the slaves and never attack them again, under a spell that will kill them should they break their promise. With the Haulia earning their independence and Lilliana's engagement cancelled, Hajime and co. decide to set out for the sixth labyrinth as they originally planned.
31	5	"The Hero Returns"; Transliteration: "Eiyū no Gaisen" (Japanese: 英雄の凱旋)	Hodaka Kuramoto	Yūji Kanzaki & Kaito Asakura	November 11, 2024
Taking Gahard prisoner, Hajime's group travel back to Verbergen, where they return the enslaved beastfolk to their families. Gahard refuses to make peace with the other races, affirming that his accord only applies to the Haulia, and to avoid trouble Hajime (roughly) sends him back home via teleportation. The council of races also ask Cam to join them, but he refuses. Later at night, Shea brings Hajime to her mother's resting place where he thanks her for meeting Shea and the two spend some time together. The next day, the group sets for the Great Tree, whose labyrinth is now accessible since Hajime had already previously cleared several other labyrinths. In the post credits, Hajime awakens in the human world with his body restored to his original form.
32	6	"Haltina's Labyrinth"; Transliteration: "Harutwina Daimeikyū" (Japanese: ハルツィナ大迷宮)	Mihiro Yamaguchi & Kaito Asakura	Yui Miura	November 18, 2024
Hajime (again roughly) teleports Lilliana back to the Heiligh Kingdom, where Aiko and the remaining students realize that she has falled for Hajime. Just after entering the labyrinth, Hajime notices that Yue, Tio and Ryutaro were replaced by clones and destroys them. Soon after, Hajime meets a goblin whom he immediately recognizes as Yue and learns that she and the other missing members were transformed into monsters in order to test the party's bonds. Reunited with the others, the group proceeds further until they are enveloped into a light and Hajime awakens in his home world with his body restored, with Yue, Shea, Tio, Kaori and Myu living a happy life as normal humans beside him. Hajime soon realizes that it is all an illusion and, resisting the temptation of living in an idyllic world instead of reality, manages to break free. Hajime is congratulated for clearing the test and awakens in a chamber where the other members, each encased in an amber-like material, are still sleeping.
33	7	"A Devilish Trial"; Transliteration: "Akuma no Shiren" (Japanese: 悪魔の試練)	Michita Shiraishi	Naoki Ōdaira	November 25, 2024
One by one, all of Hajime's companions return from their dreams, except for Kouki, Ryutaro and Suzu, whom Kaori uses her powers to forcibly awaken. The party proceeds further and discover that the Great Tree is far larger than they originally believed, with just its tip exposed above ground, when they are attacked by slimes who douse them into a liquid with aphrodisiac properties that almost make them lose control, except for Hajime and Tio. After the effect passes, they are attacked by a swarm of cockroaches that instills fear in them. While they are defending themself from the insects, they are suddenly bathed in the light from a magic circle, and Hajime suddenly starts feeling a deep hatred towards Yue, who now also feels the same towards him.
34	8	"Grab Hold of Hope"; Transliteration: "Kibō o Kono Te ni" (Japanese: 希望をこの手に)	Kazuya Fujishiro	Hōdai Shimotsuki	December 2, 2024
Hajime and Yue realize that the animosity between them is due to a spell that reverses their feelings. The others also keep fighting despite being affected by the spell, with Tio being the least afflicted due to the maturity she earned from living for centuries. The group fights wave after wave of insectoid monsters until Yue conjures an omnidirectional spell that destroys only the enemies while keeping allies unscathed, destroying all monsters and their source. Having completed the last trial, the party is guided to the resting place of the labyrinth master, Lyutillis Haltina, where a projection of her reveals that her gift is the ability to boost all kinds of magic and teaches them about a way to combine them to create a new type of magic called "Concept Magic" that can bypass the laws of nature. She presents Hajime with an item created using such magic, a compass that points to whatever the user wants, including other worlds, meaning it could potentially allow him to return to Japan.
35	9	"Changing Heart"; Transliteration: "Kawari Yuku Kokoro" (Japanese: 変わりゆく心)	Shinya Kawabe	Atsushi Ōtsuki	December 9, 2024
With all members (except for Kouki, Suzu and Ryutarou) successfully clearing the labyrinth, the party returns to Verbergen to celebrate. On the way, Shea gets jealous of Princess Altina getting too close to Hajime and learns that Altina did that to get her attention. Afterwards, Hajime approaches Shea and declares that despite his love for Yue, he also has feelings for her and kisses her. Kouki and the others ask Hajime to take them to challenge the last labyrinth as well because they intend to confront Eri in order to bring her back to her senses, to which he reluctantly agrees. Meanwhile in the Demon Nation, Eri creates an army of undead beastmen enhanced with magic for Freid in preparation for the imminent battle with her former classmates. Back on Erisen, Myu and her mother gaze at a floating figure (one of God's Apostles) that suddenly appears in the sky over the city.
36	10	"The Final Labyrinth"; Transliteration: "Saigo no Dai-Meikyū" (Japanese: 最後の大迷宮)	Hodaka Kuramoto	Akira Nishimori	December 23, 2024
Hajime upgrades the party's weapons, but claims Kouki's sword cannot be improved. Shizuku struggles to confront her feelings for Hajime. The party follows the compass to the snowy Schnee Fields, and while playing in the snow Shea falls off a cliff, so they follow her. After they all reunite down in an icy ravine, Hajime kills several rabbits that approach them, traumatizing Shea and most of the party until he explains they were monsters in disguise. They are attacked by ice monsters that regenerate and are controlled by a giant ice turtle. Kouki, Ryutarou, Shizuku, and Suzu take on the turtle while the others handle the rest. Kouki destroys the turtle, but fails to destroy its core, which another ice creature grabs and escapes with. Kouki screams that he must prove that he is better than Hajime, but is too tired to chase after it, so Shizuku has to destroy the core. Nevertheless, the ice creatures shatter and the entrance to the last labyrinth opens. After a short rest, the party enters, but Kouki begins to hear something no one else can hear.
37	11	"Charging Emotions"; Transliteration: "Kanjō no Hokosaki" (Japanese: 感情の矛先)	Kazuya Fujishiro	Akira Nishimori	December 30, 2024
The labyrinth is like an icy hall of mirrors. Kouki becomes increasingly stressed and paranoid when he is the only one who hears a voice telling him he is not strong enough to win. The others begin to hear voices of their own and Hajime deduces that the labyrinth is attacking their insecurities when his voice calls him a freak who does not deserve to return home. Shizuku remembers always putting others needs above her own as her voice tells her she will always be alone. As Kouki's voice says that Hajime takes everything from him, he sees his reflection smile mockingly on its own at him, but when Shizuku says he imagined that, he becomes angry and points out she would have believed Hajime instantly. In another great chamber, they are attacked by ice knights and fight back, but Kouki's, Kaori's and Shizuku's attacks start to get misdirected against Hajime, Yue and Shea, and they argue until Tio deduces the voices are causing this. They realize each party member has to defeat a specific knight to advance and they all eventually succeed. As they pass through a gate, they are all separated. In one chamber, Hajime's reflection comes to life.
38	12	"True Heart"; Transliteration: "Hontō no Kokoro" (Japanese: 本当の心)	Michita Shiraishi	Akira Nishimori	January 20, 2025
Hajime deduces that the test is for anyone challenging the labyrinth to face and overcome their own dark side. The reflection switches to negative colors and attacks Hajime while taunting him that he fears not being accepted on Earth and that his love for Yue is not real. Hajime simply overpowers the reflection and destroys it. Shizuku is attacked by her own negative-colored reflection, who taunts her that she fears not being seen as feminine, death and not being able to admit her feelings for Hajime, then reveals that Shizuku secretly hates Shea and Yue for getting together with him. Shizuku is swiftly overwhelmed and injured, and collapses begging for someone to save her. The reflection tries to finish her off, but Hajime arrives and blocks its sword.
39	13	"Thank God She's Still a Pervert!"; Transliteration: "Yokatta! Yappari Hentai da!" (Japanese: 良かった！やっぱり変態だ！)	Mitsuo Hashimoto	Naoyuki Kuzuya	January 27, 2025
Hajime heals Shizuku, but when she is too scared to fight her reflection he offers her another pink Power Ranger-type helmet, motivating her to fight to avoid wearing it. She destroys the reflection, but is exhausted and loses her hairband. Hajime makes her a new one with a healing effect and carries her piggyback, and she confesses her feelings for him, shocking him. Meanwhile, a transformed Eri awakens from a dream about Suzu as Freid arrives to tell her that it is almost time to return to battle. Suzu fights her reflection who taunts her for running away from problems with a fake smile and not doing anything when she noticed something was wrong with Eri. Suzu admits her faults and destroys the reflection before fainting. Ryutaro finds and carries her, saying he defeated his reflection who taunted him for being weaker than Hajime and Kouki. The two find Tio fighting her reflection, who taunts her for secretly wanting to rampage and get revenge for the destruction of her country and people. Tio calmly says she is a dignified dragon, not an animal, and destroys the reflection. She then disgusts Suzu and Ryutaro by discussing the perverted things she wants Hajime to do with her as punishment for tricking the reflection. In the post credits, Yue stands on a battlefield full of corpses.
40	14	"The Overpowered Vampire Princess and the Godlike Rabbit's Grand Battle"; Transliteration: "Chīto Kyūketsu Hime to Bagu Usagi no Ōgenka" (Japanese: チート吸血姫とバグウサギの大喧嘩)	Shintarō Itoga	Naoki Ōdaira	February 3, 2025
Yue's uncle retrieves her from the battlefield and calls her by her original name: Aletia. This is a vision Yue received from her reflection, who taunts her that her uncle, whom she loved, betrayed and sealed her away. Yue points out that if she had not been imprisoned, she would never have met Hajime. Shea's reflection taunts her about being too weak to help her family, but Shea destroys it, saying she got over that long ago. Before being destroyed, Yue's reflection makes her question why she was sealed away in the first place. When Shea finds her, Yue, plagued with self doubt, tells her to take care of Hajime in case something happens to her. Insulted that Yue would even think of dying on Hajime, Shea attacks her. Kaori's reflection taunts her for being too weak to help Hajime and being jealous of the other girls, but Kaori rallies back that she cares about the other girls too. They suddenly stumble upon Yue and Shea's battle. Shea insults Yue's flat chest, infuriating her. They fight each other to exhaustion and Kaori's reflection gets killed by falling debris. Yue and Shea reconcile, but Kaori scolds them for interrupting her test.
41	15	"What Makes a Hero"; Transliteration: "Yūsha no Konkan" (Japanese: 勇者の根幹)	Kaito Asakura	Akira Nishimori	February 10, 2025
Kouki's reflection is effortlessly overpowering him and taunting him about being jealous of Hajime for stealing the role of Hero and the girls Kouki believes he deserves. When Hajime and Shizuku arrive, an enraged Kouki attacks Hajime while the reflection attacks Shizuku. Kouki delusionally blames all his misfortunes on Hajime, believing Hajime brainwashed the girls into following him, and wants to kill him to become the true Hero and get the girls. When Hajime effortlessly defeats him, the reflection knocks Shizuku out and merges with Kouki to power him up. Everyone else arrives and urges Kouki to snap out of it, but he won't listen. Hajime beats him up and blasts him with a mana weapon that eradicates the reflection inside Kouki. Now completely powerless, Kouki begs Hajime to give back everything he believes Hajime took from him, but Hajime punches him out. Shizuku reveals she loves Hajime and the others are happy for her. Ryutaro carries Kouki as they discuss that he failed the trial and they will have to deal with him when he wakes up. They reach the palace of the labyrinth master, Vandre Schnee.
42	16	"The Key to the World"; Transliteration: "Sekai no Tobira o Hiraku Kagi" (Japanese: 世界の扉を開く鍵)	Kaito Asakura	Kaito Asakura	February 17, 2025
The group enters the palace, but upon entering the magic circle Hajime and Yue suddenly scream in pain and lose consciousness. When they wake up, they try to make love, only to be scolded when the others walk in. In a sitting room, Hajime and Yue explain that knowledge of concept magic was downloaded into their minds, and decide to combine their powers to create a way to reach Earth. As the rest of the party waits, they discuss that they still have to stop Eri, and Shea and Tio want to visit their homelands before going to Earth. Kouki wakes up and has regained his sanity, but he's still upset about all of Hajime's accomplishments and that he failed the labyrinth's test. When they check on Hajime and Yue, they are bombarded by Hajime's memories of falling and struggling to survive in the Orcus Labyrinth, and many are moved to tears, learning that Hajime's greatest wish is to go home. Hajime and Yue complete a key that can open portals. After Suzu takes a detour to Verbergen to tame some beasts, the party rides an ice dragon to the demon realm to confront Eri. Yue is looking forward to meeting Hajime's family. In the post credits, Eri and Freid assemble an army of God's Apostles similar and identical to Noint.
