= Two Brothers =

Two Brothers may refer to:

== Film and television ==
- Two Brothers (1929 film), a German silent film directed by Mikhail Dubson
- Two Brothers (2004 film), a French-British film directed by Jean-Jacques Annaud
- The Two Brothers (film), a 1910 American short Western film directed by D. W. Griffith
- Do Bhai (disambiguation) (lit. 'Two Brothers'), various Indian films
- Two Brothers Pictures, a British television production company founded in 2014

== Literature and folklore ==
- Tale of Two Brothers, an ancient Egyptian story
- The Two Brothers, a German fairy tale
- The Two Brothers (novel), or La Rabouilleuse, an 1842 novel by Honoré de Balzac
- Dois Irmãos (Two Brothers), a 2000 novel by Milton Hatoum
- Two Brothers (novel), a 2012 novel by Ben Elton

== Music ==
- "The Twa Brothers", a traditional ballad
- Two Brothers (album), a 2001 album by Boxhead Ensemble

== Places ==
- Two Brothers, U.S. Virgin Islands, a settlement on the island of Saint Croix
- Two Brothers Rocks, a rock formation in the Ionian Sea near Syracuse, Sicily

== Other ==
- Two Brothers (ship), a 19th-century Nantucket whaleship
- Two Brothers (video game), a 2013 action role-playing game
- Two Brothers Brewing, an American microbrewery
- Two Brothers Roundhouse, on the former Chicago & Aurora Railroad, in Aurora, Illinois, U.S.

== See also ==
- Deux Frères (disambiguation)
