= List of Arifureta volumes =

Arifureta is a Japanese light novel series written by Ryo Shirakome and illustrated by Takayaki, based on a web novel, that began in 2015. A spinoff series, Arifureta: From Commonplace to World's Strongest Zero began in 2017. In North America, both series are published digitally by J-Novel Club and in print by Seven Seas Entertainment.

The series has received three manga adaptations. The first, by RoGa, is an adaptation of the main novels. The second, Arifureta: I Love Isekai, is a yonkoma comedy-spinoff by Misaki Mori. The third, by Ataru Kamichi, is an adaptation of the Arifureta Zero spinoff novels. All three series are published in North America by Seven Seas Entertainment.

== Light novels ==
=== Arifureta: From Commonplace to World's Strongest ===
No.	Original release date	Original ISBN	English release date	English ISBN
1	June 25, 2015	978-4-86554-055-0	May 6, 2017 (digital); February 6, 2018 (print)	978-1-626927-68-1
"Prologue"; 1. "Summoned to Another World With a Commonplace Class"; 2. "The Monster of the Abyss"; 3. "The Golden Vampire Princess"; 4. "Guardian of the Depths"; 5. "Setting Off"; "A Very Prologue-ish Epilogue"; Extra Chapter: "An Unwinnable Battle"
2	November 25, 2015	978-4-86554-073-4	July 21, 2017 (digital); May 1, 2018 (print)	978-1-626927-80-3
1. "Boy Meets... Worthless Rabbit?"; 2. "Rabbit Reformation"; 3. "The Reisen Labyrinth"; 4. "Miledi Reisen"; "Epilogue"; Extra Chapter: "Yeah, I'm a Monster. Got a Problem With That?"
3	February 25, 2016	978-4-86554-093-2	October 7, 2017 (digital); August 7, 2018 (print)	978-1-626928-45-9
"Prologue"; 1. "An Adventurer's Job"; 2. "A New Meeting"; 3. "The Sack of Ur"; "Epilogue I"; "Epilogue II"; Extra Chapter: "A Very Dramatic Before and After"
4	July 27, 2016	978-4-86554-143-4	December 23, 2017 (digital); December 18, 2018 (print)	978-1-626929-49-4
1. "Hajime Becomes an XXX"; 2. "A Looming Shadow"; 3. "A Generic NPC's Valiant Struggle"; 4. "Questioned Worth"; 5. "The Weakest and the Strongest"; Epilogue: "The Creeping Silver Malice and Madness"; Extra Chapter: "Kaori Shirasaki, Age 17. Specialty: Shock and Awe"
5	December 25, 2016	978-4-86554-178-6	March 10, 2018 (digital); April 2, 2019 (print)	978-1-642750-17-1
"Prologue"; 1. "The Grand Gruen Volcano"; 2. "The Sunken Ruins of Melusine"; 3. "A New Vow"; "Epilogue"; Extra Chapter: "Sunny With a Chance of Thunderstorms"
6	May 25, 2017	978-4-86554-219-6	May 26, 2018 (digital); July 9, 2019 (print)	978-1-642751-11-6
"Prologue"; 1. "A Disturbing Darkness"; 2. "Invasion of the Capital"; 3. "God's Apostle"; 4. "Betrayal"; 5. "The Events of a Single Day"; "Epilogue"; Extra Chapter: "The Secret Society, "Soul Sisters.""
7	December 25, 2017	978-4-86554-265-3; 978-4-86554-266-0 (SE)	August 11, 2018 (digital); December 10, 2019 (print)	978-1-642757-36-1
"Prologue"; 1. "Haulias Assemble!"; 2. "Roar of Revolution"; 3. "The Princess' Ordeal"; 4. "The Empire vs. the Strongest Rabbits"; "Epilogue"; Extra Chapter: "Lingering Feelings"
8	April 25, 2018	978-4-86554-308-7; 978-4-86554-309-4 (SE)	October 28, 2018 (digital); July 7, 2020 (print)	978-1-64505-435-1
1. "The Hero Returns"; 2. "Haltina's Labyrinth"; 3. "Grab Hold of Hope"; 4. "A Changing Heart"; "Epilogue"; Extra Chapter: "Verbergen's Monthly Magazine"
9	December 25, 2018	978-4-86554-428-2	June 8, 2019 (digital); August 25, 2020 (print)	978-1-64505-485-6
"Prologue"; 1. "The Final Labyrinth"; 2. "Whispers"; 3. "Charging Emotions"; 4. "True Heart"; Extra Chapter: "Girls' Talk: Midnight Edition"; Bonus Short Story: "Nightmare Holiday"
10	June 25, 2019	978-4-86554-489-3; 978-4-86554-490-9 (SE)	November 3, 2019 (digital); October 20, 2020 (print)	978-1-64505-747-5
"Prologue"; 1. "The Overpowered Vampire Princess and the Godlike Rabbit's Grand Battle"; 2. "Thank God She's Still a Pervert!"; 3. "What Makes a Hero"; 4. "The Key to the World"; Extra Chapter: "The Seven Most Important Things for an Otherworld Summoning"
11	July 25, 2020	978-4-86554-698-9	December 14, 2020 (digital); April 13, 2021 (print)	978-1-64505-746-8
"Prologue"; 1. "The Demon Lord's Invitation"; 2. "The Tiny Hero"; 3. "An Instigator Worse Than God"; 4. "Before The Decisive Battle"; 5. "An Unparalleled Declaration Of War"; Extra Chapter: "The Day All Dragonmen Cried"
12	January 25, 2022	978-4-8240-0064-4	June 23, 2022 (digital); March 28, 2023 (print)	978-1-64827-929-4
"Prologue"; 1. "God's Domain"; 2. "An Outstretched Hand"; 3. "Their Own Endings"; 4. "The White Dragon and the Silver Apostle"; 5. "Ragnarok"; 6. "Shea Haulia's Utter Domination of the Platinum Apostles"; 7. "Dragon God's Advent"; 8. "Unexpected Aid"; "Epilogue"; Extra Chapter: "An Affectionate Challenge for the Vampire Princess"
13	September 25, 2022	978-4-8240-0263-1; 978-4-8240-0264-8 (SE)	March 24, 2023 (digital); October 24, 2023 (print)	978-1-64827-318-6
"Prologue"; 1. "Humanity's Full Might"; 2. "Everyone's Battlefields"; 3. "The Valkyrie's Pride"; 4. "The Truth Behind God and the Final Battle"; 5. "From Run of the Mill to King of the Hill"; 6. "The End of a Journey"; "Epilogue"; Extra Chapter: "Another Epilogue"
14	December 25, 2024	978-4-8240-0970-8	June 16, 2025 (digital)	978-1-71831-980-6
1. "An Everyday(?) Morning in the Nagumo Household Part One"; 2. "An Everyday(?) Morning in the Nagumo Household Part Two"; 3. "The Nagumos' Day Off"; 4. "The Angel's Guardian"; 5. "The Yaegashi Family's Secret"; 6. "Aiko-Sensei's Worries"; 7. "A Not-So-Normal School Life"; 8. "Reunions at the Closing Ceremony"; 9. "First Christmas"; 10. "Surviving A Turbulent Year"; 11. "Greeting The New Year with a New Family"

=== Arifureta Zero ===
No.	Original release date	Original ISBN	English release date	English ISBN
1	December 28, 2017	978-4-86554-267-7	April 11, 2018 (digital); September 3, 2019 (print)	978-1-64505-173-2
"Prologue"; 1. "The Meeting That Started it All"; 2. "Reisen and Orcus"; 3. "The Macho Fairy of the Desert"; 4. "The Liberators and God's Apostles"; "Epilogue"
2	July 25, 2018	978-4-86554-373-5	February 2, 2019 (digital); January 7, 2020 (print)	978-1-64505-176-3
"Prologue"; 1. "The Saint of the Western Seas"; 2. "Ghost Ship, Bane of Pirates"; 3. "Divine Punishment"; 4. "A Legendary Battle"; "Epilogue"
3	March 25, 2019	978-4-86554-464-0	November 16, 2019 (digital); August 4, 2020 (print)	978-1-64505-461-0
"Prologue"; 1. "The Merry Band of Liberators"; 2. "A New Ancient Magic User"; 3. "The Demon Army Vs. The Liberators"; "Epilogue"
4	December 25, 2019	978-4-86554-543-2	July 6, 2020 (digital); December 29, 2020 (print)	978-1-64505-790-1
"Prologue"; 1. "War and an Unexpected Reunion"; 2. "Queen of the Forest"; 3. "Shared Destiny"; 4. "Miledi Reisen's True Mettle"; "Epilogue"
5	April 25, 2021	978-4-86554-823-5	December 1, 2021 (digital); March 15, 2022 (print)	978-1-64827-258-5
1. "There's No Way My Little Miledi Can Be This Cute!"; 2. "Laus's Great Escape"; 3. "Spirits of the Lake"; 4. "Liberators Assemble"; 5. "Tolling the Bells of Revolution"
6	December 25, 2021	978-4-86554-889-1	August 4, 2022 (digital); February 7, 2023 (print)	978-1-64827-465-7
"Prologue"; 1. "Total Warfare"; 2. "The Dragon Kingdom and an Old Legend"; 3. "The Vampire Nation and Forgotten Magic"; 4. "The End of the World"; 5. "A Promise to the Future"; "Epilogue"; "In the Distant Future"

== Manga ==
=== Arifureta ===
No.	Original release date	Original ISBN	English release date	English ISBN
1	December 25, 2016	978-4-86554-183-0	March 13, 2018	978-1-626927-69-8
1. The Beginning (始まり, Hajimari); 2. Summoned to Another World (異世界召喚, Isekai Shōkan); 3. Jobs (天職, Tenshoku); 4. The Great Orcus Labyrinth (オルクス大迷宮, Orukusu dai Meikyū); 5. The Depths of the Abyss (奈落の底, Naraku no Soko); 5. Despair (絶望, Zetsubō); 6. A New Power (新たなる力, Aratanaru-ryoku); 7. The Meeting (出会い, Deai); Extra: A Fateful Introduction (その出会いは、運命だった, Sono Deai wa, Unmei datta)
2	September 25, 2017	978-4-86554-261-5	July 3, 2018	978-1-62692821-3
8. Yue (ユエ, Yue); 9. Azure Blaze (蒼天, Sōten); 10. Yue's Eating Habits (ユエの食事, Yue no Shokuji); 11. A Field of Flowers (お花畑, Ohanabatake); 12. The Hundredth Floor (百層目, Hyaku-sō-me); 13. Defeat (喪失, Sōshitsu); 14. The Conclusion (決着, Ketchaku); 14.5. Oscar Orcus (オスカー・オルクス, Osukā Orukusu): Extra: Already!? (さっそく出たな!?, Sassoku deta na!?)
3	April 25, 2018	978-4-86554-343-8	November 27, 2018	978-1-626929-40-1
15. Shea Haulia (シア・ハウリア, Shia Hauria); 16. The Haulia Tribe (ハウリア族, Hauria-zoku); 17. Verbergen, The Country of Beastmen (亜人国フェアベルゲン, Ahito-koku Feaberugen); 18. Ten Days (十日間, Tōkakan); 19. Setting Off (旅立ち, Tabidachi); 20. The Reisen Labyrinth (ライセン大迷宮, Raisen dai Meikyū); Extra: Don't Get The Wrong Idea, Alright?! We're Not Friends Yet, Okay?! (勘違いしないで!?まだ友達なんかじゃないんだからね!?, Kanchigai Shinaide!? Mada Tomodachi nanka Janai ndakara ne!?)
4	December 25, 2018	978-4-86554-435-0	June 25, 2019	978-1-642750-07-2
21. A Heart Pounding Dungeon (ドキワク大迷宮!?, Doki waku Dai Meikyū!?); 22. Miledi Reisen (ミレディ・ライセン, Miredi Raisen); 23. Showdown (決戦, Kessen); 24. Do or Die (正念場, Shōnenba); 25. The Hideaway (迷宮の在処, Meikyū no Arika); 26. At the Inn (宿にて, Yado Nite); Extra: I-I Made Friends...Sorta... (と、友達が……できました（〃ﾟдﾟ〃）モジモジ, To, Tomodachi Ga…… Dekimashita (〃°Д°〃) Mojimoji); Bonus: Miledi-chan's Mega Makeover (ミレディちゃん大改造！！, Miredi-chan Dai Kaizō!!)
5	June 25, 2019	978-4-86554-505-0	January 21, 2020	978-1-64505-183-1
27. Under Attack (襲撃, Shūgeki); 28. Request (依頼, Irai); 29. Reunion (再会, Saikai); 30. Chance Encounter (遭遇, Sōgū); 31. Clash (激突, Gekitotsu); 32. Tio Klarus (ティオ･クラルス, Tio Kurarusu); Extra: Teacher? More Like "Cute Little Creature" (先生？いえ、小動物モドキです, Sensei? Ie, Shōdōbutsu Modokidesu)
6	April 25, 2020	978-4-86554-652-1	March 9, 2021	978-1-64505-730-7
33. New Equipment (新装備, Shin Sōbi); 34. The Blade of the Goddess (女神の剣, Megami no Ken); 35. Future Sight (未来視, Mirai-shi); 36. Demons (魔人族, Majin-zoku); 37. Discord (葛藤, Kattō); 38. Tio's Past (ティオの過去, Tio no Kako); Extra: Yue Does Not Approve! That's right, she's having none of it! (ユエさんは許しません！ええ、絶対に許しません！, Yue-san wa Yurushimasen! E e, Zettai ni Yurushimasen!)
7	October 25, 2020	978-4-86554-770-2	August 17, 2021	978-1-64827-910-2
39. Homecoming (帰還, Kikan); 40. Date (デート, Dēto); 41. Myu (ミュウ, Myū); 42. Papa (パパ, Papa); 43. Our War (私達の戦争, Watashitachi no Sensō); 44. Cheesy Theater (三文芝居, Sanmon Shibai); Extra: A Singular Method to Blissfully Calm my Overflowing Maternal Instincts (溢れ出る母柱への、たった一つのた冴えた鎮め方, Afure Deru Haha Hashira e no, Tatta Hitotsu Nota Saeta Shizume-kata)
8	April 25, 2021	978-4-86554-898-3	April 12, 2022	978-1-63858-197-0
45. Nagumo Hajime (南雲ハジメ, Nagumo Hajime); 46. Them (あの方, Ano Kata); 47. Shirasaki Kaori (白崎香織, Shirasaki Kaori); 48. What I Want (欲しいもの, Hoshīmono); 49. The Duchy of Ankaji (アンカジ公国, Ankaji Kōkoku); Extra: A Vampire Princess' Sharp Feminine Intuition (吸血姫様の冴え渡る女の勘, Kyūketsu Hime-sama no Saewataru On'na no Kan); Bonus: Tonight's Partner Is... (今宵のお相手は？, Koyoi no o Aite Wa?)
9	December 25, 2021	978-4-8240-0071-2	November 29, 2022	978-1-63858-770-5
50. Oasis Bottom (オアシスの底, Oashisu no Soko); 51. Grand Gruen Volcano (グリューエン大火山, Gurūen Kazan); 52. Take A Good Look (ちゃんと見て, Sore wa Chanto Mite); 53. Guardian (ガーディアン, Gādian); 54. Clear Condition (クリア条件, Kuria Jōken); Extra: Yue's Observation Log of the Unsettling-yet-Endearing Kaori (ユエのヤンかわ香織観察記, Yue no Yan ka wa Kaori Kansatsu-ki)
10	May 25, 2022	978-4-8240-0201-3	March 21, 2023	978-1-68579-483-5
55. Freid Bagwa (フリード・バグアー, Furīdo Baguā); 56. Pain Conversion (痛覚変換, Tsūkaku Henkan); 57. Great Eruption (大噴火, Dai Funka); 58. The Merfolk (海人族, Umibito-zoku); 59. Erisen (エリセン, Erisen); Extra: We Just Had a Little Tete-a-Tete, That's All... (二人つきいで OHANASHI しただけなのに, Futari-tsuki i de OHANASHI Shita Dakenanoni)
11	January 25, 2023	978-4-8240-0399-7	October 24, 2023	979-8-88843-028-6
60. Sunken Ruins (海底遺跡, Kaitei Iseki); 61. Ship Graveyard (船の墓場, Fune no Hakaba); 62. Party (パーティー, Pātī); 63. Precious (大切, Taisetsu); 64. Power of Restoration (再生の力, Saisei no Chikara); Extra: Are You Heartless? (人のふがないの？, Hito no fu ga nai no?)
12	July 25, 2023	978-4-8240-0569-4	March 26, 2024	979-8-88843-333-1
65. Wonderful People (素敵な人達, Sutekina Hitotachi); 66. Have A Safe Trip (いってらっしゃい, Itte Rasshai); 67. The Princess (王女様, Ōjo-sama); 68. Hollow (虚ろ, Utsuro); 69. The Irregular (イレギュラー, Iregyurā); Extra: I'll Never Forget That Warmth (あの温かさを忘わない, Ano Atataka-sa o Wasureru wa nai)
13	January 25, 2024	978-4-8240-0723-0	December 31, 2024	979-8-89160-624-1
70. One's Beloved (愛しき人, Itoshiki Hito); 71. Monster (化け物, Bakemono); 72. For Hajime (ハジメの為, Hajime no Tame); 73. Revival Reversal (懐刻, Futokoro Koku); 74. Playthings For The Bored (暇つぶしの駒, Himatsubushi no Koma); Extra: I Don't Know What Face I'm Supposed to Make at a Moment Like This (こんな時、どんな顔をしたら いいのか分からないの, Kon'na Toki, Don'na Kao o Shitara ī no ka Wakaranai no)
14	May 25, 2024	978-4-8240-0841-1	June 17, 2025	979-8-89373-316-7
75. Silver Aura (銀色のオーラ, Gin'iro no Ōra); 76. Farmer Skill (作農師スキル, Saku nō-shi Sukiru); 77. Starting Signal Flare (始まりの狼煙, Hajimari no Noroshi); 78. My Own Style Original (僕流オリジナル, Boku-ryū Orijinaru); 79. I'm Going to Fight (私は戦う, Watashi wa Tatakau); Extra: What She Felt in That Moment (その時、彼女が想うこと, Sonotoki, Kanojo ga Omou Koto)
15	January 25, 2025	978-4-8240-1042-1	January 13, 2026	979-8-89561-654-3
80. What The Hell's Going On Here? (どうなってやがる, Dō Natte ya Garu); 81. Loser (敗者, Haisha); 82. My Old Body (元の身体, Gen no Karada); 83. My Brand-New Body (新しい私の身体, Atarashī Watashi no Karada); 84. Humanity (人間らしさ, Ningenrashi-sa); Extra: I Was Right ... This Girl Was Unbearable! (こいつはやっぱり気にくわないっ, Koitsu wa Yappari ki ni Kuwanai)
16	August 25, 2025	978-4-8240-1322-4	August 11, 2026	979-8-89765-896-1
85. Reward (ご褒美, Gohōbi); 86. I Don't Understand It (よくわからない, Yoku Wakaranai); 87. Good to See You! (お久しぶりです！, Ohisashiburi Desu!); 88. The Hand of the Empire (帝国の手, Teikoku no Te); Bonus: Boss's Second Name (ポスの二つ名, Posu no Futatsumei); Extra: Yaegashi Shizuku's Heart (八重樫雫の心情, Yaegashi Shizuku no Shinjō)
17	August 20, 2026	978-4-8240-1816-8	—	—
89. Battle Scars (戦闘の傷跡, Sentō no Kizuato); 90. In Moderation! (ほどほどに！, Hodohodo ni!); 91. Masked Rangers (仮面レンジャー, Kamen Renjā); 92. We are Rabbitmen (我々は兎人族, Wareware wa Tojin-zoku); 93. Do Not Touch - Dangerous (触るな危険, Sawaruna Kiken); Extra: Shea Haulia's Feelings (Part One) (シア・ハウリアの心情前編, Shia Hauria no Shinjō Zenpen)

Chapters not yet in tankōbon format

The following chapters have not yet been collected in tankōbon format:

94. Head of the Empire (帝国の頭, Teikoku no Atama)

=== Arifureta: I Love Isekai ===
No.	Original release date	Original ISBN	English release date	English ISBN
1	April 25, 2018	978-4-86554-342-1	December 10, 2019	978-1-64275-761-3
1. Tabi no Hajimari (旅の始まり); 2. Tojin-zoku to no Sōgū (兎人族との遭遇); 3. Burukku no Machi (ブルックの町); 4. Raisen Dai Meikyū ① (ライセン大迷宮①); 5. Raisen Dai Meikyū ② (ライセン大迷宮②); 6. Fyūren e (フューレンへ); 7. Kokuryū (黒竜); 8. Ryūjin zoku no Onēsan ① (竜人族のお姉さん ①); 9. Ryūjin zoku no Onēsan ② (竜人族のお姉さん ②); 10. Shia no Tān (シアのターン); 11. Kaijin zoku no Ojōsan (海人族のお嬢さん); 12. Musume-san e no Tonchinkan'na Kidzukai (娘さんへの頓珍漢な気遣い)
2	December 25, 2018	978-4-86554-434-3	March 10, 2020	978-1-64505-214-2
13. Saikai (再会); 14. Makenai Mon (負けないもん); 15. Sabaku no Machi (砂漠の街); 16. Kazan no Meikyū (火山の迷宮); 17. Sōnan (遭難); 18. Myū no Okāsan (ミュウのお母さん); 19. Merujīne Kaitei Iseki (メルジーネ海底遺跡); 20. Shibashi no Wakare (しばしの別れ); 21. Yorimichi (寄り道); 22. Nointo (ノイント); 23. Atarashī Karada (新しい体); 24. Jigo Shori (事後処理)
3	June 25, 2019	978-4-86554-506-7	September 1, 2020	978-1-64505-515-0
25. Feruniru (フェルニル); 26. Tojin-zoku, Fautatabi (兎人族、ふたたび); 27. Teikoku Sen'nyū (帝国潜入); 28. Kōtei Gaharudo (皇帝ガハルド); 29. Pātī (パーティー); 30. Ussausa (ウッサウサ); 31. Kaihō (解放); 32. Henshin (変身); 33. Yume (夢); 34. Jukai no Shiren (樹海の試練); 35. Hanten (反転); 36. Yome Shia (嫁シア)
4	April 25, 2020	978-4-86554-653-8	October 12, 2021	978-1-64827-211-0
37. Yuki Asobi (雪遊び); 38. Yuki no Meikyū (雪の迷宮); 39. Kokoro no Koe (心の声); 40. Onore to Notatakai (己との戦い); 41. Hontō no Watashi (本当の私); 42. Kako no Jibun (過去の自分); 43. On'na no Yūjō? (女の友情？); 44. Kanojo no Shiren (彼女の試練); 45. Imawoikiru Ryūjinzoku (今を生きる竜人族); 46. Yūsha no Shiren (勇者の試練); 47. Otome no Shinpo (乙女の進歩); 48. Shito Futatabi (使徒再び)
5	January 25, 2023	978-4-8240-0398-0	—	—
49. Yōkoso Maō-jō (ようこそ魔王城); 50. Yuehito (ユエヒト); 51. Daijina Hito o Ubawa Rete (大事な人を奪われて); 52. Taisaku Kaigi (対策会議); 53. Sorezore no Junbi (それぞれの準備); 54. Atsumaru Chikara (集まる力); 55. Ai no Katachi? (愛のカタチ？); 56. Kimi mo Hajimenisuto (君もハジメニスト); 57. Watashi to Mushi to Suzu to (私と虫と鈴と); 58. Kessen Zen'ya (決戦前夜); 59. Tatakai no Ato wa... (戦いのあとは…); 60. Shin'iki Channeru (神域チャンネル); 61. Saikyō no Tabi (最強の旅)

=== Arifureta Zero ===
No.	Original release date	Original ISBN	English release date	English ISBN
1	July 25, 2018	978-4-86554-381-0	September 10, 2019	978-1-642756-86-9
1. The First Meeting (始まりの出会い, Hajimari no Deai); 2. An Invitation (勧誘, Kan'yū); 3. Miledi Reisen (ミレディ・ライセン, Miredi Raisen); 4. Free Will (自由な意志, Jiyūna Ishi); Extra: You Made Me Human (貴女が、私を人にした, Kijo ga, Watashi o Hito ni Shita)
2	December 25, 2018	978-4-86554-433-6	February 18, 2020	978-1-645052-00-5
5. The One I Admire (憧れの人, Akogare no Hito); 6. Just A Synergist (ただの錬成師, Tada no Rensei-shi); 7. Soldiers of God (神の兵士, Kami no Heishi); 8. Reisen and Orcus (ライセンとオルクス, Raisen to Orukusu); Extra: Belle, My New Journey Has Begun (ベル、私の新しい旅が始まったよ, Beru, Watashi no Atarashī Tabi ga Hajimatta yo)
3	June 25, 2019	978-4-86554-507-4	June 23, 2020	978-1-64505-466-5
9. The Fairy of the Desert (砂漠の妖精, Sabaku no Yōsei); 10. Troublesone Visitors (厄介な来訪者, Yakkaina Raihō-sha); 11. A Girl's Memories (少女の想い, Shōjo no Omoi); 12. Naiz Gruen (ナイズ･グリューエン, Naizu Guryūen); 13. Apostle of God (神の使徒, Kami no Shito); Extra: C'mon, Let's Change The World! (さぁ、世界を変えるぜ！, Sa, Sekai o Kaeru ze!)
4	April 25, 2020	978-4-86554-654-5	April 20, 2021	978-1-64827-097-0
14. Mortal Combat (死闘, Shitō); 15. Decisive Action (決着, Ketchaku); 16. To Be Worthy of That Name Again (もう一度その名で, Mōichido Sono Nade); 17. Westward, Westward (西へ西へ, Nishi e Nishi e); 18. Andika (アンディカ, Andika); 19. Ghost Ship, Bane of Pirates (海賊殺しのゴーストシップ, Kaizoku-goroshi no Gōsuto Shippu); Extra: A Lady Should Know How to Play Dress-Up! (コスプレは淑女の嗜み！, Kosupure wa Shukujo no Tashinami!)
5	October 25, 2020	978-4-86554-769-6	December 21, 2021	978-1-64827-380-3
20. The Saint of the Western Seas (聖女の正体, Seijo no Shōtai); 21. Big Sister (姉, Ane); 22. Footsteps Creeping Closer (忍び寄る足音, Shinobiyoru Ashioto); 23. Divine Punishment (神罰執行, Shinbatsu Shikkō); 24. A True Glimmer (本当の輝き, Hontō no Kagayaki); 25. We're Just Heretics! (ただの異端者だ！, Tada no Itan-shada!); Extra: The Big Sister Treatment (貴女を姉と呼びたくて, Kijo o Ane to Yobitakute)
6	April 25, 2021	978-4-86554-897-6	May 17, 2022	978-1-63858-279-3
26. Laus Barn (ラウス・バーン, Rausu Bān); 27. You Great Fools (大馬鹿者達, Ōbakamono-tachi); 28. Another Clash (激突再び, Gekitotsu Futatabi); 29. Daharl Devault (バハール･デヴォルト, Bahāru Devoruto); 30. We Are Not Dying Here! (死んでたまるか！, Shinde Tamaru ka!); Extra: I'm Human, Too! (私は一人の人間だ！, Watashi wa Hitori no Ningenda!)
7	December 25, 2021	978-4-8240-0070-5	November 15, 2022	978-1-63858-709-5
31. A Legendary Battle (神話の戦い, Shinwa no Tatakai); 32. Their Decisions (それぞれの選択, Sorezore no Sentaku); 33. Meiru Melusine (メイル・メルジーネ, Meiru Merujīne); 34. The Support Team (支援者, Shien-sha); 35. Attack (襲撃, Shūgeki); 36. Southward (南へ, Minami e); Extra: A True Mage (本当の魔法使いを目指して, Hontō no Mahōtsukai o Mezashite)
8	June 25, 2022	978-4-8240-0200-6	April 18, 2023	978-1-68579-464-4
37. Rescue Mission (救出作戦, Kyūshutsu Sakusen); 38. Rasul, the Demon Lord (魔王･ラスール, Maō Rasūru); 39. Brothers (兄弟, Kyōdai); 40. Counterattack (反撃, Hangeki); 41. The Truth (真実, Shinjitsu); 42. The Power of People (人の力, Hito no Chikara); 43. The Story of Many Become One (一に至る物語, Ichi ni Itaru Monogatari)
