= Daman Mills =

American voice actor

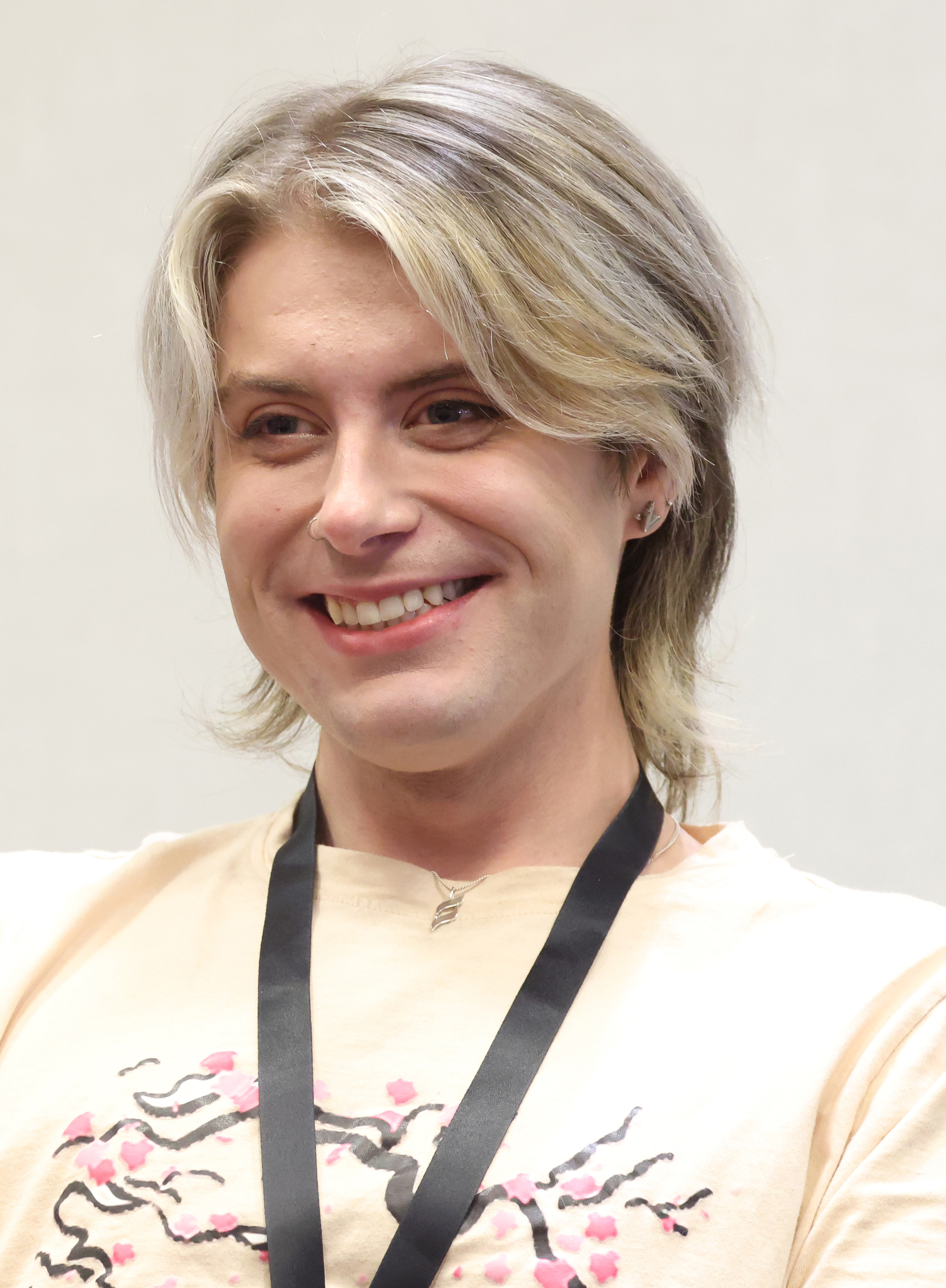
- Mills in 2025
- Occupations: Voice actor; ADR director
- Years active: 2015–present
- Notable credits: Frieza in Dragon Ball Super; N in Pokémon Masters; Legato Bluesummers in Trigun Stampede; Weiss the Immaculate in Final Fantasy VII Remake; Aogami in Shin Megami Tensei V; Yakov Feltsman in Yuri on Ice; Blade in Honkai: Star Rail; Lyney in Genshin Impact Yoshitaka Mine in Yakuza Kiwami 3; Johnny Joestar in "Steel Ball Run: JoJo's Bizarre Adventure"

Daman Mills is an American voice actor known for his work in anime and video game dubs. He served as an understudy for fellow voice actor Christopher Ayres for the role of Frieza in the Dragon Ball Super anime until he assumed the role completely following Ayres' death in 2021. He's also the English voice of Lain Valhalla in Beyblade Burst Surge.

== Personal life ==
Mills is an openly gay man. Mills has criticized the use of anime clips by the Donald Trump administration, writing that "I guarantee you most of, if not all of these different people that you are using their likeness to perpetuate your regime do not stand or agree with your message of violence, division, and hate" and "the blatant disrespect makes me sick".

== Filmography ==
=== Anime series ===
List of voice performances in anime series
Year	Title	Role	Notes	Source
2015	Holy Knight	Shinta Mizamura	Lead role	
2016	Yuri on Ice	Yakov Feltsman		
2016	Nanbaka	Jyugo	First lead role for Funimation	
2016	Cheer Boys!!	Zixuan		
2016	Touken Ranbu: Hanamaru	Honebami Toushirou		
2016	Trickster	Haruhiko		
2016	All Out!!	Kibi		
2017	ēlDLIVE	Laine		
2017	Masamune-kun's Revenge	Akio Tanabe		
2017	Chain Chronicle: The Light of Haecceitas	Velner		
2017	ACCA: 13-Territory Inspection Dept.	Prince Schwan		
2017	Akashic Records of Bastard Magic Instructor	Jatice Lowfan		
2017	The Royal Tutor	Kai von Glanzreich		
2017	The Silver Guardian	Silicon		
2017	Tsugumomo	Hiroshi		
2017	Kenka Bancho Otome: Girl Beats Boys	Sakuya		
2017	Sakura Quest	Tokichiro		
2017	My Hero Academia	Mustard, Moonfish	Season 2	
2017	Tsukigakirei	Hira		
2017	Star Blazers: Space Battleship Yamato 2199	Basiv Vandevel, Mitsuru Yoshida		
2017	Mobile Suit Gundam SEED	Yzak	Also SEED Destiny, NYAV Post dub	
2017	Jūni Taisen: Zodiac War	Tsugi (Rat)		
2017	Black Clover	Revchi		
2017	Code: Realize ~Guardian of Rebirth~	Nemo		
2017	King's Game The Animation	Kawakami		
2017–2019	Dragon Ball Super	Monaka, Borareta, Narirama, Frieza		
2017–2026	The Saga of Tanya the Evil	Matheus Johan Weiss		
2018	Hakata Tonkotsu Ramens	Hayashi (Lin)		
2018	Tokyo Ghoul:re	Ginshi Shirazu		
2018	Legend of the Galactic Heroes: Die Neue These	Adalbert von Fahrenheit		
2018	Overlord	Unlai	Season 3	
2018	Free! Dive in the Future	Albert		
2018	Kakuriyo -Bed & Breakfast for Spirits-	Ranmaru		
2018	The Master of Ragnarok & Blesser of Einherjar	Stein, STEINÞÓR		
2018	Lord of Vermilion: The Crimson King	Kaburagi Kark		
2018	B't X Neo	Hokuto		
2018	Saint Seiya: The Lost Canvas	Alone		
2018	UQ Holder!	Fate Averruncus		
2018	Ulysses: Jeanne d'Arc and the Alchemist Knight	Alencon		
2018	A Certain Magical Index III	Teitoku Kakine	Season 3 of series	
2018	Golden Kamuy	Koito		
2018	Double Decker! Doug & Kirill	Milla		
2018	Hitorijime My Hero	Asaya Hasekura		
2018	Goblin Slayer	Light Warrior		
2018–present	That Time I Got Reincarnated as a Slime	Diablo		
2019	Meiji Tokyo Renka	Shunso Hishida		
2019	Kono Oto Tomare! Sounds of Life	Chika Kudo	Main role	
2019	Wise Man's Grandchild	Shin	Lead role	
2019	Isekai Quartet	Matheus Johan Weiss		
2019	Sarazanmai	Mabu Akutsu		
2019	Kochoki	Oda Nobunaga	Lead role	
2019	Special 7: Special Crime Investigation Unit	Black Pearl		
2019	Stand My Heroes: Piece of Truth	Takaomi Hiyama		
2019	Actors: Songs Connection	Mike		
2020	A Certain Scientific Railgun T	Teitoku Kakine	Season 3 of series	
2020	Beastars	Kai, Roger, Parite Headmaster		
2020	Hatena Illusion	Mamoru		
2020	Id: Invaded	Nishimura		
2020	Kakushigoto	Mario		
2020	Super HxEros	Jō Anno		
2020	Gleipnir	Ikeuchi	Assistant ADR Director	
2020	Our Last Crusade or the Rise of a New World	Salinger		
2021	Kuroko's Basketball	Shintaro Midorima		
2021	SK8 the Infinity	Cherry Blossom		
2021	Suppose a Kid From the Last Dungeon Boonies Moved to a Starter Town?		ADR Director	
2021	Shachibato! President, It's Time for Battle!	Rivar		
2021	Shironeko Project Zero Chronicle	Skeers		
2021	Skate-Leading Stars	Shinozaki		
2021	Dragon Goes House-Hunting	Huey		
2021	Full Dive		ADR Director	
2021	How a Realist Hero Rebuilt the Kingdom	Ludwig Arcs		
2021	A3! Season Spring & Summer	Banri	Also Autumn & Winter	
2021	Ikebukuro West Gate Park	Reiichirou		
2021	Sonny Boy	Asakaze		
2021	Hortensia Saga	Alexis Vall d'Hebron		
2021	Platinum End	Revel		
2021	Beyblade Burst Surge	Lain Valhalla		
2022	Blue Period	Yotasuke Takahashi		
2022	Odd Taxi	Ayumu Goriki		
2022	The Prince of Tennis	Kazuya Tokugawa		
2022	Fate/Grand Carnival	Dumuzid, Fergus mac Róich		
2022	Pokémon: Hisuian Snow	Additional voices		
2022	Haikyu!!	Osamu Miya		
2022	Orient	Naotora		
2022	Yashahime: Princess Half-Demon	Mayonaka / Mahiruma		
2023	Trigun Stampede	Legato Bluesummers		
2023	Pokémon Horizons: The Series	Amethio, Quaxly		
2023–2026	Bleach: Thousand-Year Blood War	Askin Nakk Le Vaar		
2024	The Grimm Variations	Jacob Grimm, Masataka Ichijo		
2024	Cherry Magic! Thirty Years of Virginity Can Make You a Wizard?!	Adachi		
2024	Oshi no Ko	Taiki Himekawa	Season 2	
2025	Solo Leveling: Arise from the Shadow	Barca	Season 2 of series	
2025	Pokémon Horizons – The Search for Laqua	Clodsire	Season 2 of series	
2025	Sakamoto Days	Kashima, Joichiro Kaji		
2025	Blue Box	Kengo Haryū		
2026	Steel Ball Run: JoJo's Bizarre Adventure	Johnny Joestar		
2026	The Elusive Samurai	Uesugi Noriaki		

=== Films ===
List of voice performances in films
Year	Title	Role	Notes	Source
2017	One Piece Film: Gold	Tanaka		
2019	Dragon Ball Super: Broly	Moroko		
2019	One Piece: Stampede	Douglas Bullet		
2021	Evangelion: 1.11 You Are (Not) Alone	Kaworu Nagisa	Prime Video dub	
2021	Evangelion: 2.22 You Can (Not) Advance	Kaworu Nagisa	Prime Video dub	
2021	Evangelion: 3.33 You Can (Not) Redo	Kaworu Nagisa	Prime Video dub	
2021	Evangelion: 3.0+1.0 Thrice Upon a Time	Kaworu Nagisa		
2021	The Seven Deadly Sins: Cursed by Light	Dubs		
2021	Kuroko's Basketball The Movie: Last Game	Shintaro Midorima		
2025	The Rose of Versailles	Florian de Gerodelle	Netflix dub	
2025	Virgin Punk: Clockwork Girl	Lewis Gaudi		
TBA	Fist of the North Star: Legend of Raoh: Chapter of Fierce Fight	Raoh (Young)	ADR Director	

=== Video games ===
List of voice performances in video games
Year	Title	Role	Notes	Source
2017	Regalia: Of Men and Monarchs	Walter Crucey, additional voices		
2018	Dragon Ball FighterZ	Frieza		
2018	Paladins	Koga		
2019	YIIK: A Postmodern RPG	Krow Named Marlene		
2019	Borderlands 3	Titus		
2020	Dragon Ball Z: Kakarot	Frieza, Smitty		
2020	Pokémon Masters EX	N		
2021	Monster Hunter Rise	Hamon, Oboro		
2021	Cris Tales	JKR-721		
2021	Final Fantasy VII Remake	Weiss the Immaculate		
2021	Shin Megami Tensei V	Aogami		
2021	Tales of Luminaria	Gaspard Herbet		
2021	Mobile Legends: Bang Bang	Aamon		
2022	Gunvolt Chronicles: Luminous Avenger iX 2	Autochrome		
2022	Relayer	Observer, additional voices		
2022	Chocobo GP	Necroshell		
2022	Phantom Breaker: Omnia	Ende		
2022	Cookie Run: Kingdom	Milk Cookie		
2022	Soul Hackers 2	Madam Ginko		
2022	World of Warcraft	Okir, Norukk, Somnikus		
2023	Octopath Traveler II	Akala		
2023	The Legend of Heroes: Trails into Reverie	Swin Abel, Soldiers & Citizens of Zemuria		
2023	Honkai: Star Rail	Blade		
2023	Loop8: Summer of Gods	Sachi Hori, additional voices		
2023	Genshin Impact	Lyney		
2023	Anonymous;Code	Kaoru Samezu		
2024	Persona 3 Reload	Takaya Sakaki		
2024	Unicorn Overlord	Auch		
2024	Sand Land	Additional voices		
2024	Card-en-Ciel	Eduardo, Neto, Dior, Gasol, Autochrome		
2025	Phantom Brave: The Lost Hero	Rouen		
2025	The Legend of Heroes: Trails Through Daybreak II	Swin Abel		
2025	Yakuza 0 Director's Cut	Additional voices		
2025	Raidou Remastered: The Mystery of the Soulless Army	Kenzo Satake		
2025	Story of Seasons: Grand Bazaar	Lloyd, additional voices		
2025	Pac-Man World 2 Re-Pac	Spooky		
2026	Yakuza Kiwami 3 & Dark Ties	Yoshitaka Mine		
2026	Fire Emblem: Fortune's Weave	Sirocco		

=== Animated series ===
- RWBY (2017–18; 2023), Leonardo Lionheart

=== Web series ===
- Red vs. Blue (2020), Diesel
