= Special 7: Special Crime Investigation Unit =

Japanese anime television series

- Special 7: Special Crime Investigation Unit key visual

警視庁 特務部 特殊凶悪犯対策室 第七課 -トクナナ- (Keishichou Tokumu-bu Tokushu Kyouaku-han Taisaku-Shitsu Dai-Nana-ka -Tokunana-)
- Genre: Crime
- Anime television series
- Directed by: Takayuki Kuriyama (chief); Harume Kosaka
- Written by: Yuichiro Higashide
- Music by: Ryō Takahashi
- Studio: ANIMA&CO.
- Licensed by: Crunchyroll
- Original network: AT-X, Tokyo MX, SUN, TVA, BS Fuji
- Original run: October 6, 2019 – December 29, 2019
- Episodes: 12

Special 7: Special Crime Investigation Unit (Japanese: 警視庁 特務部 特殊凶悪犯対策室 第七課 -トクナナ-, Hepburn: Keishichou Tokumu-bu Tokushu Kyouaku-han Taisaku-Shitsu Dai-Nana-ka -Tokunana-; lit. "Metropolitan Police Department Special Division Heinous Crime Task Force 7th Unit: Tokunana") is an original Japanese anime television series produced by ANIMA&CO that aired from October to December 2019.

== Characters ==
Seiji "Rookie" Nanatsuki (七月 清司, Nanatsuki Seiji)
Voiced by: Hiro Shimono (Japanese); Matt Shipman (English)
Nine years ago, he survived a terrorist attack on an airport because a detective delayed the terrorists and let him escape. He wished to be like him and so became a detective. He seems to have some type of magical ability that he acquired at the airport bombing that he is not fully aware of yet.
Shiori "Charisma" Ichinose (一ノ瀬 栞, Ichinose Shiori)
Voiced by: Kenjiro Tsuda (Japanese); Brandon Potter (English)
A withdrawn human member of the team, he is a master at making suspects talk by using his innate ability to see all the possibilities and conclude which is the most probable. His marksman skills are bizarre. If he is taking his time and aims at his target, he misses every time, but if he closes his eyes or just fires randomly, he can make impossible shots.
Kujaku "Analyzer" Nijo (二条 クジャク, Nijō Kujaku)
Voiced by: Tatsuhisa Suzuki (Japanese); David Matranga (English)
A highly-intelligent elf with a large network of connections. He lost his older brother in the same terrorist attack that Seiji Nanatsuki was injured in. That detective was the one that saved Seiji.
Akane "Samurai" Shikisai (四季彩 紅音, Shikisai Akane)
Voiced by: Yūko Kaida (Japanese); Monica Rial (English)
A vampire and master swordswoman. She lives in an apartment with her husband and their dog.
Bellemer "Ninja" Cinq (ベルメール・サンク, Berumēru Sanku)
Voiced by: Ari Ozawa (Japanese); Sarah Wiedenheft (English)
She is a homonculus girl with blonde hair who used drones to deliver explosives and blow up Rainbow Bridge to stop an armored car.
Rokusuke "Sniper" Endo (遠藤 六輔, Endō Rokusuke)
Voiced by: Kenji Nomura (Japanese); Chris Rager (English)
Sometimes called Gramps, he is a dwarf who wears an eyepatch over his left eye but remains a master sniper. His ex-wife is an elf. He lives with his adult daughter.
Sakon Zeroemon "Boss" Kiryuin (桐生院左近零衛門, Kiryūin Sakon Zeroemon)
Voiced by: Toshiyuki Morikawa (Japanese); Eric Vale (English)
In charge of Special Unit 7 he directs and watches over the team from base, but is shown to be quite quirky, especially the way he wears bow ties. He has a familiar that is a small white dragon with which he shares a psychic connection. He is able to communicate with his team, sees what it sees, and feels what it feels. He is a magic user that can cast spells through this familiar.
Warlock (ウォーロック, Wōrokku)
Voiced by: Hiroaki Hirata (Japanese); Mark Stoddard (English)
The leader of nine. He is a magic user.
Ruka Mizuka (三潴 ルカ, Mizuma Ruka)
Voiced by: Yoshitsugu Matsuoka (Japanese); Josh Bangle (English)
Black Pearl (黒真珠, Kuroshinju)
Voiced by: Nobunaga Shimazaki (Japanese); Daman Mills (English)

== Production and release ==
The original anime television series was announced on March 20, 2019. The series was directed by Harume Kosaka and written by Yuichiro Higashide, with Takayuki Kuriyama serving as chief director, and Hiroya Iijima adapting the original character designs by Nanae Chrono. Ryō Takahashi composed the series' music. ANIMA&CO. animated the series. It aired from October 6 to December 29, 2019, on AT-X, Tokyo MX, SUN, TVA, and BS Fuji. Oldcodex performed the series' opening theme song "Take On Fever", while SCREEN mode performed the series' ending theme song "One Wish". Funimation licensed the series for a SimulDub.

No.	Title	Original release date
1	"One Brings Bad Omens, Seven Brings Good Luck"; Transliteration: "Ichi wa kyōchō wo, Nana wa koūn wo" (Japanese: 一は凶兆を、七は幸運を)	October 6, 2019
2	"The Two Investigate"; Transliteration: "Sōsasuru ni futari" (Japanese: 捜査する二人)	October 13, 2019
3	"The Threefold Trap"; Transliteration: "Sanjū no Wana" (Japanese: 三重の罠)	October 20, 2019
4	"Family of Four"; Transliteration: "Yonnin no Kazoku" (Japanese: 四人の家族)	October 27, 2019
5	"The Fifth Seal"; Transliteration: "Daigo no Fūin" (Japanese: 第五の封印)	November 3, 2019
6	"The Six-Minute Battle to the Death"; Transliteration: "Rokubunma no Shitō" (Japanese: 六分間の死闘)	November 10, 2019
7	"The Seventh Day is for Idleness"; Transliteration: "Nanahime wa damin" (Japanese: 七日目は惰眠)	November 17, 2019
8	"The Eight-Foot Escape Route"; Transliteration: "Hachifīto no Nigemichi" (Japanese: 八フィートの逃げ道)	November 24, 2019
8.5	"Seiji Nanatsuki's Running Report"; Transliteration: "Nanatsuki Seiji no Kakenukeru katsudō hōkokusho" (Japanese: 七月清司の駆け抜ける活動報告書)	December 1, 2019
9	"Nine Years' Rage"; Transliteration: "Kyūnen no Fundo" (Japanese: 九年の憤怒)	December 8, 2019
10	"The Tenth Dragon"; Transliteration: "Jūbanme no Ryū" (Japanese: 十番目の竜)	December 15, 2019
11	"The Eleven O'Clock War"; Transliteration: "Jū-ichiji no Sensō" (Japanese: 十一時の戦争)	December 22, 2019
12	"From Zero to Seven"; Transliteration: "Zero kara Nana e" (Japanese: ゼロからナナへ)	December 29, 2019

== Reception ==
Anime News Network had three editors review the first episode of the anime: Theron Martin was intrigued by the "action-oriented focus" the show would take with its supernatural mystery story but found it "fairly standard" with its beginning and cast of characters, concluding that: "Though the production tries to spruce things up with a jazzy musical score, this series doesn't do enough in its visuals, character design, or storytelling to distinguish itself yet. It's not bad, but based on first episode comparison alone, I can't see this one being the sleeper success that Midnight Occult Civil Servants was." Rebecca Silverman felt it didn't explore more with its genre and into its main character Seiji but said that: "I think this has potential in the supernatural cop genre, and if it doesn't take too long to reveal more about the story's world, I think it could be worthwhile." The third reviewer, Nick Creamer, praised the show for having "strong narrative fundamentals" during its introduction and the direction for going through "coherent dramatic setpieces" with "snappy pacing" and "clear narrative stakes", concluding that: "All in all, Special 7 counts as a very strong entry in a fairly crowded genre. Seiji and Shiori are pretty classic rookie and veteran archetypes, but this episode was able to sell their individuality through its convincing dialogue, and kept its tension high from start to finish. If you're looking for a police drama this season, Special 7 seems like an excellent choice."
