= Skate-Leading Stars =

Japanese anime television series

- Skate-Leading☆Stars
- Promotional poster

スケートリーディング☆スターズ (Sukēto Rīdingu☆Sutāzu)
- Genre: Sports (figure skating)
- Created by: Gorō Taniguchi; Bandai Namco Arts; J.C.Staff
- Manga
- Written by: Chiaki Nagaoka
- Illustrated by: Sumika Sumio
- Published by: Square Enix
- Magazine: Monthly G Fantasy
- Original run: December 18, 2020 – March 18, 2022
- Volumes: 2
- Anime television series
- Directed by: Gorō Taniguchi (chief); Toshinori Fukushima
- Written by: Noboru Kimura
- Music by: Ryō Takahashi
- Studio: J.C.Staff
- Licensed by: Crunchyroll (Note: In North America through Crunchyroll, LLC (formerly known as Funimation), in the United Kingdom through Crunchyroll UK and Ireland (formerly known as Manga Entertainment) and in Australia through Madman Anime); SEA: Medialink
- Original network: Tokyo MX, BS11, MBS, AT-X
- Original run: January 10, 2021 – March 28, 2021
- Episodes: 12
- icon

Skate-Leading☆Stars (Japanese: スケートリーディング☆スターズ, Hepburn: Sukēto Rīdingu☆Sutāzu) is an original Japanese anime television series produced by J.C.Staff, created by Gorō Taniguchi, and directed by Toshinori Fukushima. The series aired from January 10 to March 28, 2021.

== Plot ==
The series will follow a group of high school boys who participate in a fictional type of competitive figure skating known as "skate-leading". After suffering a humiliating loss to his (unrequited) rival, Maeshima Kensei swears off figure skating at the young age of 11. Fast-forward five years, and he's going nowhere in school or in life, sought after by all manner of sports teams but committed to none—until he learns his former not-rival now-skating-legend Shinozaki Reo has switched from singles skating to the new team-oriented skating style of 'Skate Leading'. He then with help of Shinozaki's half-brother Hayato Sasugai, who holds enmity towards Shinozaki, and members of skate leading club of Ionodai High School joins the competition against Shinozaki.

== Characters ==
=== Ionodai High School ===
Kensei Maeshima (前島絢晴, Maeshima Kensei)
Voiced by: Yuma Uchida (Japanese); Stephen Fu, Steph Garrett (young) (English)
Hayato Sasugai (流石井隼人, Sasugai Hayato)
Voiced by: Makoto Furukawa (Japanese); Jack Reeder (English)
Tomoyuki Kubota (窪田智之, Kubota Tomoyuki)
Voiced by: Gen Satō (Japanese); Khoi Dao (English)
Izumi Himekawa (姫川泉澄, Himekawa Izumi)
Voiced by: Yūichirō Umehara (Japanese); Christopher Wehkamp (English)
Akimitsu Mochizuki (望月暁光, Mochizuki Akimitsu)
Voiced by: Reiou Tsuchida (Japanese); Y. Chang (English)
Sota Jonouchi (城ノ内颯太, Jōnouchi Sōta)
Voiced by: Shōya Chiba (Japanese); Ricco Fajardo (English)
Shotaro Terauchi (寺内正太郎, Terauchi Shōtarō)
Voiced by: Satoshi Hino (Japanese); Ian Sinclair (English)
Itsuki Kiriyama (桐山樹, Kiriyama Itsuki)
Voiced by: Tomoaki Maeno (Japanese); Keith Silverstein (English)
Yukimitsu Mochizuki (望月雪光, Mochizuki Yukimitsu)
Voiced by: Natsuki Hanae (Japanese); Meli Grant (English)

=== St Cavis Gakuen High School ===
Reo Shinozaki (篠崎怜鳳, Shinozaki Reo)
Voiced by: Hiroshi Kamiya (Japanese); Daman Mills, Molly Searcy (young) (English)
Toranosuke Kurayoshi (倉吉虎之助, Kurayoshi Toranosuke)
Voiced by: Kaito Takeda (Japanese); Aaron Michael (English)
Taiga Himuro (氷室泰冴, Himuro Taiga)
Voiced by: Yūki Ono (Japanese); J. Michael Tatum (English)

=== Yokohama Super Global High School ===
Noa Kuonji (久遠寺夢空, Kuonji Noa)
Voiced by: Sōma Saitō (Japanese); Kim Morton (English)

=== Chutei University Kamimaezu High School ===
Hajime Ishikawa (石川一, Ishikawa Hajime)
Voiced by: Hirofumi Nojima (Japanese); Seth Magill (English)
Susumu Ishikawa (石川二, Ishikawa Susumu)
Voiced by: Kenji Nojima (Japanese); Bryson Baugus (English)

== Media ==
=== Manga ===
In March 2020, a manga adaption by Chiaki Nagaoka with art by Sumika Sumio was announced to run in Monthly G Fantasy. It was serialized from December 18, 2020, to March 18, 2022. Two tankōbon volumes were released from March 27, 2021, to May 27, 2022.

=== Anime ===
On December 1, 2019, J.C.Staff announced that they are producing a new original anime television series directed by Gorō Taniguchi, with Toboso Yana handling original character designs. The series is directed by Toshinori Fukushima, with Gorō Taniguchi serving as chief director. Noboru Kimura is writing the scripts, Yoko Ito is designing the characters, and Ryō Takahashi is composing the series' music. The series was originally set to premiere in July 2020, but it was delayed to January 2021 due to the COVID-19 pandemic. The series aired from January 10 to March 28, 2021. The opening theme song is "Chase the core" performed by Takao Sakuma (佐久間貴生, Sakuma Takao), and the ending theme song is "Jump" performed by Shūgo Nakamura. Funimation licensed the series and started streaming it on December 27, 2020, two weeks before its Japanese broadcast, in North America and the British Isles, in Europe through Wakanim, and in Australia and New Zealand through AnimeLab. On March 13, 2021, Funimation announced the series would receive an English dub, with the first episode premiering the next day.

=== Episodes ===
No.	Title	Directed by (Note: Information is taken from the ending credits of each episode.)	Written by	Original release date (Note: Every episode was pre-released on Funimation two weeks before its original air date.)
1	"Pact"; Transliteration: "Meiyaku" (Japanese: 盟約)	Yoshiyuki Nogami	Noboru Kimura	January 10, 2021
2	"Break"; Transliteration: "Buranku" (Japanese: ブランク)	Kazunobu Shimizu	Noboru Kimura	January 17, 2021
3	"Self-Centered"; Transliteration: "Jiko-chū" (Japanese: 自己中)	Yoshiyuki Nogami	Noboru Kimura	January 24, 2021
4	"Inspiration"; Transliteration: "Shokuhatsu" (Japanese: 触発)	Fumihiro Ueno; Toshinori Fukushima	Noboru Kimura	January 31, 2021
5	"Bonds"; Transliteration: "Kizuna" (Japanese: 絆)	Shigeki Awai	Noboru Kimura	February 7, 2021
6	"Indecision"; Transliteration: "Shunjun" (Japanese: 逡巡)	Aya Kobayashi	Noboru Kimura	February 14, 2021
7	"Resolve"; Transliteration: "Ketsudan" (Japanese: 決断)	Toshihiro Maeya	Noboru Kimura	February 21, 2021
8	"Champions"; Transliteration: "Ōja" (Japanese: 王者)	Yoshiyuki Nogami	Noboru Kimura	February 28, 2021
9	"One Lead"; Transliteration: "Wan Rīdo" (Japanese: ワンリード)	Noriaki Akitaya	Noboru Kimura	March 7, 2021
10	"Finals"; Transliteration: "Fainaru" (Japanese: ファイナル)	Shigeki Awai	Noboru Kimura	March 14, 2021
11	"Perfect"; Transliteration: "Kanzen" (Japanese: 完全)	Aya Kobayashi	Noboru Kimura	March 21, 2021
12	"Sworn Friends"; Transliteration: "Meiyū" (Japanese: 盟友)	Yoshiyuki Nogami	Noboru Kimura	March 28, 2021
