= Deux Frères =

Deux Frères may refer to:

- French ship Deux Frères, an 80-gun ship of the line of the French Navy
- Deux Freres (1798 ship), a tartane that the French Navy requisitioned in 1798, that the Royal Navy captured in 1799, and that was lost that same year in a gale.
- Deux frères (TV series) (fr), a controversial 1999 Québec TV series
- Deux frères (album), an album by French rap duo PNL
- Les Deux Frères, a mountain in Kerguelen, French Southern and Antarctic Lands

== See also ==
- Two Brothers (disambiguation)
