= Two Car =

Japanese anime television series

- Key Visual

つうかあ (Tsūkaa)
- Genre: Sports (Sidecar racing)
- Manga

Two Car Everyday
- Written by: Eromane
- Published by: Media Factory
- Magazine: Monthly Comic Alive
- Original run: September 9, 2017 – January 27, 2018
- Volumes: 1
- Manga
- Written by: Shinome Shinohara
- Published by: Kadokawa
- Imprint: MF Comics
- Magazine: ComicWalker
- Original run: October 7, 2017 – May 20, 2018
- Volumes: 2
- Anime television series
- Directed by: Masafumi Tamura
- Produced by: Oshi Yoshinuma; Youichi Sekine; Fuminori Yamazaki; Mika Shimizu; Shinji Oomori; Souji Miyagi; Hideo Momota; Junichirou Tamura; Yoshiyuki Shioya; Kaori Kimura; Akinobu Terabe
- Written by: Katsuhiko Takayama
- Music by: Ryō Takahashi
- Studio: Silver Link
- Licensed by: Crunchyroll
- Original network: AT-X, Tokyo MX, Sun TV, KBS, BS Fuji
- English network: SEA: Animax Asia
- Original run: October 7, 2017 – December 23, 2017
- Episodes: 12

Two Car (つうかあ, Tsūkaa), also called Two Car: Racing Sidecar, is a Japanese anime television series about motorcycle sidecar racing, created by Silver Link as their 10th anniversary project. It aired from October 7 to December 23, 2017.

== Plot ==
The story follows Yuri Miyata and Megumi Meguro, a pair of sidecar racing team members living on Miyake Island, where they take on other rival motorcycle sidecar teams.

== Characters ==
Yuri Miyata (宮田 ゆり, Miyata Yuri)
Voiced by: Aoi Koga
Megumi Meguro (目黒 めぐみ, Meguro Megumi)
Voiced by: Aimi Tanaka
Mutsuki Shimazu (島津 むつき, Shimazu Mutsuki)
Voiced by: Ayaka Saito
Ai Makita (蒔田 あい, Makita Ai)
Voiced by: Sora Tokui
Nene Itagaki (板垣 ねね, Itagaki Nene)
Voiced by: Mana Hirata
Hibari Takada (高田 ひばり, Takada Hibari)
Voiced by: Sakura Nakamura
Tsugumi Nakajima (中島 つぐみ, Nakajima Tsugumi)
Voiced by: Maria Naganawa
Chiyuki Shiohara (塩原 ちゆき, Shiohara Chiyuki)
Voiced by: Sarah Emi Bridcutt
Misaki Nagai (永井 みさき, Nagai Misaki)
Voiced by: Haruka Tomatsu
Izumi Murata (村田 いずみ, Murata Izumi)
Voiced by: Ayaka Nanase
Nagisa Suzuki (鈴木 なぎさ, Suzuki Nagisa)
Voiced by: Misato Fukuen
Maria Shishido (宍戸 まりあ, Shishido Maria)
Voiced by: Aya Suzaki
Yuria Shishido (宍戸 ゆりあ, Shishido Yuria)
Voiced by: Aya Suzaki
Kanae Kawamata (川真田 かなえ, Kawamata Kanae)
Voiced by: Ayaka Shimizu
Tamae Kuribayashi (栗林 たまえ, Kuribayashi Tamae)
Voiced by: Arisa Morishima
Mao Katakura (片倉 まお, Katakura Mao)
Voiced by: Arisa Shida
Hitomi Iseki (井関 ひとみ, Iseki Hitomi)
Voiced by: Ayahi Takagaki
Arisu Amano (天野 ありす, Amano Arisu)
Voiced by: Maya Yoshioka
Kurosu Itō (伊藤 くろす, Itō Kurosu)
Voiced by: Yumiri Hanamori
Tanahashi (棚橋)
Voiced by: Shin-ichiro Miki
Yōko Higurashi (日暮 洋子, Higurashi Yōko)
Voiced by: Emiko Takeuchi
Hatsune Wada (和田 はつね, Wada Hatsune)
Voiced by: Hitomi Nabatame
Betty and Tina Birchall (ベティとティナ・バーチャル, Beti to Tina Bācharu)
Voiced by: Ami Koshimizu (Betty), Sakura Nakamura (Tina)

Siblings from the Isle of Man's racing circuit.

== Media ==
=== Manga ===
A spin-off manga titled Two Car Everyday, written by dōjinshi artist Eromane, was serialized in Media Factory's Monthly Comic Alive from September 9, 2017, to January 27, 2018. A main manga adaptation was serialized in Kadokawa's ComicWalker website from October 2017 to May 2018.

==== Two Car Everyday ====
No.	Release date	ISBN
1	February 23, 2018	978-4-04-069798-7

==== Two Car ====
No.	Release date	ISBN
1	December 13, 2017	978-4-04-069650-8
2	June 23, 2018	978-4-04-069882-3

=== Anime ===
Nikoichi was credited for the original work. Masafumi Tamura directed the anime at Silver Link. Katsuhiko Takayama supervised and wrote the series scripts. Tiv drafted the original character design concepts, and Yuki Sawairi adapted those designs for animation. Sphere performed the opening theme "Heart to Heart", while Void_Chords performed the ending theme "Angelica Wind" alongside Aoi Koga & Aimi Tanaka. Crunchyroll streamed the series.

No.	Title	Original release date
1	"Exhibition"	October 7, 2017
2	"Shakedown"	October 14, 2017
3	"Practise"	October 21, 2017
4	"Swap Meet"	October 28, 2017
5	"Reverse Grid"	November 4, 2017
6	"Dual Purpose"	November 11, 2017
7	"Side by Side"	November 18, 2017
8	"Engage"	November 25, 2017
9	"Mad Saturday"	December 2, 2017
10	"Replay Log Data"	December 9, 2017
11	"Blue Flag"	December 16, 2017
12	"Ladies, Start Your Engines!"	December 23, 2017

== Reception ==
=== Previews ===
Anime News Network had four editors review the first episode of the anime: Rebecca Silverman gave praise to the episode for its luscious backgrounds and building interest in the sport of sidecar racing; Theron Martin saw intrigue in the Yuri and Megumi relationship possibly making for an interesting watch but was unsure of its place in the fall season schedule; James Beckett praised the animation of the racing sequences and the added use of CG to them, but was critical of the two main leads being characterized and motivated over a romance with their unseen coach. The fourth reviewer, Nick Creamer, felt the show lacked a "real sense of drama or urgency" in both its racing scenes and character interactions, concluding that it "isn't a terrible show in any way, it also doesn't present any convincing reasons to keep watching. This one's an easy skip."

=== Series ===
Stig Høgset, writing for THEM Anime Reviews, praised the sidecar racing scenes for having beautiful scenery that complement the CG vehicles during the high-octane moments, the sound editing to accentuate driving the courses and the sidecar technical aspects but was critical of the cast of racing teams acting as bearers for the series' unfulfilling comedic and dramatic story elements, concluding with, "Come for the bikes, because the drama and the comedy is definitely not up to speed."

== See also ==
- Isle of Man Sidecar TT racing
