= Bhai =

Bhai (meaning "brother" in Indic languages) may refer to:

- Bhai (1997 film), an Indian Hindi-language action film by Deepak S. Shivdasani
- Bhai (2013 film), an Indian Telugu-language action film by Veerabhadram
- Bhai: Vyakti Ki Valli, a 2019 Indian Marathi-language film by Mahesh Manjrekar
  - Bhai: Vyakti Ki Valli 2, the 2019 sequel by Mahesh Manjrekar
- Bhai (TV series), a Pakistani drama serial
- Bhai (writer) (1935–2018), Indo-Surinamese poet
- Bhai or Bhaijaan, nicknames of Indian film actor Salman Khan (born 1965)
  - Bhaijaan: Kisi Ka Bhai Kisi Ki Jaan, a 2023 Indian Hindi-language film by Farhad Samji, starring Salman Khan
- Bhai (Sikhism), Sikh title and tradition

== See also ==
- Bhai Bhai (disambiguation)
- Do Bhai (disambiguation)
- Munna Bhai (disambiguation)
- Bhai Jaan, a 1945 Indian film
- Bhaiya Dooj, a festival in India celebrating brothers
- Bhaiyaa, a 1965 Indian Hindi-language film
- Bhaiyya, Hindi title for the 2024 Indian Telugu-language film Yevadu
- Bhaiyya Ji, a 2024 Indian Hindi-language film
- Bhaiyya Bhaiyya, a 2014 Indian Malayalam-language film
- Bhaiaji Superhit, a 2018 Indian Bhojuri-language film
- Bhaiji, a fictional villain in the 1992 Indian film Balwaan
- Bhaiyalal Bhotmange, victim of the 2006 Khairlanji massacre in Maharashtra, India
- Bhaiyaji Dani or Prabhakar Balwant Dani, an Indian Rashtriya Swayamsevak Sangh member
- Bhaiyya Ganpatrao, an Indian classical singer
- Bhaiyyaji Joshi, an Indian politician
- Bhaiya Raja or Ashok Veer Vikram Singh, an Indian politician
- Bhaiyalal Rajwade, an Indian politician
