= Bhai Bhai =

Bhai Bhai (lit. 'Brother Brother') may refer to:

- Bhai-Bhai (1956 Hindi film), 1956 Indian film
- Bhai Bhai (1956 Odia film), 1956 Indian film
- Bhai-Bhai (1970 film), 1970 Indian Hindi-language film
- Bhai Bhai (1997 film), 1997 Indian Hindi-language action film

== See also ==
- Bhai (disambiguation)
- Bhai Bhaiya Aur Brother, a 2012 Indian TV series
