= Do Bhai =

Do Bhai (lit. 'Two Brothers' in Hindi) may refer to:

- Do Bhai (1947 film), 1947 Indian film
- Do Bhai (1969 film), 1969 Indian film

== See also ==
- Two Brothers (disambiguation)
- Bhai (disambiguation)
