= Ryo Takahashi (musician) =

Japanese musician (born 1985)

Ryo Takahashi 高橋諒
- Also known as: Void_Chords
- Born: November 1, 1985 (age 40)
- Genres: Film score; Soundtrack
- Occupations: Composer; Arranger
- Instruments: Guitar
- Years active: 2008–present
- Label: Japan Composers and Arrangers Association

Ryo Takahashi (Japanese: 高橋諒, Hepburn: Takahashi Ryō; born November 1, 1985) is a Japanese musician and composer. Growing up, Takahashi was a fan of American rock band the Ventures, which inspired him to take a musical career, and university inspired him to become a composer, which he was given his first lead role in with Please Tell Me! Galko-chan in 2016. Since 2016, he has done music composition for various series, such as ACCA: 13-Territory Inspection Dept. and SK8 the Infinity. Under the name Void_Chords, he has performed theme songs for Two Car, Princess Principal, and Arifureta: From Commonplace to World's Strongest.

== Biography ==
Ryo Takahashi was born on November 1, 1985. Growing up, Takahashi was a fan of American rock band the Ventures, which would inspire him to pursue a musical career. While in university, Takahashi studied musical composition, which would influence him to become a composer. In 2016, he made his debut as lead composer with the anime adaptation of Please Tell Me! Galko-chan.

In 2017, he composed the music for the anime adaptation of ACCA: 13-Territory Inspection Dept. and as Void_Chords the opening for Princess Principal. At the 2nd Crunchyroll Anime Awards, the former was nominated for Best Score and the latter for Best Opening.

== Works ==
=== TV series ===
- Please Tell Me! Galko-chan (2016) (composer)
- Regalia: The Three Sacred Stars (2016) (composer)
- ACCA: 13-Territory Inspection Dept. (2017) (composer)
- Princess Principal (2017) (opening theme performance) (Note: Credited as Void_Chords)
- Code: Realize − Guardian of Rebirth (2017) (composer)
- Classroom of the Elite (2017) (composer)
- Two Car (2017) (composer, ending theme performance)
- Citrus (2018) (composer)
- Arifureta: From Commonplace to World's Strongest (2019–2024) (composer, opening theme performance)
- Special 7: Special Crime Investigation Unit (2019) (composer)
- Argonavis from BanG Dream! (2020) (composer)
- Skate-Leading Stars (2021) (composer)
- SK8 the Infinity (2021) (composer)
- The Vampire Dies in No Time (2021–present) (composer)
- Tribe Nine (2022) (ending theme performance)
- Healer Girl (2022) (composer)
- RWBY: Ice Queendom (2022) (opening theme performance)
- Smile of the Arsnotoria the Animation (2022) (composer with Ken Itō)
- Ningen Fushin: Adventurers Who Don't Believe in Humanity Will Save the World (2023) (composer)
- High Card (2023) (composer)
- World Dai Star (2023) (composer with Kenichi Kuroda and Tatsuya Yano)
- Wind Breaker (2024) (composer)
- Backstabbed in a Backwater Dungeon (2025) (composer)
- Roll Over and Die (2026) (composer)

=== Films ===
- Sing a Bit of Harmony (2021) (composer)

=== Web series ===
- Dream Festival! (2016–2017) (composer with Ken Itō)
