= YIIK: A Postmodern RPG =

- Developer: Ackk Studios
- Publisher: Ysbryd Games
- Producer: Brian Kwek
- Designers: Brian Allanson; Andrew Allanson; Ian Bailey
- Programmer: Brian Allanson
- Artists: Brian Allanson; Brigid Allanson
- Writer: Andrew Allanson
- Composers: List: Andrew Allanson; Michael Kelly; Calum Bowen; Toby Fox; Hiroki Kikuta; Jose Alfaro; Tony Manfredonia; Chipocrite; Steve Lakawicz; Mika Maruyama; Ken "Coda" Snyder; Baiyon
- Engine: Unity
- Platforms: Windows, Mac, PlayStation 4, Nintendo Switch
- Release: January 17, 2019
- Genre: Role-playing
- Mode: Single-player

YIIK: A Postmodern RPG (Note: "YIIK" is pronounced "Y 2 K".) is a role-playing video game created by American indie developer Ackk Studios. The player controls a recent college graduate investigating the disappearance of a woman in his hometown in 1999. Accompanied by a group of friends, the player explores dungeons, solves puzzles, and encounters surreal enemies across alternate dimensions. Combat is turn-based and incorporates timed minigames for both attacks and defenses. The player’s choices influence dialogue and relationships with other characters. The game was released on January 17, 2019, for Microsoft Windows, Mac, PlayStation 4, and Nintendo Switch.

== Gameplay ==
YIIK is a 3D RPG. The player can control the characters in turn-based battles where normal everyday objects are used as weapons. The combat consists of turn-based moves with quick time events which can increase the damage of an attack or minimize the damage taken from an opponent. There are six dungeons that are filled with enemies, simple puzzles and traps. There are approximately twenty five hours of gameplay, and to completely finish the game it can take up to 36 and a half hours.

== Plot ==
On April 4, 1999, Alex Eagleston (Chris Niosi) returns to his hometown of Frankton, New Jersey, after earning his B.L.A. While running an errand, a cat steals his shopping list, luring him into a surreal, abandoned factory where he befriends Semi "Sammy" Pak (Kelley Nicole Dugan). In the factory elevator, Sammy is suddenly kidnapped by two otherworldly beings and vanishes.

The next day, Alex returns with neighbor Michael K. (Clifford Chapin), capturing photos of a "being made of stars". Uploading them to ONISM1999, Michael's pioneering social media site, leads them to Vella Wilde (Melanie Ehrlich), an arcade employee. She identifies the beings as "Soul Survivors", souls that have fled their realities to seek a physical form in others. Vella provides a phone number granting access the Mind Dungeon, a metaphysical space where she wields sound as a weapon using her keytar.

A mysterious message claims that the sender's sister vanished like Sammy, drawing the trio to Rory Mancer (Andrew Fayette). He leads them to the sewers, believing his sister Carrie's soul lingers there. Instead, they encounter an alternate Rory's Soul Survivor. Rory reveals Carrie's suicide and his glimpse of the "Soul Space", the space between realities, during a despair-induced out-of-body experience. After battling the Soul Survivor and a bizarre golden alpaca, a resentful Alex insensitively calls out Rory for his deceit, alienating him.

Alex has a recurring dream of a plastic woman. A Soul Survivor invades his home and leads him to a radio tower with an empty record jacket. Suspecting it must be broadcast, Alex searches for the record. The player's choice determines whether Alex reconciles with Rory. He befriends record store owner Claudio Unkrich (Anthony Sardinha) and his sister Chondra (Michaela Laws), whose missing brother Aaron's case mirrors Sammy's. After learning that Vella is the record's artist, they retrieve it from her Mind Dungeon and broadcast it. The plastic woman, the Essentia 2000 (also Ehrlich), awakens in an isolated van. Alex and Vella psychically witness her slay a pair of Soul Survivors, vowing to find her. Alex may optionally let Rory vent his depression.

Locating the van, Essentia pulls Alex into her Mind Dungeon, claiming she is a parallel Sammy and Vella. Sammy chose to leave her body for the Soul Space, and was taken by her transitioned soul fragments. Essentia's body was captured by Soul Survivors, and her soul entered Alex's house during Sammy's abduction. Touring parallel lives, Essentia reveals Alex as the destroyer of realities, foretelling the end of his own on New Year's. She urges escape to the Soul Space to save others, but Alex defies her to save his world.

Emerging days later, Alex rallies his friends to prepare for their reality's impending end. During Alex's time away, Michael had accessed the Soul Space and achieved an enlightened state named Proto-Michael. They train themselves in their Mind Dungeons for a month, and during this time, Rory may survive or commit suicide in a fit of misanthropy depending on Alex's treatment of him. On New Year's Eve, reality begins to collapse, and Alex's friends are supplanted by crude, amnesiac replications. At Times Square, a meteorite variant of Alex, Comet Alex, nears. Proto-Michael's re-emergence restores the group's memories, but their battle against Comet Alex proves futile, and reality is destroyed. Adrift in the Soul Space, Alex finds a floating rock inhabited by Alex variants who have abandoned their realities. On the rock's opposite side, Alex encounters variants of Proto-Alex, Comet Alex's pilot, planning on destroying another reality.

=== Endings ===
Alex can join Proto-Alex, in which case the game's credits rush by and close with a passive-aggressive message. If Alex declines, he instead trails Comet Alex, watching it destroy other realities. Alex eventually reaches a planet taking place in the present day. He recruits the player, claiming them to be another Alex variant, and variants of his friends from that reality to vanquish Proto-Alex. Proto-Alex, who is conjoined with Essentia, reveals her to be an Alex variant who had manipulated Alex in the hopes of eliminating Proto-Alex and usurping their collective soul, using Sammy as bait. Alex fails again, but is spurred by Roy, the protagonist of Ackk Studios' first video game Two Brothers. He and the player deactivate Essentia and Proto-Alex, and all Alexes merge into the player. If on New Year's Eve Alex reads an online message from the game's developer, Brian Allanson, confirming Essentia's duplicity, he can instead intern at Sammy's news studio. In the elevator, Alex reunites with Sammy, who addresses him as the player and urges him to abandon this reality and explore the Soul Space with her.

== Development ==
The game is built on the Unity game engine. It began development in 2013, with brothers Andrew and Brian Allanson creating a fully-featured prototype in 52 days for showcase at PAX East 2013. After seeing the game in action at the event, the publisher Ysbryd Games entered an agreement to publish YIIK: A Postmodern RPG.

Around this time, the Allansons' mother was diagnosed with cancer, which would later result in her death. This caused the team to rework parts of the game's plot, making an effort to "[have] a more 'humanistic' perspective" and "sand down some of the game’s more cynical edges." By the end of this period, nearly a quarter of the game had been remade, including a slight change of the game's ending.

A pre-release demo was released in June 2016 on Microsoft Windows and MacOS.

In 2020, Ackk Studios announced multiple free updates for the game that would improve the game's combat mechanics while adding additional quality of life features. New content for its story would also be added through these updates under the titles of "Deviation Perspectives". The first update was released for PC in January 2021 and included the improved combat system as well as a reimagined Golden Alpaca (D.C. Douglas) boss battle as the first major change.

The second update, dubbed YIIK I.V, was released on December 2, 2024. Changes include a new combat system that removes the rhythm minigames and introduces a new mechanic in the form of cards that can be equipped and used in battle, an expanded story introducing new characters and locations as well a redesigned Mind Dungeon. A demo for the update, known as YIIK Nameless Psychosis was released on April 4, 2024.

== Reception ==
Reception

Aggregate scores
Aggregator	Score
Metacritic	(PC) 64/100 (NS) 63/100 (PS4) 59/100
OpenCritic	60/100; 28% Critics Recommend

Review scores
Publication	Score
Destructoid	(NS) 5.5/10
GameRevolution	(PC) 4/5
GameSpot	(PS4) 5/10
Hardcore Gamer	(NS) 4/5
IGN	(PC) 7/10
Nintendo Life	(NS) 8/10
Nintendo World Report	(NS) 8.5/10
Push Square	(PS4) 5/10
RPGamer	(PC) 4/5
RPGFan	(PC) 78%

YIIK: A Postmodern RPG received "mixed or average reviews" on all versions according to review aggregator Metacritic.

Reviewers had mixed reactions to the game's combat; while the presentation and variety of the attacks was commended, the steep learning curve for timing the attacks, clunky input response and lack of power balance were said to result in slow-paced battles. (Note: Attributed to multiple references:) Derek Heemsbergen of RPGFan found the controls to be universally "slippery". Jason Faulkner of GameRevolution appreciated the absence of random encounters, which allows the player to choose when to engage in combat. Reactions to the leveling system were generally lukewarm; reviewers summarized the system as initially novel, but ultimately tedious and obtuse. Neal Ronaghan of Nintendo World Report found the puzzles to be ingenious and enjoyable. Eric Bailey of Nintendo Life, while determining the puzzles to never be random or unfair, experienced occasional frustration from the "real lateral-thinking" challenges. Cian Maher of GameSpot acknowledged that the early puzzles were enjoyable and fit the game's style, but warned that later puzzles had more arbitrary solutions and were susceptible to bugs. Ronaghan criticized the frequency of the load times and their detriment to the game's pacing. Kevin Mersereau of Destructoid was also irritated by the "archaic and sluggish" save screen. Maher and Kyle McClair of Hardcore Gamer criticized the finale for its monotonous grinding.

The visuals were widely praised as bright, colorful and reminiscent of fifth-generation video games. (Note: Attributed to multiple references:) Faulkner compared the environments to Mega Man Legends and the characters' combat animations to Final Fantasy VII. However, he considered the text font to be unpleasant. The soundtrack was also commended as catchy and eclectic, with Hiroki Kikuta and Toby Fox's contributions receiving particular notice. (Note: Attributed to multiple references:) Zach Welhouse of RPGamer found the voice acting to be honest and relatable, which he said balances out the story's surreal moments, and considered Fayette, Sardinha and Ehrlich to be the standout performances. Heemsbergen also appreciated Ehrlich's performance, but faulted the voice direction for occasionally fumbled lines and "tonally dissonant" conversations. He elaborated that "Alex's lines are generally delivered well, but when he retreats into Murakami-esque introspection, he has a tendency to come across awkwardly due to the more poetic timbre of his narration".

Reviewers were polarized by the game's writing. Mersereau, Faulkner, and Heemsbergen lambasted the main character Alex as an unlikable hipster stereotype. While they felt this characterization made narrative sense, they nevertheless found the gameplay experience unpleasant as a result. Faulkner additionally dismissed the rest of the cast for their "hip" characteristics, but found plentiful dry humor in interpreting the characterizations as deliberate. Bailey, however, considered Alex to be relatable in his loneliness and solace in subcultures. LeClair praised the plot for its elaborate mythos, thematic abundance, and humor, and he enjoyed the game's cast, singling out Claudio as a personal favorite for his enthusiasm. Maher was intrigued by the characters, but found difficulty in caring for them due to their lack of development. He also deemed the game's "post-modern" elements to be pretentious and inadequately built upon. Bailey and Ronaghan faulted the dialogue for its excessive exposition and digressions. Faulkner, LeClair and Ronaghan compared the game's presentation to EarthBound, with Faulkner remarking that it "is a lot like if the Earthbound kids had never gone and saved the world and instead grew up to be weird hipster adults", and Ronaghan interpreting the game's setting as a nihilistic and cynical counterpart to EarthBound's idealistic and upbeat depiction of Americana.

The game has been subject to extensive parody online, often centering around the game's name or writing. The developers have officially acknowledged this in a developer commentary, and often like to play along with and encourage the creation of such content.
