= Two Brothers (video game) =

2013 video game

- Developer: AckkStudios
- Publisher: AckkStudios
- Director: Brian Allanson
- Programmer: Brian Allanson
- Composer: Andrew Allanson
- Engine: Multimedia Fusion 2
- Platform: Microsoft Windows
- Genre: Action role-playing
- Mode: Single-player

Two Brothers is a 2013 action role-playing game developed and published by AckkStudios.

== Gameplay ==
Two Brothers is an action role-playing game with multiple endings. When a player dies, instead of a Game Over screen, the game includes an "Afterlife Hub", where the player can interact with characters, who died within the game, look for clues and explore.

== Development ==
Two Brothers was developed by AckkStudios. Inspiration for the game came from game director Brian Allanson's childhood memories of playing his Game Boy, along with the trend of demakes. To fund the game, a Kickstarter campaign was made, asking for $6,000. The campaign ended at $16,257 with 779 backers.

A director's cut of the game was planned for the PC, Mac, Linux, PlayStation 4, PlayStation Vita and Wii U's Nintendo eShop. The original game was planned for release on Wii U in 2012 with a third-party developer handling the port. The Unity engine would be used for the game. It would also be renamed to Chromophore: The Two Brothers. This was to avoid confusion with Brothers: A Tale of Two Sons. The game was delayed in 2016 as AckkStudios was wrapping development of YIIK: A Postmodern RPG, saying it was 75 percent complete. While AckkStudios said the game was still in development in 2017, as of 2022, the game has not been released.

== Reception ==
Reception

Aggregate score
| Aggregator | Score |
|---|---|
| Metacritic | 57/100 |

Review scores
| Publication | Score |
|---|---|
| Destructoid | 4.5/10 |
| GameSpot | 7/10 |
| RPGamer | 2.5/5 |

On release, Two Brothers received mixed reception from video game critics.
