= Arifureta =

Japanese light novel series and its adaptations

- Arifureta: From Commonplace to World's Strongest
- Cover of the first light novel featuring Yue

ありふれた職業で世界最強 (Arifureta Shokugyō de Sekai Saikyō)
- Genre: Fantasy, harem, isekai
- Novel series
- Written by: Ryo Shirakome
- Published by: Shōsetsuka ni Narō
- Original run: November 7, 2013 – present
- Volumes: 10 + 4 side stories
- Light novel
- Written by: Ryo Shirakome
- Illustrated by: Takayaki
- Published by: Overlap
- English publisher: NA: J-Novel Club (digital); Seven Seas (print)
- Imprint: Overlap Bunko
- Original run: June 25, 2015 – December 25, 2024
- Volumes: 14 + extra
Further information
Manga
Illustrated by	RoGa
Published by	Overlap
English publisher	NA: Seven Seas Entertainment
Magazine	Comic Gardo
Original run	February 6, 2016 – present
Volumes	17
Manga
Arifureta: I Love Isekai
Written by	Misaki Mori
Published by	Overlap
English publisher	NA: Seven Seas Entertainment
Magazine	Comic Gardo
Original run	July 11, 2017 – January 6, 2023
Volumes	5
Light novel
Arifureta: From Commonplace to World's Strongest Zero
Written by	Ryo Shirakome
Illustrated by	Takayaki
Published by	Overlap
English publisher	NA: J-Novel Club
Imprint	Overlap Bunko
Original run	December 28, 2017 – December 25, 2021
Volumes	6
Manga
Arifureta: From Commonplace to World's Strongest Zero
Illustrated by	Ataru Kamichi
Published by	Overlap
English publisher	NA: Seven Seas Entertainment
Magazine	Comic Gardo
Original run	February 23, 2018 – June 8, 2022
Volumes	8
Anime television series
Directed by	Kinji Yoshimoto (S1); Akira Iwanaga (S2–S3)
Produced by	Aya Iizuka; Satoshi Fukao; Youichi Sekine (S1–S2); Yuuichi Izumi (S1–S2); Yuuta Kashiwabara (S1–S2); Kiyonori Hiramatsu (S2–S3); Seiji Andou (S2–S3); Takashi Soyama (S2–S3); Yuri Koenuma (S2–S3); Tatsuya Ueki (S3); Takahiro Sasahara (S3); Shinjirou Ayuzawa (S3)
Written by	Shoichi Sato; Kinji Yoshimoto (S1)
Music by	Ryō Takahashi
Studio	Asread; White Fox (S1); Studio Mother (S2)
Licensed by	AUS: Madman Entertainment; NA: Crunchyroll; SEA: Plus Media Networks Asia
Original network	AT-X, Tokyo MX, SUN, BS11
English network	SEA: Aniplus Asia
Original run	July 8, 2019 – February 17, 2025
Episodes	42 + 4 OVAs
- icon

Arifureta: From Commonplace to World's Strongest (Japanese: ありふれた職業で世界最強, Hepburn: Arifureta Shokugyō de Sekai Saikyō; lit. 'The World's Strongest in a Common Job') is a Japanese light novel series written by Ryo Shirakome and illustrated by Takayaki. Originally a web novel, the series was published in print from June 2015 to September 2022. The series follows Hajime Nagumo, a bullied high school student who is transported to another world with the rest of his class and his school teacher to fight in a war against the demon race. After he is betrayed and left to die by one of his classmates, Hajime begins a journey to improve himself and find a way for everyone to return home. The novels are licensed in English by J-Novel Club, with Seven Seas Entertainment publishing them in print. The English translation of the light novel was done by Murtaza Burhan. A prequel light novel was published in 2017.

The series has received a manga adaptation, serialized on Overlap's Comic Gardo website since 2016, as well as a yonkoma comedy spinoff and a manga adaptation of the prequel novel, all three licensed by Seven Seas. An anime television series adaptation by White Fox and Asread aired from July to October 2019. A second season by Asread and Studio Mother aired from January to March 2022. A third season aired from October 2024 to February 2025.

== Plot ==
High-schooler Hajime Nagumo is bullied by some of his classmates for his relationship with the class idol, Kaori. When he and the rest of his class and their teacher are transported to a fantasy world by the god Ehit, all of his classmates get powerful magical abilities, while Hajime only gains Synergy, the basic alchemical magic to transmute solid materials, a common ability usually found in craftsmen and smiths. During a dungeon raid, Hajime is betrayed and attacked by one of his classmates, sending him plunging to the bottom of the dungeon. He survives the fall and being subsequently attacked by a bear monster, losing his left arm. He becomes stronger by feasting on monster flesh, which changes both his physical appearance and his personality, and uses his Synergy (and the skills gained by eating the monsters) to create weapons to escape the dungeon. On his journey through the labyrinth at the bottom of the dungeon, he discovers the imprisoned vampire princess Yue and frees her. At the end of the labyrinth, Hajime and Yue discover the truth of this world: that Ehit is a tyrant who twisted the world for his own pleasure, forcing the three main races (humans, demons and beast-people) to perpetually war against each other in a twisted game for his own amusement. After Hajime and Yue finally leave the labyrinth and return to the outer world, they are later joined by the rabbit-girl Shea, the perverted dragon-woman Tio, the mer-child Myu and others. Hajime casts away all feelings for his former classmates and makes it his goal to conquer all of the Great Labyrinths to gain the Ancient Magics and artifacts necessary to return to his home world.

== Publication ==
Ryo Shirakome originally published the series as a web novel on the user-submitted content site Shōsetsuka ni Narō. The main story ran for eight books from November 7, 2013, to October 31, 2015, and has been followed by three after-stories and an extra story since. The series was picked up for publication by Overlap, and they released the first light novel, with illustrations by Takayaki, under their Overlap Bunko imprint in June 2015. When the anime adaptation was announced to have been delayed until 2019, the eighth volume of the light novel was also delayed by a month, from March to April 2018. The series ended with the release of its fourteenth volume.

A prequel light novel series titled Arifureta: From Commonplace to World's Strongest Zero (ありふれた職業で世界最強 零, Arifureta Shokugyō de Sekai Saikyō Zero), or Arifureta Zero, was published from December 2017 to December 2021 in six volumes.

Digital publisher J-Novel Club licensed the series for an English release, and published the first chapter on February 21, 2017. During their panel at Anime Expo 2017, Seven Seas Entertainment announced that they would publish a print version of the novels as part of their collaboration with J-Novel Club. J-Novel Club has also licensed Arifureta Zero, and the series was the publisher's first simultaneous publication.

== Media ==
=== Manga ===
A manga adaptation by RoGa has been published on Overlap's Comic Gardo website since its inception on December 22, 2016, and the first volume was published three days later on December 25 to coincide with the release of the fifth light novel. The series has been licensed by Seven Seas Entertainment.

A yonkoma comedy spinoff by Misaki Mori, titled Arifureta: I Heart Isekai (ありふれた日常で世界最強, Arifureta Nichijō de Sekai Saikyō), began serialization on Overlap's Comic Gardo website on July 11, 2017. Seven Seas announced their license to the series on January 10, 2019.

An adaptation of the prequel light novel Arifureta: From Commonplace to World's Strongest Zero by Ataru Kamichi began serialization on February 23, 2018, on the Comic Gardo website. Seven Seas announced their license to the series on January 10, 2019.

=== Audio drama ===
A series of two drama CDs were released with the seventh, eighth, and tenth volumes of the light novel on December 25, 2017, April 25, 2018, and June 25, 2019. The drama CDs share the same voice cast as the anime.

=== Anime ===
An anime television series adaptation was announced on December 3, 2017. The series was initially intended to premiere in April 2018, but on January 15, 2018, its release was pushed back due to "various circumstances". Originally, the series would have been directed by Jun Kamiya and written by Kazuyuki Fudeyasu, with animation by studio White Fox and character designs by Atsuo Tobe, who also would have served as chief animation director. However, following the postponement, it was announced on April 29, 2018, that Kinji Yoshimoto would be taking over as director and studio Asread would be joining White Fox as animators. Additionally, Chika Kojima took over from Atsuo Tobe as character designer to adapt Takayaki's original designs, and Kazuyuki Fudeyasu left his position as scriptwriter, being replaced by Shoichi Sato and Kinji Yoshimoto. Ryō Takahashi composed the series' music. The opening theme song is "Flare", performed by Void Chords feat. LIO, while the ending theme song is "Hajime no Uta" (ハジメノウタ; "First Song") by DracoVirgo.

The series aired from July 8 to October 7, 2019, on AT-X and other networks, and ran for 13 episodes. Two original video animations (OVA) were released with the second and third home video sets on December 25, 2019, and February 26, 2020.

Funimation licensed the series for an English simulcast and SimulDub, which following Sony's acquisition of the namesake platform, the series was moved to Crunchyroll.

After the finale of the first season, it was announced that the series would receive a second season. Akira Iwanaga replaced Kinji Yoshimoto as director, and Studio Mother replaced White Fox as the secondary studio. The rest of the staff and cast returned to reprise their roles. It aired from January 13 to March 31, 2022, and is available to watch on iQiyi. The opening theme song is "Daylight" by MindaRyn, while the ending theme song is "Gedō Sanka" (外道讃歌) by FantasticYouth. A two-part OVA was released on September 25, 2022, titled "The Miraculous Meeting and the Phantasmagorical Adventure" (幻の冒険と奇跡の邂逅, Maboroshi no Bōken to Kiseki no Kaigō).

On September 10, 2022, it was announced that the series would receive a third season. Asread is animating the season, with Akira Iwanaga, Shoichi Sato, and Chika Kojima returning as director, scriptwriter, and character designer, respectively. The season aired from on October 14, 2024, to February 17, 2025. The opening theme song is "Unending Wish" by Void_Chords feat. MindaRyn. On December 31, 2024, it was announced the twelfth episode of season 3 was delayed to January 20, 2025.

=== Game ===
A browser game, titled Arifureta: From Commonplace to World's Strongest - Rebellion Soul was announced in July 2025 on Japanese browser games platform G123, operated by CTW Inc. in the fantasy RPG game. The game will be free-to-play and feature in-game purchases, and is playable on smartphone, tablet, or PC.

== Reception ==
The series was the 27th best-selling light novel series in the first half of 2017, with 84,372 copies sold.

Rebecca Silverman of Anime News Network enjoyed the series, praising it for its central premise and how it was "good twist on the genre conventions" by making its hero have to work for his overpowered hero status instead of immediately gaining it like many light novel protagonists. She criticized the series for its depiction of the romantic relationship between Hajime and Yue, which she called "unhealthy", and also felt that the translation wasn't as good as some of J-Novel Club's other releases.

The anime adaptation was subjected to extremely sharp and negative criticism. Christopher Farris of the Anime News Network, cited manufacturing issues as the main causes of the series's failure. Farris points to the poor quality of the animation and the first episode missing most of the original source of the original novel.

== See also ==
- My Stepmom's Daughter Is My Ex, another light novel series illustrated by the same artist
