= List of Chrome Shelled Regios episodes =

Chrome Shelled Regios is an anime adapted from the light novel series of the same title by Shūsuke Amagi and Miyū. It was directed by Itsuro Kawasaki and produced by the animation studio Zexcs. Set in the future in a polluted Earth where humanity is forced to live inside isolated mobile cities called Regios due to the prevalence of mutated creatures known as contaminoids and with Military Artists who wield kei energies to fight them, the anime plot follows Layfon Alseif, a new student in the academy city of Zuellni, as he reluctantly joins the 17th military arts platoon led by Nina Antalk and his uncertain future in the city.

It was broadcast on TV Kanagawa and TV Tokyo from January 10 to June 20, 2009. Other networks that aired the episodes at later dates include Chiba TV, Sun Television, Tokyo MX, TV Aichi, TV Hokkaido, TV Saitama, and TVQ Kyushu Broadcasting Co. The anime adaptation of the light novels was first confirmed on March 14, 2008, in the promotional cover of the eighth Chrome Shelled Regios light novel, and Kadokawa began to stream a trailer of the anime on November 25, 2008. The final episode of Chrome Shelled Regios was dedicated to production coordinator Tetsuya Koiso, who died nearly one month before the series ended.

Three pieces of theme music are used for the episodes: one opening theme and two closing themes. The opening theme, titled "Brave your truth", is performed by the Japanese band Daisy × Daisy. The closing theme for episodes 1 - 12 is "Yasashii Uso" (優しい嘘 lit. Gentle Lie), while the ending for episodes 13 - 24 is "Ai no Zuellni" (愛のツェルニ lit. Zuellni, My Love). Both themes are performed by Chrome Shelled. Two singles containing the theme music and other tracks are planned for release on February 4, 2009. Twelve DVD compilations are planned for release by Kadokawa between March 27, 2009, and February 26, 2010.

== Episode list ==
No.	Title	Original release date
1	"The Conscious City"; Transliteration: "Ishiki o motsu tosh van" (Japanese: 意識を持つ都市)	January 10, 2009
In a flashback, three powerful fighters wielding the Heaven's Blades begin to fight a giant contaminoid named Limbeekun that has attacked a regios. In the present, Layfon Wolfstein Alseif leaves his regios to attend the academic city of Zuellni. Meanwhile, Nina Antalk loses one of the members of her platoon, and is forced to search for recruits. Layfon arrives in Zuellni as two students start a fight, and cause a building to collapse on another student, Mayshen Torinden. After receiving a telepathic command to save her, Layfon spirits her away from the building with incredible speed. He meets with the president of the student body, Kalian Loss, who forces him to enter a military arts platoon, and Nina, who witnessed Layfon saving Mayshen, recruits Layfon into the 17th Platoon. Afterwards, Layfon meets Felli Loss, another member of the 17th Platoon who sent Layfon the telepathic message earlier. That evening, Layfon recalls that he was one of the fighters wielding the Heaven's Blade against the giant Limbeekun in the past.
2	"Capture the Flag!"; Transliteration: "Furaggu o dasshu seyo!" (Japanese: フラッグを奪取せよ!)	January 17, 2009
Nina recalls a combat exercise set in a capture the flag scenario, in which the students of Zuellni had lost against students from another regios. Nina introduces Layfon to the members of the 17th Platoon, and fights Layfon in a practice duel. While Layfon fares well, he is sent into a wall by Nina's kei blast. Afterwards, Felli confronts Layfon about allowing Nina to defeat him, and reveals that her brother Kalian planned to force Layfon to enter the military arts. Layfon meets with Nina during his part-time job, and Nina reveals that she ran away from her parents to learn the military arts in Zuellni. The 17th Platoon, after entering into a capture the flag battle scenario against the 16th Platoon, fares poorly against them. As Nina is about to be defeated, Felli sends Nina's thoughts to Layfon, who uses a powerful burst of kei to defeat the 16th Platoon members to the astonishment of the onlookers. Nina and Felli, furious at Layton, go their separate ways after the battle, one thinking he deliberately held back his strength while the other believing he inadvertently unleashed his powers.
3	"Electronic Spirit Zuellni"; Transliteration: "Denshi Seirei Tsueruni" (Japanese: 電子精霊ツェルニ)	January 24, 2009
In the proto-city of Glendan, Leerin Marfes meets Synola Leisler, who sees a vision of a winged beast and a young black haired girl through Leerin's eyes. Meanwhile in Zuellni, Kalian questions Layfon as to why he continues to work in machinery when his tuition has been already waived. Layfon, later meeting up with Nina, explains that he wants to start a new life without having to always fight. A group of cloaked hunters have captured Zuellni, the electronic spirit of the city in the form of a blue girl. A mysterious stranger, later recognized as Dickserio Muscaine appears, transporting them along with Nina to an alternate dimension. There, Nina and Dickserio defeat the cloaked hunters and save Zuellni, but not long before Dickserio uses his kei energy to put Nina to sleep. As Nina recuperates, Harley Sutton tells Layfon an incident in Nina’s childhood that made her seek power when her life was saved by the sacrifice of the electronic spirit of her hometown. As Layfon heads home, he meets Mifi Rotten and Naruki Gelni, bringing Mayshen along with them. Felli later forgives Layfon for what happened at the inter-platoon match earlier, but in the exchange for assigning nicknames for each other as a result. As Felli uses her psychokinetic powers, she detects a large dragon in the distance. In a flashback, Ailain Garfied rescues a young girl named Saya from attackers as they try to escape a complex.
4	"Disarmament! Put on the Maid Outfit!"; Transliteration: "Busō kaijo! Meido Fuku o Chakuyō Seyo !" (Japanese: 武装解除!メイド服を着用せよ!)	January 31, 2009
In a flashback, Saya and Ailain have become bodyguards to Ramis, assigned to evade two cars pursuing them. Back in the present, Sharnid Elipton takes Layfon to a maid cafe, and it turns out that Felli just so happens to work there. Felli reveals to Layfon that she works there to choose her own path in life. While dining at a bakery, Felli overhears Mifi, Naruki, and Mayshen talking about investigating an abandoned research center, which is supposedly haunted, and she decides to accompany them. As they go deeper into the building, the three are suddenly captured by a strange creature and Felli is rescued by Vanzeh Hardy, who reveals that the closure of the center was caused by repeatedly failed experiments that were undergone years ago as a counter to contaminoids in the past. After the two encounter the creature again, Felli crushes it by causing the ceiling to collapse while Vanzeh gives it the finishing blow. Vanzeh decide to cover up the incident by telling the girls that they were knocked out by leaking chemicals. Layfon accompanies Felli where he finally sees her smile but gets kicked by her for seeing it.
5	"The Enemy that Lurks in Death's Ground"; Transliteration: "Shi no Daichi ni Hisomu Teki" (Japanese: 死の大地に潜む敵)	February 7, 2009
In the flashback, Saya, Ailain, and Ramis are now being chased by large mutant dogs controlled by Zidd. As the 17th Platoon takes a day off from training, Nina and Harley watching the inter-platoon matches, while Layfon goes out with Mayshen for lunch. However, the city of Zuellni falls into a ditch, attracting a large number of larvae contaminoids from their nest below ground. With an invasion into the regios eminent, Kalian orders all military arts students to defend the city and repel the monsters, despite most of them having no experience fighting against contaminoids. Layfon requests Nina and Sharnid, who are assigned to lead the 9th Platoon to defend the northwest section of the city, to evacuate since they are no match against the bugs, but Nina disregards his advice. After realizing that his friends are in grave danger, Layton later gains the resolve to fight in order to protect the people he cares for. The 9th Platoon abandons Nina and Sharnid after their weapons barely make a scratch against the creatures. When Nina meets face to face with one of the bugs, she is saved by Layfon, who is now equipped with a modified DITE, thanks to Harley. With Felli's help, Layfon locates the nest and destroys the queen contaminoid with his DITE. As sunrise appears, Layfon returns and collapses from exhaustion onto Nina, who can do nothing else but congratulate him.
6	"The Letter from Glendan"; Transliteration: "Gurendan kara no Tegami" (Japanese: グレンダンからの封書(てがみ))	February 14, 2009
Nina realizes her weakness after seeing that she is relying too much on Layfon, and the gap of difference between their power is too wide after losing their current inter-platoon match, all of which has made her reluctant to do any training with the 17th Platoon. Meanwhile, Layfon is asked by Kalian to identify the dragon larvae contaminoid that Felli detected one night, a stronger variant than the ones that invaded Zuellni. Layfon agrees to kill it before the city arrives to its location and it reaches its mature stages. Layfon volunteers to help Naruki do police work, where the latter’s official acceptance into the police force is at stake. During this whole time, Leerin's letter arrives at Zuellni but is mistakenly delivered to Mayshen. She decides to hand it to Layfon herself but chickens out and loses the letter. In turn, Felli picks up the letter, yet she hinders to give it to him despite the many chances of doing so. Felli decides just to put it under his bag in the locker room, but instead it is found by Nina, who finally delivers the letter to him herself.
7	"Adamandite Restored"; Transliteration: "Adamandaito, Fukugen" (Japanese: 複合錬金鋼(アダマンダイト)、復元)	February 21, 2009
Harley has created an adamandite sword for Layfon to use on his mission to kill the dragon larvae contaminoid. At nighttime, Layfon, Mayshen, Naruki, and Mifi find out that Nina is secretly training at the outskirts of the city. Nina feels inferior to Layfon and pledges herself to become stronger. The four then witness her passing out from fatigue and they send her to the hospital. Layfon, before departing for his mission, gives a recovering Nina some advice about using her kei and how to become stronger. Upon arriving at the dragon contaminoid nest, Layfon, with the use of telepathy from Felli, must fight the dragon, which has now evolved to its first stage of maturity. Sharnid threatens Harley to clarify the current situation involving Layfon. Come sunrise, Layfon manages to weaken the monster but damages his adamandite in the process. Nina and Sharnid come to the rescue, and Nina concocts a plan to kill the dragon. The dragon is lured into a nearby canyon, and, with much teamwork by the platoon, is dealt a fatal blow to its forehead. Layfon thanks Nina for her guidance and her trust, hoping to work together for the good of the platoon. Layfon, Nina, and Sharnid are taken back to their regios, with Felli and Harley waiting for them there.
8	"A Former Enemy Reduced to a Ruined City"; Transliteration: "Katsute no Teki wa Haito to Narihate" (Japanese: かつての敵は廃都と成り果て)	February 28, 2009
Leerin meets with Savaris Qaulafin Lueckens and Lintens Savoled Harden, who tell her that they will currently be her bodyguards for a while, because she is being targeted. Meanwhile, an inter-platoon match occurs between the 17th Platoon and the 5th Platoon, in which the former becomes victorious. As a party is held to celebrate their success, Layfon takes an early leave in depression. At work, Nina discusses how happy she becomes when her platoon wins each match, but Layfon has his opposing views. Kalian orders both the 17th Platoon and 5th Platoon to go to a lost academy city, which was destroyed by the contaminoids, and look around for any survivors. When they arrive, Nina realizes the city is Gandoweria, which they fought against and lost to two years ago, shocked to see it in ruins. When Nina runs away, Layfon chases after her to the top of the flag base, and he momentarily saves her from being crushed by the exuviae of a contaminoid.
9	"The Right to be a Heaven's Blade"; Transliteration: "Tenken Jujusha no Shikaku" (Japanese: 天剣授受者の資格)	March 7, 2009
Gorneo Lueckens reveals to Nina about Layfon's past as a Heaven's Blade Keeper. Much of Layfon's past is revealed, including his relationship with Leerin. Gorneo also reveals that he hold a grudge against Layfon for crippling Gahard Barehn for life. When Nina questions Layfon about his feelings concerning military arts, he replies to only keep his survival, but she refuses to accept his way of thinking. A human contaminoid attacks Leerin, but Derk Saiharden, her foster father, tries to hold it off, until Synola manages to save them. Savaris, identifying the human contaminoid as Gahard, harshly defeats him. Shante Laite attacks Gorneo out of the blue, but she knocks herself out by smashing her head into the ceiling. Later on, after a chat between Layfon and Felli, the former is confronted by Nina. She admits that she will not deny his way of thinking, but she does not understand it, concluding that he should resign from her platoon after this mission.
10	"Lueckens's Revenge"; Transliteration: "Rukkensu No Fukushū" (Japanese: ルッケンスの復讐)	March 14, 2009
Felli senses a life-form somewhere within Gandoweria. Nina does not listen to Layfon's suggestions due to rejecting his philosophy of doing anything to live. In the past, Layfon had participated in underground matches, leading up to his expulsion from the Heaven's Blades. He fought Gahard in an underground tournament, critically wounding him. Layfon determines that the life-form is actually Gandoweria, the electronic spirit of the ruined city in the form of a golden goat, said to be known as the Fallen One. Felli is kidnapped by Shante, but she is later saved by Gorneo. In the selenium fuel repository, Shante attacks Layfon with her DITE in the form of a spear, but fails to land a hit. She accidentally thrusts it into the selenium reactor, causing an explosion. Layfon pipes it down by firing a huge amount of kei at it. Layfon brings Gorneo to safety, while Nina saves Shante from plummeting.
11	"Spa Resort Kalian"; Transliteration: "Supa Rizōto Kalian" (Japanese: スパ•リゾート•カリアン)	March 21, 2009
At his spa resort, Kalian is recuperating from fainting earlier while on duty. As a reluctant Felli spots the rest of the 17th Platoon at the resort, Kalian suggests Nina to teach her how to swim. Meanwhile, Layfon is convinced by Naruki and Mifi to teach Mayshen how to swim as well. However, Felli develops jealousy after seeing Layfon and Mayshen together. In the flashback, after Ailain guns down the mutant dogs, the bridge collapses during the chase. Felli frustrates over and over about Layfon, and if it was coincidental for him to be teaching Mayshen. At night, Felli sees everyone talking to Kalian about a deal of some sort. The next day, Layfon agrees to teach Felli this time around. Kalian, having noticed Felli being bashful toward Layfon, summons him to an armored room, questions his relationship with her, and warns him not to harm her in any way. Later at night, Nina and Felli are taken hostage by a group of terrorists. After grabbing their DITEs from the front desk counter, the two take down the terrorists. Felli soon realizes that Kalian bribed the platoon into teaching Felli how to swim in order to limit her telekinetic energy. A maddened Felli then infiltrates the armored room and kicks Kalian in the shin, supposedly shattering his shinbone.
12	"A Tender Lie"; Transliteration: "Yasashii Uso" (Japanese: ヤサシイウソ)	March 28, 2009
Nina treats her platoon members to dinner at a restaurant, after having lost a wager made by Sharnid during their practice with training balls earlier in the day. Sharnid chances upon Dinn Dee, the captain of the 10th Platoon, who is also at the restaurant, but the latter is upset that the former left his platoon. After recalling his time spent in the 10th Platoon, Sharnid spots Dalsiena Che Matelna and starts to follow her in the streets. Naruki drags Layfon to a crime scene where they have people using overload cornered in a garage. An unknown redheaded male busts through with a katana and escapes. In the flashback, after the bridge has deteriorated, Ramis is traumatized by the sight of a thousand eyes. Luckily, Ailain is able to eradicate them all. During their battle, Layfon finds out that the redheaded male is Haia Salinban Lyia, leader of the Salinban Mercenary Training Group. Haia breaks Layfon's adamandite sword, but Layfon beats Haia off the roof into a nearby store, sending a kei blast and causing an explosion. Meanwhile, Dalsiena apprehend Sharnid on a rooftop, asking why he left the 10th Platoon and why he broke his vow. Myunfa Rufa shoots a bow and arrow at Layfon as a distraction, and this allows both Haia and Myunfa to make a run for it. The two break into Gorneo's room, much to Shante's irritation. Leerin and Derek are summoned by Queen Alsheyra, in which Leerin asks if Layfon can ever come back to Glendan.
13	"The Sentiment That Lies in the Barrel of a Gun"; Transliteration: "Jūshin ni Himeta Omoi" (Japanese: 銃身に秘めた想い)	April 4, 2009
Alsheyra indicates it is up to Layfon whether or not he chooses to return to Glendan. Haia wants to know if Gorneo has information about the Fallen One. Layfon, giving up his adamandite sword to Harley to have it repaired, declines the offer to use a katana for combat. In the flashback, Ramis sees a travelling inspector, who says will protect her via plea bargain from a man connected to the Kalfa family. As it seems that Nina is worried about Layfon, Naruki interrupts them and asks for their help to solve the issue concerning the overload smuggling. Meanwhile, Felli meets with Haia and Myunfa, along with Kalian, at the train station. As Naruki suspects Dinn to be behind this, Nina later goes out on her own and confronts Dinn to stop what he is doing, but he says that he is doing it in order to become stronger for the good of the city. Nina explains to Layfon and Naruki that Sharnid suddenly left the 10th Platoon during an inter-platoon match. Dinn was angry and challenged Sharnid, but the latter showed no defense and took a beating. Sharnid then agreed to be in the 17th Platoon because of this. Kalian comes up with a plan to disband the 10th Platoon, in which Layfon must team up with Haia to stop Dinn, but Haia sees Layfon as a disgrace for relying on the adamandite sword instead of mastering the katana.
14	"The Fallen Ones Appear"; Transliteration: "Fallen Ones Arawaru" (Japanese: 廃貴族現る)	April 11, 2009
With an inter-platoon match underway, Sharnid asks permission from his team to allow him to face off against Dalsiena by himself. During a municipal challenge long ago, the former captain of 10th Platoon became dejected after her team had lost. Sharnid, Dinn, and Dalsiena made a vow to defend the city with their own hands, but their friendship started falling apart as a consequence. Because of that, Sharnid wants to reconnect with Dinn and Dalsiena again. During the match, Dinn begins to feel the side effects from the overload. On an open field, Sharnid parts the ground using his sniper, separating Dinn from Dalsiena. As Sharnid engages in a battle against Dalsiena, he interrogates her if the vow had any meaning to her. When Dalsiena has the upper hand, Sharnid mentions that Dinn was using the overload and hid that fact from her. In the flashback, an attack at the inspector's office has occurred, and Ailain goes outside to take care of it, while Saya stays behind with Ramis. Layfon begins to fight against Dinn, but as the latter is defeated easily, he goes into a berserk state due to the presence of a Fallen One. Haia comes in and captures Dinn in order to extract the Fallen One. In retaliation, Layfon challenges Haia to a duel, and the former wins, much to the latter's surprise. Nina figures out that the Fallen One is showing a projection of Dinn's consciousness. Sharnid fights off Myunfa, while Dalsiena finds Dinn deep into the forest. Even though Dalsiena had so much affection for Dinn, she tells him that the 10th Platoon should no longer exist.
15	"Feelings That Are Not Received"; Transliteration: "Todokanai Kimochi" (Japanese: 届かない気持ち)	April 18, 2009
The 17th Platoon are taking a trip to a training camp, which Mifi, Naruki, and Mayshen agreed to be their sponsors for an article review. While Layfon decides to help Mayshen in the kitchen, both Nina and Felli spy on them. When Sharnid shows the two a peeler, they fight over it until Layfon leaves the kitchen, saying that he work is already finished. During a mock match, Layfon faces off against Naruki, along with the other platoon members, taking her out with ease and winning the match unaided. As the crew later sits down for dinner, Nina scolds Layfon for sharing sandwiches with her that were originally made by Mayshen. Layfon receives a letter passed under his door to meet Mayshen at a bridge. After he apologizes, he explains that he was exiled from Glendan due to breaking the law of the military arts. The bridge suddenly starts crumbling, and Layfon grabs Mayshen to safety as he slices through the falling rubble. However, as it seems that Mayshen remains unscathed, it is Layfon that has been severely wounded.
16	"Zuellni Run Amok and the Contaminoid Offensive!"; Transliteration: "Tseruni Bōsō, Osenjū Shūgeki" (Japanese: ツェルニ暴走、汚染獣襲撃)	April 25, 2009
Leerin tells Synola that she wishes to go meet Layfon in Zuellni. Felli, visiting Layfon in the hospital, sees that Nina visited earlier and brought him flowers, much to Felli's jealousy. Nina is already aware that Layfon's surgery is scheduled on the day of the inter-platoon match against the 1st Platoon, making her that much more determine to become stronger. Sharnid requests Dalsiena to join the 17th Platoon, not only to fill in for Layfon this time around, but also to become an official member of the platoon. Mifi and Naruki informs Layfon that Mayshen blames herself for his current condition. During the match, Nina is overwhelmed by Vanzeh due to her predictable movements. Shortly after Layfon's dismissal from the hospital, Mayshen meets with him by the train station, where she thanks him for protecting her. After Mayshen is dropped off at the next station, Layfon goes to see Kalian elsewhere, who summons him to temporarily join the Salinban Mercenary Training Group in order to destroy the incoming contaminoids that the city is slowly heading towards. Dalsiena is highly disappointed for by the fact at how badly they lost against the first platoon in the inter-platoon match. Derek asks Leerin to deliver a DITE to Layfon through inheritance when she departs from Glendan.
17	"Salinban Mercenary Training Group, Move Out!"; Transliteration: "Sarinban Kyōdō Yōheidan, Shutsujin!" (Japanese: サリンバン教導傭兵団、出陣!)	May 2, 2009
In the flashback, after Zidd engulfs Ailain, he then moves on to face Saya. Nina, receiving word that Zuellni has run amok, goes into a chamber inside the machinery department, finding Gandoweria hovering over Zuellni, who is encased in crystal. Gandoweria, recognizing her incredibly strong will, forcefully possess Nina against her refusal. Alsheyra has Savalis escort Leerin to Zuellni and investigate on the recent containmoid attacks there. Layfon has his platoon record footage of Salinban Mercenary Training Group fighting off the contaminoids in the area to witness their strategy of combat. Even though Layfon suffers some injuries, he still manages to get the job done. Meanwhile, Kalian sends a search team to find Nina in the machinery department, but he is informed that she is nowhere to be found.
18	"Nina Missing! Zuellni in Crisis"; Transliteration: "Nīna Shōshitsu! Tsueruni Kinkyū Jitai" (Japanese: ニーナ消失!ツェルニ緊急事態)	May 9, 2009
Layfon has been told to rest after being sent out to battle constant larvae contaminoids encountered across the city. Leerin and Savalis arrive in the academy city of Myath and they are greeted by Loi Entorio who tells them that a valuable item has been stolen from this city. At the dining hall, Leerin and Nina meet each other. Nina informs Leerin that she doesn't remember how she came back to the city. Felli has collapsed from depleting her psychokinetic energy, waking up to Layfon's presence, but after he leaves, she hears a gunshot outside. When Leerin invites Nina back to her place, a red bird flies to the window and the two notice a giant glowing orb full of red birds at a distance. An alarm then sounds that the city is under attack by incoming contaminoids. As Nina chases after Myath, the electronic spirit of the city in the form of a red bird, she is stopped by an occult called the Wolfmask Mob, asking her to join them since she possesses the power of the Fallen One. Also, as Savalis brings Leerin to a safer area, she choose to go towards the orb to free the red birds, along with the help of Loi, who saves her from falling off the roof of a building. It is revealed that Kalian previously tranquilized Layfon to prevent him from going off on his own. Kalian later announces to the public that the city must prepare to defend itself against the contaminoids that are soon approaching. Even though Felli wants to go out of her way to use her psychokinetic energy to assist Layfon, he declines her offer and says that he will do this by himself.
19	"A Guided Encounter"; Transliteration: "Michibikareta Deai" (Japanese: 導かれた出会い)	May 16, 2009
Dickserio drops in and defeats the Wolfmask Mob surrounding Nina. When Leerin travels inside the machinery department to transport Myath to its core, Loi tries to capture her, but as she starts tapping on the floor repeatedly, he recalls the painful memories of fighting a contaminoid. Nina jumps in to help Leerin, and he runs away when he sees that Nina has possessed Gandoweria inside of her. After that, Nina informs Leerin that her hometown has a mechanical womb with the ability to give birth to electronic spirits. At night, a contaminoid is heard to be breaking into the barrier. Savalis trips and cripples Loi when being seen running in the streets. Loi, pleading for his life, begs Savalis to destroy the contaminoid. As Nina becomes overwhelmed by Gandoweria, Myath tells Leerin to pray in order to save Nina. In a vision, Saya appears and tells Leerin that she will lend some of her power to save Nina. All of the students of the academic city of Zuellni charge in to fight the mass number of contaminoids, and Felli tells Layfon and Kalian that the electronic spirit of Zuellni is outside the city. Dickerio tells Nina that she must protect Leerin, who possesses the ancestral electronic spirit within her, then he cuts off the kei rope he made that they were standing on, sending Nina falling from the skies above Zuellni. Layfon, after killing several contaminoids, propels himself in the air with his DITE. Layfon and Nina then see each other and embrace.
20	"The Night Before the Intermunicipal Battle"; Transliteration: "Toshisen Zen'ya" (Japanese: 都市戦前夜)	May 23, 2009
Nina finally returns to her comrades, but cannot explain away to her members what occurred while she was in Myath, including the existence of Gandoweria residing in her body. Layfon agrees to train with Shante upon Gorneo's consent. In the flashback, as it seems that Zidd has defaced the entire Kalfa family, Ailen is revealed to still be alive. Haia is frustrated with the feeling of inferiority he has harbored against Layfon, resolving to challenge him to a duel. While Felli openly sulks over Layfon's return to normalcy over Nina's unexpected return, criticizing Nina's evasive attitude and berating Layfon's calm acceptance over this fact, Haia makes her the bait for this long-awaited duel. Layfon is sent a message regarding the conditions to get Felli back. As Myath draws closer the night before the intermunicipal battle, Layfon prepares for a confrontation with Haia even as Leerin finally steps inside Zuellni.
21	"Felli, Kidnapped"; Transliteration: "Ubawareta Feri" (Japanese: 奪われたフェリ)	May 30, 2009
Felli is revealed to be held in captivity, unable to use her psychokinetic energy because Fellmouse has contained it all. Haia and his group may have a chance of returning to Glendan after having captured a Fallen One. In the flashback, Ailen destroys Zidd inside the building. As the students of Zuellni are ready to face against the students of Myath, it turns out that Myath has changed its course, postponing the inter-city battle. During an intense duel, Layfon has the upper hand until Haia unleashes his fearsome attack and turns the table. Nina heads toward the area to witness the fight while Felli manages to break free. Despite his injuries during the match, Layfon manages to defeat Haia. Layfon finally reunites with Nina and Felli. Leerin slaps him as she is upset to see people are still worried about him. Glendan has been heading towards Zuellni, resulting in Myath’s change in course.
22	"The Invincible, Spear-Shelled City Glendan Draws Near!"; Transliteration: "Muteki no Sōkaku Toshi Gurendan Semaru!" (Japanese: 無敵の槍殻都市グレンダン迫る!)	June 6, 2009
As Layfon is back in the hospital to be treated, Leerin visits and confronts him. She scolds him about his unexpected decision to remain active in battles, despite his initial resolve to turn over a new leaf. She then reveals that she previously encountered Nina at Myath, piquing Layfon's interest. Meanwhile, Gorneo crosses paths with Savalis, who tells him that he is in search of a Fallen One somewhere in the city. Savalis coldly tells Gorneo of Gahard's fate as a contaminoid, whom he eliminated. His harsh comments and pointed remarks about Gorneo's own mediocrity angers Shante, and he leaves Gorneo loudly weeping for Gahard's demise. Kalian contact Layfon that Glendan is getting closer and preparations are being made for the worst-case scenario of the two cities battling one another. Layfon declines the offer of returning to Glendan with Leerin, and he sets out to meet with the rest of the 17th Platoon. Layfon believes that Nina is housing the electronic spirit of Zuellni and is possessed by the electronic spirit of Gandoweria inside her body. Kalian suggests that the only method is to forcibly extricate it out of her, but they all are reminded of what happened to Dinn after this was attempted. A contaminoid has breached the academic city of Zuellni, creating an aurora in the sky, but it is consequently split in half caused by the cannon fuelled with kei. Nina makes her way outside of the city, uncertain of what Gandoweria means to make her do.
23	"Ignacius's Fragments"; Transliteration: "Igunashisu no Kakera" (Japanese: イグナシスの欠片)	June 13, 2009
Zuellni has stopped moving since Nina had disappeared. The contaminoid that had been blasted in half by the cannon is confirmed to still be alive yet dormant, and it will take two hours before the cannon can be recharged again. Dickserio travels into the inner palace of Glendan through a labyrinth. Barmeleen Swattis Norne mistakes him as an intruder, but they both encounter the Wolfmask Mob along the way. While Felli, Sharnid, Harley, and Dalsiena head out to search for Nina, Layfon makes his way towards the comatose contaminoids. Prior to this, Felli had defied Kalian in order to assist her platoon. The Wolfmask Mob appears in several different areas of the labyrinth, urging Alsheyra to send out more Heaven's Blade wielders to defend the palace. Layfon, finding Nina in the outskirts of the city, sees her fully possessed and wearing a large goat mask. He manages to take the mask off of her and carries her to safety. Layfon explains to Nina that he wanted to atone for his sins for using his sword for the wrong reasons. However, she believes that he should fight for others and not for himself. Other Heaven's Blade wielders are seen fighting the contaminoids. As Layfon sets off to join them, Savalis attacks the rest of the platoon and kidnaps Nina.
24	"The Stirring Cities"; Transliteration: "Taidō Suru Toshi" (Japanese: 胎動する都市)	June 20, 2009
Leerin begs Gorneo and Shante to deliver the Saiharden Katana to Layfon. Savalis tries to extract Gandoweria out of Nina, but Layfon intervenes and rescues her. However, this causes Savalis to be infested by Gandoweria, due to their conflicting kei blasts. Layfon then struggles against a fierce battle against Savalis. The spirit of Saya, in the form of a Heaven's Blade, chooses Layfon as her wielder, enabling Layfon to defeat Savalis. Leerin successfully gives the Saiharden Katana to Layfon afterwards. Layfon then combines both the Heaven's Blade and the Saiharden Katana into one sword. As the other Heaven's Blade wielders are busy handling the Wolfmask Mob and the contaminoid, one of the contaminoid becomes airborne and wreaks havoc upon the city. As the cannon would be rendered useless in this situation, Kalian issues all citizens to evacuate from Zuellni to Glendan. Layfon soars into the air and attacks the airborne contaminoid with full force, and the cannon blasts the creature. At the same time, the other Heaven's Blade wielders combine their strength to destroy the other restrained contaminoid. Lintens takes a recovering Leerin back to Glendan, and Alsheyra is happy to see her again alive and well. Layfon sends Leerin a letter indicating that he will return to Glendan one day very soon.
