= Mifi (disambiguation) =

MiFi is a brand name of a wireless router that acts as mobile Wi-Fi hotspot.

Mifi may also refer to:

- Mifi (department), a location in Cameroon
- MIFI d.o.o., Slovenian promoter of Metaldays music festival
- Mifi Rotten, a Chrome Shelled Regios character
- MIFI, the romanisation of the Cyrillic abbreviation of the Moscow Engineering Physics Institute
