= Sphere Club =

- Genre: Variety show
- Starring: Minako Kotobuki; Ayahi Takagaki; Haruka Tomatsu; Aki Toyosaki
- Country of origin: Japan
- Original language: Japanese

Original release
- Network: NTV
- Release: July 16, 2011

Sphere Club (スフィアクラブ) is a Japanese television series that debuted on July 16, 2011.

== See also ==
- Sphere (Japanese band)
