= DaisyxDaisy =

DaisyxDaisy デイジーデイジー
- Also known as: MiKA
- Born: October 4, 1983 (age 41); Ehime
- Origin: Japan
- Genres: J-Pop
- Occupation: Singer
- Instrument: Vocals
- Works: Genesis & Rebirth; DaisyxDaisy
- Years active: 2005––present
- Website: ameblo.jp/daisy-daisy-mika/

Daisy×Daisy (Japanese: デイジーデイジー) is the solo project of Japanese singer MiKA (born on October 4, 1983, in Ehime, province to the northwest of Shikoku). It was originally a duo with MiKA (vocals/lyrics) and yuuki (guitarist/composer/lyricist) created in 2005, but yuuki decided to leave in 2008. However, MiKA carried on as a solo act, but kept the name DaisyxDaisy. In 2009, the single "brave your truth" reached 19th in the Oricon chart.

MiKA comes from a family of musicians. She studied Enka, a traditional Japanese style of music, from the age of four. She then moved to Tokyo, where she learned music from an Enka master. However, she felt like experimenting with different styles, and ended up forming a band. Since then, many have considered her to be a rock singer.

She has performed abroad, having gone to Brazil in 2018 to São Paulo at Anime Dreams; and in Recife at Anima Recife.

== Discography ==
=== Singles ===
- Daybreak Believer (March 7, 2008)
- 8 Higher self / SWEET GIRL (July 6, 2008) – Opening for the program Media Research Institute
- Brave your truth (February 4, 2009) – Opening of anime Koukaku no Regios
- HOLY SHINE (November 23, 2010) – Ending of Fairy Tail
- EVIDENCE (April 20, 2011) – 7th opening of Fairy Tail

=== Mini-Albums ===
1. Pieces (August 3, 2007)
2. Fate (August 3, 2007)
3. Category (December 16, 2009)
4. Answer to the master (February 26, 2010)

=== Albums ===
1. Genesis & Rebirth (October 3, 2008)
2. Daisy×Daisy (November 16, 2011)

=== DVDs ===
1. "DREAM ROAD" TOUR 2007 〜pieces & Fate〜 (October 26, 2007)
2. Daisy x Daisy LIVE 2007 〜新たなる旅立ち〜I (May 9, 2008)
3. Daisy x Daisy LIVE 2007 〜新たなる旅立ち〜II (May 9, 2008)
