= Natsuiro Kiseki =

Japanese manga and anime series

- 夏色キセキ
- Genre: Slice of life
- Developed by: Tatsuhiko Urahata
- Directed by: Seiji Mizushima
- Voices of: Minako Kotobuki; Ayahi Takagaki; Haruka Tomatsu; Aki Toyosaki
- Music by: Nijine; Masumi Itō
- Country of origin: Japan
- Original language: Japanese
- No. of episodes: 12 + OVA

Production
- Production companies: Sunrise; Aniplex; Music Ray'n; Lantis; MBS

Original release
- Network: MBS, TBS, HBC, SBS, RKB, CBC, BS-TBS
- Release: April 6 – June 29, 2012

Related
- Manga
- Written by: Sunrise
- Illustrated by: Tatsuhiko
- Published by: Square Enix
- Magazine: Young Gangan
- Original run: January 20, 2012 – March 15, 2013
- Volumes: 3

Natsuiro Kiseki (夏色キセキ, A Summer-Colored Miracle) is a Japanese original anime television series produced by Sunrise and directed by Seiji Mizushima. The series aired on MBS between April and June 2012. A manga adaptation illustrated by Tatsuhiko was serialized in Square Enix's Young Gangan magazine between January 2012 and March 2013.

== Plot ==
At a Shinto shrine in Shimoda, there is a large rock. It is said that if four close friends gather around the rock and they all wish for the same thing, that wish will come true. As four friends, Natsumi, Saki, Yuka and Rinko, gather around the rock like they used to in their childhood, they soon find the rock can indeed grant people's wishes. With only a short amount of time before Saki is due to transfer schools, the girls spend a summer filled with magic.

== Characters ==
=== Main characters ===
Natsumi Aizawa (逢沢 夏海, Aizawa Natsumi)
Voiced by: Minako Kotobuki
The member of her school's tennis club, who is often quite stubborn but cares deeply about her friends, especially Saki.
Saki Mizukoshi (水越 紗季, Mizukoshi Saki)
Voiced by: Ayahi Takagaki
Natsumi's best friend and next door neighbor who is to transfer schools due to her parents moving to Tokyo. She doesn't tend to believe in supernatural things. Has dreams of entering the tennis championship.
Yuka Hanaki (花木 優香, Hanaki Yuka)
Voiced by: Haruka Tomatsu
A hyperactive girl who admires idols, especially the idol group Four Season. She constantly beckons everyone to work towards the goal of becoming an idol group together. She works at her family's hot spring inn.
Rinko Tamaki (環 凛子, Tamaki Rinko)
Voiced by: Aki Toyosaki
A laid back girl with simple thoughts who is often supporting Yuka. She works as a shrine maiden at a shrine where the magical rock lies. Whenever she has a fever, she sees whales flying around.

=== Supporting characters ===
Suzuka Aizawa (逢沢涼夏, Aizawa Suzuka)
Voiced by: Miyuki Sawashiro
Natsumi's mother.
Daiki Aizawa (逢沢大樹, Aizawa Daiki)
Voiced by: Kei Shindo
Natsumi's younger brother.
Yūsuke (祐介)
Voiced by: Mako
One of Daiki's friends. He has allegedly seen Natsumi and her friends flying in the sky, believing them to be witches.
Keita (啓太)
Voiced by: Mikako Komatsu
One of Daiki's friends.
Takashi Sano (佐野 貴史, Sano Takashi)
Voiced by: Mamoru Miyano
Yuka's cousin and a member of the school baseball team who occasionally makes deliveries to the inn Yuka works at. Yuka has a crush on him, but he himself has a thing for Saki.
Koharu Okiyama (沖山 小晴, Okiyama Koharu)
Voiced by: Yuka Terasaki
A boyish looking girl who lives with her twin sister, Chiharu, on an island in Tokyo where Saki is due to move. She is a bit hostile towards outsiders as Saki's parents are replacing the doctor she admired so much.

== Media ==
=== Manga ===
A manga adaptation, based on the anime and illustrated by Tatsuhiko, was serialized in Square Enix's Young Gangan magazine between January 20, 2012, and March 15, 2013. Three tankōbon volumes were released between May 25, 2012, and March 25, 2013.

=== Anime ===
The anime television series was produced by Sunrise and directed by Seiji Mizushima. The screenplay was written by Tatsuhiko Urahata, and the chief animator Yuichi Tanaka based the character design used in the anime on Hidari's original concept. The sound director was Hiromi Kikuta, and the soundtrack was composed by Nijine and Masumi Itō. The series aired on MBS from April 6 to June 29, 2012. A short original video animation episode was released on August 29, 2012. The respective opening and ending themes, both performed by Sphere, are "Non stop road" and "Ashita e no Kaerimichi" (明日への帰り道, Tomorrow's Road Home). Sphere also performed the insert songs used throughout the series, such as "Yasashisa ni Tsutsumareru Yōni" (優しさに包まれるように, To Be Wrapped in Tenderness) used in episode one.

==== Episode list ====
No.	Title	Original release date
1	"Our 11th Summer Vacation" "Jū-ichi-kaime no Natsu Yasumi" (11回目のナツヤスミ)	March 31, 2012 (preview); April 6, 2012
A few days before summer vacation, Natsumi Aizawa falls out with her friend, Saki Mizukoshi, when she decides to quit the tennis club. The next day, Saki reveals she is transferring schools, which upsets Natsumi. Wanting them to make up, their other friends Yuka Hanaki and Rinko Tamaki call Natsumi and Saki to a large rock at a shrine temple they used to visit in their childhood, said to grant wishes to friends who wish for the same thing. As they gather together at the rock and casually observe the sky, the rock gives off a strange magical glow and the girls soon find they are able to fly.
2	"A Heart's Value" "Kokoro Kasanete" (ココロかさねて)	April 13, 2012
The day after they flew, Natsumi and Saki are still hostile towards each other. As Yuka and Rinko hang out at the rock and casually think that Natsumi and Saki are best when they're together, the rock's magic activates, causing Natsumi and Saki to become literally stuck to each other like magnets, finding themselves unable to pull away from each other. Realizing this is Yuka and Rinko's doing, Natsumi and Saki cooperate with each other to chase the culprits across town. As the chase reaches its climax, Rinko mentions to Natsumi and Saki about Yuka's desire for them to make up before the two go on to stop Yuka before she runs into the ocean, only for the magic to become undone causing them to fall in instead. Afterwards, Natsumi and Saki apologize make up with each other. Meanwhile, one of Natsumi's brother's friends, Yūsuke Kimura, is insistent that he saw Natsumi and the others flying.
3	"Sometimes Girls Fly in Shimoda" "Shimoda de wa Tokidoki Shōjo wa Sora o Tobu" (下田ではトキドキ少女は空をとぶ)	April 20, 2012
Natsumi hears from her brother Daiki about what Yūsuke claimed to have seen. As Natsumi advises the others to be careful about flying haphazardly, she and Saki make a little revenge wish to put Yuka and Rinko through what they went through the other day. As Yuka and Rinko find they are unable to get unstuck as easily as Natsumi and Saki did, Daiki and Yūsuke fall out with each other when Yūsuke takes his witch theory too far. Later, Saki runs into Yūsuke and hears about the troubles he is facing with no one believing him while Yuka and Rinko finally becoming unstuck after speaking with Daiki. In order to get Daiki and Yūsuke to make up, Saki decides she should fly once more to prove Yūsuke right. However, the rock fails to grant their wish to fly, leading the girls to realize they can't make the same wish twice. However, Natsumi manages to push Daiki to make up with Yūsuke on his own.
4	"Yuka At Full Tilt" "Yuka Masshigura" (ユカまっしぐら)	April 27, 2012
As Yuka learns that her cousin, Takashi Sano, who she has a crush on, has feelings for Saki, she unconsciously wishes she could be like Saki while sitting on the rock with Rinko. The rock's magic activates, causing Yuka to end up in Saki's body and vice versa. Yuka takes advantage of being in Saki's body to ask Takashi on a date, much to the displeasure of Saki. As the girls attempt to wish to return things back to normal, things only get worse Natsumi and Rinko end up switching bodies instead. The next day, Yuka goes with Takashi to the aquarium while Saki and the others follow after them. At the end of the date, Yuka comes to realise that it's Saki he likes and not her, while Rinko drags Yuka away before she and Takashi can kiss. As Yuka accepts the situation, everyone returns to their normal bodies before Saki sends a rejection text to Takashi.
5	"Summer Colds and Whales" "Natsukaze to Kujira" (夏風邪とクジラ)	May 4, 2012
After getting caught in the rain, Rinko ends up with a fever. With Rinko's parents going out for the day, Yuka cancels her plans to get a special poster in order to take care of Rinko. Meanwhile, Natsumi and Saki are invited by their seniors to have a practice doubles match against some talented players. After Rinko recovers from her cold, Yuka catches one of her own. As the others hang out without Yuka, they recall how it was because of Rinko's odd visions and Yuka's support that the four of them became friends and begin to threat what life will be like once Saki moves. Wanting Yuka to get better, the girls prepare to make a wish on the rock only for Yuka to show up back to health. After the girls accidentally tumble down some steps together, they all become able to see the whales Rinko sees in her daydreams.
6	"Natsumi's Doubles" "Natsumi no Daburusu" (夏海のダブルス)	May 11, 2012
As Natsumi has her hands full with tennis, studying and looking after Daiki while her mother's away, Yuka, Saki and Rinko make a wish on the rock which causes there to be two exactly alike Natsumis. While both are obviously displeased with the arrangement, the two Natsumis quickly start putting good use to the new development by using it to get things done, with one Natsumi doing tennis practice and the other doing homework and chores. However, as the day of the doubles match comes, the homework-chore Natsumi notices the tennis-playing Natsumi is pushing herself too much to become stronger. As the homework-chore Natsumi calls to the other to come to her senses, the magic wears off and the two Natsumis become one Natsumi again. Using both the training the tennis-playing Natsumi went through with the strategy the other learnt from Saki, Natsumi manages to put up a strong performance. Afterwards, the girl attend a festival to send off their wishes.
7	"A Wish on the Rain" "Ame ni Onegai" (雨にオネガイ)	May 18, 2012
As the town prepares for a festival, Natsumi is at odds with Yuka for not practicing for a talent competition. As Natsumi and Saki prepare for the competition and Yuka and Rinko get some last minute practise in, a sudden rainstorm appears, meaning the competition would be cancelled. Wanting the competition to go ahead, Rinko and Yuka decide to wish for the rain to stop, allowing the four to compete together and win the contest. Afterwards, they reveal it wasn't the rock they wished on, but some teru teru bozu Rinko's mother Sana made.
8	"Melancholy For Trips" "Yūutsu Fō Torippusu" (ゆううつフォートリップス)	May 25, 2012
As the girls debate going on a trip together before Saki moves, Natsumi suggests they go to Tokyo to see the island where Saki is moving to. As the girls prepare for the trip, Saki has a nightmare about being left behind by the others. The day of the trip comes and the girls soon arrive in Tokyo and board a ferry set to travel to the island overnight. As Saki once again experiences the same nightmare, Natsumi tries to get her to be more honest about her feelings of not wanting to move, even offering to speak with her parents upon their return to let Saki stay in Shimoda. Upon arriving at the island, Yuka almost drowns in the sea but is rescued by a lifeguard who acts hostile towards the girls.
9	"Saki on the Tip of the Sky of the Journey" "Tabi no Sora no Saki no Saki" (旅のソラのさきのさき)	June 1, 2012
Upon arriving at their accommodation, the girls meet Chiharu Okiyama, the twin sister of the lifeguard from earlier, Koharu. While trying to hide Saki from the neighbors in the hot springs, they inadvertently discover a wishing rock in the hot spring that causes Saki to turn invisible, unable to be seen or heard by the others. Later that night, as Natsumi talks with Yuka and Rinko about her desire to stop Saki from moving, they remind her that they'll still be friends regardless. The next day, the girls join Chiharu around the town. As they explore the hospital Saki's father will work at, Koharu becomes hostile towards them as he didn't want the doctor who used to work there to be replaced, but Chiharu assures her that she isn't the only one who misses him. As Saki comes to accept that she'll be moving here, she becomes visible again.
10	"Typhoon Ghosts, Today's Memories" "Taifu Yūrei, Kyō no Omoide" (たいふうゆうれい、今日のオモイデ)	June 8, 2012
As the city receives a typhoon alert, the girls recall an incident when they explored a supposedly haunted hotel. With no one quite sure of what actually happened, they try using the wishing rock to remember, although it doesn't appear to work at first. However, when they get home, they find that their younger selves from four years ago are walking about. The girls follow their younger selves as they prepare to explore the haunted hotel, oblivious to the time period they are in or the approaching typhoon. As they reach the hotel, the girls find their younger selves who, believing them to be ghosts, attack them and lock them in a room. There, they realize that their younger selves are here as a result of a wish on the rock they made to see what they were like four years later. As the typhoon soon appears, the young girls are put in a dangerous situation but are rescued by their older selves. After being brought to safety, the younger girls return to their own time, where they believed their older selves to be ghosts. Back in the present, Yuka brings up news of an idol audition they can partake in.
11	"Give it a Shot! Tokyo Cinderella Tour" "Atatte Kudakero! Tōkyō Shinderera Tsuā" (当たって砕けろ！東京シンデレラツアー)	June 22, 2012
After a bout of training, the girls soon head to Tokyo for their idol audition, where they get some last minute practice in. However, when they arrive, Yuka is suddenly overcome with nerves after witnessing the intensity of the rival competitors. Although the others assure her that she is what has made the summer vacation so far as unique as it is, Yuka is still nervous during the interview section and ends up falling down during the dance section. After failing the auditions, Yuka laments how she wanted to pass so they could stay together. After spending the rest of the day exploring Tokyo, they stop by a shrine where Saki mentions that she'll be moving on the day they return, making Natsumi wish summer vacation wouldn't end. Later in the evening, Natsumi catches a fever and mentions to Saki that she doesn't want her to leave. The next morning, the girls wake up to find they are suddenly back in Shimoda.
12	"Endless Summer Vacation" "Owaranai Natsu Yasumi" (終わらないナツヤスミ)	June 29, 2012
The girls soon realize they have gone back to the beginning of the previous day, which Yuka sees as a second chance to try and pass the audition, though it once again ends in failure. Later that day, they discover a shrine from the same family as Rinko's which has its own wishing rock and soon realize it has granted their wish for a never-ending summer vacation, which is proven when they end up looping the day over and over again. As they continue to loop, they forgo the audition and instead opt to try various other activities. After deciding they need to find a way to cancel the wish, Yuka theorizes that they may be able to escape the loop if they pass the audition. Although they manage to get through the audition, they still end up looping come midnight. Rinko then realizes they need to say goodbye to the miracles the wishing rock grants them. After spending one more day in Tokyo, the girls finally enter the next day. On the day of Saki's move, the girls gather around the rock one more time for one final wish: that the four of them will be friends forever.
OVA	"Our 15th Summer Vacation" "Jū-go-kaime no Natsu Yasumi" (15回目のナツヤスミ)	August 29, 2012
Four years after the series, the four girls reunite at the wishing rock to catch up on old times and talk about their plans for the future.
