= Sphere (group) =

Japanese pop band

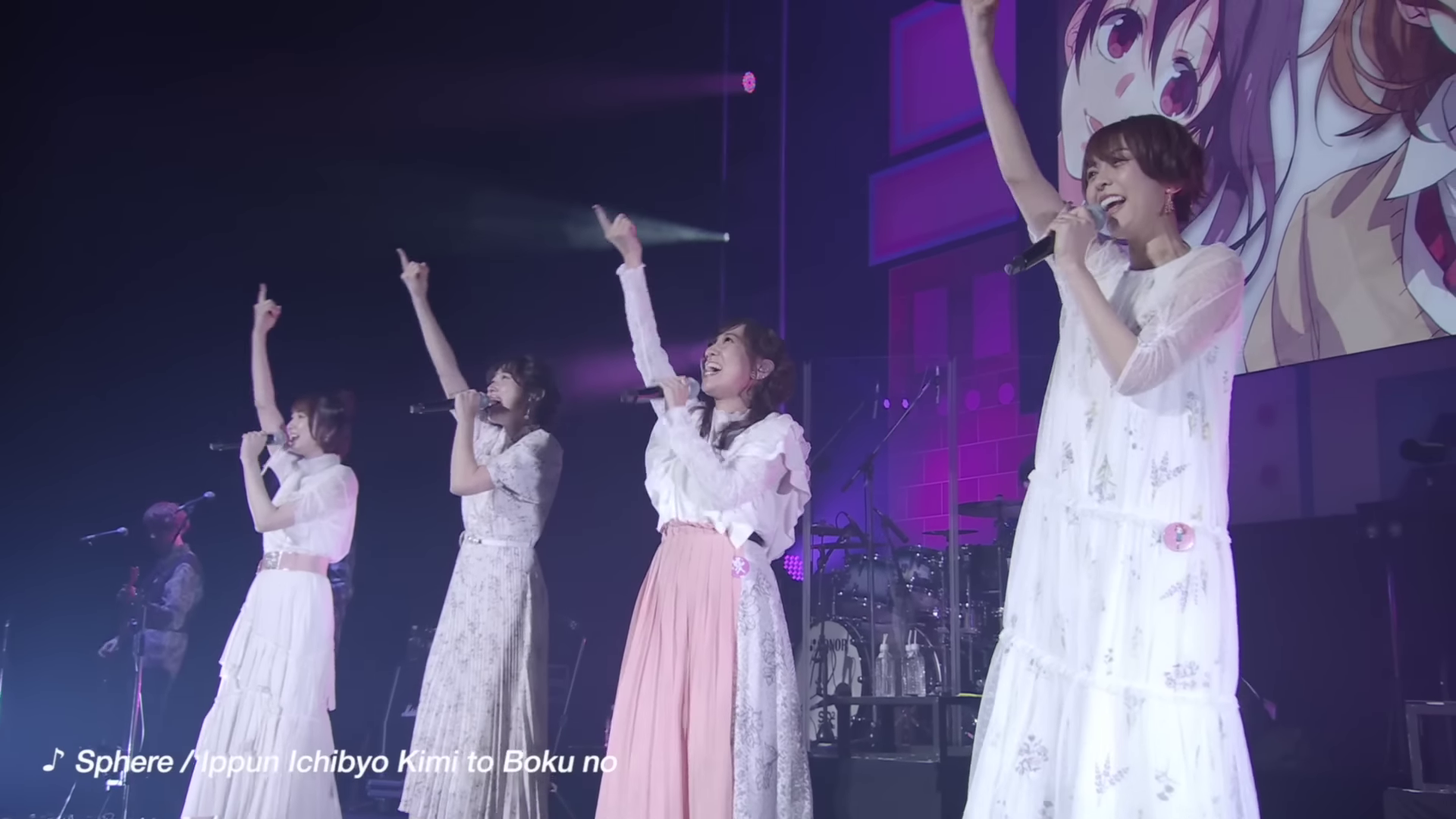
- Sphere at HoneyWorks Premium Live 2021

Background information
- Origin: Japan
- Genres: J-pop
- Years active: 2009–2017, 2019–
- Labels: Lantis, Music Ray'n
- Members: Haruka Tomatsu; Minako Kotobuki; Ayahi Takagaki; Aki Toyosaki
- Website: www.planet-sphere.jp

Sphere (スフィア) are a Japanese pop idol group made up of voice actresses who are all managed by Sony Music Entertainment's Music Ray'n subdivision, under the Lantis music label GloryHeaven. The group debuted in April 2009 releasing their first single "Future Stream", which was followed up with the June 2009 release of "Dangerous Girls" theme used in the opening animation of the PlayStation Portable game "Ken to Mahou Gakuen Mono 2" (known in the US as "Class of Heroes 2"). As all four are voice actresses, their music is frequently featured as theme songs to a variety of anime series, including First Love Limited, Sora no Manimani, Demon King Daimao, Shinryaku! Ika Musume, Asobi ni iku yo! and Ryūgajō Nanana no Maizōkin. The group features in the anime Natsuiro Kiseki, in which every member has a role as the four main characters. On March 4, 2017, the group announced to refrain from any group activities such as releasing new singles or doing concerts after their 2017 national tour ended, until the group's 10th anniversary in 2019. The members will keep doing their voice acting works and solo activities.

== Members ==
- Haruka Tomatsu
- Minako Kotobuki
- Ayahi Takagaki
- Aki Toyosaki

== Discography ==
=== Studio albums ===
Legend:	Special album

Year	Album details	Catalog no.			Oricon peak chart
Year	Album details	Regular edition	Limited edition	Limited edition (full)	Oricon peak chart
2009	A.T.M.O.S.P.H.E.R.E: Released: December 23, 2009; Label: Lantis	LASA-5026	LASA-35026/7	—N/a	19
2011	Spring is here: Released: March 16, 2011; Label: Lantis	LASA-5085	LASA-35085/6	LASA-35089-91	8
2012	Third Planet: Released: July 11, 2012; Label: Lantis	LASA-5131	LASA-35134/5	LASA-35131/2	3
2014	4 colors for you: Released: June 25, 2014; Label: Lantis	LASA-5153	LASA-35155/6	LASA-35153/4	7
2017	ISM: Released: February 1, 2017; Label: Lantis	LASA-5159	LASA-35161	LASA-35159	11
2019	10s: Sphere's 10th Anniversary Album; Released: May 8, 2019; Label: Lantis	LASA-5163	LASA-35163/4	—N/a	9

=== Compilation albums ===
Title	Album details	Catalog no.		Oricon peak chart
Title	Album details	Regular edition	Limited edition	Oricon peak chart
sphere	Sphere's 5th Fan Select Best Album; Released: February 11, 2015; Label: Lantis	LASA-5157	LASA-35157/8	7

=== Singles ===
- "Future Stream" (April 22, 2009)
- "Super Noisy Nova" (July 29, 2009)
- "Kaze o Atsumete/Brave My Heart" (November 25, 2009)
- "Realove:Realife" (April 21, 2010)
- "Now Loading... Sky!!" (July 28, 2010)
- "Moon Signal" (October 20, 2010)
- "Hazy" (May 5, 2011)
- "Let Me Do!!" (July 27, 2011)
- "High Powered" (October 26, 2011)
- "Non stop road/Ashita e no Kaerimichi" (April 25, 2012)
- "Pride on Everyday" (November 7, 2012)
- "Genesis Aria" (May 1, 2013)
- "Sticking Places" (November 27, 2013)
- "Eternal Tours" (February 26, 2014)
- "Kasukana Hisokana Tashikana Mirai" (May 14, 2014)
- "Jounetsu Continue" (February 11, 2015)
- "Vivid Brilliant Door" (July 15, 2015)
- "DREAMS, Count down!" (October 14, 2015)
- "My Only Place" (November 16, 2016)
- "Heart to Heart" (November 8, 2017)
- "best friends" (June 19, 2019)
- "Sign" (October 23, 2019)

=== DVD/Blu-ray ===
- 〜Sphere's rings live tour 2010〜 FINAL LIVE (January 1, 2011)
- スフィアライブ2010 sphere ON LOVE, ON 日本武道館 LIVE 【2枚組】(August 31, 2011)
- スフィア ライブ 2011 Athletic Harmonies -クライマックスステージ- LIVE (March 14, 2012)
- スフィア ライブ 2011 Athletic Harmonies -デンジャラスステージ- LIVE (March 14, 2012)
- Sphere Music Clips 2009-2012 (February 27,2013)
- ～Sphere's orbit live tour 2012 FINAL SPECIAL STAGE～ (March 27,2013)
- スフィアライブ2013 SPLASHMESSAGE !-サンシャインステージ(April 30, 2014)
- スフィアライブ2013 SPLASHMESSAGE -ムーンライトステージ (April 30, 2014)
- スタートダッシュミーティング Ready Steady 5周年！ in 日本武道館～いちにちめ～(November 5, 2014)
- スタートダッシュミーティング Ready Steady 5周年！ in 日本武道館～ふつかめ～ (November 5, 2014)
- ～Sphere’s eternal live tour 2014～ LIVE (April 22, 2015)
- Sphere BEST live 2015 ミッションイントロッコ!!!! -plan B-(August 28,2015)
- sphere music story 2015 DREAMS,Count down!!!! (July 6,2016)
- Sphere live tour 2017 “We are SPHERE!!!!!” (March 21, 2018)

=== Video games ===
- Ken to Maho Gakuen Mono 2 [Class of Heroes 2] (June 2009)

== See also ==
- Sphere Club, a Japanese television series featuring the members of Sphere
