= Ayahi Takagaki =

Japanese voice actress

- 高垣 彩陽
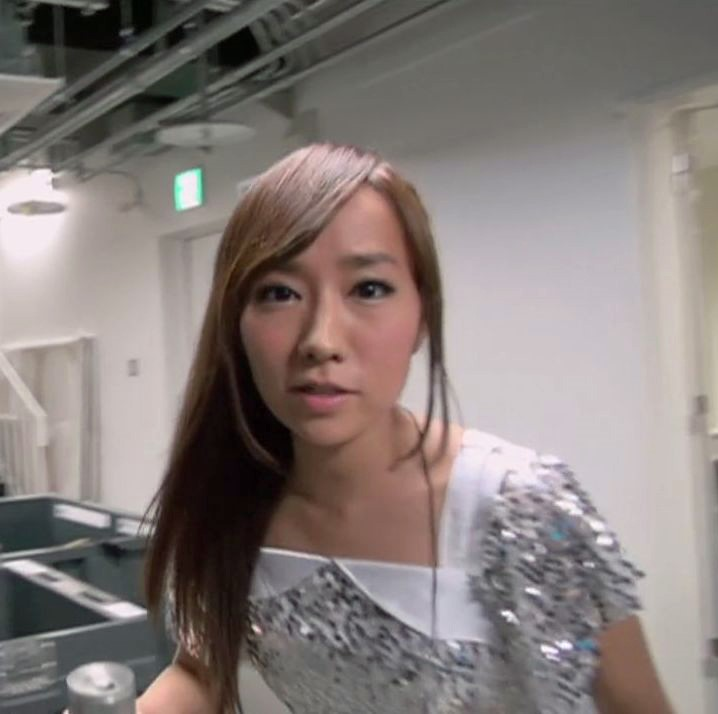
- Ayahi Takagaki in Sphere's eternal live tour 2014
- Born: October 25, 1985 (age 41); Tokyo, Japan
- Occupations: Actress; voice actress; singer
- Years active: 2006–present
- Agent: Music Ray'n
- Notable work: Durarara!! as Erika Karisawa; Tari Tari as Wakana Sakai; Symphogear as Chris Yukine; Heaven's Lost Property as Mikako Satsukitane; Sword Art Online as Lisbeth/Rika Shinozaki; The Seven Deadly Sins as Derieri
- Height: 150.8 cm (4 ft 11 in)
- Children: 1
- Musical career
- Genres: J-Pop; Anison
- Instrument: Vocals
- Years active: 2009–present
- Label: Sony Music Entertainment Japan / Music Ray'n
- Member of: Sphere
- Website: www.takagakiayahi.com

Ayahi Takagaki (高垣 彩陽, Takagaki Ayahi; born October 25, 1985) is a Japanese actress and singer. She had her first major voice acting roles in 2007, voicing Jasmine in Deltora Quest and Lucia Nahashi in Venus Versus Virus.

Her career as a musician began with her performance of the opening themes of the anime series First Love Limited in April 2009. In the same month, she and three other voice actresses debuted as the musical group Sphere with their single "Future Stream". She announced her marriage on her blog on August 22, 2019.

== Voice acting career ==
Takagaki has a fairly wide acting range, from little kids to romantic teens to gentle weak girls to elder sister types to proper young ladies to boyish girls to serious young women.

She had her first major role as voice actor in 2007, providing the voice of Jasmine, a main character of the anime series Deltora Quest. She was subsequently featured in Venus Versus Virus and Da Capo II as Lucia Nahashi and Asakura Otome, respectively., as well as Feldt Grace in Mobile Suit Gundam 00.

She went on to voice Noe Isurugi in the 2008 series True Tears and held a leading role in S · A: Special A, proving the voice of Megumi Yamamoto. She later took the roles of Nina Antalk, in Chrome Shelled Regios and Ein, in Phantom: Requiem for the Phantom, in 2008. Later that year, she was cast as Alesta Blanket in Fight Ippatsu! Jūden-chan!! and as Sumika Murasame, protagonist of Sasameki Koto. Takagaki also reprised her role as Feldt Grace in the second half of Mobile Suit Gundam 00.

In addition to voice acting, Takagaki has also appeared on camera. She, Aki Toyosaki, Haruka Tomatsu, and Minako Kotobuki appeared on the Anime Song Plus (アニソンぷらす, Anison Purasu) television show as a narrator on April 6, and as part of Sphere on April 20, 2009, and July 27, 2009, and by herself.

== Musical career ==
Takagaki graduated from a music college in Tokyo, with a major in operatic singing. Her first musical performance was the opening theme of the 2009 First Love Limited series, titled "Future Stream" with Aki Toyosaki, Haruka Tomatsu, and Minako Kotobuki. Shortly after, the four formed the musical group Sphere. They are affiliated with Music Ray'n, an artist management and publishing group of Sony Music Entertainment Japan. The theme was released as the group's first single on April 22, 2009. In July, the anime series Sora no Manimani debuted with the Sphere performed opening theme "Super Noisy Nova", which was released as a single on July 29, 2009. Sphere released their third single "It Raises the Wind/Brave my heart" on November 25, 2009. The group released their first album Atmosphere on December 23, 2009. After, the group performed "Realove:Realife", the opening theme of Ichiban Ushiro no Daimaō, which aired in April 2010.

== Filmography ==
=== Anime ===
2006

- Ouran High School Host Club – Tsubaki Kamigamo, Female college student, Benio's fan

2007

- Baccano! – Sylvie Lumiere
- Da Capo II – Asakura Otome
- Deltora Quest – Jasmine, Girl
- Mobile Suit Gundam 00 – Feldt Grace
- Venus Versus Virus – Lucia Nahashi
- Gakuen Utopia Manabi Straight! – Sweets student, Upper classman, Student
- Kenkō Zenrakei Suieibu Umishō – Asami Oyamada, Karenna Nanjō, Female student
- Goshūshō-sama Ninomiya-kun – Young Shungo, Boy
- Toward the Terra – Artella
- Hell Girl: Two Mirrors – Kitazaki

2008

- S · A: Special A – Megumi Yamamoto, Yuki-pon, Takishima family maid, and others
- Mobile Suit Gundam 00 Second Season – Feldt Grace
- Net Ghost PiPoPa – Azusa Sakamoto, Karin Yukitani, Pu/Seiren (singing voice)
- True Tears – Noe Isurugi
- Da Capo II Second Season – Asakura Otome
- Slayers Revolution – Girl
- Kyō no Go no Ni – Tsubasa Kawai
- Allison & Lillia – Meg
- Itazura na Kiss – Mari Horiuchi
- Pocket Monsters: Diamond & Pearl – Chinatsu (ep 76)
- Rental Magica – Male student, Female student
- Skip Beat! – Miya (ep 4)
- Macademi Wasshoi! – Baltia
- Ayakashi – Natsuhara
- Mokke – Gouda
- Battle Spirits: Shounen Toppa Bashin – Suiren, My Sunshine
- Yozakura Quartet – Mina Tatebayashi
- Hell Girl: Three Vessels – Jun Moriyama
- Our Home's Fox Deity. - Shunta Hashimoto (ep 22)

2009

- Chrome Shelled Regios – Nina Antalk
- Fight Ippatsu! Jūden-chan!! – Alesta Blanket
- Phantom: Requiem for the Phantom – Ein (Elen)
- Sasameki Koto – Sumika Murasame
- Heaven's Lost Property – Mikako Satsukitane
- Inazuma Eleven – Touko Zaizen
- Canaan – Nene
- Zan Sayonara Zetsubou Sensei – Oora Kanako
- Kobato. – Haruka
- Sora no Manimani – Miki Makita, Sayuri Minami
- Yumeiro Patissiere – Reiko-sensei(ep 6-7)
- Zoku Natsume Yūjin-chō – Midori
- Student Council's Discretion – Female student
- Maria-sama ga Miteru 4th Season - Miyuki

2010

- Durarara!! – Erika Karisawa
- The Qwaser of Stigmata – Ayana Minase
- Hanamaru Kindergarten – Hiiragi
- Transformers Animated – Arcee, Teletran I
- Occult Academy – Ami Kuroki
- The Legend of the Legendary Heroes – Ferris Eris
- Mitsudomoe – Mitsuba Marui
- Durarara!! Specials – Erika Karisawa
- Asobi ni Iku yo! – Ichika
- Heaven's Lost Property Forte – Mikako Satsukitane
- Mobile Suit Gundam 00 the Movie: Awakening of the Trailblazer – Feldt Grace

2011

- Blue Exorcist – Kuro
- Heaven's Lost Property the Movie: The Angeloid of Clockwork – Mikako Satsukitane
- Chihayafuru – Taichi Mashima (young)
- No. 6 – Ann (ep 5)
- Mitsudomoe Zouryouchuu! – Mitsuba Marui
- Mobile Suit Gundam AGE – Decil Galette
- Beelzebub – Kouta Kunieda, Nene Omori
- Inazuma Eleven GO – Kurama Norihito
- Manyuu Hikenchou – Kyouka Manyuu
- Nekogami Yaoyorozu – Yurara Makuragi
- Sket Dance – Kyouko Nanba (ep 36)
- Kamisama Dolls – Moyako Somaki
- Un-Go – Motoko Tanimura
- Softenni - Shiki Nishioka
- Pokémon the Movie: Black—Victini and Reshiram and White—Victini and Zekrom – Moguryuu

2012

- Daily Lives of High School Boys – Tadakuni's younger sister
- Natsuiro Kiseki – Saki Mizukoshi
- Symphogear – Chris Yukine
- Inazuma Eleven GO Chrono Stone – Kurama Norihito, Manto, Tasuke
- Tari Tari – Wakana Sakai
- Nekogami Yaoyorozu: Ohanami Ghostbusters (OVA) – Yurara Makuragi
- Natsuiro Kiseki: 15-kaime no Natsuyasumi (OVA) – Saki Mizukoshi
- Sword Art Online – Lisbeth/Rika Shinozaki
- Fate/Zero Second Season – Shirley
- Natsuyuki Rendezvous – Quiz Reporter
- Cardfight!! Vanguard Season 2: Asia Circuit – Takuto Tatsunagi
- Blue Exorcist: The Movie – Kuro
- Sword Art Offline -Lisbeth/Rika Shinozaki

2013

- Arata: The Legend – Kotoha
- Hakkenden: Eight Dogs of the East – Hamaji
- The World God Only Knows – Yui Goido, Mars
- Photo Kano – Yūko Uchida
- Senki Zesshō Symphogear G – Chris Yukine
- Silver Spoon – Tamako Inada
- Inazuma Eleven GO Galaxy – Mizukawa Minori, Lalaya Obies
- I Couldn't Become a Hero, So I Reluctantly Decided to Get a Job – Herself
- Non Non Biyori – Honoka Ishikawa (ep 4)
- Koitabi: True Tours Nanto – Aoi Shindou
- Log Horizon – Henrietta
- Gaist Crusher – Luminella Hotaru
- Chihayafuru 2 – Rion Yamashiro
- Wanna be the Strongest in the World – Jumbo Yamamoto
- Yozakura Quartet ~Hana no Uta~ – Mina Tatebayashi
- Yozakura Quartet: Tsuki ni Naku – Mina Tatebayashi
- Cardfight!! Vanguard Season 3: Link Joker – Takuto Tatsunagi, Student B
- Magi: The Kingdom of Magic – Myron Alexius
- Sanjougattai Transformers Go! – Tobio Fuuma

2014

- Inazuma Eleven GO Galaxy – Seren Melvil, Despina Laks
- Blade & Soul – Dan Roana
- Black Butler: Book of Circus – Doll/Freckles
- Heaven's Lost Property Final – The Movie: Eternally My Master – Mikako Satsukitane
- Gundam Reconguista in G – Manny Anbasada, Nobell
- Sword Art Online II – Lisbeth/Rika Shinozaki
- Spo-chan Taiketsu: Youkai Daikessen – Jin
- Tokyo Ghoul – Itori
- Terra Formars (OVA) – Zhang Ming-Ming
- Log Horizon 2 – Henrietta
- Akatsuki no Yona – Son Hak (young)
- Girlfriend (Kari) – Tsugumi Harumiya

2015

- Durarara!!x2 Shou – Erika Karisawa
- Durarara!!x2 Shou: Watashi no Kokoro wa Nabe Moyou – Erika Karisawa
- Tokyo Ghoul √A - Ayato Kirishima (childhood; ep 5)
- Magic Kaito 1412 – Megumi Furuhata (ep.17)
- JoJo's Bizarre Adventure: Stardust Crusaders – Mariah (ep 30-32)
- Dog Days" – Farine
- Vampire Holmes – Holmes' house cat Kira & Christina
- Jewelpet: Magical Change – Larimer
- Re-Kan! – Yuuki Inoue
- Symphogear GX – Chris Yukine
- Ultimate Otaku Teacher – Tim Berners Lynn
- Plastic Memories – Sarah (ep 10-12)
- Durarara!!x2 Ten – Erika Karisawa
- Ushio and Tora – Jun Moritsuna

2016

- Norn 9 - Mikoto Kuga
- Gate 2nd Season - Arpeggio El Lelena
- Haruchika - Makoto Yamanobe (ep 11)
- Durarara!!x2 Ketsu - Erika Karisawa
- Neko mo, Onda-ke - Natsuko Onda & Sachiko Onda
- The Morose Mononokean - Zenko Fujiwara
- Ushio & Tora 2nd Season - Jun Moritsuna
- Gintama°: Aizome Kaori-hen (OVA) - Hotaru

2017

- Sword Art Online The Movie: Ordinal Scale - Lisbeth/Rika Shinozaki
- Blue Exorcist: Kyoto Impure King Arc - Kuro
- Fukumenkei Noise, Miou Suguri
- Kirakira PreCure a la Mode, Crystal Bunny
- Senki Zesshō Symphogear AXZ – Chris Yukine
- Two Car – Hitomi Iseki
- Land of the Lustrous – Jade
- Garo: Vanishing Line - Meifang

2018

- The Seven Deadly Sins: Revival of The Commandments - Derieri
- Sword Art Online: Alicization - Lisbeth/Rika Shinozaki
- Tokyo Ghoul:re - Itori

2019

- Kakegurui XX - Sumika Warakubami
- Star Twinkle PreCure - Kaede Amamiya
- Senki Zesshō Symphogear XV – Chris Yukine

2020

- Somali and the Forest Spirit – Praline
- Auto Boy - Carl from Mobile Land – Carl

2021

- Idoly Pride – Aoi Igawa
- Log Horizon: Destruction of the Round Table – Henrietta
- Mars Red – Misaki
- Tropical-Rouge! Pretty Cure – Elda

2022

- Healer Girl – Ria Karasuma
- Crayon Shin-chan: Mononoke Ninja Chinpūden – Chinzō Hesogakure
- Nights with a Cat – Kyuruga
- Akiba Maid War – Cafe Manager
- Arknights: Prelude to Dawn – Frostnova

2023

- Urusei Yatsura – Ryunosuke
- Make My Day – Marie

2024

- Sengoku Youko – Mountain God
- Seirei Gensouki: Spirit Chronicles 2nd Season – Aria Govemess

2025

- Hell Teacher: Jigoku Sensei Nube – Shuichi Shirato
- Gachiakuta – Cthoni
- Umamusume: Cinderella Gray – Michelle My Baby

=== Video games ===
- Imabikisou (2007) – Ami
- Mobile Suit Gundam 00 Gundam Meisters (2008) – Feldt Grace
- Da Capo II: Plus Situation (2008) – Asakura Otome
- Harvest Moon DS: Grand Bazaar (2008) – Freya, Saniya
- Happy Dance Collection (2008) – Ari Tomiga
- Dungeons and Dam (2009) – Fear
- Saikin Koi Shiteru? (2009) - Miharu Sakurano
- Sekirei: Gifts from the Future (2009) – Yahan
- Heaven's Lost Property Forte: Dreamy Season (2011) – Mikako Satsukitane
- Girlfriend (Kari) (2012) – Tsugumi Harumiya
- Guilty Crown: Lost Christmas (2012) – Past
- ZombiU (2012) - Sondra Kelley (Japanese dub)
- Photo Kano Kiss (2013) – Yuko Uchida
- Norn9 (2013) – Mikoto Kuga
- Sword Art Online: Infinity Moment (2013) – Lisbeth
- Norn9 Var Commons (2014) – Mikoto Kuga
- Sword Art Online: Hollow Fragment (2014) – Lisbeth
- Super Heroine Chronicle (2014) – Chris Yukine
- Norn9 Last Era (2015) – Mikoto Kuga
- Sword Art Online: Lost Song (2015) – Lisbeth
- Kobayashi ga Kawai Sugite Tsurai!! (2015) – Megumu Kobayashi and Mitsuru Kobayashi
- JoJo's Bizarre Adventure: Eyes of Heaven (2015) - Mariah
- Sword Art Online: Hollow Realization (2016) – Lisbeth
- Granblue Fantasy (2016) – Nemone, Garuda
- Horizon Zero Dawn (2017) – Aloy (Japanese dub)
- Senki Zesshō Symphogear XD Unlimited (2017) – Chris Yukine
- Marvel's Spider-Man (2018) – Black Cat/Felicia Hardy
- Onmyoji (2018) – Senhime
- The Seven Deadly Sins: Grand Cross (2019) - Derieri
- Idoly Pride (2021) – Aoi Igawa
- Fire Emblem Heroes (2021) – Dagr
- JoJo's Bizarre Adventure: All Star Battle R (2022) – Mariah
- Horizon Forbidden West (2022) – Aloy (Japanese dub)
- Sword Art Online: Last Recollection (2023) – Lisbeth
- Inazuma Eleven: Victory Road (2025) - Hoshi Mikana

=== Dubbing ===
==== Live-action ====
- 10,000 BC (Evolet (Camilla Belle))
- The Broken Hearts Gallery (Lucy Gulliver (Geraldine Viswanathan))
- Euphoria (Rue Bennett (Zendaya))
- Gossip Girl (2007) (Sage (Sofia Black-D'Elia))
- Gossip Girl (2021) (Monet de Haan (Savannah Lee Smith))
- Hearts Beat Loud (Sam Fisher (Kiersey Clemons))
- Iris (Kim Hyun-jun (young) and later Yang Mi-jung (Hyun Jyu-ni))
- It Chapter Two (Adult Beverly Marsh (Jessica Chastain))
- Power Rangers Mystic Force (Clare/the Gatekeeper (Antonia Prebble))
- Scream 4 (Kirby Reed (Hayden Panettiere))
- Scream VI (Kirby Reed (Hayden Panettiere))
- Sucker Punch (Amber (Jamie Chung))
- Terminator: Dark Fate (Daniella "Dani" Ramos (Natalia Reyes))
- We Are Lady Parts (Saira (Sarah Kameela Impey))

==== Animation ====
- Epic (Mary Katherine)
- Smurfs: The Lost Village (Smurfwillow)
- Tinpo (Dougpo)
- Transformers: EarthSpark (Robby Malto)
- My Little Pony: Friendship Is Magic (Princess Cadance)

==== Video games ====
- Spider-Man 2 (Black Cat)

=== Photobooks ===
Release date	Title
December 15, 2011	Sunlight Note
December 24, 2015	Ayahitori Tabi

== Discography ==
=== Albums ===
Release date	Title	Catalog No.		Oricon Weekly Charts
Release date	Title	Limited edition	Regular edition	Oricon Weekly Charts
April 17, 2013	Relation	SMCL-291~2	SMCL-293	8
November 25, 2015	Individual	SMCL-406~7	SMCL-408	25

=== Solo mini-albums ===
Release date	Title	Catalog No.	Oricon Weekly Charts
November 23, 2011	Melodia	SMCL-253	28
December 11, 2013	Melodia 2	SMCL-316	30
November 9, 2016	Melodia 3	SMCL-448	21

=== Solo singles ===
Release date	Title	Catalog no.		Oricon Weekly Charts	Notes	Album
Release date	Title	Limited edition	Regular edition	Oricon Weekly Charts	Notes	Album
July 21, 2010	Kimi ga Iru Basho (君がいる場所)	SMCL-198/9	SMCL-200	14	Ending theme for the anime Seikimatsu Occult Gakuin	Relation
November 17, 2010	Hikari no Fillment (光のフィルメント)	SMCL-222/3	SMCL-224	20	Ending theme for the anime Densetsu no Yuusha no Densetsu	Relation
April 6, 2011	Takaramono (たからもの)	SMCL-235/6	SMCL-237	15	-	Relation
February 8, 2012	Meteor Light	SMCL-257/8	SMCL-259	15	Ending theme for the anime Senki Zesshou Symphogear	Relation
June 13, 2012	Tsuki no Namida (月のなみだ)	SMCL-270/1	SMCL-272	19	Opening theme for PSP game Juzaengi: Engetsu Sangokuden	Relation
August 14, 2013	Next Destination	SMCL-303/4	SMCL-305	12	Ending theme for the anime Senki Zesshou Symphogear G	Individual
May 28, 2014	Kaze ni Naru (風になる)	SMCL-334/5	SMCL-336	25	Ending theme for PSP game Juzaengi: Engetsu Sangokuden 2	Individual
October 8, 2014	Ai no Hi (愛の陽)	SMCL-353/4	SMCL-355	16	-	Individual
July 29, 2015	Rebirth-day	SMCL-393/4	SMCL-395	10	Ending theme for the anime Senki Zesshou Symphogear GX	Individual
January 18, 2017	Live & Try	SMCL-463/4	SMCL-465	23	-	
August 2, 2017	Futurism	SMCL-495/8	SMCL-497	15	Ending Theme for the anime Senki Zesshou Symphogear AXZ	
August 21, 2019	Lasting Song			15	Ending Theme for the anime Senki Zesshou Symphogear XV	

=== Concerts ===
Year	Title	Notes
2012	Takagaki Ayahi 1st Concert Tour "Memoria×Melodia"	Solo Concert
2013	Takagaki Ayahi 2nd Concert Tour: Relation of Colors	Solo Concert
2014	Symphogear Live 2013	Anime Concert
2016	Takagaki Ayahi 3rd Concert Tour: Individual	Solo Concert
2016	Symphogear Live 2016	Anime Concert
2018	Symphogear Live 2018	Anime Concert
