= List of Chrome Shelled Regios characters =

Below is a list of characters in Chrome Shelled Regios, from the novel, the anime, and the various manga adaptations.

The cast of Chrome Shelled Regios. (Top) L-R: Dinn Dee, Dalsiena Che Matelna, Sharnid Elipton, Shante Laite (Middle) L-R: Nina Antalk, Layfon Alseif, Felli Loss, Mayshen Torinden, Gorneo Lueckens (Bottom) L-R: Kalian Loss, Harley Sutton, Leerin Marfes, Mifi Rotten, Naruki Gelni

== 17th Platoon ==
=== Layfon Wolfstein Alseif ===
Voiced by: Nobuhiko Okamoto (Japanese); Todd Haberkorn (English)
Weapon of choice: Sword, Broad sword, Guan Dao, Steel threads and Katana
The main protagonist of the series In the novel, he is described as having tea-colored hair and blue eyes. He was one of the twelve wielders of the Heaven's Blades and also held the title of Wolfstein at the age of ten.
He and Leerin were found by Derk Saiharden during their early childhood and taken to the orphanage in Glendan. Due to Derk's inability to earn enough money (because of his old age and the fact that he had retired from the battlefront), Layfon decided to earn money fighting in matches in order to provide for themselves and the other orphans. He began to participate in illegal underground matches to earn even more money for the orphanage. His high levels of strong kei and fast mastery of combat techniques earned him a place amongst the ranks of the elite Heaven's Blade wielders at the age of ten, having been given the title "Wolfstein". His Heaven's Blade was a powerful longsword made of white DITE. Eventually, Gahard Barehn challenged Layfon for his title, secretly blackmailing him to lose with the threat of exposing his participation in the underground matches. During their battle, Layfon cut off Barehn's arm, though he had actually been intending to kill him in order to keep his secret safe. As the match had been overseen by Queen Alsheyra, she ordered his immediate arrest and capture in response to his actions. His having taken part in underground matches was later exposed, and he was stripped of his title and exiled from Glendan as a result. He went to start his life anew in Zuellni, determined to put fighting and military arts behind him.
He entered the Academy City of Zuellni as a General Education student with a D-rank scholarship. On the day of the academy's opening ceremonies, however, he attracted attention by unintentionally showing off some of his martial arts skills. In the manga, he throws two Military Arts students to the ground as a reflex to being shoved; in the anime, he saves Meishin from being crushed under falling rubble as a result of two Military Arts students fighting. He was forced to join the Military Arts after Kalian Loss, head of the Student Council, blackmails him into joining as he knows about Layfon's past, and publicly upgrades his scholarship to rank A, which automatically waives his tuition fees. Incidentally, Kalian was already aware of Layfon's abilities from having seen him fighting a filth monster while on a transit bus to Glendan several years ago.
Layfon has extremely high combat capabilities, as can be inferred from his past as a Heaven's Blade wielder, and also has the innate ability to break down kei techniques and use them just by observation. He mastered all the Phyharden skills in a short period of time and learned the secret techniques of the Luskans that even Savaris was proud of, the Thousand Men Rush and Killer Roar (Houkeisatsu).
Due to his birthplace, Glendan, being heavily involved in fighting Filth Monsters, he and fighters there developed with a 'win or die' philosophy. One either fight and become stronger or die. Consequently, he deliberately holds back in battles at Zuellni in order to conceal his past with unsuccessful attempts. He said that for him, the entire field is too narrow for him later on to Nina, which made sense since most of the matured pollutant beasts are huge and takes lots of effort to take down.
Felli mentions that he has a large amount of kei when he was unconsciously asleep after knocked out by Nina. Some of his abilities include being able to move at high speed which can harm a normal person's body, he could catch up with the rest of the martial artists while he went to escort Feli since she couldn't travel at the speed of martial artists. All the while he states that he is not moving at a high speed due to Feli's body conditions. This also enable him to use a technique to create illusory clones due to speed. Layfon currently works at a machinery cleaning job with Nina in the evening, which has bad working condition and hours but generous pay. His goal is still to find a dream outside of fighting, a decision made as a result of being exiled from Glendan.
Layfon's weapon of choice is a sword. In the past, his Heaven's Blade was shown to be a huge sword as large as his height with exquisite design on the body. His weapon at Zullini before reclaiming the use of katana is a turquoise sword made by Harley, using green DITE.
He refused the katana DITE that Leerin delivered to him after their reunion at Zullini and had a huge argument with her. However, later on, he forgave himself and told Harley and Chilieck to change all his DITEs to a katana shape. His turquoise sword was transformed into a short thick knife with the primary settings of steel thread. During the larvae attack, Layfon requested Harley to add another setting on the sword that would produce an unknown number of golden wires that were razor sharp or as soft as a rope from the hilt. Layfon restores the sword by saying "Restoration 01" and the steel threads with "Restoration 02."
Harley gave Layfon a separate DITE before he went to go fight the matured Pollutant Beast alone. This heavier, black blade, called Adamandite, was made to handle Layfon's kei better by combining several DITEs together and is able to create blasts of air with just a swing, humorously causing Felli's hair to become messy when Layfon first tries it out. It is restored with the phrase, "Restoration A-D" and also retains the first two settings of his older DITE. Adamandite has only been used with stronger Pollutant Beasts so far. (He faced Haia with the simple adamandite).
Layfon has broken his DITE numerous times: he burned it out after the first inter-platoon match, burned out the Adamandite after defeating the matured Pollutant Beast, and had it broken by Haia during their first encounter. All this was due to his immense kei quantity and velocity which only a Heaven's Blade can withstand. Harley and Chilieck (the creator of Adamandite, who does not appear in the anime) are currently working on it so Layfon can fight with the most advantage he has, his enormous amount of kei.
In the anime, after receiving the DITE from Leerin, Layfon then combined both the Heaven's Blade sword and his Phyharden katana to create a katana form of his Heaven's Blade, which also had a larger form that allowed Layfon to stand on for aerial purposes. He used it to defeat attacking Heaven's Blade Wielder Savaris, who was also currently possessed by the Haikizoku, with ease. When the battle against the Dying Slave is finally over, Lintens Savoled Harden takes back Layfon's Heaven's Blade without any opposition.
In the novel, Lintens stated Layfon was the only one he acknowledged as his apprentice. He revealed that no one was better in understanding kei techniques than Layfon and that he had stolen skills from all Glendan's dojos. Layfon seems to have a great learning ability. Lintens states that he was surprised on how Layfon could grasp moves just by observing them.: During a meeting, it was revealed by Haia Salinban Lyia that Layfon uses the Saiharden style, a style widely used among mercenaries due to its efficient and practical way. Phyharden is not a big dojo, but due to the Salivan Mercenary group, it's renowned throughout the land. His primary weapon when he started learning Martial Arts is a katana instead of a regular sword. He was taught these techniques by his sensei and adopted father Derk, and since Haia's sensei studied alongside Layfon's, Haia and Layfon are cousin apprentices. Layfon has refused to use a katana for he does not want to stain the skills of Physharded with his hands because he became the Heaven's Blade for money to feed all orphans in Glendan. In the anime, Layfon fought Haia with his regular DITE, breaking Haia's katana and injuring him in the process.
In the novel, however, he used the simple adamandite katana to fight Haia when he kidnapped Felli and request Layfon do use katana (compare to the adamandite which can change into various weapons, the simple adamandite only has one form which is a katana, but it's more stable and stronger than an adamandite that can change forms.) He first helped Zullini to win the war by breaking the flag of the opponent city with the price of his wrist almost being cut off by Haia, then defeats Haia. This made Haia feel greatly insulted, but Savaris claimed that Layfon has weakened and dulled in the peaceful Zullini and that he shouldn't have been injured. "Salinban Mercenary Training Group, Move Out!" Layfon asked Felli to record the Salinban Mercenary Training Group fighting the Pollutant Beasts in order to help the rest of the platoon study their movements so that they could fight together in the future.
In the novel, Layfon's way of thinking is visited. He actually responded with his fist to aggression. He was used to being subjected to jealous older fighters for being stronger and a kid. He doesn't mind about having enemies. He is very smart when in perceiving people's kei but not so with detecting girls' feelings; he does not detect Leerin, Nina, Felli and Meishen's feelings for him. He admires Nina because she is strong-willed. He is stated not to be particularly keen with studies by the Queen. When he fight for others, he can be very determined and strong. Both he and Leerin, his childhood friend, wish to be reunited again on the soils of Glendan.
The queen assessed Layfon at the end of Volume 12 by stating that his before his exile, his skills and manipulation of kei has always been a notch below the other Heaven's Blade Receivers (probably due to inexperience), but his inherent sheer quantity of kei, his recovery of kei (something Savaris confirmed), and his endurance with kei were considered amongst the best, even among the Heaven's Blades receivers. However, in the end of the story, the queen says that her life is meaningless without twelve Heaven's Blades and hinted Layfon and all people related had been forgiven by the Royal family and so Layfon returns one of The Heaven's Blades. By the end of the light novel, Layfon and Felli leave together to go on a mission. It is hinted that they get married.
In Chrome Shelled Regios the manga, which was drawn from Nina's point of view, he is seen playing with training balls. She stated how he has trouble using his sword in a team. He is very strong in this manga. For example, he went to find water to stop a fire and ended up throwing a water tank from another building in the classroom's window. He can sometimes be very honest when he talks. Layfon's often seen smiling or confused. That is how people usually see him: polite, but while fighting, he is quite expressionless. The difference between these two states surprised Naruki as she trained with him for the first time, she also finds some sadness in him. Savaris stated that he had weakened after being expelled from Grenden, but since Layfon wasn't fully concentrated and the fact that Savaris doesn't know Layfon's intention and struggles, the opinion might not be fully accurate.

=== Nina Antalk ===
Voiced by: Ayahi Takagaki (Japanese); Brina Palencia (English)
Weapon of choice: Iron Whips
Nina is the leader/captain of the 17th Platoon and forcibly recruits Layfon into her platoon at the start of the anime series. She has blond, golden in the novel, hair and blue eyes. Her dedication caused her to get angry a lot in the first part of the series, especially when one of her squad members are late. She was born to a martial artist family and wanted to see the outside world, causing her to run away from home. When she was a child, she had attempted to protect an Electric Fairy from a Hunter. During this incident, she was knocked down a hole and was on the verge of death. However, an Electric Fairy sacrificed herself to save Nina by passing on its life force. Originally, she relied too heavily on Layfon to win matches, causing a loss with another platoon. Since then, she snuck out to the edge of the barrier to practice her kei. This combined with her standard training, practice, matches, and work caused her to overuse her kei and to faint, at which point Layfon stepped in and trained her. He taught her Kongoukei, the signature skill of Heaven's Blade Revers. Nina has romantic feelings for Layfon but refuses to admit it. It's only after that her mental mind was reduced to five years old due to a drug that she has taken, she admits that she likes Layfon which irritated Leerin a lot. Later she was shown by Dickserio Muscaine his signature skill, "Thunder Flash". Dickserio told her that this would be delivered to her specially, sure enough, because Layfon later taught her Thunder Rush without knowing where he learned it.
Her DITEs are a pair of singlesticks, labelled as "iron whips" in the novels, made from black DITE. Nina has promised to protect Zuellini, and thus felt that losing any battle is not an option. This causes her to over-exert herself time and time again. Still, her commitment has earned the respect of her team members. After Zuellni goes berserk, Nina goes to find Zuellni as per Layfon's request. Then she encounters the Haikizoku, who reacts to her will to protect the city and possesses her. Nina wakes up to find herself teleported to the city Myath. There, she meets and becomes friends with Leerin Marfes and also encounters the Masked Wolf troops from before. Soon afterwards, the Haikizoku resurfaces, and Myath instructs Leerin on how to save Nina. As a result, Nina reappears in the middle of a desert and is picked up by Layfon. Upon returning to Zuellni, Nina is unable to confess her situation to her friends, but Layfon believed in her regardless.
In the anime, not long after, the Haikizoku forces Nina to go outside and dons her with a mask. The 17th Platoon deploys in order to find her, with Layfon finding her first. Nina attacks Layfon under the Haikizoku's trance and defeated after Layfon pulls off her mask. :In the anime following this battle, Layfon leaves her with the rest of the 17th Platoon to combat the Pollutant Beast.
In the anime, Savaris Qaulafin Lueckens makes his move and kidnaps Nina. To force the Haikizoku out, he planned to torture her and even kill her until Layfon came to her rescue. Nina has a hard time with her team, in the novel she stated about the trouble with Felli, Sharnid and Layfon was their morale. There is also a good possibility that after Nina becomes able to talk to the Haikizoku, she comes to possess a Heaven's Blade, one that is not one of the twelve in Glendan but one created especially for her using Zuellni's power.

=== Felli Loss ===
Voiced by: Mai Nakahara (Japanese); Monica Rial (English)
Weapon of choice: Wand
The psychokinesis user of the 17th Platoon and a second year. She has silvery hair and grey eyes. She rarely speaks and shows little emotion due to the habit of a psychokinesis user, the brain of a psychokinesis user automatically rejects unnecessary or irrelevant information other than the required ones. Like most psychokinesis users, Felli's brain receives a great influx of information, and is able to handle the strain of responding to every bit of information. Layfon stated that the psychokinesis users have a different brain structure that allows them to process and simulate the huge sum of information in a short period of time. Because of this, she has a hard time making common facial expressions, such as smiling. She is also the sister of the head of the student council, Kalian Loss, whom she despises for making her attend the Military Arts section, just as he did with Layfon. She works part time at a cafe which Sharnid recommended, where the waitresses dress up as maids. In the anime, she kicks Layfon in the shin every time he does something wrong and will also hit her brother whenever he's being too noisy. After learning of Layfon's nickname "Lay-ton", she insisted on calling him "Fon-Fon." And becomes mad if Layfon call her "senior" (English) / "senpai" (Japanese). (She insists on being called Felli). She also has taken a liking to Layfon in a romantic sense, showing clear signs of jealousy by copying Shante's little act by riding on Layfon's shoulders and blushing while Layfon teaches her how to swim. When she discovers Leerin's letter, she shows slight jealousy and attempted to press the matter but was to reluctant in the end. Additionally, after Layfon is hospitalized, Felli comes with flowers. She ends up keeping them because she spots flowers already delivered by Nina, making Felli react in a childish and jealous manner. She tried to make desserts for Layfon at Valentines and forced Kalian to try it; the unfortunate brother had a day off miserably sick with Felli exclaiming "Brother is too fragile."
Felli is described as one of the most talented psychokinesis users. Her DITE is a wand which holds many petal shaped pieces that are grey when inactive and are pink when active. These petals are utilized to send out telepathic messages to others. They can also transform into offensive daggers or explode, an ability named psychokinesis mine, if necessary. Felli is also capable of synchronizing with other people's pins to make up for distances she cannot cover. She, like Layfon, dislikes fighting and almost never tries when it comes to combat. However, when the order was given to retrieve Nina before the Kei-Ra Cannon fired again, her brother wanted her to stay. In contrast to her past actions, Felli nearly attacked her brother to force him to let her go. With the display of her newly found will to protect the city, Felli showed that she had grown after meeting Layfon.

=== Sharnid Elipton ===
Voiced by: Kishô Taniyama (Japanese); Eric Vale (English)
Weapon of choice: Sniper Rifle, Dual Pistols
A fourth-year student and oldest of the 17th Platoon. He has strawberry blond hair and green eyes. Sharnid is an excellent sharpshooter who is usually laid back and enjoys teasing other people. His ability to conceal his kei is excellent among the student of Zuellni, however he was unsuccessful when he tried to tail Layfon and Leerin. He appears to have playboy-tendencies saying stuff like "you won't understand the night life of an attractive man". He is usually late for his platoon training. His main DITE is a rifle, but he later obtains two close quarters pistols from Harley in order to take up multiple roles in their small platoon. He wields his dual pistols in Gun Kata-like stances. It is revealed that he was originally a part of 10th Platoon, but left because he felt as though he would have lost them. Sharnid asked his former teammate, Siena, to help him in a match after Layfon's injuries. Although he is a playboy, he does seem to care and have genuine feelings for Siena.

=== Harley Sutton ===
Voiced by: Daisuke Sakaguchi (Japanese); Greg Ayres (English)
The same age as Nina, and DITE-mechanic of the 17th Platoon, who does not participate in combat. He has green hair and grey eyes. He is Nina's childhood friend. Harley is also in charge of creating DITEs for the platoon in the anime, including Layfon's turquoise sword and Sharnid's dual pistols, and the adjustment for DITEs. He and Chilieck created the adamandite and is currently working on improving it so Layfon can fight with his real strength. Harley specializes in weapon adjustment so weapons best fit their owners. In Glendan, Harley's specialization would class him as a DITE Engineer.

== Citizens of Zuellni ==
=== Kalian Loss ===
Voiced by: Takehito Koyasu (Japanese); Jerry Jewell (English)
Head of the student council and the older brother of Felli Loss. He is willing to do anything to protect the city, even sacrifice his own sister to accomplish his goal of spreading Zuellni's influence. Kalian's leadership skill is very good, as seen in his ability to give excellent speeches. It is shown that he does genuinely care for his sister, but his worrying over a possible relationship between Felli and Layfon caused him to greatly overreact.

=== Mayshen Torinden ===
Voiced by: Asuka Ōgame (Japanese); Leah Clark (English)
A first year student of the Liberal Arts Department. A gentle and timid girl to the point of fault with long black hair, she gets extremely shy when she sees or even just thinks of Layfon. Due to her extremely timid nature she rarely talks and her speech is often stuttered and fragmented. She developed feelings for Layfon after being rescued by him at the inauguration ceremony but has yet to willingly confront him and instead leaves baskets of sandwiches for him at his room. She is a good cook who desires to one day become a baker. During episode 15 she found out about Layfon's past and caused him to be severely injured after a bridge they were standing on collapsed. Layfon saved her at the cost of being stabbed by debris.

=== Mifi Rotten ===
Voiced by: Eri Sendai (Japanese); Brittney Karbowski (English)
A first year student of the Liberal Arts Department. A blonde girl with two pony-tails, she is Mayshen and Naruki's best friend that has given them the nicknames "Meicchi" and "Nakki" respectively. Curious and inquisitive, she got interested in Layfon instantly at the inauguration ceremony. Her dream is to be a reporter someday so she work on a part time at the editing team of a magazine called "Weekly Look-On." Mifi came up with the nickname "Lay-fy" (English) / "Lay-ton" (Japanese) for Layfon, and since then, Mayshen, Mifi and Naruki all refer to him by this nickname.

=== Vanze Haldey ===
Voiced by: Youji Ueda (Japanese); John Burgmeier (English)
Captain of the 1st Platoon and the head of military arts. He helps out the president with issues concerning maintenance and budgets. His DITE is a large sword with a somewhat curved tip. He was strong enough to finish off a Pollutant Beast immobilized by Felli and take down Nina in the inter-platoon match.

== 10th Platoon ==
=== Dinn Dee ===
Voiced by: Kousuke Toriumi (Japanese); Newton Pittman (English)
Captain of the 10th Platoon, which is now implied to be disbanded or inactive. He, Sharnid, and Siena were best friends in the past and worked so well together that they were seen as the "knight of a new generation." He vowed to the former captain to protect Zuellni along with Sharnid and Siena after their loss to Gandoweria, wearing the captain's cartilage earring as a symbol of the vow. After Sharnid left the platoon, Dinn challenged Sharnid to a duel, in which Sharnid did not fight back at all. The platoon's overall rank dramatically dropped with Sharnid's absence.
In order to overthrow Vanze, he used Overload, a type of drug, to get stronger. Nonetheless, he was still beaten by Layfon in the inter-platoon match. Consequently, he was possessed by the Haikizoku and nearly taken away by Haia. The Haikizoku leaves his body after Siena tells him that everything has ended. Currently, he is barely able to function due to the side effects of Overload. He is seen in episode 20 when Nina goes to talk to him. Unfortunately, Dinn is now a cripple and brain damaged, making him unable to answer Nina. His DITE is a pair of gloves that can shoot out projectiles with his kei.

=== Dalsiena Che Matelna ===
Voiced by: Yui Kano (Japanese); Clarine Harp (English)
Also called Siena by Sharnid and Dinn and a member of the 10th Platoon. She was recently recruited by Sharnid to join the 17th Platoon after Layfon is injured and unable to participate in the inter-platoon against the 1st Platoon. She is apparently a full-time member of the 17th Platoon as she is seen practicing with the rest of the platoon despite Layfon's return to active duty. Dalsiena is very prideful, shamed by losing so easily to the 1st Platoon. She also has a fanclub in Zuellni. Her DITE is a jousting lance and if necessary can transform into a white broadsword. She went with them searching for Nina stating she was part of 17th platoon.
According to Sharnid, she apparently was the only one who seriously took the vow with the captain. Though both she and Dinn take protecting the city seriously, they are hiding some of their true feelings and intentions as well. Their plans to protect Zullini including defeating Vanze and the 1st Platoon to gain leading position in the inter-platoon matches. Dalsiena stated that she once loved Dinn.

== 5th Platoon ==
=== Gorneo Lueckens ===
Voiced by: Hajime Iijima (Japanese); J. Michael Tatum (English)
The captain of the 5th Platoon and Zuellni's supposed strongest military artist. He is also the younger brother of Heaven's Blade wielder Savaris. Supposedly the Luecken's family is considered to be a high family in Glendan, for Gorneo knows some information about the Haikizoku and is targeted by Haia for it. Gorneo's DITE has yet to be revealed, but it is assumed to be a pair of gauntlets like Savaris's. He and his brother also share similar fighting techniques. While the two are brothers, Savaris does not seem to care much for Gorneo, as he is only a person of mediocre skill.
Gahard Barehn was Gorneo's senior. After Gahard was put into an unrecoverable state by Layfon, Gorneo became mortified and stopped smiling. Additionally, Gorneo strongly resented Layfon, and while he wished for Layfon to atone for his actions, he could not help but want to kill him as well. After learning of Gahard's death from Savaris, Gorneo breaks down crying. Though Gorneo still considers Layfon to be his enemy, he recognized that Layfon was the only one capable of saving Zuellni from the Dying Slave and thus agreed to take Leerin to give Layfon the Saiharden DITE.
Gorneo is almost always seen with Shante at his side. He seems to deeply care about her, telling Layfon that it was okay to kill him as long as Shante remained untouched. Unfortunately, Shante often causes him problems by trying too hard to help. When Glendan approaches Zuellni, Gorneo declares that he will side with Zuellni because that is the place where Shante is. Consequently, Shante energetically hugged Gorneo, nearly causing him, Shante, and Leerin to get into an accident. Later on, it is shown that he has become friends with Layfon, or at least accepted him, as he requested Layfon to train Shante through a "friendly" match. Afterwards, Gorneo shook hands and acted friendly towards Layfon.

=== Shante Laite ===
Voiced by: Ami Koshimizu (Japanese); Trina Nishimura (English)
A member of Zuellni's 5th Platoon. Despite her short height, childish appearance and personality, she is in her fifth year of studies, meaning she is twenty years old. She is extremely loyal and protective of Gorneo and is almost always seen at his side. Shante's instincts are very sharp, being able to sense Savaris when Gorneo did not. Her movements and fighting style resemble that of an animal's and prefer reacting on instincts; in the anime, she even wears a tail and head decoration that look like cat ears. Shante is very simple-minded, and although she means well, her actions to help Gorneo often cause him more difficulties. Her past is revealed in the third novel, having grown up with animals due to being abandoned in Erupa, an extremely large forest as a young child. Eventually, she was found by a Wild Animal Investigation Unit, and ended up at Zuellni, where Gorneo has been looking after her for the last five years. Because of this, her mentality and way of thinking is very different from normal people.
Since Layfon took away Gorneo's smile, she dislikes him to the point of attempting to kill him for Gorneo's revenge, resulting in nearly the death of all Layfon, Gorneo and herself. She also has some sort of childish rivalry with Felli, whom she also dislikes, where the two battle over which one is favored more by their respective favorite people (Gorneo and Layfon). As per Gorneo's request, she is currently training with Layfon. Gorneo stated that her kei powers are greater than his own which Layfon proven true, but state that she has little control over it. Shante's DITE is a red spear and uses the element of fire. After hearing Gorneo's decision to side with Zuellni because of her, she became extremely elated, nearly causing a motorcycle accident in the process.

== City Police ==
=== Garen Formed ===
Voiced by: Makoto Yasumura (Japanese); Mike McFarland (English)
The head of police in Zuellni. He got Naruki to recruit Layfon after the found out the two knew each other. He seems to be interested in money more than he should be, but his intentions to use the money to benefit Zuellni are genuine.

In the novel, he seems to have keen eyes. He told Naruki to observe Layfon and said he walks in a path different from his age. Note: He is not a Military Artist.

=== Naruki Gelni ===
Voiced by: Fuyuka Oura (Japanese); Jamie Marchi (English)
A first year student of the Military Arts Department, she is a tall girl who is a friend of Mayshen and Mifi. She became friends with Layfon after he saved Mayshen at the inauguration incident. Layfon thinks the Military art uniform suited her. She has a strong sense of justice and works for the police department of Zuellni. Her favorite technique is the arresting technique, which she practices on a daily basis. Her dream is to become a police officer. The first time she trained with 17th Platoon, she was surprised by the fact that it was Layfon against all the team (one to four) but, to her astonishment, he quickly defeats them with ease. She stated that there was sadness in Layfon, which caused her and her friends to give up on researching Layfon's history; nonetheless, they continued to wonder about what kind of past he had.

In the novel, she is the only one who sparred with Layfon when nobody wanted in Military Arts class, she teased him about touching her breast in their fight. She at first refused to become a 17th Platoon member since she was in the City Police but later accepted the offer under the instruction of Form.

== Salinban Mercenary Training Group ==
=== Haia Salinban Lyia ===
Voiced by: Takuma Terashima (Japanese); Joel McDonald (English)
The third generation head of the Salinban Mercenary Training Group. Like Layfon, he uses the Saiharden techniques and is irritated by the fact that Layfon does not use a katana. He also has a tattoo over his left eye. According to Fermaus, he was interested in Layfon for a long time, and he both wanted to fight against him and alongside him for at least one time in his life. In his two encounters with Layfon, he was overpowered the first time and clearly lost the second time. The first time, Myunfa came to bail him out, and the second time, he managed to scratch Layfon but lost his katana and suffered a wound. When he encounters the Pollutant Beasts later on, he regains his katana. He enjoys taunting Layfon for being a "former Heaven's Blade wielder." Haia is shown to be very skilled, taking down his share of Pollutant Beasts while the rest of the gang merely distracted the beasts. He later kidnaps Felli in episode 20 in order to have a final duel with Layfon in order to prove he's better than him.
According to Kanaris, the Salinban Mercenary Training Group was sent to retrieve the Haikizoku. It seems that Kalian asked the Salinban Mercenary Training Group to help out with the Pollutant Beast mess that Zuellni is currently in to lessen the stress on Layfon. Fermaus noted that even though Layfon is exhausted, reality points to the fact that Haia is still unable to beat him. During his third battle with Layfon it is shown his element was fire. He is ultimately defeated by Layfon during their third fight in episode 21.

In the novels, according to Layfon, Haia's skill is at the level of a Heaven's Blade wielder his kei however is not strong enough to match up.

=== Myunfa Rufa ===
Voiced by: Saki Fujita (Japanese); Alexis Tipton (English)
The archer in the Salinban Mercenary Training Group. She is very shy, blushing when Haia tells her to stalk a person she likes to improve her abilities. She infiltrated Zuellni with Haia and rescued him when Layfon knocked Haia into a store during their first encounter.

=== Fellmouse ===
Voiced by: Jason Douglas (English)
The genius psychokinesis user who is also approved by Queen Alsheyra. In addition to his normal abilities, he can sense Pollutant Beasts as long as he goes outside without any other equipment. As a result, his body is rotting away, he is forced to wear a mask, and he is only able to communicate with psychokinesis or with an electronic voice. He states that humans may find a way to overcome the pollutant if they studied his body. Fellmouse wanted to meet Layfon for a while but gave up on the idea because he was not planning on returning to Glendan. Fellmouse's real name is Elsmau and is the Heaven's Blade Receiver Dellbone's grandson. Fellmouse notes that Haia is unable to defeat Layfon even if Layfon is exhausted or injured. His psychokinesis pins are blue.

== Citizens of Glendan ==
=== Leerin Marfes ===
Voiced by: Mikako Takahashi (Japanese); Colleen Clinkenbeard (English)
Layfon's childhood friend, who currently resides in Glendan. Both she and Layfon grew up together at the same orphanage. She supported Layfon even after his gambling incident was found out and distanced herself from the orphanage as a result. She is friends with Synola Leisler, who gropes her breasts every time they meet. Recently, she was given a box with what appears to be a DITE, which represents the fact that all the Saiharden techniques have been passed down, in it by her foster father from the orphanage. As per her father's request, Leerin travelled with Savaris, who is secretly guarding her, to Zuellni to give the item to Layfon. She also met Nina after Nina was transported by Zuellni once Haikizoku possessed Nina and gets along with her. She is said to have the origin of all Electronic Fairies within her. She admitted never having try to understand Layfon's burden, that if someone had to be angry after him for what he had done, he must be angry at them (the orphans), because he did it for them. She was revealed to be the queen's fiancé's daughter, he had fled and had her somewhere else. Her right eye seems to be a link with Saya as she appeared in it. Her eye is called Vine Eye and is said to be Ailen's eye, someone Saya wants to be reunited with and so care for Leerin. Both her and Layfon wish to be reunited again on the soils of Glendan.

=== Queen Alsheyra ===
Voiced by: Akeno Watanabe (Japanese); Lydia Mackay (English)
The Queen of the Proto-City Spear Shelled Glendan, her full name is Alsheyra Almonise. Despite being a queen, she is also one of the 12 Heaven's Blade successors. She is vastly stronger than any of the individual Heaven's Blade Receivers, and only if they all were to band together, would their power surpass hers. It is implied that her strength may be the result of possessing a Haikizoku. Bored of her life as Queen Alsheyra, she left the castle to live a different kind life under the disguise of a senior laboratory student, Synola Leiser. The Heaven's Blade Receiver Kanaris Earifon Rivin was forced to cover for her, due to the latter's ability to impersonate others. She met Leerin in a meadow one day, and they have been friends since. She has a habit of rating other people's breasts, particularly fond of those from Leerin.
Although very laid-back and compassionate as Synola Leiser, Queen Alsheyra is shown to be extremely strict with the Heaven's Blade wielders. She doesn't hesitate to kill them if necessary, and her word is absolute to them. However, she also seems to be quite interested in their lives, as she knew that Layfon wasn't careful with his studies and was thus surprised he had been accepted in Zuellni's scholarship. She also stated that Layfon's exile was due to immaturity and his lack of world's perception and bears no grudge against him. Regardless, she is still protective of Leerin. In response to Leerin's question, Alsheyra has said that it is not impossible for Layfon to return, but whether he wants to or not is not an issue for her to deal with, especially since he is a Saiharden. She revealed Leerin could have been her daughter but, her fiancé fled and had her elsewhere. She wanted Leerin to have a normal life but remarked about how she had chosen her way, like Layfon had. In the novel, It's revealed that there are three branches to Glendan's royal family and that they intermarry each three generations, she was born to the Ronsmier and Almonise families and she was to marry a Euthenol man. It is revealed her next suitor (husband) may be chosen among the Heaven's Blade wielders. She states her life is meaningless without twelve Heaven's Blade and hinted Layfon and all people related had been forgiven by the Royal family so only left the public. Lintens calls her "Your Crappiness".

=== Derk Saiharden ===
Voiced by: Tohru Furusawa (Japanese); Mark Stoddard (English)
Layfon and Leerin's foster father from the orphanage in Glendan. He taught Layfon the Saiharden techniques throughout Layfon's childhood. He and Leerin left the orphanage after taking Layfon's side during the gambling incident in Glendan. Derk gave Leerin a box which contains a DITE to recognize Layfon for learning all of the Saiharden techniques. He and Haia's master were brother apprentices. Leerin revealed that he had forgiven Layfon a long time ago. In the novel, he stated Layfon needed forgiveness especially toward himself because he was sober and dull. He also revealed he had a katana ready for Layfon but he finished to teach him the Saiharden skills when he was very young and he lost his chance to give it to him afterward since he used a sword. He knew Layfon refused to inherit of them because he felt guilty about his wrongdoing and betraying.

=== Gahard Barehn ===
Voiced by: Tetsu Inada (Japanese); Jeremy Inman (English)
A Glendan military artist who dreamed to become a Heaven's Blade wielder. He was Gorneo's senior which the later admired him due to his constant years of training to become a member of the Heaven's Blade. During a tournament held to select the newest Heaven's Blade wielder, Gahard's dreams were crushed with him humiliated after losing to a 10-year-old Layfon who became the winner of the tournament. Since that incident, he held a grudge against Layfon. A few years after this, Gahard got evidence of Layfon's participation in illegal underground matches. He blackmailed Layfon with this evidence to get Layfon to have an official match with him and have him purposely lose, so he would gain the Heaven's Blade, along with the title; however, Layfon instead tried to kill him, but only managing to dismember him. Though Gahard lost, he still managed to expose the scandal. Not long after Layfon's exile, Gahard was possessed by a Pollutant Beast. Although those who are possessed by a Pollutant Beast are no longer mentally conscious, Gahard retained his consciousness somewhat, but he became insane; he killed the referee from his match with Layfon, and targeted both Leerin and her father, believing they were responsible for the loss of his "title". He ran away from Leerin and her father after Glendan appeared, only to be met by Savaris and Lintens's golden wires. Gahard was tied down by Lintens and ultimately taken down by Savaris as punishment for trying to kill Leerin and her father and revenge for destroying Layfon's reputation.

== The Heaven's Blades ==
The Heaven's Blades are twelve DITEs given to the strongest twelve Military Artists in Glendan, who possess great fighting skills and large amount of kei, by the Glendan Royal Family. Upon gaining a Heaven's Blade, Glendan's DITE Technicians format the Heaven's Blade DITE to the receiver's specifications. The Heaven's Blade Receivers are apthetic toward anything else other than fighting or strength; they usually fight alone or with other Heaven's Blade only. They showed little interest in the fact that Layfon has betrayed the trust of ophans, Savaris claimed that he should have finish the job by killing Gahard.
In the anime, all of Heaven's Blades have been revealed. Queen Alsheyra's Staff, Savaris' Gauntlets, Lintens's Gauntlets, Kanaris' rapier, Bermelin's gun, Cauntia's Guan Dao (Pole bladed halberd), Troiatte's cane, Delbone's psychokinesis staff, Ruimei's Ball and chain, Tigris' Bow and Arrow, Reverse's shield, and Layfon's Sword and Katana. Those who have a Heaven's Blade are referred to as Heaven's Blade wielders and receive a middle name as a title. Layfon "Wolfstein" Alseif. NOTE: it would appear that the Queen of Glendan does not have a middle name Title, or it is never mentioned.

=== Queen Alsheyra ===
Confirmed as the strongest of the Heaven's Blades in the Light Novel only. Her Heaven's Blade is a staff. Her power is a result of the three royal families of Glendan merging and condensing generations after generations and fusing the blood of Heaven's Blades Wielders. She defeats Lintens without her DITE when he first came to Glendan.

=== Savaris Qaulafin Lueckens ===
Voiced by: Junichi Suwabe (Japanese); Robert McCollum (English)
Heaven's Blade Format: Gauntlets
Became a Heaven's Blade Receiver at the age of 13, his weapon of choice is a pair of gauntlets. He has long, silvery hair. Described as a "battle maniac" by Layfon, Savaris' only desire in life is to become ever stronger, and he holds little interest for anything else. He has a younger brother named Gorneo, who is the leader of the 5th Platoon on Zuellni.
In the anime, Savaris was assigned to protect Leerin while letting her run free, a task he finds troublesome, by Queen Alsheyra. He appears to have some ulterior motives concerning Haikizoku in general, most likely due to his desire to experience a greater power, though he didn't hide it from the queen. He later steals the Haikizoku power from Nina and in a fit of rage attacks Layfon, nearly killing him until his Heaven's Blade is returned to him and defeats Savaris in one strike. Lintens reveals that Savaris had left but stated about how he will return soon.
In the novels, Savaris is depicted as slightly less sinister than his anime self. After escorting Leerin safely to Zuellni, he approved of his brother Gorneo as the inheritor of the Lueckens school of Military Arts and helped him train during his stay. Later, he appeared to help Layfon in a battle against a matured phase filth monster. However, after that battle he fought Layfon because he was after the Haikizoku (which was in Nina). In the end, he sustained a fatal blow to the throat and would have died if Lintens didn't sew him up.
Gorneo states that Savaris is the only one capable of mastering Thousand Man Rush and Roaring Kei (though Layfon can imitate it to a degree). Savaris also mastered his own technique, which he used as a last resort in the battle against the filth monster with Layfon.
The battle in episode 1 was also different in the novel in that Layfon and Savaris were the last two to attack with Listence first (in reverse from the anime). Savaris initiated his final attack, but he already used all his kei within 10 seconds. Due to a natural recovery time, he was trying to recover as fast as possible to finish off the escaping filth monster. When he did and caught up, Layfon was ahead of him by a second. Here, Savaris notes Layfon's superior kei recovery speed. He wondered if this split second difference was all that was needed to determine a victor between the two of them.

=== Lintens Savoled Harden ===
Voiced by: Daisuke Kirii (Japanese); Vic Mignogna (English)
Heaven's Blade Format: Gauntlets
Currently the strongest Heaven's Blade Receiver, Lintens utilizes a pair of gauntlets that enable him to control countless golden threads of Kei. In the novel, it is revealed he came from another city; he was bored in his home city, the filth monsters were rare and too weak for him to enjoy a battlefield, and left when he was twenty, wandered for five years before stepping on Glendan, where he met the Queen that promised him he would meet a battlefield where he would be relieved not to be in, whom he has yet to. Since Alsheyra became queen he was the oldest to be bestowed a Heaven's Blade. He lives in the quarter of the city for the wielders however he has an old apartment he does not clean as the Queen used to send maids, but since they all asked to go somewhere else she decided to come with a vacuum cleaner, which greatly annoys Lintens. Lintens taught Layfon to test him, because he was curious of his capacity to learn. Beside he named a filth monster that had evaded the Reverse/Cauntia combination, though Troiatte commented he had no interest in an enemy that had fled. In spite of being very serious and anti-social to the point of hostility, Lintens acknowledged Layfon as his only apprentice and taught him how to use his steel threads technique. He stated that at best, Layfon's ability with the steel threads was one thousandth of Lintens's own, but it is also said that he "likes to exaggerate". It seems he was impressed by Layfon's ability to learn kei-related techniques simply through observing them.

=== Kanaris Earifon Rivin ===
Voiced by: Akeno Watanabe (Japanese); Stephanie Young (English)
Heaven's Blade Format: Rapier
The Heaven's Blade wielder with dark, long hair, purple eyes, and a veil over her face. She is most often seen with Queen Alsheyra. Whenever Queen Alsheyra leaves the palace, Kanaris is left to act for her by transforming into her appearance. However she complains the other Heaven's Blade wielders don't want to listen to her. She continuously begs for Alsheyra to come back but to no avail. She has a very careful and serious nature. While Alsheyra does appreciate this fact, it also can anger her. For example, Kanaris researched the connection between Leerin and Alsheyra and was nearly strangled to death by Alsheyra for doing so. Still, she does seem to know the connection between the two. Her Heaven's Blade is a rapier. In the novel, she is often disguised as the Queen, but asked her to come back because although the City could be managed with Kanaris and the parliament, Kanaris lacks the authority to command the other Heaven's Blade successors. She is also a member of the royal family.

=== Barmeleen Swattis Norne ===
Voiced by: Mariya Ise (Japanese); Lindsey Seidel (English)
Heaven's Blade Format: Gun
The Gothic member of the Heaven's Blades. Her Heaven's Blade is a gun that can also transform into a cannon-like weapon. She uses bad language and is ill-tempered. She was seen fighting off the Wolfmask Mob with Dickserio, though she thought he was the intruder at first and didn't really fight with him, not even answering his question about her Heaven's Blade. And she was also present in the battle with a large Filth Monster and of Layfon's return as a Heaven's Blade wielder. She complained about how her appearance was late. In the novel, it is stated she talks like an old woman to people.

=== Kauntia Valmon Farnes ===
Voiced by: Ayumi Fujimura (Japanese); Kara Edwards (English)
Heaven's Blade Format: Guan Dao
The long, pale-haired Heaven's Blade wielder. Her weapon of choice is shown to be something of a pole-bladed halberd similar to a Guan Dao in the opening of the show. In the first episode, she reprimands another Heaven's Blade wielder for giving Layfon weak advice. She states that the only thing you need to do with Pollutant Beasts is dash in and slash them, apparently finding a battle with them easy. Queen Alsheyra responds with even higher standards for Layfon. She didn't want Layfon to be the only one to show off in the filth monster battle.
In the novel, she is the companion of the Heaven's Blade Receiver Reverse. It is said that in battle, she focuses solely on attacking, completely disregarding all defense. Her halberd boasts ultimate attacking power, and paired with Reverse's ultimate defence, they form a formidable duo. She is not from Glendan.

=== Troyat Gavanest Filandeen ===
Voiced by: Takashi Kondo (Japanese); Josh Grelle (English)
Heaven's Blade Format: Cane
He is the purple haired man that was sent with Lintens, Cauntia and Reverse to fight the dying slave.
In the novels, Troiatte is able to change the density of the atmosphere to focus sunlight and literally burn down his opponents. He is flirty and only thinking of women while quite keen on what happens in the castle.

=== Delbone Quantis Myuura ===
Voiced by: Toshiko Sawada
Heaven's Blade Format: Psychokinesis Staff
She is an old woman with a veil on a rolling chair. She is very old, over one hundred years and stays in hospital. She is the only psychokinesis user among the Heaven's Blade Receivers, making information gathering and combat support her primary task. Though psychokinesis is a support-oriented ability, for her to achieve a position among the warriors of ultimate fighting power speaks volumes of the level of her talent in it. For example, she can detect any filth monster no less than a week before they are able to reach Glendan. She dies in the 14th Novel in the fight against the filth monster after suffering a mental attack, passing on her Heaven's Blade and title to Felmouse, or Elsmau, her granddaughter. In the novel, her flakes formed a five-petaled flower as she spoke to Felli.

=== Ruimei Garrand MacRing ===
Heaven's Blade Format: Ball and Chain
Wearing a samurai-like armor, he fought against the Wolfmask Mob in the maze.
In the novels, Ruimei is described as possessing extremely destructive attacks. When he fights without restraint, it is possible to destroy an entire city alone. His second wife, Lucia, was once a resident of the orphanage Layfon grew up in and is the Mother of his only child.

=== Tigris Noieran Ronsmaia ===
Heaven's Blade Format: Bow and Arrow
He looks like a monk, shaved with a long white beard and he is seen fighting against the Wolfmask Mob to protect the secret room under Glendan's palace. He dies during the fight in the 14th Novel after his Kei Vein suffers too much damage, and after he pushes Barmelin out of the way of the filth monster's attack, being buried under stone there after.

=== Kalvan Geordius Midontto ===
Voiced by: Youji Ueda
Heaven's Blade Format: Long Sword

=== Reverse Irjinas Elmen ===
Voiced by: Gô Shinomiya (Japanese); Ian Sinclair (English)
Heaven's Blade Format: Shield
He is the one in armor that was at first advising Layfon not to be nervous on his first battle as a Heaven's Blade Wielder. Cauntia stated he has always spirited word, comparing the dying slave to an onion. In the novel, his face is seen, round. He is Cauntia's companion and they fight together as a team, complementing each other through their abilities. He has mastered a skill called "Kongoukei", which can block any enemy attack and cause them to be rebound. This skill is the reason Reverse was able to become a Heaven's Blade Receiver. Said to have the ultimate defense out of all Heaven's Blades. He is not from Glendan.

=== Layfon Wolfstein Alseif ===
Voiced by: Nobuhiko Okamoto (Japanese); Todd Haberkorn (English)
Heaven's Blade Format: Sword
As stated in his main article above, Layfon was previously a Heaven's Blade wielder until he was exiled from Glendan. His Heaven's Blade was in the form of a long Sword, with gold design on it, made with a white DITE that he received when he was 10, being the youngest Heaven's Blade successor. As a child, Layfon was particularly adapt at understanding and using Kei skills of all kinds by observation, including special techniques gleaned from almost all of Glendan's different dojos.
Later on, a warrior named Gahard challenged Layfon for his Heaven's Blade title, but tried to blackmail him into giving up his Heaven's Blade with proof of Layfon's participation in underground matches as the blackmail material. In retaliation, during the match, Layfon attacked and cut off Gahard's arm as recompense, though he was aiming for a lethal attack. Seeing this Queen Alsheira ordered the capture and, later, the exile of Layfon.
In the anime when confronted by Savaris, who was possessed by the Haikizoku, the Heaven's Blade came back to Layfon when Savaris was about to kill him and eventually merged with his Saiharden katana, becoming a mix of katana and sword, and big enough to let Layfon fly on it like a board. Later on, the sword was returned to Glendan, but it is unknown if it remained a sword or a katana. While it is acknowledged by the Queen that Layfon was exiled to keep the city calm, it is unknown if he still actually remains one within Glendan.
In the novel, Savaris and Layfon worked together against a mature filth without the Heaven's Blades and failed to kill it. After they were indirectly saved by the Queen, Layfon and Savaris started to fight each other because Savaris was after the Haizokou. Under weakened conditions where only the simple Admanitite was still functional and Savaris could only use one of his hands, Layfon won and nearly killed Savaris.
The queen assessed Layfon at the end of Volume 12 by stating that his before his exile, his skills and manipulation of kei has always been a notch below the other Heaven's Blade Receivers (probably due to inexperience), but his inherent sheer quantity of kei, his recovery of kei (something Savaris confirmed), and his endurance with kei were considered amongst the best, even among the Heaven's Blades receivers. However in the end of the story the queen says that her life is meaningless without twelve Heaven's Blade and hinted Layfon and all people related had been forgiven by the Royal family and so Layfon returns one of The Heaven's Blades.

== Other characters ==
=== Zuellni ===
Voiced by: Tia Ballard (English)
The Electronic Spirit of the Academy City Zuellni. She takes the form of a small, young, light blue skinned girl. She is friends with Nina Antalk as they both share a sister-like relationship, and she takes a liking to Layfon, which is rare since she is known to shock most humans she meets. She was sealed in Nina's body with the Haikizoku but in the final she is seen flying between Nina and Layfon with his pink bento on their work place.

=== Glendan ===
The Electronic Spirit of Proto-City Spear Shelled Glendan. It takes a form of giant lion with a long bushy tail and small wing on its ears. Unlike most Electronic Spirits which tend to avoid Filth Monsters as much as possible, Glendan does the opposite and find them. Due to its actions, the city of Glendan is always constantly in battle with the Filth monsters which had led the city to produce the most skilled Military artists and fighters than any other city but with most of the city's expense spent on repairing the city from every battle. It was seen protecting Leerin when Gahard attacked her.

=== Gandoweria ===
Voiced by: Kinryuu Arimoto (Japanese); R Bruce Elliott (English)
The Electronic Spirit of the deserted Academy City Gandoweria regios that beat Zuellni in an intercity battle two years ago and was attacked by Pollutant Beasts afterwards. It takes the form of a goat and possesses those with a strong will. It is currently causing Zuellni to go berserk, continuously encountering Pollutant Beasts, to try to bring ruin to the city. It was turned to Haikizoku and considered as "The Fallen One". It tried to possess Layfon, possessed Dinn before being removed, and then possessed Nina. However in episode 24, it left Nina and possessed Savaris who was able to use its power to a great point until Layfon used his Heaven's Blade to knock it into the Aurora. Its current status is unknown/debatable. In the novel, when Layfon met it, he was shocked when he realize he was stunned and resisted on instinct and because he knew that if he was unable to move, the others would have no chance to withshand it. When he succeeded into free himself it was impressed. His real name is Melnisc.

=== Myath ===
The Electronic Spirit of Academy City Myath that takes the form of a red bird. It instructed Leerin on how to help Nina when the Haikizoku was giving Nina problems.

=== Dixerio Maskane ===
Voiced by: Hiro Yuuki (Japanese); Chris Cason (English)
A red-haired military artist who appears in the anime in episode 3 and 19. He plays a crucial in the novel, he studied in Zuellni ten years ago. He is the sworn enemy of the Masked Wolf troops, as seen by his action of stopping them from taking Zuellni. He erased Nina's memories of their fight and disappeared since. He uses a broad iron whip, he later taught his signature technique called the "Thunder Flash".
He is also the protagonist of the spin-off light novel, The Regios Crusade. He reappears in Myath to save Nina once again and to ask her to protect Leerin. He seems to know the origin of everything about the world they live in. While invading Glendan, he revealed that the Masked Wolf troops killed his father, brother, people he trusted, and even people Dixerio himself wanted to kill along with destroying his city. In the last episode, he said it was only a beginning and farewell to Nina.

=== Wolfmask Mob ===
A group of anarchists dressed in hooded robes with a wolf mask on. They originate for a place called the Zero Realm in the anime. There are also people in the Regios Realm who follow, or are in the Wolfmask mob. One example would be the chief of Myath's police in the anime. The Wolfmask Mob wishes to see their idol Ignacius dominate the Regios Realm and will sacrifice their lives in order to see this vision through.

=== Ignacius ===
The apparent deity, or leader of the Wolfmask Mob. It is implied by Dickserio that he resides or is the ruler of the Zero Realm: an apparent Haven for Extremely powerful Pollutant Beasts. Ignacius is referred to in the third person at all times by the Wolfmask Mob members. They also appear to refer to the Regios' in the third person as well. Ignacius apparently wishes to take over the realm of Regios and does so by killing off cities by stealing their electronic fairies. Ignacius may be the creator of the Pollutant Beasts for if his "age" is to come, and his emissary was a giant Pollutant Beast, then it would imply that Ignacius has something to do with the creation of the Pollutant Beasts, or is somehow related.

=== Dainsleif ===
The Extremely powerful Pollutant beast that comes through the aurora near to the end of the Anime. It would appear that it is able to regenerate its own heart and must be eliminated much to the effect of Limbeekun in the first episode. Dainsleif is referred to as Ignacius' emissary from the Zero Realm by Dickserio. This would imply that Ignacius is a Pollutant beast, is the creator of the pollutant beasts (if the age of the Regios is over, meaning they are all destroyed, that would mean the pollutant beasts are free to do as they please), or is in some way related to them. Dainsleif was sent by Ignacius to the realm of Regios to destroy it.

== Legend of Regios ==
The Legend of Regios side story takes place in the same world, but during a time of the past.

=== Saya ===
Voiced by: Kaori Nazuka (Japanese); Tia Ballard (English)
A girl with black, long hair who has been seen in the reflection of Leerin's eyes. She is a genetic human and is able to pull out guns from what appears to be her body. Saya works with Ailen as something of a mercenary for hire. It is revealed at the end of episode 24 that she is indeed still alive, apparently ageless and immortal. Apparently she is also responsible for the Heaven's Blades and decides who will wield it. She chose to send the Heaven's Blade of Sky back to Layfon and might be responsible for its fusion with Layfon's Saiharden katana. She seems to have awakened and is no longer in the sealed room. At the end, she is seen taking the goat mask in her hand. She is searching to be reunited with Ailain and she knows that Leerin's right eye is Ailain's, and thus is fond of her.

=== Airen Garfield ===
Voiced by: Hiroki Yasumoto (Japanese); Christopher Bevins (English)
He is Saya's partner and is a travelling detective with dark hair. He has a black patch over his right eye. Leerin's right eye is said to be Airen's eye.

=== Ramis ===
Voiced by: Kaoru Shimamura (Japanese); Anastasia Muñoz (English)
A short, blond woman who is being protected by Saya and her partner, Ailen. She is being hunted down by inhuman beings and others, and apparently is precious to Gedosh.

=== Zidd ===
Voiced by: Sousuke Komori (Japanese); Phil Parsons (English)
One of the masks who is trying to attack Ramis.

== Terminology ==
Regios
Large mobile cities created by unknown forces sheltering the human population from pollutants. Each city is named after the Electronic Spirit that controls the Regios. Most Regios avoid Filth Monsters as much as possible but with the exception of Glendan, which does the opposite as it constantly finds monsters. There are two different kinds of cities: academic and general. Academic cities such as Myath, Zuellni, and the former Gandoweria are places where students from different areas come to learn and study. General cities are the main cities where most of the population lives. Different types of cities are under the title of general city. These include Trade cities, transport cities and the Proto-City Glendan. Due to a human-made treaty, only Regios of the same type are allowed to have a "war" with each other; although it is unclear if the Electronic Spirits consider the treaty to be binding on them. The "war" is basically a non-lethal capture the flag game with the prize being mineral rights. These minerals are the sole source of power for the Regios thus if a Regios loses too many wars it will lose the ability to function and die.
- Proto-City Spear-Shelled Glendan: The most powerful city in the world due to its regular encounters with Filth Monsters of all levels and was the birthplace of the Military Arts, which most other cities practice today. The Twelve Heaven's Blades are found here under the command of the Glendan Royal Family.
- Academic City Zuellni: A University City governed by its students. This is where the manga/light novel/anime takes place. Its Electronic Spirit takes the shape of a pale blue girl.
- Academic City Gandoweria: A former city that was overrun by Contaminoids not long after their victory over Zuellni two years ago. Its electronic spirit takes the form of a goat-like creature and is currently running amok as a Haikizoku.
- Sheniebel: The city Nina Antalk grew up in, currently the only city with the Spirit Copy System which is capable of making new Electronic Fairies. Like Glendan, Sheniebel also has a royal family, which Nina is the heiress of, as seen in the manga of Chrome Shelled Regios.
- Academic City Myath: An academic city like Zuellni, its electronic spirit takes the form of a red bird. In the anime, the military capabilities of this city are shown to be poor, perhaps even worse than that of Zuellni, as there was no evidence of resistance from the city's residents when attacked by a mature Contaminoid.
- Transport City Yoltem: The original home city of Mayshen Torinden, Mifi Rotten and Naruki Gerlni, according to the manga. All roaming buses eventually return to Yoltem and most travelers will encounter it during their travels. Only its electronic spirit knows the current location of every Regios.
- Trade City Santoburug: The city Kalian Loss and his sister Felli grew up in. Their family holds significant positions and weight in the city, and is the Regios.
Electronic Spirit
Special artificial creatures that control the Regios. Created by scientists as a two-way solution of having an AI performing the many functions of a Regios while having a mind of a human for maintaining and controlling the Regios, they are the most important asset of every city. Without them, the city would die. On the other hand, the electronic spirit will also die if it does not have Selenium, a special ore that induces the Regios to fight each other for their city's survival. An electronic spirit whose city has been destroyed by filth monsters turns into a Haikizoku, a being which is capable of greatly enhancing a Kei user's power, but the user will be filled with endless hatred towards filth monsters. Obtaining the power of the Haikizoku for use in the final battle for survival of the world is one of the major plots of the story.
Filth Monsters/Pollutant Beasts/Contaminoids
Monsters roaming the polluted earth outside the Regios. In the novels, Layfon and Kalian encountered an enormous and extremely powerful one that speaks the human language, according to it, pollutant beasts are also a creation of humans. Their main food sources are the pollutants they filter from the air as they breathe the atmosphere. This appears to have been their original purpose, to rid the land of the pollutants. If the pollutants can't be obtained, they eat humans and each other. They have many forms and sizes.
- Larva: The first state of the Filth Monsters. Ravenous feeders, they will eat any living thing they find. They are overwhelming in number, although easily dispatched by skilled Kei users and expert Military Artists. They prove to be difficult for the students of Zullini when they first encountered in the novel. It would appear that there are two different types of Larva stage Pollutant Beasts. Some of the Larva stage forms are able to fly, while others seem to only be able to move along the ground. In the anime, it appears as if the larva can shift between the two when Zuellni is attacked from below by Larva stage Pollutant beasts. Some sprout wings and attack the academic city from the air. It is unconfirmed whether or not these mature into different types of queen stage Pollutant Beasts.
- Queen: A Filth Monster that lays eggs that hatch into Larva. This is the second form of Filth Monsters. Based upon the anime, (With the exception of Limbeekun) these Pollutant Beasts live, and lay their eggs underground. It would also appear that when they mature enough, they travel above ground and latch themselves onto a nearby rock or pillar. They then molt inside of their current skin into a mature form, and may wait until a meal passes by.
- Mature: A Filth Monster who has, generally, moved past its ability to procreate (although the transformation types seem to be the exception to this rule since they seem to have found an abnormal way to reproduce), the longer they live the more powerful they become. In their Mature state, Filth Monsters are able to fly. This is the third form of Filth Monsters. In Glendan there exists a tradition that if a Mature Level Filth Monster is engaged by the Heaven's Blade Receivers and manages to escape alive, then it is given a name. In the anime, one such example is Limbeekun, though it was defeated by Lintence, Savaris and Layfon when it attacked Santoburug at the beginning of the first episode, it has a counterpart in the Light Novel called Behemoth.
Note: In the anime, Dainsleif is a powerful Pollutant beast from the Zero realm. It does not appear to be similar to the Pollutant Beasts in the world of Regios because its body is much different. This may be due to an extreme maturity phase or because of Ignacius' design.
DITE
DITEs are the weapons used by Kei users. DITEs are small rectangular devices. When used, these DITEs transfer into the user's weapon of choice. The user activates it by saying "Restoration". DITEs have the ability to transform into the following weapons: crushing swords, spears, rifles, staves, katanas, and many more. Some DITEs are capable to switch to many different types of weapons. The color of the DITE ore is not random; different colors give different properties to the weapon. For example, Nina's iron whips uses black DITE ore, which has good density with a decreasing conductive rate. Green and white DITE ore is used for speed-based weapons, which was suggested for Layfon to use. People who work on the development of DITEs are called DITE Technicians in Glendan and DITE Mechanics in Zuellni.
- The Heaven's Blade: The most powerful DITEs wielded by the "Heaven's Blade Receivers" Whom serve under the Royal Family of Glendan. There are twelve in existence at the maximum since there are only twelve DITEs. They do not have a fixed format, volume or weight as weapons, upon appointment of a new wielder they can be reformatted by Glendan's DITE Technicians to take on the shape and abilities of the weapon the receiver desires. Another instance was when Layfon's Psyharden Katana and Heaven's Blade (sword format) merged to take on a Katana format in the anime. In the novels, the DITEs themselves are passed down from generation to generation, they can withstand the monstrous quantity of kei that a Heaven's Blade receiver produces without breaking like a normal DITE would. Layfon had problems wielding a normal DITE after using a Heaven's Blade because he has to restrict his flow of kei or else the DITE would explode.

Kei
A source of power for Martial Artists. Kei users are special since they have an organ within their bodies that produces this energy and Kei users can use it in many ways. There are different types of Kei each with its own qualities. In the Anime it is said that the "Heaven's Blade Receivers" have "monstrous" amount of kei that makes even the strongest kei users look weak.
- External Type kei: Used for attack. This kei is used in the form of a blast to affect surrounding materials.
- Internal Type kei: Used for defense and regeneration. This kei is used to strengthen parts of the body during battle or to speed up regeneration. Layfon claims that it is bread and butter for the receivers of the Heaven's Blade to fight continuously for a period of days without getting tired or unfit for battle.
- Psychokinetic kei: Users of this kei (who are also called Nen-I users) are able to communicate telepathically as well as move objects around telekinetically. The downside of this kei is that those who are able to use it cannot use External Type kei or Internal Type kei because their psychokinesis is a fusion of both Internal and External kei. A person must be born with a special physical constitution to use this kei, while the other two can be utilized by anyone with training and a certain level of kei.
