= Chrome Shelled Regios =

Japanese light novel series and its franchise

- Cover of Chrome Shelled Regios volume 1 as published by Fujimi Shobo

鋼殻のレギオス (Kōkaku no Regiosu)
- Light novel
- Written by: Shūsuke Amagi
- Illustrated by: Miyū
- Published by: Fujimi Shobo
- Imprint: Fujimi Fantasia Bunko
- Magazine: Dragon Magazine (short stories only)
- Original run: March 18, 2006 – September 25, 2013
- Volumes: 25
Further information
Manga
Written by	Shūsuke Amagi
Illustrated by	Miyū
Published by	Fujimi Shobo
Magazine	Dragon Age Pure
Original run	November 29, 2006 – September 20, 2011
Volumes	3
Manga
Chrome Shelled Regios: Missing Mail
Written by	Shūsuke Amagiike
Illustrated by	Nodoka Kiyose
Published by	Fujimi Shobo
Magazine	Monthly Dragon Age
Original run	June 8, 2007 – February 9, 2013
Volumes	8
Manga
Chrome Shelled Regios: Secret Side
Written by	Shūsuke Amagi
Illustrated by	Watari
Published by	Kadokawa Shoten
Magazine	Beans Ace
Original run	April 10, 2008 – May 22, 2009
Volumes	2
Light novel
Legend of Regios
Written by	Shūsuke Amagi
Illustrated by	Miyū
Published by	Fujimi Shobo
Imprint	Style-F; Fujimi Fantasia Bunko
Original run	June 29, 2007 – September 20, 2008
Volumes	3
Anime television series
Directed by	Itsuro Kawasaki
Produced by	Tomoko Kawasaki; Tsuneo Takechi; Seiichi Hachiya; Tomoko Suzuki; Yuka Harada; Atsuyuki Okamoto
Written by	Mamiko Ikeda
Music by	Daisuke Asakura
Studio	Zexcs
Licensed by	AUS: Madman Entertainment; NA: Crunchyroll; UK: MVM Films
Original network	SUN-TV, Tokyo MX
English network	SEA: Animax Asia; US: Funimation Channel
Original run	January 11, 2009 – June 20, 2009
Episodes	24
Manga
Chrome Shelled Regios 4-Koma: Felli's Song
Written by	Shūsuke Amagi
Illustrated by	Masumi Futaba
Published by	Kadokawa Shoten
Magazine	Monthly Dragon Age
Published	2009
Volumes	2
Light novel
Regios Crusade
Written by	Shūsuke Amagi
Illustrated by	Miyū
Published by	Fujimi Shobo
Imprint	Style-F; Fujimi Fantasia Bunko
Original run	March 16, 2009 – January 20, 2012
Volumes	3
Light novel
My Journey with Regios
Written by	Hideaki Kawamura
Illustrated by	Hayabusa Konno
Published by	Fujimi Shobo
Imprint	Kadokawa Tsubasa Bunko
Original run	June 15, 2009 – September 15, 2009
Volumes	2
- icon

Chrome Shelled Regios (鋼殻のレギオス, Kōkaku no Regiosu) is a Japanese light novel series by Shūsuke Amagi, with illustrations by Miyū. A short story light novel series was serialized in Dragon Magazine. A manga adaptation drawn by Miyū was serialized in the shōnen manga magazine Dragon Age Pure. A second manga adaptation drawn by Nodoka Kiyose is serialized in the shōnen manga magazine Monthly Dragon Age. A third manga adaptation drawn by Watari was serialized in Beans Ace magazine. A four-panel comic strip adaptation drawn by Masumi Futaba was serialied in Monthly Dragon Age magazine. A prequel light novel series titled Legend of Regios was published by Fujimi Shobo under its Style-F label. An anime adaptation produced by Zexcs aired on January 11, 2009, to June 20, 2009, and is licensed in North America by Funimation Entertainment. A spin-off light novel series titled Regios Crusade was published from 2009 to 2012. Another spin-off light novel series, My Journey with Regios, was published in 2009.

== Plot ==
On an alternate reality Earth overrun with mutated nano-machine-beasts called Filth Monsters (Contaminoids in Funimation's translation), humanity is forced to live in large mobile cities called Regios and learn to use weapons called DITE (pronounced Di-Te) and harnessing the power of Kei to defend themselves. The truth is that these are people lost in an alternative reality caught between struggling as pawns of the founders of this space and those trying to destroy it. Only upon its destruction can everything revert to the real world. However, many generations have passed since the creation of the world and naturally the citizens who inhabit it fight for their lives. In the Academic City of Zuellni, Layfon Alseif is hoping to start a new life without Martial/Military arts and forget his past. However, his past has caught the attention of Kalian Loss, the Student Council President and Nina Antalk, a Military Arts student and Captain of the 17th Platoon, who instantly recognizes his abilities and decides he's the perfect candidate to join her group. The series follow Layfon's life in Zuellni and occasionally has flashbacks of his life in Glenden as a Heaven's Blade.

== Media ==
=== Novels ===
The series finished with 25 light novel volumes - with 19 volumes of the main story-line and 6 being the side-story novels. The last 25th volume (which is an epilogue of the story) was published in September 2013 in Japan.

=== Anime ===
The anime adaptation started airing in January 2009 and was produced by Zexcs. At Anime Central 2010, North American anime distributor Funimation Entertainment announced that they have acquired the anime series.

The series made its North American television debut on September 19, 2011, on the Funimation Channel.

== Reception ==
The light novels have sold over five million copies.
