= List of science fiction television programs, U =

This is an inclusive list of science fiction television programs whose names begin with the letter U.

== U ==
Live-action

- UFO (1970–1971, UK)
- Ultra Series (franchise):
  - Ultra Q (1966, Japan)
  - Ultraman (1966–1967, Japan)
  - Ultra Seven (1967–1968, Japan)
  - Ultra Fight (1970–1971, Japan)
  - Return of Ultraman, The (1971–1972, Japan)
  - Ultraman Ace (1972–1973, Japan)
  - Ultraman Taro (1973–1974, Japan)
  - Ultraman Leo (1974–1975, Japan)
  - Ultraman 80 (1980–1981, Japan)
  - Ultraman: Towards the Future (1992, Australia/Japan)
  - Ultraman vs. Kamen Rider (1993, Japan, special)
  - Heisei Ultra Seven (1994, Japan)
  - Ultraman: The Ultimate Hero (1995, US/Japan)
  - Ultraman Tiga (1996–1997, Japan)
  - Ultraman Dyna (1997–1998, Japan)
  - Ultraman Gaia (1998–1999, Japan)
  - Ultraman Nice (1999–2000, Japan)
  - Ultraman Cosmos (2001–2002, Japan)
  - Ultra Q: Dark Fantasy (2004, Japan)
  - Ultraman Nexus (2004–2005, Japan)
  - Ultraman Max (2005–2006, Japan)
  - Ultraman Mebius (2006–2007, Japan)
  - Ultraseven X (2007, Japan)
  - Ultra Galaxy Mega Monster Battle (2007–2008, Japan)
  - Ultra Galaxy Mega Monster Battle: Never Ending Odyssey (2008–2009, Japan)
  - Neo Ultra Q (2013, Japan)
  - Ultraman Ginga (2013, Japan)
  - Ultraman Ginga S (2014, Japan)
  - Ultraman X (2015, Japan)
  - Ultraman Orb (2016, Japan)
- Ultraviolet (1998, UK) (elements of science fiction)
- Undermind (1965)
- Under the Dome (2013–2015)
- Under the Mountain (1981–1982, New Zealand, miniseries)
- Unforeseen, The (1960, UK, anthology) IMDb
- Uninvited, The (1997, UK)
- Unnatural History (2010, US/Canada, anthology) (elements of science fiction in some episodes)
- Urban Gothic (2000) (elements of science fiction in some episodes)
- UpGrade: The Web Series
- Utopia Falls (2020)

Animated

- UFO Warrior Dai Apolon (1976–1977, Japan, animated)
- Ultraman, The (1979–1980, Japan, animated)
- Ultraforce (1995, animated)
- Ulysses 31 a.k.a. Space Legend Ulysses 31 (Japan) (1981–1982, France/Japan, animated)
- Underdog (1964–1973, animated)
- URBO: The Adventures of Pax Afrika (2006, South Africa, animated)
