= Kamen Rider Hibiki & The Seven Senki =

Japanese name
- Kanji: 劇場版 仮面ライダー響鬼と7人の戦鬼
Transcriptions
- Revised Hepburn: Gekijōban Kamen Raidā Hibiki to Shichinin no Senki
- Directed by: Taro Sakamoto
- Written by: Toshiki Inoue
- Based on: Kamen Rider Hibiki by Tsuyoshi Kida; Shinji Oishi
- Produced by: Ishinomori Productions; Toei
- Starring: Shigeki Hosokawa; Rakuto Tochihara; Jyoji Shibue; Shingo Kawaguchi; Toshinobu Matsuo; Kenji Matsuda
- Cinematography: Masao Inokuma
- Edited by: Hideaki Ōhata
- Music by: Toshihiko Sahashi
- Distributed by: Toei Co. Ltd
- Release date: September 3, 2005
- Running time: 77 minutes; 89 minutes (Director's Cut)
- Country: Japan
- Language: Japanese
- Budget: $11,000,000

Kamen Rider Hibiki & The Seven Senki (劇場版 仮面ライダー響鬼と7人の戦鬼, Gekijōban Kamen Raidā Hibiki to Shichinin no Senki; Masked Rider Hibiki & The Seven War Ogres) is the movie for the Japanese tokusatsu production Kamen Rider Hibiki, directed by Taro Sakamoto and written by Toshiki Inoue. The movie's title and plot is a reference to the classic Akira Kurosawa film, Seven Samurai. This movie marks the debut of Kamen Rider Hibiki's final form prior to its appearance in the show, and also explains the history of the Makamou and Oni war.

The film was produced by Ishinomori Productions and Toei, the producers of all the previous television series and films under the Kamen Rider franchise. Following the tradition of all Heisei Kamen Rider movies, it is a double bill with 2005's Super Sentai movie, Mahou Sentai Magiranger: The Bride of Infershia.

This was the first of the Heisei era Kamen Rider movies to not have a two word subtitle.

This movie also served to introduce the new producer and writer team that would later go on to replace producer Shigenori Takatera and writer Tsuyoshi Kida within the main series.

== Plot ==
Hibiki and Asumu are on their way to a Makamou attack on the beach. Once they arrive there, they see dozens of people running from the massive Orochi, a beast rumored to be the strongest Makamou ever created. Once they arrive, Hibiki walks towards the Orochi and transforms, but all of his attacks prove useless against Orochi. The situation is made even more dire when Hibiki jumps in the way of an attack meant for Asumu. Taking the full force of the attack, Hibiki passes out as the Orochi swims away, leaving a panicking Asumu to get help. Hibiki ends up in the hospital and Asumu begins blaming himself for Hibiki's injuries. Feeling useless, he begins helping at Tachibana's, going through dozens of books to try to discover a way to defeat the Orochi. Upon coming across a book with his name on it, Asumu sits down and begins to read what turns out to be the history of Takeshi, the Oni and the Makamou war.

In the Sengoku period, a young boy who has the same resemblance and name as Asumu is wandering around with his childhood friend Hitoe. In this time, the humans all knew and feared the Makamou, sometimes forced to sacrifice one of their own to spare an entire village from the Makamou's wrath. Suzu was such a case as she was offered up as the yearly sacrifice to the Orochi to keep it from killing the villagers. After some protesting from the girl's father, the man was killed by Douji and Hime before Suzu and her father's corpse were consumed by the Orochi. A year later, a mark appears upon Hitoe's hand, making her as the next sacrifice to the Orochi. Asumu, unwilling to let her meet such a fate, sets out to find a way to stop it. Meeting the village elder Tobei and the others for such a means, learning the only way is to bring an Oni, though many villagers see them to be no different than the Makamou, despite the fact that they fight the monsters. Asumu understands the danger but insists on setting out in spite his own history with an Oni. Tobei sends along his daughters, Kazue and Hinako, to help.

The group then enters a town being attacking by a Makamou called Kaendaishou before it is defeated by an Oni named Kabuki who has been hired by the town's people to defeat the Makamou. After realizing that the people can only pay him with food, Kabuki offered some a younger boy, but the boy's mother quickly slaps the food away from the boy due to the taboo of humans' contact with the Oni. Learning of Asamu's blight, Kabuki offers his aid after telling him they need to gather allies to help them against the Orochi. To that end, Kabuki takes Asumu's group to find a small home where a former Oni named Hibiki lives. Asumu instantly declares his hatred for this man as he believes him to be the one that killed his brother. Asumu's older brother, Takeshi, was the apprentice to Hibiki and was killed one day in a rock slide. Asumu found Hibiki carrying his brother's body and assumed that Hibiki was his brother's killer. Without Hibiki, the group moves on to find the next Oni; Ibuki. They find Ibuki, who aided in the war and became daimyō. But bored with his life as a feudal lord, Ibuki quickly takes care of his court and leaves with the group. The group then heads on to a small temple, where they recruit a buddhist priest named Touki after Kabuki attempted to throws a rock at him to test his buddhist abilities.

The Oni then try to trick the Makamou by setting Ibuki up as the sacrifice in Hitoe's place. After finding out it was all a trick, the Makamou then attack Ibuki, who is quickly aided by Kabuki and Touki, the latter making quick work of the couple with his freezing power. But the Orochi then shows up and forces the Oni to leave the battle as the Douji and Hime threaten the villagers for their attempted defiance by giving them a month to redeem themselves or suffer the plague that they have inflicted on the girl. After Kirameki arrives too late for the fight, the group sets out to gain more partners. As the Douji and Hime discuss how to deal with their eventual meddling, the Oni group make a stop in a village, with Asumu following them until he is attacked by a group of Samurai and unknowingly being saved by Hibiki. The group then learn of Nishiki, the Oni thief who is to be executed for his crimes. The group comes to witness his public beheading, but Nishiki surprises everyone by catching the sword to be used in his beheading with his teeth. He then escapes and joins the group, who are being watched by a young girl that turns out to be a Makamou named Hitotsumi who specializes in killing Oni.

The Oni then find Habataki, who first refuses to join them now that he has a wife and son. However, Habataki agrees to join the group only after his wife persuades him to take up the cause again as long as he returns to her alive. While they are traveling, they find Todoroki being attacked by Bakegani. Nishiki, Habataki and Kirameki help him dispatching the Oni before he tells them that Hibiki sent him to help them out. Back at Asumu's village, Hitoe illness worsens as she has gone to a cave to hide, with a group of villagers looking for her as the Oni returned. The villagers are found murdered later, with Nishiki's weapon at the scene. The house where the Oni are staying is then burnt down, and the Oni are told by the villagers that Nishiki's weapon was found at the sight of the murders and Hitoe saw the murderer to be an Oni. The group of Oni then get into a fight over the situation if they should fight back against the humans or not, but the fight is broken up once Hibiki comes along. It is then revealed to Asumu that Hibiki did not kill his brother, and that his brother was crafting a special sword for him.

Hitoe is then brought home, identifying Kabuki as the one who killed the villagers and left Nishiki's weapon there to frame him. Though Hibiki and Asumu were confused, Kabuki reveals his intentions as he and Kaendaishou attack Hibiki, the two get away without Hitoe. The group of Oni then break up and head their own ways, but before doing so, Todoroki returns Hibiki's tuning fork and Disc Animals to him. While this occurred, before taken to be sacrificed, Hitoe takes Asamu to the cave he and brother played, finding a katana that Takeshi made for Hibiki before his death. Asumu makes his way to Hibiki as Kabuki ambushes him at his home, handing Hibiki the katana and asking him to fight for the memory of his brother. Taking the request to heart, Hibiki transforms and fends off Kabuki after killing Kaendaishou. After a long battle Hibiki, defeats Kabuki as he and Asumu make their way to the beach as Hitotsumi devours Kabuki. Arriving, Hibiki begins fighting with a massive group of Ninja Makamou as Asumu saves Hitoe. But outnumbered, the tie turns when the other Oni arrive to help Hibiki, killing Hitotsumi and the Douji/Hime pair. The battle goes on until Hibiki comes head to head with the Orochi. At the climax of the battle, the katana is swiped away from Hibiki's hands and into the sea.

In the present, Asumu sees that the last page to the book is missing and not showing how that battle ended. Asumu then finds out that Hibiki is well and fighting the Orochi again. Sensing a presence in the nearby cave, Asumu finds the katana from the story he read and hands it to Hibiki, changing into the Armed Saber as he becomes Armed Hibiki and defeats the Orochi. In the past, in aftermath of their win over the Makamou army, Hibiki and the other Oni take their leave to be of service elsewhere. As the villagers rebuild their home, they decide that a human and Oni partnership would be best for both sides in the future, with Asumu naming this group "Takeshi", honoring the memory of his brother.

== Characters ==
=== TV Series (Present) ===
- Hibiki / Kamen Rider Hibiki - Plays the same role as in the TV series. Hibiki is greatly injured at the start of the movie.
- Asumu Adachi - Plays the same role as in the TV series. He was saved by Hibiki when they faced a Makamou which causes Hibiki to be injured. This leads Asumu to read the book that contains the history of the Makamou and how it's entangled with the history of TAKESHI and the Oni & learns that his meeting with the Oni is no mere coincidence.

=== Past ===
These characters possess a resemblance to the present-time characters.

- Hibiki - The original Hibiki is a quiet man. After blaming himself for Takeshi's death, he gave up being an Oni. However, when he and his allies discover that Kabuki had secretly betrayed them and sided with Makamou, the original Hibiki reassumes his Oni duty in the near-climax.
- Ibuki - The original Ibuki played a role in the war that gave him a position as daimyō. However, he become bored with his new position over time, setting out with the group searching for adventure as an Oni.
- Todoroki - The Todoroki of the past is a carpenter Oni with no real master. The group suddenly met him on the way.
- Asumu - Bearing a likeness to the Asumu of the present, he was the reason of the Oni gathering to defeat the Orochi. He is also one of the founding members of TAKESHI.

=== Movie Edition Oni ===
==== Kamen Rider Kabuki ====
Kabuki is a Taiko Oni and is one of the antagonists in the movie, having double-crossed Asumu and the others into believing he cares for humans (as per his staged fight with a Makamou). He also caused trouble among the seven Oni when they were accused of attacking humans (with Nishiki's weapons found beside a murdered man, while it was actually him who committed it). He revealed that he was disillusioned with his relation with humans because no matter how hard he fights and risks his life for them, they just call him an Oni, a monster, an animal. Thus he forms a pact with the Makamou to become one of them. He has a soft spot, however, for children because even upon his defeat by Hibiki and death at the hands of Hitotsumi, he pleads for Asumu's safety.

==== Kamen Rider Touki ====
A buddhist monk who spends his days praying at a local temple until Asumu and his group come upon him. He bears a resemblance to the present day Kamen Rider Zanki.

==== Kamen Rider Kirameki ====
Kirameki was Touki's partner years ago until an incident with an Ittanmomen resulted with Kirameki running off, leaving Touki to fend the Makamou off on his own. As a result, Kirameki was labeled a coward no one wanted to associated with. However, Kirameki joins the group of Oni when he arrives in his kite and suggests getting more reinforcements.

==== Kamen Rider Nishiki ====
A thief Oni who loves money, Nishiki is often caught in situations leading people to believe he is a criminal. He refused to join the Oni group at first until tricked in believing there's buried treasure in the village they're saving.

==== Kamen Rider Habataki ====
Habataki is one of the older Oni. He fought in a war years ago and has since given up the Oni life to settle down as a farmer together with his family.

=== Movie Kamen Rider Arsenal and technique ===
- Kabuki
  - Henshin Onsa Onkaku (変身音叉・音角): A black tuning fork transformation device.
    - Meitō Onsaken (鳴刀・音叉剣): The Onkaku's sword form.
  - Ongekiko (音撃鼓): A taiko buckle.
  - Ongekibō Ressui (音撃棒・烈翠): A pair of drum sticks Ongeki weapon.
  - Ongeki Da Gōka Kenran (音撃打・業火絢爛): Ongeki Finisher.
- Touki
  - Henshin Onsa Onkaku (変身音叉・音角): A bronze tuning fork transformation device.
    - Meitō Onsaken (鳴刀・音叉剣): The Onkaku's sword form.
  - Ongekiko (音撃鼓): A taiko buckle.
  - Ongeki Kanabō Rettō (音撃金棒・烈凍): A gong stick Ongeki weapon.
  - Ongeki Ō Ichigeki Dotō (音撃殴・一撃怒涛): Ongeki Finisher.
- Kirameki
  - Henshin Onsa Onkaku (変身音叉・音角): A silver tuning fork transformation device.
    - Meitō Onsaken (鳴刀・音叉剣): The Onkaku's sword form.
  - Ongekimei (音撃鳴): A trumpet buckle.
  - Ongeki Cymbal Retsuban (音撃震張・烈盤, Ongeki Shinbaru Retsuban) A cymbal Ongeki weapon.
  - Ongeki Hyō Keichō Fubaku (音撃拍・軽佻訃爆): Ongeki Finisher.
- Nishiki
  - Henshin Onsa Onkaku (変身音叉・音角): A clear red tuning fork transformation device.
    - Meitō Onsaken (鳴刀・音叉剣): The Onkaku's sword form.
  - Ongekiko (音撃鼓): A taiko buckle.
  - Ongeki Sankaku Ressetsu (音撃三角・烈節, Ongeki Sankaku Ressetsu): A triangle Ongeki weapon.
  - Ongeki Kyō Irasshai (音撃響・偉羅射威): Ongeki Finisher.
- Habataki
  - Henshin Onsa Onkaku (変身音叉・音角): A golden tuning fork transformation device.
    - Meitō Onsaken (鳴刀・音叉剣): The Onkaku's sword form.
  - Ongekimei (音撃鳴): A trumpet buckle.
  - Ongeki Fue Rekkū (音撃吹道・烈空, Ongeki Fue Rekkū): A flute Ongeki weapon.
  - Ongeki Sō Senpū Issen (音撃奏・旋風一閃): Ongeki Finisher.

== Takeshi ==
While the movie's version of how Hibiki became Armed Hibiki and gained the Armed Saber is different than the television series, the rest of the movie is considered to be canon. Much of the history of the Makamou and Oni was only mentioned in small dialogue in the television series. It was not until the movie was released that the true heritage of the partnership between the Oni and the humans was revealed, as well as the history of the war between the Makamou and the Oni. It is believed that the Makamou history was simply written off as myths by modern-day humans. Thus, they are unaware of the existence of the Oni and Makamou.

== Cast ==
- Hibiki (ヒビキ): Shigeki Hosokawa (細川 茂樹, Hosokawa Shigeki)
- Asumu Adachi (安達 明日夢, Adachi Asumu), Asumu (明日夢): Rakuto Tochihara (栩原 楽人, Tochihara Rakuto)
- Ibuki (イブキ): Jouji Shibue (渋江 譲二, Shibue Jōji)
- Todoroki (トドロキ): Shingo Kawaguchi (川口 真五, Kawaguchi Shingo)
- Kabuki (カブキ): Toshinobu Matsuo (松尾 敏伸, Matsuo Toshinobu)
- Touki (トウキ, Tōki): Kenji Matsuda (松田 賢二, Matsuda Kenji)
- Kirameki (キラメキ): So Yamanaka (山中 聡, Yamanaka Sō)
- Nishiki (ニシキ): Masaki Kitahara (北原 雅樹, Kitahara Masaki)
- Habataki (ハバタキ): Takeyuki Yue (湯江 健幸, Yue Takeyuki)
- Kasumi Tachibana (立花 香須実, Tachibana Kasumi), Kazue (かずえ): : Mayu Gamou (蒲生 麻由, Gamō Mayu)
- Hinaka Tachibana (立花 日菜佳, Tachibana Hinaka), Hinako (ひなこ): : Miyuki Kanbe (神戸 みゆき, Kanbe Miyuki)
- Hitoe (ひとえ): Erika Mori (森 絵梨佳, Mori Erika)
- Suzu (鈴): Nana Akiyama (秋山 奈々, Akiyama Nana)
- Mother (母親, Hahaoya): Kaoru Mizuki (水木 薫, Mizuki Kaoru)
- Habataki's Wife (ハバタキの女房, Habataki no Nyōbō): Masako Umemiya (梅宮 万紗子, Umemiya Masako)
- Hitotsumi (ヒトツミ): Asami Abe (安倍 麻美, Abe Asami)
- Douji (童子, Dōji): Mitsu Murata (村田 充, Murata Mitsu)
- Hime (姫): Sei Ashina (芦名 星, Ashina Sei)
- Suzu's Father (鈴の父, Suzu no Chichi): Ichiro Ogura (小倉 一郎, Ogura Ichirō)
- Suzu's Mother (鈴の母, Suzu no Haha): Kiriko Shimizu (志水 季里子, Shimizu Kiriko)
- Villagers (村人, Murabito): Kazumasa Taguchi (田口 主将, Taguchi Kazumasa), Ryo Ono (小野 了, Ono Ryō)
- Town Girl (町娘, Machimusume): Yuko Murakami (村上 祐子, Murakami Yūko; of TV Asahi Announcer)
- Government Official (役人, Yakunin): Muga Tsukaji (塚地 武雅, Tsukaji Muga; of Drunk Dragon)
- Takeshi (猛士): Kotaro Koizumi (小泉 孝太郎, Koizumi Kōtarō)
- Ichiro Tachibana (立花 勢地郎, Tachibana Ichirō), Tobei (藤兵衛, Tōbei): : Atomu Shimojō (下條 アトム, Shimojō Atomu)
- Hitotsumi (ヒトツミ; Voice): Nobutoshi Canna (神奈 延年, Kan'na Nobutoshi)

== Manga Adaptation ==
The film is an adapted in a full 3 chapter manga book which is closely related to the film except there are few difference the present framing is removed.

== Songs ==
Theme song

- "Flashback"
  - Lyrics: Shoko Fujibayashi
  - Rap Lyrics: m.c.A.T
  - Composition & Arrangement: Isamu Taihei & SJR
  - Artist: Rin' featuring m.c.A.T
