= Rakuto Tochihara =

Japanese former actor (born 1989)

- 栩原 楽人
- Born: October 19, 1989 (age 36); Tokyo, Japan
- Occupation: Actor
- Years active: 2000–2018

Rakuto Tochihara (栩原 楽人, Tochihara Rakuto; born October 19, 1989) is a Japanese former actor from Tokyo, a graduate of Horikoshi High School. His debut role was in Boogiepop Phantom where he voiced the character Poom Poom. He later had a starring role in the 2005 Kamen Rider Series Kamen Rider Hibiki and its film Kamen Rider Hibiki & The Seven Senki as the character Asumu Adachi. His roles have also included the drama RH Plus as Ageha Seto and in the film Aquarian Age: The Movie as Naoya Itsuki. On February 28, 2018, he announced his decision to retire from the entertainment industry to take over his father's company.

== Filmography ==
=== Films ===
- Kamen Rider Hibiki & The Seven Senki (2005) – Asumu Adachi
- One Missed Call: Final (2007) – Shin'ichi Imahara
- Battle of Demons (2009) - Minaha Hayasaki
- Junjou (2010) - Keisuke Tozaki
- Nana to Kaoru (2011) – Kaoru
- Nana to Kaoru: Chapter 2 (2012) – Kaoru
- The Eternal Zero (2013) – Teranishi
- Tokusou Sentai Dekaranger: 10 Years after (2015) - Assam Asimov
- A Man Called Pirate (2016)

=== Television ===
- Kamen Rider Hibiki (2005 –2006) – Asumu Adachi
- RH Plus (2008) - Seto Ageha
- Ryōmaden (2010) – Okita Sōji
- Teen Court: 10-dai Saiban (2012) – Kunio Sakai

=== Television animation ===
- Eden of the East (2009) – Policeman

=== Video games ===
- Saikin Koi Shiteru? (2009) - Ruka Kazama
