= Mitsu Murata =

Japanese actor

- 村田 充
- Born: August 18, 1977 (age 48); Osaka Prefecture, Japan
- Occupations: Actor; model
- Years active: 2000–2017; 2019–present
- Agent: Orions Belt
- Height: 187 cm (6 ft 2 in)
- Spouse: Sayaka Kanda (m. 2017; div. 2019)
- Website: Official profile

Mitsu Murata (村田 充, Murata Mitsu; born August 18, 1977) is a Japanese actor, fashion model and DJ/music producer, best known for his roles as Douji in the 2005 tokusatsu series Kamen Rider Hibiki and Bishop in the 2008 series Kamen Rider Kiva. As a DJ, Murata goes under the name "Mitsuu", having released remixes for some musicians, including High and Mighty Color and Jyongri. He is currently employed by Orions Belt.

== Personal life ==
In May 2017, Murata married actress Sayaka Kanda. The couple announced their divorce in December 2019 citing personal differences as the cause.

== Filmography ==
=== Television ===
- Nisennen no Koi (Fuji TV, 2000) as Kai Moriet
- Sora Kara Furu Ichioku no Hoshi (Fuji TV, 2002) – episodes 1, 2
- Saigo no Bengonin (NTV, 2003) as Toshihito Nakano
- Tokumei Kakarichō Tadano Hitoshi (TV Asahi, 2003) – episode 8
- Sky High 2 (TV Asahi, 2004) – episode 8
- Vampire Host (TV Tokyo, 2004) as Katsuragi Yuji – episode 4
- Kamen Rider Hibiki (TV Asahi, 2005) as Douji, Parent Hime (Voice)
- Tissue (TV Asahi, 2007) as Saeki Naoki
- Kamen Rider Kiva (TV Asahi, 2008) as Bishop
- Kamen Rider Wizard (TV Asahi, 2013) as Naito/Legion – episode 30, 31

=== Cinema ===
- Go (2001) as Kato
- Platonic Sex (2001)
- Returner (2002)
- Eau de Vie (2003)
- Battle Royale II: Requiem (2003) as Soji Kazama
- Showa Kayo Daizenshu (2003)
- Road 88 (2004)
- The Neighbor No. Thirteen (2005)
- Irasshaimase, Kanja-sama (2005)
- Kamen Rider Hibiki & The Seven Senki (2005) as Douji
- Limit of Love: Umizaru (2006) as Atsushi Kawaguchi
- Black Kiss (2006)
- Taki183 (2006)
- Aishiau koto shika dekinai (2007)
- Kaiji (2009) as Kōji Uda

== Other media ==
=== Theatre ===
- Himizu (2004)
- Ore ga Blue Hearts to Downtown wo Suki ni natte Riyuu (2007)
- Rorschach (2007)
- Bungō Stray Dogs on Stage: Dead Apple (2021)
