= Shingo Kawaguchi =

Japanese actor

- 川口 真五
- Born: February 4, 1978 (age 48); Aichi Prefecture, Japan
- Occupation: Actor
- Years active: 1999–present

Shingo Kawaguchi (川口 真五, Kawaguchi Shingo; born February 4, 1978) is a Japanese actor who has appeared in a number of feature films and television series. He is represented by the talent agency Orega.

== Filmography ==
=== TV series ===
Year	Title	Role	Network	Notes
2002	Aibō		TV Asahi	Season 1, Episode 5
2003	Chocolat		MBS	
2005	Kamen Rider Hibiki	Todoroki / Kamen Rider Todoroki	TV Asahi	
2009	Kamen Rider Decade	Todoroki / Kamen Rider Todoroki	TV Asahi	Episodes 18 and 19
2009	Aibō	Atsuo Takei	TV Asahi	Season 8, Episode 3
2013	Kamen Rider Wizard	Masahiro Yamamoto / Kamen Rider Mage	TV Asahi	Episodes 46 to 51
2019	Kamen Rider Zi-O	Todoroki / Kamen Rider Todoroki	TV Asahi	Episode 33 and 34

=== Films ===
Year	Title	Role	Notes
2005	Kamen Rider Hibiki & The Seven Senki	Todoroki / Kamen Rider Todoroki	
2007	Kamen Rider Den-O: I'm Born!	Sasuke	
2009	Heaven's Door		
2013	Kamen Rider × Kamen Rider Gaim & Wizard: The Fateful Sengoku Movie Battle	Masahiro Yamamoto / Kamen Rider Mage	
