= Jouji Shibue =

Japanese model and actor (born 1983)

- 渋江 譲二
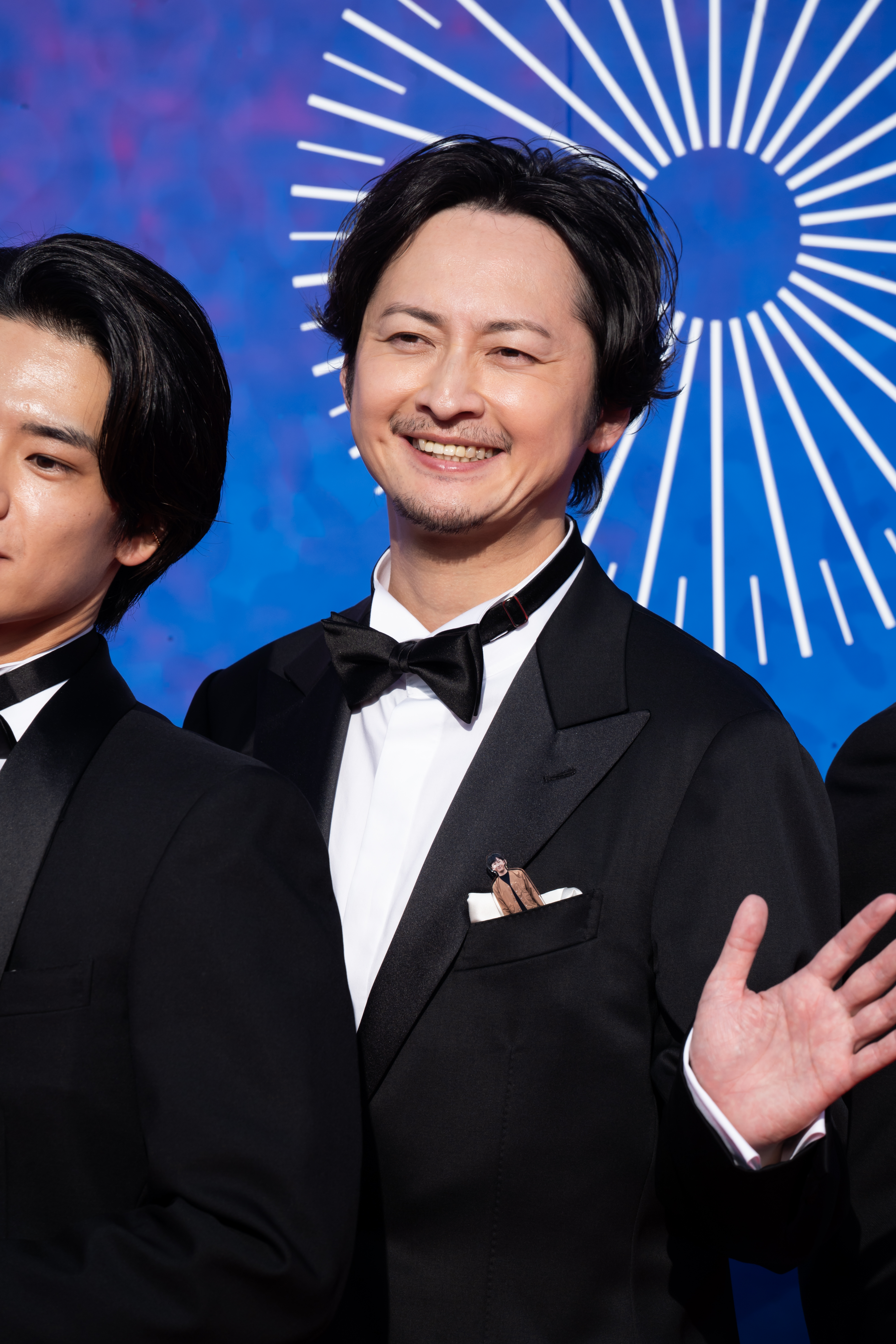
- Shibue at the Yokohama International Film Festival in 2023
- Born: March 15, 1983 (age 43); Suwa, Nagano, Japan
- Other name: Jyoji Shibue
- Occupations: Actor; model
- Years active: 2003–present

Jouji Shibue (渋江 譲二, Shibue Jōji; born on March 15, 1983) is a Japanese actor and model. His first major acting role was as Mamoru Chiba (Tuxedo Kamen/Prince Endymion) in the live action Pretty Guardian Sailor Moon. After finishing PGSM, Shibue has appeared in Kamen Rider Hibiki as Ibuki (Kamen Rider Ibuki), later reprising his role for the world of Hibiki in Kamen Rider Decade. He had a role in Rina Aiuchi's music video "Full Jump" and also does commercials for "NTT Docomo Chūgoku" and "AU." Shibue has modeled for "Hotdog Press" and "Junon".

== Filmography ==
=== Series ===
- 2003-2004: Pretty Guardian Sailor Moon – Mamoru Chiba/Tuxedo Kamen/Prince Endymion
- 2005-2006: Kamen Rider Hibiki – Ibuki / Kamen Rider Ibuki (voice)
- 2006: Yoruō 〜 YAOH 〜 – host club role of "gorgeous" (episode 11)
- 2006: Tōbō-sha Orin – Shinpachi (episode 6)
- 2007: Ai no gekijō: Sand Chronicles – Tsukishima Fuji (adult age)
- 2007: Ai no gekijō: Ainōta! – Kimura Akira
- 2007: Sexy Voice and Robo Hayashi Kazumi no atarashī kare (episode 2)
- 2007: Hotaru no Hikari – Tadokoro Junpei
- 2008: Binbō Danshi Bonbi Men – Sunakawa Takayuki
- 2008: Hisho no Kagami – Hoshino Satoru
- 2008: Monday Golden: Tsuwano Satsujin Jiken – Toki Tomoyoshi
- 2008: Monday Golden: Yamamura Misa Suspense: Sen no Rikyu Nazo no Satsujin Jiken – Sakai Toshiki
- 2008: Aishu No Romera – Kogure Satoru
- 2009: O cha-beri – Kōsaka Junichi (episode 17)
- 2009: Kamen Rider Decade – Ibuki / Kamen Rider Ibuki (voice)
- 2009: LOVE GAME – host/ Hatano Ryūji (episode 8)
- 2009: Oretachi wa Tenshi da! NO ANGEL NO LUCK! – CAP/ Inui Kyōsuke
- 2010: Doyō Jidaigeki: Katsura Chidzuru Shinsatsu Nichiroku – Shōza (episode 7)
- 2010: Saturday Wide Theater: Jinrui gakusha: Misaki Kumiko no satsujin kantei shirīzu Sunahama o samayō hakkotsu shitai! – Naoki Moriya
- 2010: Saturday Wide Theater: Nishimura Kyōtarō Travel Mystery 54 Izu noumi ni kieta on'na- Osamu Sakai
- 2010: Yamamura Misa Suspense: Kyouto Genjimonogatari Satsujin Emaki – Yamada Takashi
- 2011: Saturday Wide Theater: Jinrui gakusha: Misaki Kumiko no satsujin kantei shirīzu Shisha o yomigaera seru wain no nazo!? – Moriya Naoki
- 2011: Shin Keishichō sōsaikka 9 kakari season3 Episode 2 – Ichiro Saito
- 2011: Doku hime to watashi – Nakagawa Tetsuya
- 2011: Ranma 1/2 – Kamaitachi
- 2012: Saturday Wide Theater: Nishimura Kyōtarō Travel Mystery 58 Yamagata shinkansen Tsubasa 129-gō no on'na! – Kinoshita Naoya
- 2012: Shirato Osamu no Jikenbo Fifth and sixth story – Mizusawa Tetsurō
- 2012: Deka Kurokawa Suzuki – Inoue Shinichirō (episode 10)
- 2012: Asadora: Umechan Sensei – Tsuda (first College of Physicians)
- 2012: Tsugunai – Kawaji Tatsurō
- 2013: Saturday Wide Theater: Yamagata shinkansen Tsubasa 129-gō no on'na! – Adachi detective
- 2013: Zyuden Sentai Kyoryuger – Nakazato Hiroshi (episode 15)
- 2018: Black Pean - Masato Fukumoto
- 2019: Kishiryu Sentai Ryusoulger – Master Blue
- 2020: Only I Am 17 Years Old
- 2026: Super Space Sheriff Gavan Infinity - Goran (episode 12)

=== Films ===
- 2005: Kamen Rider Hibiki & The Seven Senki – Ibuki / Kamen Rider Ibuki (voice)
- 2007: Callaway – Makoto
- 2010: Kurosawa Eiga – Shibue Joji (principal role)
- 2010: Gachiban MAX II – host role (cameo appearance)
- 2010: Kimi e no Melody – Kiriya Tsuyoshi
- 2011: Furusato ga Eri – Aida Kanji (starring)
- 2011: Hana Bāchan!! 〜 Watashi no Yama no Kamisama 〜 – Tokoro Kazushi
- 2022: Residents of Evil
- 2022: Love of a Brute
- 2023: Mujō no Sekai
- 2024: During the Rains
