= RH Plus =

2006 manga series

- Cover of the first manga volume.

RHプラス (Āru Eichi Purasu)
- Genre: Drama, Romance, Supernatural, Boys' Love
- Manga
- Written by: Ayako Suwa
- Published by: Enterbrain
- English publisher: NA: Digital Manga Publishing
- Magazine: B's-Log Comic
- Original run: March 12, 2006 – May 12, 2009
- Volumes: 4
- Television drama
- Directed by: Ryūichi Ichino; Mochi Aida
- Written by: Megumu Sasano; Kimiko Ueno
- Music by: Tajiri Mitsutaka
- Licensed by: Crunchyroll
- Original network: Tokyo MX
- Original run: January 2, 2008 – March 26, 2008
- Episodes: 13

RH Plus (Japanese: RHプラス, Hepburn: Āru Eichi Purasu) is a Japanese manga series written and illustrated by Ayako Suwa, serialized in Enterbrain's B's-Log Comic between 2006 and 2009. The series has been collected in four tankōbon volumes and was licensed in English by Digital Manga Publishing. A live-action series adaptation premiered on January 2, 2008.

== Plot ==
The series follows the daily lives of a family of vampires that lives together in a European-style building known as 'Eternal Moon Mansion'. Kiyoi is the eldest who takes care of the others and acts as a father figure, Masakazu is a college student who gets information on criminal activities, while the youngest members, Ageha and Makoto, are high school students. Both of them tend to end up helping Masakazu, whether they really want to or not. They fight against crime when the cops are unwilling or unable to do so.

== Characters ==
Makoto Nogami (野 上誠, Nogami Makoto)
Portrayed by: Yū Miura
A sixteen-year-old high school student. Makoto is an introverted and reserved boy who rarely speaks and never says what he is really thinking. He is half-vampire and half-human; his mother abandoned him in a church when he was a child, condemning him as a 'demon' and regretting giving birth to him. In the church, he was abused by a priest, which left a big trauma on him. He was taken in by Kiyoi after a suicide attempt. Although he initially felt that he could not fit into the family, he later feels comfortable living with the others.
Ageha Setō (瀬戸 あげは, Setō Ageha)
Portrayed by: Rakuto Tochihara
Originally a human, Ageha was the first who was adopted by Kiyoi after the death of his parents and grandmother when he was still very young. He is very close to Kiyoi, whom he loves deeply and views him as a father figure. Childish and carefree, he is very sensitive and has the ability to sympathize with other vampires.
Masakazu Tamura (田村 政和, Tamura Masakazu)
Portrayed by: Naoya Ojima
A college student, the second to be adopted by Kiyoi. Masakazu is very naive and often acts stupidly, however, he is a dedicate reader and has an excellent memory, allowing him to memorize a lot of information. His room is full of books and is always messy. His parents were vampires and he arrived at Eternal Moon Mansion when he was around fifteen years old. He has proclaimed himself as the "Goukon Prince", although he never has any luck with girls.
Kiyoi (きよい)
Portrayed by: Hassei Takano
The owner of Eternal Moon Mansion and the legal guardian of Makoto, Ageha, and Masakazu. At first glance he appears to be in his thirties, but actually he is over 100 years old. Kiyoi is very polite and kind, although he can be very scary when he is angry. He is prone to melancholy and sadness since the death of Dōzan, the man he was in love with. He feels angry because Dōzan didn't agree to become a vampire, choosing instead to die as a human, which also caused him to have a lot of repressed anger. Because he knows the pain of losing someone dear, he considers his current family very important and often overprotects the boys.
Haruka Konoe (此衣 遥, Konoe Haruka)
Portrayed by: Rei Fujita
A vampire, a university student who meets Masakazu during a goukon and since then rivals with him for the attention of the girls. He visits Eternal Moon Mansion occasionally, to the great annoyance of Masakazu. He is very handsome and charismatic, and the object of desire for many girls.
Ami Misaki (岬亜 美, Misaki Ami)
Portrayed by: Haruka Tomatsu
Makoto and Ageha's classmate. At first, she considered her life as boring and after discovering that Makoto was a vampire, she kidnaps him and wants him to bite her in order to become a vampire as well. After being stopped by Kiyoi, she acknowledges what she has done and apologizes to Makoto. She ends up obsessing with Kiyoi, visiting Eternal Moon Mansion very often and rivaling with Ageha for the later's attention. Her character is only relevant in the drama. In the manga, her name is never mentioned and after the incident, she is transferred to another school.
Michitaka (道隆)
Portrayed by: Kentarō Miyagi
Mainly known as 'Mister', is Dōzan's grandson and the one who assigns cases to Kiyoi and the boys. He looks like his grandfather when he was young, although according to Kiyoi, his personality is quite the opposite. He often complains to Kiyoi that he cannot understand his hobby of playing 'to be a family' with the boys, but he still respects his decisions. He seems to have a one-sided love for Kiyoi.
Dōzan (道山)
Portrayed by: Kentarō Miyagi
Is the late grandfather of Michitaka. Although his relationship with Kiyoi is never fully explained, both used to be good friends in the past and it's show that Kiyoi was in love with him. He only appears in flashbacks, and he left Eternal Moon Mansion to Kiyoi after he died. His death deeply affected Kiyoi, who even after more than ten years he still mourns his death.

== Media ==
=== Manga ===
The series was serialized in Enterbrain's B's-Log Comic from March 12, 2006, to May 12, 2009. Four volumes have been published in Japan. The manga has been licensed for publication in the North America by Digital Manga Publishing. In Germany, it was licensed by Egmont Manga.

=== Live-action ===
A live-action series adaptation produced by Tokyo MX was announced on December 18, 2007. The series was released on January 2, 2008, and ended on March 26, 2008. It was directed by Ryūichi Ichino, written by Megumu Sasano and Kimiko Ueno, and starred by Yū Miura, Rakuto Tochihara, Naoya Ojima, and Hassei Takano. The series was licensed in the United States by Crunchyroll.
