= Shigeki Hosokawa =

Japanese actor (born 1971)

Shigeki Hosokawa (細川茂樹)
- Born: December 16, 1971 (age 54); Gifu Prefecture, Japan
- Occupation: Actor
- Years active: 1994–2016
- Spouse: Mamiko Mise (m. 2011)
- Website: ameblo.jp/hosokawashigeki-official/

Shigeki Hosokawa (細川 茂樹, Hosokawa Shigeki; born December 16, 1971) is a Japanese actor.

== Biography ==
Shigeki Hosokawa attended Ogaki Municipal North Elementary School and Ogaki Municipal North Junior High School. He then graduated from Ogaki Public High School in 1988. He had his first acting role in a TBS J-Drama (Japanese drama) in 1994. He then made a brief appearance on a variety game show in the same year.

From 1995 to 2000, he was a professional model. He took time off from modeling in 2002 to study acting more thoroughly. He did not go to an acting school after his high school graduation so he used this time to improve his skill. Though mainly a model from 1995 to 2002, he had bit parts in commercials and drama series. One of his more notable roles during his "time off" from acting was as Takeda-sensei, a teacher in the hit live-action adaptation of GTO.

In late 2004, it was announced that Shigeki Hosokawa would be the lead in the then upcoming season of the long running Kamen Rider franchise, Kamen Rider Hibiki. He drew fans from both the target demographic of children and house wives alike. His role as Hibiki garnered many good reviews from Japanese critics. After Kamen Rider Hibiki finished airing, he then landed the role of Taira no Shigehira in the Samurai Drama, Yoshitsune. Both Kamen Rider Hibiki and Yoshitsune aired in the 8:00 time slot, AM and PM respectively. Because both shows aired in different 8 o'clock timeslots, he has been given the nickname "The 8 o'clock man" in Japan. Hosokawa's next major role was that of the ill-fated F.B.I. agent, Raye Iwamatsu, in the live action adaptations of the Death Note manga. He then went on to play the father character in the TV movie, Kaigo Etoile (The Nursing Care Star) which will start its Japanese airing on September 18, 2006. He played the father of the main character. His role is that of an aging and divorced father who has developed dementia.

He played the lead role in a one-hour live action special that served as a prologue to the Skullman anime series.

In 2016, Shigeki Hosokawa's contract period of the affiliated office "Samday" was unilaterally canceled, with Hosokawa applying to the Tokyo District Court in January 2017 to protest this sudden cancelation. The next month, a provisional disposition was decided to continue Hosokawa's contract, with it formally ending in May 2017. During and after this time period, the Japanese media would portray Hosokawa in an unpleasant manner, accusing his sudden contract termination as the result of him committing acts of "harassment".

In response to these broadcast, Hosokawa submitted a petition to the BPO in January 2018, stating that "there was a malicious aim to infringe on my honor and credibility." Ultimately, the Tokyo District Court accepted Hosokawa's claim, proving his innocence. However, despite having been a victim of misinformation, Hosokawa's career as an actor was severely affected by this incident, with his reprisal of Hitoshi Hidaka/Kamen Rider Hibiki being a difficult issue altogether.

== Filmography ==
=== Television ===
- Kindan no kajitsu (1994)
- Kimi to ita natsu (1994)
- Kagayaku toki no naka de (1995)
- Campus Note (1996) as Miura Masahiko
- Coach (1996) as Nobuo Komatsuzawa
- Ii hito (1997) as Yosuke Uemura
- Kanojo Tachi no Kekkon (1997) as Atsushi Mochizuki
- Great Teacher Onizuka (1998)
- Kōritsuku Natsu (1998) as Tatsuhiko Konno
- Out ~ Tsumatachi no Hanzai (1999) as Tsutomu Mayama
- Peach na Kankei (1999)
- Joi: Nothing Lasts Forever (1999) as Makoto Sodou
- Furuhata Ninzaburō 2 (1999)
- Border: Hanzai Shinri Sōsa File (1999)
- Aijin No Okite (2000) as Naoki Akimoto
- Gekka no Kishi (2000) as Masumi Koda
- Îzu Kiken na tobira: Ai wo tejô de tsunagu toki (2001)
- Hikeshiya Komachi (2004) as Keizuke Nakayama
- Blue Moshiku wa Blue (2003) as Kawami
- Officer Ichiro (2003) as Keiji Ichiro
- My Little Chef (2002) as Masato Adachi
- Local News, Section 3 (2001) as Kochira Dai San Shakaibu
- Kaigo Etoile (2005)
- Yoshitsune (2005) as Taira no Shigehira
- Kamen Rider Hibiki (2005–2006) as Hibiki (Hitoshi Hidaka)
- Skull Man: Prologue of Darkness (2007) as Hiroshi Kozumi

=== Television commercials ===
- The Nikkei (日本経済新聞) (2004)
- Tiovita Drink (Taiho Pharmaceutical; チオビタドリンク)
- Oronamin C (Otsuka Pharmaceutical; オロナミン) as Hibiki

=== Movies ===
- Kamen Rider Hibiki & The Seven Senki (2005) as Hibiki
- Death Note (2006) as Raye Iwamatsu
- Koharu Beauty (?)

=== Video games ===
- Kamen Rider: Battride War Genesis (2016) as Hibiki (voice)
- Kamen Rider Hibiki (2005) as Hibiki (voice)
- es (2001) as Keigo Nakanishi

=== Dubbing ===
Original year	Dub year	Title	Role	Original actor	Notes	Ref
2010		The Amazing Race 16	Steve Smith	-		
