= Sei Ashina =

Japanese actress (1983–2020)

- 芦名 星
- Born: Aya Igarashi (五十嵐 彩); 22 November 1983; Fukushima, Japan
- Died: 14 September 2020 (aged 36); Shinjuku, Tokyo, Japan
- Occupation: Actress
- Years active: 2002–2020
- Agent: Horipro
- Height: 1.65 m (5 ft 5 in)
- Website: www.horipro.co.jp/ashinasei/

Aya Igarashi (五十嵐 彩, Igarashi Aya; November 22, 1983 – September 14, 2020), known professionally as Sei Ashina (芦名 星, Ashina Sei), was a Japanese actress.

== Career ==
She was born Igarashi Aya, and assumed the stage name Sei Ashina. Prior to her acting career, Ashina was a model. She made her acting debut in the 2002 Tokyo Broadcasting System Television series The Tail of Happiness (しあわせのシッポ), modeling that year in magazines including Shogakukan's CanCam and Shueisha's Pinky, and was best known for starring as Hime in Kamen Rider Hibiki. She was also known for her role as The Girl, an unnamed concubine, in Silk (2007).

Ashina died on September 14, 2020, at age 36. Her body was found at her home in Shinjuku in a suspected suicide.

== Filmography ==
=== Movies ===
- Sekai no Owari (2004)
- Kamen Rider Hibiki & The Seven Senki (2005) – Hime (姫)
- Silk (2007) – The Girl
- Tatoe Sekai ga Owattemo (2007)
- Mayu-Kokoro no Hoshi- (2007)
- Kamui Gaiden (2009)
- NANASE: The Psychic Wanderers (2010)
- Tale of Genji: A Thousand Year Engima (2011)
- Killing For The Prosecution (2018)
- Impossibility Defense (2018)
- Perfect World (2018)
- AI Amok (2020)

=== Television ===
- Stand Up!! (2003)
- Dollhouse (ドールハウス) (2004)
- Kamen Rider Hibiki (2005)
- Broccoli (ブロッコリー) (2006)
- Tsubasa No Oreta Tenshitachi (2007)
- Swan no Baka (2007)
- Giragira (2008)
- Bloody Monday (ブラッディ・マンデイ) (2008)
- Saru Lock (2009)
- Untouchable (2009)
- Bloody Monday 2 (2010)
- Watashi wa Shadow (2011)
- Nobunaga no Chef (2013)
- Nobunaga no Chef 2 (2014)
- The Emperor's Cook (2015)
- Specialist (2016)
