= Kazunori Yokoo =

Japanese actor

Kazunori Yokoo (横尾和則, Yokoo Kazunori) is a Japanese actor.

== OVA ==
- Ultra Seven - Operation: Solar Energy (Eleking)
- Ultra Seven - The Ground of the Earthlings (Alien Metron)
- Ultra Seven - Lost Memory
- Ultra Seven - Glory and Legend

== Films ==
- 2003 - Ultraman Cosmos vs. Ultraman Justice: The Final Battle
- 2008 - Superior Ultraman 8 Brothers(King Gesura)

== TV ==
- 1999 - Booska! Booska!!(Booska)
- 2001 - Ultraman Cosmos
- 2006 - Bio Planet WoO(WoO)
- 2006 - Ultraman Mebius
- 2007 - Ultra Galaxy: Daikaijyu Battle(Gomora)
- 2008 - Ultra Galaxy Daikaijyu Battle: Never Ending Odyssey(Gomora)
