= Kenji Matsuda =

Japanese actor (born 1971)

- 松田 賢二
- Born: 23 September 1971 (age 54); Osaka, Japan
- Occupation: Actor
- Years active: 2000–present
- Known for: Versus
- Website: ameblo.jp/kenji-matsuda

Kenji Matsuda (松田 賢二, Matsuda Kenji; born September 23, 1971 in Osaka) is a Japanese actor. Matsuda began acting in high school when a girl he had a crush on convinced him to join the theatre club.

He later joined the sho-gekijo theatrical troupe Haiyu-Za. He is known for roles such as Kagero in the low-budget films Shinobi: The Law of Shinobi, 2002, and its sequels Shinobi: Runaway, 2005, Shinobi: Hidden Techniques, and Shinobi: A Way Out.

He is probably best known in Japan for numerous roles he has played in the tokusatsu genre: starting with Kamen Rider Hibiki as Zaoumaru Zaitsuhara/Kamen Rider Zanki and in Kamen Rider Touki in the movie special and in Kamen Rider Kiva as Jiro/Garulu. He did voice work in the Kamen Rider G special and had a recurring role in the series Garo: Makai Senki. He played the role of Raizo Gabi in Shuriken Sentai Ninninger.

He is perhaps most internationally known for his role as the butterfly knife-wielding yakuza in Ryuhei Kitamura's pop culture hit film, Versus.

He did voice-overs for the Wii video game Dragon Quest Swords as the hero's father, Baud. He also voiced the role of Zebra in the anime adaptation of the manga series Toriko.

Matsuda starred in the 2014 film A Courtesan with Flowered Skin.
