= Saikin Koi Shiteru? =

2009 video game for Nintendo DS

Saikin Koishiteru?
- Standard edition cover of Saikin Koishiteru?
- Developer: Microvision
- Publisher: D3 Publisher
- Platform: Nintendo DS
- Release: JP: July 30, 2009
- Genre: Otome game
- Mode: Single player

Saikin Koi Shiteru? is an otome game developed by MiCROViSiON Inc. and published by D3 Publisher for the Nintendo DS. It was released on July 30, 2009, in both standard and limited edition versions. Its CERO rating is B (12+), and its voice cast includes Motoko Kumai, Chiyako Shibahara, Megumi Toyoguchi, Kaori Nazuka, and Norio Wakamoto, among others.

== Characters/Cast ==
Sōhei Aiba (相羽壮平) - Miyu Irino
Takumi Shindō (新道拓海) - Yōji Ueda
Rei Kagami (加賀美怜) - Daisuke Namikawa
Ruka Kazama (風間瑠加) - Rakuto Tochihara

Yūsuke Saeki (佐伯雄介) - Kenjiro Tsuda
Miharu Sakurano (桜乃ミハル) - Ayahi Takagaki
Shin Akaigawa (赤井川慎) - Yuji Fujiwara
Wataru Mannami (万波亘) - Yūto Suzuki

== Books ==
- Saikin Koi Shiteru? Official Guidebook (サイキン恋シテル? 公式ガイドブック) September 30, 2009 ISBN 4047260398
