= Kamen Rider Hibiki =

- Also known as: Masked Rider Hibiki
- Genre: Tokusatsu; Superhero fiction Action; Supernatural; Fantasy; Musical
- Created by: Shotaro Ishinomori
- Written by: Tsuyoshi Kida; Toshiki Inoue
- Directed by: Hidenori Ishida
- Starring: Shigeki Hosokawa; Rakuto Tochihara; Mayu Gamō; Miyuki Kanbe; Erika Mori; Nana Akiyama; Jouji Shibue; Shingo Kawaguchi; Kenji Matsuda; Masako Umemiya; Yūichi Nakamura; Kaoru Mizuki; Mitsu Murata; Sei Ashina; Atomu Shimojō
- Opening theme: "Kagayaki" composed by Toshihiko Sahashi; "Hajimari no Kimi e" by Akira Fuse
- Ending theme: "Shōnen yo" by Akira Fuse
- Composer: Toshihiko Sahashi
- Country of origin: Japan
- No. of episodes: 48 (list of episodes)

Production
- Producers: Atsushi Kaji (TV Asahi); Shigenori Takatera (Toei); Shinichiro Shirakura (Toei); Masamichi Tsuchida (Toei)
- Running time: 20–25 minutes
- Production companies: Toei Company; Ishimori Productions; TV Asahi Corporation; Asatsu-DK

Original release
- Network: TV Asahi
- Release: January 30, 2005 – January 22, 2006

Related
- Kamen Rider Blade; Kamen Rider Kabuto

Kamen Rider Hibiki (仮面ライダー響鬼, Kamen Raidā Hibiki) is a Japanese tokusatsu superhero television series, serving as the 15th installment in the popular Kamen Rider Series of tokusatsu programs. It is a joint collaboration between Ishimori Productions and Toei. Kamen Rider Hibiki first aired on January 30, 2005 and aired its final episode on January 22, 2006. It aired as a part of TV Asahi's Super Hero Time along with Mahō Sentai Magiranger. It is the first series revolves around music, the natural world, and the balance between light and darkness. The series stands out for its focus on traditional Japanese aesthetics, as well as its more spiritual and introspective themes. The story follows Hibiki, a seasoned Kamen Rider, and his apprentice Asumu, as they battle the Makamou, monsters born from negative human emotions, and confront the personal and philosophical struggles of their role as protectors.

This series is noted for introducing new themes and styles yet unseen in other shows. The catchphrase for the series is: "To us, there are heroes." (ぼくたちには、ヒーローがいる, Bokutachi ni wa, hīrō ga iru). Kamen Rider Hibiki is the first Kamen Rider Series to be broadcast in a high-definition format.

== Plot ==
The Kamen Riders, known as Oni, battle man-eating beasts called Makamou with "pure sound". One of the Oni, a man named Hibiki, ends up having a "teacher-and-apprentice"-like relationship with Asumu Adachi, a young boy unsure of himself and is at a crossroads in his life as he transitions to high school. Asumu learns to be an adult through watching Hibiki and the other Oni as they all train together to hone their skills in fighting the Makamou and the homunculi aiding them. However, the sudden rise of Makamou numbers proves to be a prelude to an upcoming calamity.

== Characters ==
=== Takeshi ===
Takeshi (猛士) is a secret organization based in Yoshino, Nara, having been established two centuries ago as a partnership between the Oni and a select group of humans to defend Japan from the Makamou. In the present day, Takeshi has offices across Japan composed of Oni and a backup team that provided intelligence and support.

The combatant agents of Takeshi are known as Oni, who have long protected humans from the Makamou for centuries. The title of every Oni bears the -ki (鬼) suffix, which is semantically identical to "Oni" in Japanese language. It also has some resemblance with the real name of the Oni.

While transformed, each Oni wears an Equipment Belt (装備帯, Sōbi Tai), which carries one of three belt buckles that are compatible with their personal weapons for performing Ongeki (音撃) finishers; the Ongekikou (音撃鼓, Ongekikō) for percussion instrument-themed weapons, the Ongekimei (音撃鳴) for wind instrument-themed weapons, and the Ongekishin (音撃震) for string instrument-themed weapons.

Hibiki (ヒビキ)
Real name Hitoshi Hidaka (日高 仁志, Hidaka Hitoshi), he is among the most seasoned Oni with a strong sense of ethics and believes in constantly training oneself to keep up with their strength while being somewhat of a mentor figure. He takes Asumu under his wing, helping in any way that includes giving him needed advice.

Utilizing the Onkaku (音角) tuning fork, Hibiki can transform into Kamen Rider Hibiki. While transformed, he gains pyrokinesis, He also dual wields a pair of drumstick-like Ongekibou Rekka (音撃棒・烈火, Ongekibō Rekka) clubs. His personal vehicle is the Gaika (凱火) motorcycle. Over the course of the series, he gains access to evolutions of his Rider form, which are as follows:

- Kamen Rider Hibiki Kurenai (仮面ライダー響鬼紅, Kamen Raidā Hibiki Kurenai): Hibiki's super form achieved by completing his summer training that increases his pyrokinesis to its fullest potential.
- Kamen Rider Armed Hibiki (仮面ライダー仮面ライダー装甲(アームド)響鬼, Kamen Raidā Āmudo Hibiki): Hibiki's final form accessed from the Armed Saber (装甲声刃(アームドセイバー), Āmudo Seibā), which can switch between its short sword-like Kengeki Mode (剣撃モード, Kengeki Mōdo) and its microphone-like Ongeki Mode (音撃モード, Ongeki Mōdo), that grants sonokinesis.

Ibuki (イブキ)
Real name Iori Izumi (和泉 伊織, Izumi Iori), he is a composed member of an Oni family that oversee Takeshi's Yoshino headquarters and takes that position of protecting others and taking extremely dangerous missions with pride. But he gradually begins fearing death while realizing he was not as strong as he assumed himself to be, though he musters the courage to help Hibiki during the Orochi event.

Utilizing the Onteki (音笛) whistle, Ibuki can transform into Kamen Rider Ibuki (仮面ライダー威吹鬼, Kamen Raidā Ibuki). While transformed, he gains aerokinesis. He also wields the Ongekikan Reppu (音撃管・烈風, Ongekikan Reppū), which can switch between its handgun-like Jugeki Mode (銃撃モード, Jūgeki Mōdo) and its trumpet-like Ongeki Mode. His personal vehicle is the Tatsumaki (竜巻) motorcycle.

Akira Amami (天美 あきら, Amami Akira)
Ibuki's apprentice, who wanted to become an Oni out of revenge after her parents were killed by Makamou. While able to become an Oni, she eventually gives up her goal of being an Oni following her time with Shuki and resumes a normal life.

Todoroki (トドロキ)
Real name Tomizo Todayama (戸田山 登己蔵, Todayama Tomizō), he was originally an apprentice to Zanki who resolved to make a name for himself as the present-day Kamen Rider Todoroki (仮面ライダー轟鬼, Kamen Raidā Todoroki) rather than assume his master's title.

Utilizing the Onjou (音錠, Onjō) bracelet, Todoroki can transform into Kamen Rider Todoroki. While transformed, he gains electrokinesis. He also wields the Ongekigen Retsurai (音撃弦・烈雷), which can switch between its sword-like Kengeki Mode (剣撃モード, Kengeki Mōdo) and its guitar-like Ongeki Mode, that he inherited from his mentor after becoming an official Oni. His personal vehicle is the Raijin (雷神) SUV.

Zanki (ザンキ)
Real name Zaoumaru Zaitsuhara (財津原 蔵王丸, Zaitsuhara Zaōmaru), he is among the most seasoned of the Oni with Todoroki as his apprentice. Due to an injury he suffered from his mentor Shuki during his days as her apprentice, Zanki resolves to serve as Todoroki's support while his apprentice takes over his duties as an Oni. While he ended up dead when forced to transform again, he uses a forbidden spell Shuki taught him to remain among the living until Todoroki is able to stand on his own two feet.

Similarly to Todoroki, Zanki utilizes the Onka (音伽) bracelet to transform into Kamen Rider Zanki (仮面ライダー斬鬼, Kamen Raidā Zanki). While transformed, he gains electrokinesis. He also wields the Ongekishingen Retsuzan (音撃真弦・烈斬), which like the Ongekigen Retsurai can switch between Kengeki Mode and Ongeki Mode.

Ichiro Tachibana (立花 勢地郎, Tachibana Ichirō)
The current head official of Takeshi's Kantō branch and father of the Tachibana sisters, a cheerful man who gives the Oni under him thoughtful advice while sending them out on their missions while having a personal library where he researches the Makamou.

Kasumi Tachibana (立花 香須実, Tachibana Kasumi)
The eldest Tachibana sister, a very intelligent individual who usually acts as a field support by providing the Oni supplies and extra Disk Animals (ディスクアニマル, Disuku Animaru).

Hinaka Tachibana (立花 日菜佳, Tachibana Hinaka)
The youngest Tachibana sister, a cheerful girl who usually hangs around Takeshi Headquarters to track the Makamou and rarely goes out into the field.

Midori Takizawa (滝澤 みどり, Takizawa Midori)
Takeshi's equipment and weapons designer who is responsible for creating the Oni's sound weapons and the Disk Animals. She is also an old friend of Hitoshi, who has been friends since childhood and joined Takeshi to aid him once he became the current Hibiki.

Konosuke Kogure (小暮 耕之助, Kogure Kōnosuke)
The head of Takeshi's weapon design section and Midori's mentor, a former Oni who is said to have defeated twenty Makamou single-handedly. He is also a singer in his spare time. Much of Takeshi, including Ichiro, fears him because of his strict disciplinary personality (with the exception of a few people). When he is angered, he chases his "victim" and hits them with a paddle. He also travels using a motorcycle with the newly improved Armed Saber which he made and was almost too powerful for any Oni to control, causing them to lose their transformation abilities for a month. When Torodoki and Hibiki were affected by the Armed Saber, Konosuke trained the two with his special training to improve their powers. The training, utilizing energy from the gut while singing, paid off for Hibiki because it enabled him to wield the Armed Saber. After that, Konosuke left for Yoshino.

=== Others ===
Asumu Adachi (安達 明日夢, Adachi Asumu)
A high school student who Hibiki took under his wing for advice and decides to become his apprentice before resolving to live a normal life and support Hibiki instead.

Hitomi Mochida (持田 ひとみ, Mochida Hitomi)
Asumu's classmate and Todoroki's cousin.

Kyosuke Kiriya (桐矢 京介, Kiriya Kyōsuke)
A high school student who becomes Asumu's rival after becoming an apprentice to Hibiki. After Asumu stepped down from becoming an Oni, Kyosuke became both Hibiki's only apprentice and a full-fledged Oni a year after the events of Orochi.

Ikuko Adachi (安達 郁子, Adachi Ikuko)
Asumu's mother who works as a taxi driver.

Shuki (シュキ)
Real name Shiori Shinagawa (品川 栞, Shinagawa Shiori), she is a former Oni with a knowledge of Oni lore who uses ancient Oni techniques that include the Firebird shikigami and means to appear in her early 30s. Unlike the other Oni who fight the Makamou to protect humans, Shuki's motivation was to track down and kill the Makamou Notsugo after it slaughtered her family years ago. Because of her personal vendetta, and inflicting her former apprentice Zanki with a crippling injury when her chance to kill Notsugo presented itself, Shuki was stripped of her Oni title as she was being gradually consumed by her Oni power. Shuki resurfaced years later in a suit of Oni Armor (鬼の鎧, Oni no Yoroi) before stealing Todoroki's Onjo to resume her form as Kamen Rider Shuki (仮面ライダー朱鬼, Kamen Raidā Shuki), taking Akira as her apprentice due to their similarities. Shuki succeeds in exacting her revenge on Natsugo by sacrificing herself so Zanki can kill it, and Shuki requesting Zanki to bury her under flowers to conceal her true face.
Among making many changes to the Kamen Rider look, Kamen Rider Hibiki introduced Kamen Rider Shuki, the third officially recognized female Heisei Kamen Rider in a Kamen Rider series after Kamen Rider Femme from Kamen Rider Ryuki and Kamen Rider Larc from Kamen Rider Blade.

=== Douji and Hime ===
The term used for a pair of homunculi servants that aid a Makamou, revealed to be clones created by a couple known as the "Man and Woman of the Western-Style House" (洋館の男女, Yōkan no Danjo), who are the antagonists of most of the series despite preferring to act from behind the scenes. It is assumed they were humans who achieved a means of immortality long ago and have been modifying the Makamou to wipe out the Oni and destroy humanity. The Douji (童子, Dōji) are the clones of the Man while the Hime (姫) are clones of the Woman, the Parent clones who care for the Makamou having swapped voices and the ability to transform into humanoid versions of their "children". The Parents are created by Kugutsu (クグツ) clones, the ones in black trench coats creating the Giant-Type Makamou Parents with the black Kugutsu Hime providing them with armor modification, while the ones in white robes create the Summer-Type Makamou Parents. The Kugutsu were executed by Super Douji and Super Hime. Eventually, the Man and Woman are forced into a ceasefire with the Oni as the Makamou were becoming too uncontrollable during the Orochi Phenomenon. A year after the Orochi Phenomenon was stopped, they created the Makamou Satori to abduct an ideal human (Hitomi) so they can use her to create more stable clones. At the end of the series, they are revealed to be the clones of the "Mysterious Man and Woman" (謎の男女, Nazo no Danjo), who still need them to carry on their work.

Super Douji (スーパー童子, Sūpā Dōji) and Super Hime (スーパー姫, Sūpā Hime)
The "perfected" version of the Douji and Hime clones that replace the obsolete clones in supporting Makamou, originally childish in personality before they "matured" into homicidal psychopaths wanting to taste Oni blood. But they need to eat a special "armor orb" at a regular basis to prolong their lives. During the Orochi Phenomenon, the clones started to develop a sense of self as they begin, with Super Hime starting to question their existence and their creators' intent, to Super Douji's annoyance. After being told to protect the Oni, they attempted a rebellion against their creators' will which resulted in them dying from losing the method that prolonged their short lives.

=== Makamou ===
The regular antagonists of the series; the Makamou (魔化魍, Makamō) are an assortment of monstrous creatures that usually dwell in the rural areas and consume human beings as food. Chimerical in appearance with their size and shape depending on the environment they are born in, and serving as the basis of the yōkai myths, the Makamou are a naturally created phenomena though some have been modified by the Man and Woman to be stronger and unpredictable. But the Makamou can destabilize and explode when exposed to pure sound produced by the Oni's attacks.

In the final arc, a chain of events called the Orochi Phenomenon (オロチ現象, Orochi Genshō) occurs. Marked by the appearance of Kodama's Forest, every known Makamou appears at the same time, increasing in massive numbers to the point where not even the Man and Woman can control them. By the climax, the Makamou start to dissolve into a purple miasma and killing by the hundreds. Hibiki eventually stopped Orochi by performing the sealing ritual, dealing with a massive army of Makamou bent on stopping him from ending their era before it could begin. In the end, the Orochi was halted and Makamou numbers dwindled back to normal.

==== Giant-Type Makamo ====
The Giant-Type Makamou are the most common type of Makamou, essentially daikaiju with heights that vary from 22 ft. to 75 ft. Makamou that fall under this listing include Tsuchigumo (ツチグモ) and Bakegani (バケガニ).

==== Summer-Type Makamou ====
The Summer-Type Makamou are human-sized Makamou that normally appear during the summer, apparently starting the Japanese legend of ghosts and yōkai appearing on Earth during the summer. While the Summer-Type Makamou lack in size, they make it up in their ability to replicate themselves in large numbers and when one is destroyed they can easily be replaced. The key to destroying them is to destroy the original so no more replicates can be created. The Ongekida finishers are the most efficient way of destroying them.

==== Experimental Type Makamou ====
The Experimental-Type Makamou are Makamou developed by the Man and Woman to suppress the other two types, modified to be resistant to Oni attacks after the Man and Woman analyzed the Armed Saber.

==== Kodama ====
The Kodama (コダマ) is a tree-like Makamou whose appearance marks the beginning of an Orochi event, able to trap its victims within a forest it spawns. Todoroki was dispatched to investigate, only to be ambushed by a wooden puppet Kodama created. The puppet managed to overpower Armed Hibiki and drive the Oni out of its forest. The Kodama later reappeared, trapping Ibuki and Kasumi, whom the monster intended to eat. While Ibuki and Todoroki battle the medium, Asumu and Kyosuke find Kodama and manage to free Kasumi from it, the medium feeling its master's pain before being quickly destroyed by Ibuki while Kodama is destroyed by Armed Hibiki.

== Development ==
The Kamen Rider Hibiki trademark was registered by Toei on October 21, 2004.

Kamen Rider Hibiki began with Shigenori Takatera as the Toei producer, however, Shinichiro Shirakura, who though having participated in other Heisei Kamen Rider series, had no involvement whatsoever in the Hibiki production, was appointed producer of the film Kamen Rider Hibiki & the Seven Senki, eventually replacing Takatera in the TV production from episode 30. The writing staff also changed; Tsuyoshi Kida and Shinji Ōishi were replaced by Toshiki Inoue and Shōji Yonemura, who had worked with Shirakura on Sh15uya and other Heisei Kamen Rider series.

In addition, personalities such as Sensha Yoshida, a renowned manga artist; Hiroshi Yamamoto, a video game designer; Masao Higashi, a seasoned television and movie critic; and many others published severe criticisms in their personal blogs because of this. Even the show's star, Shigeki Hosokawa, who portrayed Hibiki, stated in his personal website that Inoue's scripts "needed adjustments" and that this whole staff change was "fraudulent". With the first production staff, Hosokawa would join the writers' meetings and give suggestions, however Hosokawa could not give his opinion in the second production staff meetings due to time restraints.

In an interview published on TV Asahi's main website, Hosokawa stated that the script for the final episode was rewritten on the final day of filming. He later said that the script was sent in so late that it arrived on set as the final battle was being filmed. This finale was scrapped and then a new ending that, according to Hosokawa, was nothing like the intended ending, was filmed. Later in the interview, Hosokawa said that the Oni suit used by Kyosuke was a kitbash of two new suits made especially for the characters of Asumu and Kyosuke. Hosokawa said that this was the most upsetting change to him as the final script had been rewritten six times at that point and all but the filmed version contained both Asumu and Kyosuke becoming Oni.

In January 2006, at the Kamen Rider Super Live, Hosokawa stated that the series was "essentially an incomplete process" and that "it should not have ended that way". Mitsu Murata, who portrayed the Douji characters, declared on his blog: "I cannot forgive them, I want to continue his idea", complaining about the removal of Takatera as producer. These declarations caused an unprecedented storm within the professional tokusatsu market and many of Toei's executives were berated for allowing a series to be handled in such a manner.

There has never been any official statement from Toei, but many critics point out several facts might have caused it, the main reason being the low toy sales. It is not usual for a Toei production to have two different producers for the TV series and the movie. It is likely that a different producer was appointed for the movie because Toei was suffering from schedule problems with Takatera.

Changes

- Asumu's opening narration at the start of every episode was removed starting with episode 30.
- A new opening was introduced in episode 34 and following.
- The use of kanji being flashed on screen during scenes was removed altogether by episode 30.
- The ending sequence was removed altogether.
- The characters of Kyosuke Kiriya and Shuki were introduced to the series.
- Originally Eiki and Shouki were both supposed to be the main cast members, but had their parts completely removed.
- The fire-breathing (Onibi) and the clawed Oni (Onizume) abilities' sequences were completely removed along with Ibuki opening his mouth for his attack. The Makamou that opened their mouths too wide or spurted liquids were also removed. There had been complaints about these sequences from parent advocacy groups who claimed that they scared children.
- Things as complicated-to-animate CG Makamou and shooting in mountains were almost entirely reduced probably due to cost issues, leading critics to believe that Takatera was forcefully removed from the project due to his unwillingness to change his script to adapt to these changes.

== Episodes ==
No.	Title	Directed by	Written by	Original release date
1	"The Echoing Oni"; Transliteration: "Hibiku Oni" (Japanese: 響く鬼)	Hidenori Ishida	Tsuyoshi Kida; Shinji Ōishi	January 30, 2005
2	"The Roaring Spider"; Transliteration: "Hoeru Kumo" (Japanese: 咆える蜘蛛)	Hidenori Ishida	Tsuyoshi Kida; Shinji Ōishi	February 6, 2005
3	"Falling Voice"; Transliteration: "Ochiru Koe" (Japanese: 落ちる声)	Satoshi Morota	Tsuyoshi Kida; Shinji Ōishi	February 13, 2005
4	"Running Ichiro"; Transliteration: "Kakeru Ichirō" (Japanese: 駆ける勢地郎)	Satoshi Morota	Tsuyoshi Kida; Shinji Ōishi	February 20, 2005
5	"Melting Sea"; Transliteration: "Tokeru Umi" (Japanese: 熔ける海)	Taro Sakamoto	Tsuyoshi Kida; Shinji Ōishi	February 27, 2005
6	"Beating Soul"; Transliteration: "Tataku Tamashii" (Japanese: 叩く魂)	Taro Sakamoto	Tsuyoshi Kida; Shinji Ōishi	March 6, 2005
7	"The Blowing Oni"; Transliteration: "Ibuku Oni" (Japanese: 息吹く鬼)	Hidenori Ishida	Tsuyoshi Kida; Shinji Ōishi	March 13, 2005
8	"Screaming Wind"; Transliteration: "Sakebu Kaze" (Japanese: 叫ぶ風)	Hidenori Ishida	Tsuyoshi Kida; Shinji Ōishi	March 20, 2005
9	"Wriggling Evil Heart"; Transliteration: "Ugomeku Jashin" (Japanese: 蠢く邪心)	Satoshi Morota	Tsuyoshi Kida; Shinji Ōishi	March 27, 2005
10	"The Oni Standing in a Line"; Transliteration: "Narabitatsu Oni" (Japanese: 並び立つ鬼)	Satoshi Morota	Tsuyoshi Kida; Shinji Ōishi	April 3, 2005
11	"Swallowing Wall"; Transliteration: "Nomikomu Kabe" (Japanese: 呑み込む壁)	Taro Sakamoto	Tsuyoshi Kida	April 10, 2005
12	"Revealed Secrets"; Transliteration: "Hiraku Himitsu" (Japanese: 開く秘密)	Taro Sakamoto	Shinji Ōishi	April 17, 2005
13	"Berserk Fate"; Transliteration: "Midareru Sadame" (Japanese: 乱れる運命(さだめ))	Osamu Kaneda	Shinji Ōishi	April 24, 2005
14	"Devouring Douji"; Transliteration: "Kurau Dōji" (Japanese: 喰らう童子)	Osamu Kaneda	Shinji Ōishi	May 1, 2005
15	"Weakening Thunder"; Transliteration: "Niburu Ikazuchi" (Japanese: 鈍る雷)	Hidenori Ishida	Shinji Ōishi	May 8, 2005
16	"The Roaring Oni"; Transliteration: "Todoroku Oni" (Japanese: 轟く鬼)	Hidenori Ishida	Shinji Ōishi	May 15, 2005
17	"A Targeted Town"; Transliteration: "Nerawareru Machi" (Japanese: 狙われる街)	Satoshi Morota	Shinji Ōishi	May 22, 2005
18	"Unbroken Hurricane"; Transliteration: "Kujikenu Shippū" (Japanese: 挫けぬ疾風)	Satoshi Morota	Shinji Ōishi	May 29, 2005
19	"Strumming Warrior"; Transliteration: "Kakinarasu Senshi" (Japanese: かき鳴らす戦士)	Masataka Takamaru	Tsuyoshi Kida	June 5, 2005
20	"The Pure Sound"; Transliteration: "Kiyomeru Oto" (Japanese: 清める音)	Masataka Takamaru	Tsuyoshi Kida	June 12, 2005
21	"Demons Drawn Together"; Transliteration: "Hikiau Mamono" (Japanese: 引き合う魔物)	Hidenori Ishida	Tsuyoshi Kida	June 26, 2005
22	"Changing into a Cocoon"; Transliteration: "Bakeru Mayu" (Japanese: 化ける繭)	Hidenori Ishida	Tsuyoshi Kida	July 3, 2005
23	"Summer of Training"; Transliteration: "Kitaeru Natsu" (Japanese: 鍛える夏)	Satoshi Morota	Shinji Ōishi	July 10, 2005
24	"Burning Crimson"; Transliteration: "Moeru Kurenai" (Japanese: 燃える紅)	Satoshi Morota	Shinji Ōishi	July 17, 2005
25	"Running Azure"; Transliteration: "Hashiru Konpeki" (Japanese: 走る紺碧)	Masataka Takamaru	Shinji Ōishi	July 24, 2005
26	"Counting the Days"; Transliteration: "Kizamareru Hibi" (Japanese: 刻まれる日々)	Hidenori Ishida	Shinji Ōishi	August 7, 2005
27	"Passing Down the Bond"; Transliteration: "Tsutaeru Kizuna" (Japanese: 伝える絆)	Hidenori Ishida	Shinji Ōishi	August 14, 2005
28	"Unending Malice"; Transliteration: "Taenu Akui" (Japanese: 絶えぬ悪意)	Osamu Kaneda	Shinji Ōishi	August 21, 2005
29	"Shining Boy"; Transliteration: "Kagayaku Shōnen" (Japanese: 輝く少年)	Osamu Kaneda	Shinji Ōishi	August 28, 2005
30	"Premonition of Training"; Transliteration: "Kitaeru Yokan" (Japanese: 鍛える予感)	Satoshi Morota	Toshiki Inoue	September 4, 2005
31	"Surpassing Father"; Transliteration: "Koeru Chichi" (Japanese: 超える父)	Satoshi Morota	Toshiki Inoue	September 11, 2005
32	"Bursting Song"; Transliteration: "Hajikeru Uta" (Japanese: 弾ける歌)	Masataka Takamaru	Toshiki Inoue	September 18, 2005
33	"The Armed Blade"; Transliteration: "Matō Yaiba" (Japanese: 装甲(まと)う刃)	Masataka Takamaru	Toshiki Inoue	September 25, 2005
34	"Beloved Bonito"; Transliteration: "Koi Suru Katsuo" (Japanese: 恋する鰹)	Hidenori Ishida	Toshiki Inoue	October 2, 2005
35	"Confusing Angel"; Transliteration: "Madowasu Tenshi" (Japanese: 惑わす天使)	Hidenori Ishida	Toshiki Inoue	October 9, 2005
36	"Starving Shuki"; Transliteration: "Ueru Shuki" (Japanese: 飢える朱鬼)	Taro Sakamoto	Toshiki Inoue	October 16, 2005
37	"Revived Lightning"; Transliteration: "Yomigaeru Ikazuchi" (Japanese: 甦る雷)	Taro Sakamoto	Toshiki Inoue	October 23, 2005
38	"Broken Ongeki"; Transliteration: "Yabureru Ongeki" (Japanese: 敗れる音撃)	Naoki Tamura	Shōji Yonemura	October 30, 2005
39	"Your Beginning"; Transliteration: "Hajimaru Kimi" (Japanese: 始まる君)	Naoki Tamura	Shōji Yonemura	November 13, 2005
40	"Nearing Orochi"; Transliteration: "Semaru Orochi" (Japanese: 迫るオロチ)	Osamu Kaneda	Toshiki Inoue	November 20, 2005
41	"The Awakening Teacher and Student"; Transliteration: "Mezameru Shitei" (Japanese: 目醒める師弟)	Osamu Kaneda	Toshiki Inoue	November 27, 2005
42	"Ferocious Demons"; Transliteration: "Takeru Yōma" (Japanese: 猛る妖魔)	Taro Sakamoto	Toshiki Inoue	December 4, 2005
43	"An Unchangeable Body"; Transliteration: "Kawarenu Karada" (Japanese: 変われぬ身(からだ))	Taro Sakamoto	Toshiki Inoue	December 11, 2005
44	"Forbidden Secret"; Transliteration: "Himeru Kindan" (Japanese: 秘める禁断)	Nobuhiro Suzumura	Toshiki Inoue	December 18, 2005
45	"Dying a Glorious Death, Zanki"; Transliteration: "Sange Suru Zanki" (Japanese: 散華する斬鬼)	Nobuhiro Suzumura	Toshiki Inoue	December 25, 2005
46	"Mastering the Oni Way"; Transliteration: "Kiwameru Onidō" (Japanese: 極める鬼道)	Taro Sakamoto	Toshiki Inoue	January 8, 2006
47	"The Talking Back"; Transliteration: "Kataru Senaka" (Japanese: 語る背中)	Taro Sakamoto	Toshiki Inoue	January 15, 2006
48 (Final)	"Dreaming of Tomorrow"; Transliteration: "Asunaru Yume" (Japanese: 明日なる夢)	Taro Sakamoto	Toshiki Inoue	January 22, 2006

== Film ==
The movie spin-off of the 2005 Kamen Rider series, entitled Kamen Rider Hibiki & The Seven Senki the Movie (劇場版 仮面ライダー響鬼と7人の戦鬼, Gekijōban Kamen Raidā Hibiki to Shichinin no Senki) was released on September 3, double-billed with Mahō Sentai Magiranger the Movie: Bride of Infershia. The film takes place in the Warring States Period, serves as a prequel to the Makamou war, and features five movie-only Oni known as Kabuki, Kirameki, Habataki, Nishiki, and Touki.

== Hyper Battle DVD ==
In Kamen Rider Hibiki: Asumu Transform! You Can Be an Oni, too!! (仮面ライダー響鬼 明日夢変身！キミも鬼になれる！！, Kamen Raidā Hibiki Asumu Henshin! Kimi mo Oni ni Nareru!!), Asumu Adachi imagines if he could be like Kamen Rider Hibiki, and is approached by talking Disk Animals who teach him how to be like Hibiki, eventually allowing Asumu to transform into Kamen Rider Armed Hibiki. Kamen Rider Sabaki (仮面ライダー裁鬼, Kamen Raidā Sabaki) also appears in the DVD.

== Novels ==
- Kamen Rider Hibiki: Compass to Tomorrow (仮面ライダー響鬼 明日への指針(コンパス), Kamen Raidā Hibiki Asu e no Konpasu), written by Osamu Inamoto, is a novelization of episodes 1-6. The novel followed relatively the same plot as the TV series but added new characters and enemies towards the end of its run. The novel was released in July 2005.
- Novel: Kamen Rider Hibiki (小説 仮面ライダー響鬼, Shōsetsu Kamen Raidā Hibiki), written by Tsuyoshi Kida, is part of a series of spin-off novel adaptions of the Heisei Era Kamen Riders. The novel was released on May 23, 2013.

== Video game ==
Kamen Rider Hibiki was released by Bandai for the PlayStation 2 on December 1, 2005. It featured a unique cross compatibility with the Taiko no Tatsujin Tatacon controller, where the taiko-like controller could be used in the rhythm game-like sections of Hibiki. It was also released alongside a special edition of the Taiko no Tatsujin series which included the theme songs of the Kamen Rider Hibiki TV show ("Kagayaki" and "Shōnen yo"). A release for the GameCube was planned, but ultimately scrapped.

== Manga ==
The S.I.C. Hero Saga side story for Hibiki is titled Masked Rider Hibiki: Seven Ogres (MASKED RIDER HIBIKI -SEVEN OGRES-), which is an alternate telling of the film Hibiki & The Seven Senki. It features the original character Kamen Rider Armed Hibiki (Sengoku Period ver.) (仮面ライダー装甲響鬼（戦国時代ver.）, Kamen Raidā Āmudo Hibiki (Sengoku Jidai ver.)). The Seven Ogres storyline ran in the June through September 2006 issues of Monthly Hobby Japan magazine.

Chapter titles

1. Takeshi (猛士)
2. Kabuki (歌舞鬼)
3. Kurenai (紅)
4. Orochi (オロチ)

== Cast ==
- Hibiki: Shigeki Hosokawa (細川 茂樹, Hosokawa Shigeki)
- Asumu Adachi: Rakuto Tochihara (栩原 楽人, Tochihara Rakuto)
- Kasumi Tachibana: Mayu Gamō (蒲生 麻由, Gamō Mayu)
- Hinaka Tachibana: Miyuki Kanbe (神戸 みゆき, Kanbe Miyuki)
- Hitomi Mochida: Erika Mori (森 絵梨佳, Mori Erika)
- Akira Amami: Nana Akiyama (秋山 奈々, Akiyama Nana)
- Ibuki: Jouji Shibue (渋江 譲二, Shibue Jōji)
- Todoroki: Shingo Kawaguchi (川口 真五, Kawaguchi Shingo)
- Zanki: Kenji Matsuda (松田 賢二, Matsuda Kenji)
- Midori Takizawa: Masako Umemiya (梅宮 万紗子, Umemiya Masako)
- Kyosuke Kiriya: Yūichi Nakamura (中村 優一, Nakamura Yūichi)
- Ikuko Adachi: Kaoru Mizuki (水木 薫, Mizuki Kaoru)
- Douji, Kugutsu, Man of the Western-Style House, Mysterious Man, Parent Douji: Mitsu Murata (村田 充, Murata Mitsu)
- Hime, Kugutsu, Woman of the Western-Style House, Mysterious Woman, Parent Hime: Sei Ashina (芦名 星, Ashina Sei)
- Ichiro Tachibana: Atomu Shimojō (下條 アトム, Shimojō Atomu)
- Next Preview Narration: Kazuya Nakai (中井 和哉, Nakai Kazuya)
- Junction Narration: Kōji Nakata (中田 浩二, Nakata Kōji)

=== Voice actors ===
- Parent Douji: Sei Ashina
- Parent Hime: Mitsu Murata

=== Guest actors ===
- Mr. Isakura (伊佐倉先生, Isakura-sensei; 13–14, 17, 30, 46): Nobuyuki Yoneyama (米山 信之, Yoneyama Nobuyuki)
- Konosuke Kogure (32–33): Akira Fuse (布施 明, Fuse Akira)
- Shuki (36–37): Reiko Kataoka (片岡 礼子, Kataoka Reiko)

== International broadcast ==
- In the Philippines, it was aired on TV5 with a Tagalog dub as Masked Rider Hibiki from 2009 to 2010.

== Songs ==
Opening themes

- "Kagayaki" (輝; "Radiance")
  - Composition & Arrangement: Toshihiko Sahashi
  - Episodes: 1–33, 48
- "Hajimari no Kimi e" (始まりの君へ; "To the Original You")
  - Lyrics: Shoko Fujibayashi
  - Composition & Arrangement: Toshihiko Sahashi
  - Artist: Akira Fuse
  - Episodes: 34–47

Ending theme

- "Shōnen yo" (少年よ; "Boy!")
  - Lyrics: Shoko Fujibayashi
  - Composition & Arrangement: Toshihiko Sahashi
  - Artist: Akira Fuse
  - Episodes: 1–33, 48
