= Toku (TV channel) =

American pay television channel and streaming service

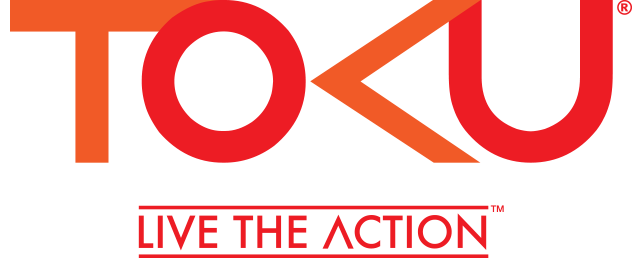
- Country: United States
- Broadcast area: North America
- Headquarters: West Palm Beach, Florida

Programming
- Languages: English; Spanish (via SAP audio track)
- Picture format: 1080i HDTV (downscaled to letterboxed 480i for the SDTV feed)

Ownership
- Owner: Olympusat

History
- Launched: January 1, 2016; 10 years ago
- Replaced: Funimation Channel

Links
- Website: www.olympusat.com/networks/toku/

Toku is an American pay television channel and streaming service owned by Olympusat and broadcasts anime and East Asian programming.

It was launched on January 1, 2016, replacing Funimation Channel, after Funimation ended their partnership with Olympusat. Tristan Leostar is the content aggregator for the channel.

== History ==
=== As Funimation Channel ===
Logo as Funimation Channel

Funimation Channel started as a syndicated block on Colours TV, one of Olympusat's affiliate networks. Programs during this era were Dragon Ball, Negima!, Kodocha, The Slayers, Blue Gender, Kiddy Grade, Fruits Basket, Case Closed and YuYu Hakusho. The block was later discontinued in favor of a more successful expansion on subscription television.

The Funimation Channel launched on September 29, 2005, as a joint venture between Funimation and Olympusat, it became the second 24-hour anime digital cable network in North America, following A.D. Vision's Anime Network. Olympusat was the exclusive distributor of the channel.

On May 1, 2008, Funimation Channel became a 24-hour English-dubbed anime subscription network; the second following Anime Network in North America. Olympusat was chosen as the exclusive distributor of Funimation Channel. The service was originally available to a few cities via digital terrestrial television and was initially a temporary channel as the channel was trying to gain a foothold in the pay television landscape.

In May 2009, Funimation Channel continued its expansion on subscription providers launching on Comcast's VOD platform and offering two services, free on demand and PPV on demand. The PPV VOD offered viewers a chance to watch titles prior to their DVD release.

On September 27, 2010, Funimation launched an HD feed alongside its VOD services. On February 16, 2012, Verizon announced that it would remove Funimation Channel from its Verizon Fios service on March 15, due to "very low viewership". In response to reaction from its customers, Verizon returned Funimation Channel via VOD. Channel 262 remained on the FiOS system operated by Frontier Communications in some formerly distributed Verizon territories. With the launch of Cablevision's Optimum TV service in December 2012, Funimation Channel on Demand was included and launched in the New York metropolitan area, this increased Funimation Channel's coverage to over 40 million households nationwide.

Funimation Channel's programming came from Funimation, Aniplex of America, Viz Media, Sentai Filmworks, Right Stuf Inc., NIS America, Central Park Media and Enoki Films USA.

=== As Toku ===
On December 8, 2015, it was reported that the channel would relaunch as Toku on December 31, 2015, and would start broadcasting live-action, grindhouse and independent East Asian movies. It was subsequently announced, on December 15, 2015, that Funimation would end its partnership with Olympusat, and initially announced plans to relaunch Funimation Channel in 2016, but instead launched a steaming service at the same time.

On March 14, 2016, Olympusat announced a localized version of Toku in Latin America, named Toku Español. However, the channel never launched in the region.

On July 25, 2016, it was announced that Toku would be launched in the FlixFling streaming service in early 2017, but these plans were canceled. On June 8, 2017, Toku became available on Amazon Channels as a streaming service for members of Amazon Prime, offering channel content on demand for US$4.00 per month, after a seven-day free trial.

On August 23, 2017, Consolidated Communications added Toku on its channel line-up.

On May 22, 2018, Toku launched a beta version of its streaming service WatchTOKU.com for the United States and Canada, which includes channel content and future releases, as well as embedded forums. The service, powered by Vimeo, costs either US$4.00 per month or US$40.00 per year. This marked Toku's debut outside the United States, being available for the first time in Canada. The streaming service was discontinued in 2022.

Toku's programming comes from Media Blasters, Discotek Media, Tsuburaya Productions, MonoFilm Sales and other anime and movie licensors.

== Availability ==
The linear channel is available on U-verse TV, Claro Puerto Rico, Hotwire Communications, Fidium Fiber, Sjobergs Inc., IFiber Communications and OptiLink; its HD feed has been available since the network's launch in 2015. The linear channel was previously available on Verizon Fios as Funimation Channel until 2012.

The VOD service is available on Optimum, Xfinity, Vubiquity, Frontier FiOS and Armstrong. The VOD service was previously available on Charter Communications and Massilion.

The channel is available in streaming through its WatchToku.com streaming service, as well as its Amazon Prime Video channel. It was formerly available on Go90.

== Programming ==
=== Anime series ===
==== Current ====
- Girl's High
- Gakuen Heaven: Boy's Love Hyper
- Green Green
- Jubei Chan: Secret of the Lovely Eyepatch
- Juden Chan
- Ladies versus Butlers!
- Night Head Genesis
- Princess Princess
- Ramen Fighter Miki
- Rio: Rainbow Gate!
- Strawberry Panic!
- Super Robot Wars Original Generation: Divine Wars
- Yosuga no Sora
- Saber Rider and the Star Sheriffs
- Yamibou
- After School Midnighters (short series)
- Darkness Boy Santa
- Kowabon
- Cheer or Sneer, Mr. Deer?
- World War Blue
- Queen's Blade: Wandering Warrior
- The Ultraman

==== Upcoming ====
- Ikki Tousen: Dragon Destiny
- Genshiken
- Dōjin Work
- Kujibiki Heart

==== Former ====
- .hack//Quantum
- A Certain Magical Index
- A Certain Scientific Railgun
- Aesthetica of a Rogue Hero
- Appleseed XIII
- Aquarion
- Aquarion Evol
- Aria the Scarlet Ammo
- B Gata H Kei
- Baccano!
- Baka and Test
- Baki the Grappler
- Bamboo Blade
- Basilisk
- BECK: Mongolian Chop Squad
- Ben-To
- Big Windup!
- Black Blood Brothers
- Black Butler
- Black Cat
- Black Lagoon
- Blassreiter
- Blood-C
- Blue Gender
- Boogiepop Phantom
- Burst Angel
- Buso Renkin
- C
- Case Closed
- Casshern Sins
- Cat Planet Cuties
- Chaos;Head
- Chobits
- Chrome Shelled Regios
- Claymore
- Code: Breaker
- Corpse Princess
- D.Gray-man
- D-Frag!
- Danganronpa
- Darker Than Black
- Deadman Wonderland
- Devil May Cry
- Dragon Age
- Dragon Ball
- Dragonaut: The Resonance
- Eden of the East
- El Cazador de la Bruja
- Ergo Proxy
- Eureka Seven
- Eureka Seven: AO
- Fafner in the Azure
- Fairy Tail
- Fractale
- Freezing
- Fruits Basket
- Full Metal Panic!
- Full Metal Panic? Fumoffu
- Future Diary
- Ga-Rei-Zero
- Galaxy Railways
- Gankutsuou: The Count of Monte Cristo
- Good Luck Girl!
- Gungrave
- Gunslinger Girl
- Haganai
- Haré+Guu
- Heaven's Lost Property
- Hero Tales
- Heroic Age
- Hetalia
- High School DxD
- His and Her Circumstances
- Honey and Clover
- Hunter × Hunter (1999)
- Hyperdimension Neptunia
- Ikki Tousen
- Is This a Zombie?
- Jormungand
- Jyu-Oh-Sei
- Kamisama Kiss
- Karneval
- Kaze no Stigma
- Kenichi: The Mightiest Disciple
- Kiddy Grade
- Kodocha
- Lucky Star
- Last Exile
  - Last Exile: Fam, the Silver Wing
- Level E
- Linebarrels of Iron
- Maken-ki!
- Michiko and Hatchin
- Monster
- MoonPhase
- Mushishi
- My Bride Is a Mermaid
- Nabari no Ou
- Nana
- Negima!
- Ninja Nonsense
- Oh! Edo Rocket
- Ōkami-san to Shichinin no Nakamatachi
- Ouran High School Host Club
- Pandalian (February 5, 2007 – January 11, 2009)
- Peach Girl
- Phantom: Requiem for the Phantom
- Ping Pong
- Princess Jellyfish
- Revolutionary Girl Utena
- RideBack
- Robotics;Notes
- Samurai 7
- Samurai Champloo
- Sankarea
- Sasami: Magical Girls Club
- School Rumble
- Sekirei
- Sengoku Basara: Samurai Kings
- Serial Experiments Lain
- Shakugan no Shana
- Shangri-La
- Shigurui: Death Frenzy
- Shiki
- Shingu: Secret of the Stellar Wars
- Slayers
  - Slayers Evolution-R
  - Slayers Next
  - Slayers Revolution
  - Slayers Try
- Solty Rei
- Soul Eater
- Spice and Wolf
- Spiral: The Bonds of Reasoning
- Suzuka
- Tenchi Muyo! GXP
- Tenchi Muyo! War on Geminar
- Tetsuwan Birdy: Decode
- The Guyver: Bio-Booster Armor
- The Legend of the Legendary Heroes
- The Sacred Blacksmith
- To
- Trinity Blood
- Tsubasa: Reservoir Chronicle
- Witchblade
- xxxHolic
- Yu Yu Hakusho

=== Live-action drama series ===
- Shinobi Girl
- TOKU Talk
- Ultraman Max
- Ultraman 80
- Ultraman Neos
- Ultraman Nexus
- Ultraseven X
- Flesh for the Beast: Tsukiko's Curse
- The Shaolin Warriors
- Neo Ultra Q
- Project X
- Ultra Galaxy Mega Monster Battle
- Ultraman Zero: The Chronicle
- Guardian
- Ultra Galaxy Mega Monster Battle: Never Ending Odyssey
- Angels
- The Legendary Outlaw
- Ultraman Leo
- Hot Girl
- Gridman the Hyper Agent
- Ultraman Ginga
- Ultraman Gaia
- Ultraman Ginga S
- Samurai Cat
- Ultraman Mebius
- Amazing Detective Di Renjie 2
- Ultraman Cosmos
- The Complex
- Ghost Theater
- Ultraman X
- The Chronicle Of A Tai-Chi Master
- Ultraman Orb
- Mirrorman
- Kamen Rider Agito

==== Upcoming ====
- Amazing Detective Di Renjie 3
- Young Sherlock

=== Anime films ===
- After School Midnighters
- Mazinkaiser SKL
- Kite
- Kite Liberator
- Bayonetta: Bloody Fate
- Blood-C: The Last Dark
- Eden of the East: Paradise Lost
- Eden of the East: The King of Eden
- Evangelion: 1.0 You Are (Not) Alone
- Evangelion: 2.0 You Can (Not) Advance
- Fafner in the Azure: Heaven and Earth
- Fairy Tail the Movie: Phoenix Priestess
- Fullmetal Alchemist: The Sacred Star of Milos
- Grave of the Fireflies
- King of Thorn
- Mass Effect: Paragon Lost
- Oblivion Island: Haruka and the Magic Mirror
- Origin: Spirits of the Past
- Revolutionary Girl Utena: The Movie
- Sengoku Basara: The Last Party
- Shakugan no Shana: The Movie
- Summer Wars
- Tales of Vesperia
- Tenchi the Movie: Tenchi Muyo in Love
- Tenchi the Movie 2: The Daughter of Darkness
- Trigun: Badlands Rumble
- Urusei Yatsura: Beautiful Dreamer
- Vexille

=== Live-action films ===
- Arcana (2013 film)
- Bang Rajan 2
- Battle of Demons
- Battle of Demons 2
- Battle of Demons 3
- Black Rat
- Creepy Hide & Seek
- Death Bell 2: Bloody Camp
- Death Blog
- Death on Live Streaming
- Death Kappa
- Death Trance
- Deep in the Jungle
- Eko Eko Azarak: The First Episode of Misa Kuroi
- Female Convict Scorpion (2008 film)
- Friday Killer
- Gallants
- Ghost Day
- Ghost Mother
- Meat Grinder
- Grotesque
- Hansel & Gretel (2007 film)
- Hanuman: The Monkey Warrior
- Hair Extensions
- Heaven and Hell
- Henge
- Horror Mansion: The Blind
- Karate Girl
- Kunoichi Hunters
- Kwaidan
- Nightfall
- Oh My Ghost
- Oh My Ghost 2
- Oh My Ghost 3
- Outerman
- Pahuyut Fighting Beat
- Perng Mang: The Haunted Drum
- Lady Ninja: Reflections of Darkness
- Legendary Amazons
- Little Big Soldier
- Ring of Curse
- Riki-Oh: The Story of Ricky
- Saturday Killer
- Stool Piegon
- Shinobi Girl: The Movie
- Siyama: Village of Warriors
- Spicy Robbery
- Sukima Onna
- Still
- Suzune Evolution
- Tajomaru
- Tomio
- The Assassins
- The Eight Inmortals in School II
- The Machine Girl
- The King of Fighters
- The Intruder
- Ichi The Killer
- The Legend of Sudsakorn
- The Possession in Japan
- The Rascals
- The Sisters
- The Tiger Blade
- Tokyo Gore Police
- Tokyo Gore School
- Train of the Dead
- Unborn Child
- Ultraman Mebius Side Story: Armored Darkness
- Ultraman Mebius Side Story: Ghost Reverse
- Ultraman Mebius Side Story: Hikari Saga
- War of the Arrows
- Wu Dang
- Yakuza Weapon
- Yakuza: Like a Dragon
- Young Gun In The Time
- Zomvideo
- Zombodian
- 009-1: The End of the Beginning
- Alien vs Ninja
- Goemon
- Higanjima: Escape from Vampire Island
- Ichi
- Kamui Gaiden
- Robogeisha
- Street Fighter: Assassin's Fist
- The Legend Is Born – Ip Man
- The Treasure Hunter
- Vampire Girl vs. Frankenstein Girl

=== OVAs ===
- Ai no Kusabi
- Holy Knight
- Shamanic Princess
- Super Robot Wars Original Generation: The Animation
- Black Lagoon OVA: Roberta's Blood Trail
- Baka and Test: Summon the Beasts OVA: Matsuri
- Gunslinger Girl -II Teatrino- OVA
- Hellsing Ultimate
- Project A-ko
- Project A-ko: Cinderella Rhapsody
- Project A-ko: Final
- Project A-ko: Plot of the Daitokuji
- Project A-ko: Vs. Series
- Record of Lodoss War
- Roujin Z
- School Rumble OVA: Extra Class
- Shakugan no Shana OVA: S
- Shakugan no Shana OVA: SP
- Tsubasa Spring Thunder Chronicles
- Tsubasa: Tokyo Revelations
