= Neo Ultra Q =

Japanese television series

- Genre: Tokusatsu; Science fiction Kaiju
- Created by: Tsuburaya Productions
- Developed by: Kiyotaka Inagaki
- Directed by: Gakuryū Ishii
- Starring: Seiichi Tanabe; Rin Takanashi; Hiroyuki Onoue
- Narrated by: Keishi Nagatsuka
- Country of origin: Japan
- No. of episodes: 12

Production
- Running time: 24 minutes (per episode)
- Production company: Tsuburaya Productions

Original release
- Network: WOWOW
- Release: January 12 – March 30, 2013

Related
- Ultra Galaxy Mega Monster Battle: Never Ending Odyssey; Ultraman Ginga

Neo Ultra Q (ネオ・ウルトラQ, Neo Urutora Kyū) is a 2013 Japanese television drama broadcast by WOWOW and produced by Tsuburaya Productions as the 25th entry in the Ultra Series. It is billed as a second season of the 1966 drama Ultra Q, which began the Ultra Series. It premiered on January 12, 2013.

On July 25, 2017, Toku announced that the series would air in the United States on its channel with English subtitles beginning August 15, 2017. The series was released on Blu-ray in the US by Mill Creek Entertainment on August 11, 2020.

== Cast ==
- Jin Haibara (南風原 仁, Haibara Jin; played by Seiichi Tanabe)
- Emiko Watarase (渡良瀬 絵美子, Watarase Emiko; played by Rin Takanashi)
- Shohei Shiroyama (白山 正平, Shiroyama Shōhei; played by Hiroyuki Onoue)
- Professor Yashima (屋島教授, Yashima-kyūju; played by Masahiko Shimada; episode 1)
- Associate Professor Tenge (丹下准教授, Tenge-junkyūju; played by Aoi Tatsumi; episode 1)

== List of episodes ==
1. Quo Vadis (クォ・ヴァディス, Kwo Vadisu)
  - Japanese airdate: January 12, 2013
  - American airdate: August 15, 2017
2. Laundry Day (洗濯の日, Sentaku no Hi)
  - Japanese airdate: January 19, 2013
  - American airdate: August 16, 2017
3. The Businessman Who Came From the Sky (宇宙（そら）から来たビジネスマン, Sora kara Kita Bijinesuman)
  - Japanese airdate: January 26, 2013
  - American airdate: August 17, 2017
4. Pandora's Cave (パンドラの穴, Pandora no Ana)
  - Japanese airdate: February 2, 2013
  - American airdate: August 18, 2017
5. The Town That Doesn't Speak (言葉のない街, Kotoba no Nai Machi)
  - Japanese airdate: February 9, 2013
  - American airdate: August 21, 2017
6. The Extremely Smelly Island (もっとも臭い島, Mottomo Kusai Shima)
  - Japanese airdate: February 16, 2013
  - American airdate: August 22, 2017
7. The Iron Shell (鉄の貝, Tetsu no Kai)
  - Japanese airdate: February 23, 2013
  - American airdate: August 23, 2017
8. Memories Are Crossing the Planet (思い出は惑星（ほし）を越えて, Omoide wa Hoshi o Koete)
  - Japanese airdate: March 3, 2013
  - American airdate: August 24, 2017
9. The Tokyo Protocol (東京プロトコル, Tōkyō Purotokoru)
  - Japanese airdate: March 9, 2013
  - American airdate: August 25, 2017
10. Falmagan and Michiru (ファルマガンとミチル, Farumagan to Michiru)
  - Japanese airdate: March 16, 2013
  - American airdate: August 28, 2017
11. Algoth Democracy (アルゴス・デモクラシー, Arugosu Demokurashī)
  - Japanese airdate: March 23, 2013
  - American airdate: August 29, 2017
12. Hominis Dignitati (ホミニス・ディグニターティ, Hominisu Digunitāti)
  - Japanese airdate: March 30, 2013
  - American airdate: August 30, 2017
