= Atomu Shimojō =

Japanese actor, voice actor and narrator (1946–2025)

- Born: November 26, 1946; Setagaya, Tokyo, Japan
- Died: January 29, 2025 (aged 78); Tokyo, Japan
- Occupation(s): Actor, voice actor
- Years active: 1971–2025

Atomu Shimojō (Japanese: 下條アトム, Hepburn: Shimojō Atomu; November 26, 1946 – January 29, 2025) was a Japanese actor, voice actor and narrator. He was the son of actor Masami Shimojō and actress Yoshiko Tagami. He voice acted Eddie Murphy and Paul Michael Glaser.

== Filmography ==
=== Film ===
- Brother and Sister (1976) – Kobata
- Mount Hakkoda (1977) – Private First-Class Hirayama
- Village of the Eight Gravestones (八つ墓村, Yatsu Haka-mura) (1977) – Officer Arai
- House on Fire (1986) – Nakajima
- Christmas Eve (クリスマス・イヴ) (2001)
- Sō kamoshirenai (そうかもしれない) (2005) – Sadao Tokioka
- Kamen Rider Hibiki & The Seven Senki (2005) – Ichirō Tachibana/Tōbei
- Junpei, Think Again (2018)
- Shadowfall (2019)
- Made in Heaven (2021)

=== Television ===
- Tokugawa Ieyasu (1983)

=== Voice-over ===
- Eddie Murphy
  - 48 Hrs. (1985 Nippon TV Wednesday Road Show edition) (Reggie Hammond)
  - Trading Places (1992 Fuji TV and DVD edition) (Billy Ray Valentine)
  - The Golden Child (1989 Fuji TV edition) (Chandler Jarrell)
  - Beverly Hills Cop II (1990 Fuji TV edition) (Detective Axel Foley)
  - Coming to America (1991 Fuji TV edition) (Prince Akeem Joffer, Clarence, Randy Watson, Saul)
  - Harlem Nights (1993 Fuji TV edition) (Quick)
  - Another 48 Hrs. (1994 Fuji TV edition) (Reggie Hammond)
  - Boomerang (1996 Fuji TV edition) (Marcus Graham)
  - The Distinguished Gentleman (1995 Fuji TV edition) (Thomas Jefferson Johnson)
  - Beverly Hills Cop III (2000 Fuji TV edition) (Detective Axel Foley)
  - Vampire in Brooklyn (2000 Fuji TV edition) (Maximillian, Preacher Pauly, Guido)
  - Dr. Dolittle 2 (2005 Fuji TV edition) (Doctor John Dolittle)
  - Showtime (VHS and DVD edition) (Officer Trey Sellars)
  - The Adventures of Pluto Nash (Pluto Nash)
- Fiddler on the Roof - Perchik
- Japan Ad Council commercials – Narrator
- Peanuts – Charlie Brown
- Sekai Ururun Taizaiki – Narrator
- Starsky and Hutch – David Starsky
