= Mayu Gamō =

Japanese actress (born 1982)

- 蒲生 麻由
- Born: March 16, 1982; Saitama Prefecture, Japan
- Years active: 1996-present
- Agents: Stardust Promotion (until 2010) Rinasce (2010–2017) Queen's Avenue (2017–2020); Enno (since 2020)
- Spouses: Yu Yumoto (m. 2010; div. 2014) unknown (m. 2016)
- Children: 1
- Website: http://www.mayugamo.com

Mayu Gamō (蒲生 麻由, Gamō Mayu, born March 16, 1982) is a Japanese actress born in Saitama Prefecture, Japan. She has starred in many films, most notably in Tokusou Sentai Dekaranger as Succubus Hells/ Human Fatale Camille. She reprised her role in Tokusou Sentai Dekaranger vs. Abaranger for a brief appearance. She also starred in Kamen Rider Hibiki as Kasumi Tachibana. Gamō is an active amateur marathon competitor and triathlete, having competed both in the Tokyo Marathon and in Hawaii, Paris, and Australia. She completed the 2011 Lavaman Triathlon in Anaehoomalu Bay, Hawaii.

== Filmography ==
=== Movies ===
2004

- Tokusou Sentai Dekaranger (TV series) – Camille / Succubus Hells (Ep. 21–23)

2005

- Gekijouban Kamen Rider Hibiki to 7-nin no senki
- Kamen Rider Hibiki: Asumu Henshin! You can be an Oni, too!! (video short) – Kasumi Tachibana/Kazue
- Tokusou Sentai Dekaranger vs. Abaranger (video short) – Succubus Hells / Camille
- Kamen Rider Hibiki (TV series) – Kasumi Tachibana

2007

- Hatachi no koibito (TV series) – Miki Takeuchi (Ep. 1, 4, 6–10)
- Speed Master
- H-code (TV series) – Rena Nishikido
- Ultra Galaxy Mega Monster Battle – Kate

2008

- Shaolin Girl
- Mayu Yamada – herself
- Ultra Galaxy Mega Monster Battle: Never Ending Odyssey – Kate

2009

- The Unbroken
- High-Kick Girl
- Hien – herself

2010

- Sayonara Itsuka

=== Commercials ===
2007

- Axe Deodorant Bodyspray - teacher
