= Ultra Galaxy Mega Monster Battle =

- Genre: Tokusatsu; Sci-Fi; Kaiju; Action/Adventure
- Created by: Tsuburaya Productions
- Developed by: Kenichi Araki
- Directed by: Yuichi Kikuchi
- Starring: Shota Minami; Saki Kamiryo; Toru Hachinohe; Mitsutoshi Shundo; Hiroyuki Konishi
- Opening theme: "eternal traveller" by Project DMM
- Ending theme: "JUMP UP" by Lekkazan
- Composer: Toshihiko Sahashi
- Country of origin: Japan
- Original language: Japanese
- No. of episodes: 13

Production
- Executive producer: Kazuo Tsuburaya
- Running time: 25 minutes
- Production companies: Tsuburaya Productions; Nippon BS Broadcasting

Original release
- Network: BS11
- Release: December 1, 2007 – February 23, 2008

Related
- Ultraseven X; Never Ending Odyssey

Ultra Galaxy Mega Monster Battle (ウルトラギャラクシー大怪獣バトル, Urutora Gyarakushī Daikaijū Batoru) is the first season of its series that is the 23rd entry in the Tsuburaya's long-running Ultra Series. It is an adaption of the video game Mega Kaiju Battle: Ultra Monsters. The show first aired on December 1, 2007 and concluded on February 23, 2008. On December 20, 2008, the second season titled Ultra Galaxy Mega Monster Battle: Never Ending Odyssey (ウルトラギャラクシー大怪獣バトル ＮＥＶＥＲ ＥＮＤＩＮＧ ＯＤＹＳＳＥＹ, Urutora Gyarakushī Daikaijū Batoru Nebā Endingu Odessei; Ultra Galaxy Mega Monster Battle: NEO) premiered. Ultra Galaxy was the first Ultra Series to be shown as a pay-per-view service.

On July 25, 2017, Toku announced that the series (along with its second season) would air in the United States on its channel with English subtitles beginning August 31, 2017.

== Plot ==
50 years after the extinction of monsters, humanity had finally advanced to outer space.

The crews of Space Pendragon were tasked to investigate Planet Boris after communications on that planet were mysteriously halted. Arriving on the planet, the crew was astonished to find it inhabited by monsters, with every nearby city destroyed. While forced to wait for reinforcements, the crew must solve the mystery of this planet's background as a monster tamer named Rei, whose past remained mysterious, joined ZAP SPACY in order to learn his past.

== Characters ==
=== Monsters of Planet Boris ===
- Subterranean Monster Telesdon (地底怪獣 テレスドン, Chitei Kaijū Teresudon; 1, 2, 7): The first monster to appear in the series, Talesdon attacked Sadola before Red King joined the commotion and beaten the two, forcing Telesdon to retreat while Sadora died from its fight. It soon resurfaced and attacked the Pendragon before Rei summoned his Gomora and defeated it. Another Telesdon was summoned by Bullton as its fight representative alongside Red King and Neronga but was unfortunately tricked into attacking its own allies before being killed by Gomora. First appeared in episode 22 of Ultraman.
- Rock Monster Sadora (岩石怪獣 サドラ, Ganseki Kaijū Sadora; 1, 5, 6): A monster who fought Telesdon before being defeated by Red King, therefore marking its first kill. Several Sadora appeared later on in episode 5, with a total of eight killed by Kate's Fire Golza and five others in later episode were killed by ZAP Spacy. First appeared in episode 3 of Return of Ultraman.
- Skull Monster Red King (どくろ怪獣 レッドキング, Dokuro Kaijū Reddo Kingu; 1, 7, 11): One of the earliest monsters to arrive on Planet Boris following Bullton, Red King firstly killed Sadora before setting its sight on the ZAP Spacy's Pendragon, only to be killed by Rei's Gomora. Another Red King was summoned by Bullton as a fight representative against ZAP Spacy alongside Telesdon and Neronga before it was killed by Gomora and Litra. First appeared in episode 8 of Ultraman.
- Freezing Monster Peguila (冷凍怪獣 ペギラ, Reito Kaijū Pegira; 1): Only appeared as a carcass, Rei first emerged from the monster, which eventually leads him to his first encounter with ZAP Spacy. First appeared in episode 5 of Ultra Q.
- Centipede Monster Mukadender (百足怪獣 ムカデンダー, Hyakusoku Kaijū Mukadendā; 2): Only appeared as a carcass, Mukadender's death was caused by a Golza with ZAP Spacy initially mistaking Rei's monster as its perpetrator. First appeared in episode 26 of Ultraman Taro.
- Giant Plant Juran (巨大植物 ジュラン, Kyodai Shokubutsu Juran; 2): A giant flower which encountered the ZAP Spacy, it began to attack them until Litra fired its Citronella Acid to destroy it. First appeared in episode 5 of Ultra Q, where it was also called by the name Mammoth Flower (マンモスフラワー, Manmosu Furawā).
- Super Ancient Monster Golza (超古代怪獣 ゴルザ, Chō Kodai Kaijū Goruza; 2): A monster which previously killed Mukadender. Alongside Telesdon, it tried to attack ZAP Spacy until both were defeated by Gomora. First appeared in episode 1 of Ultraman Tiga.
- Transparent Monster Neronga (透明怪獣 ネロンガ, Tōmei Kaijū Neronga; 3, 7): A monster with the ability to turn invisible and manipulate electricity. Having defeated a Gudon, it attacked the Space Pendragon during the night to absorb its electricity before moving on towards a facility. Although using its invisibility again, Rei's hearings allowed Gomora to turn the tides and finish it. Another Neronga was summoned sometime later by Bullton as a fight representative alongside Telesdon and Red King but was quickly defeated when Telesdon accidentally attacked the monster. First appeared in episode 3 of Ultraman.
- Underground Monster Gudon (地底怪獣 グドン, Chitei Kaijū Gudon; 3): A monster that first fought Neronga before being killed with relative ease. First appeared in episode 5 of Return of Ultraman.
- Great Space Monster Bemstar (宇宙大怪獣 ベムスター, Uchū Daikaijū Bemusutā; 4): A monster which attacked the Resort and Transport Base, this monster was thought to be the murderer of Haruna's brother, driving her to a conquest for vengeance before Rei joined in to save her. Although shown with the ability to absorb incoming attacks, the strategized formation of Litra and Gomora allowed the monster to be killed. First appeared in episode 18 of Return of Ultraman.

== Episodes ==
No.	Title	Directed by	Written by	Original air date	English air date
1	"The Lawless Monster Planet"; Transliteration: "Kaijū Muhō Wakusei" (Japanese: 怪獣無法惑星)	Yuichi Kikuchi	Kenichi Araki	December 1, 2007	August 31, 2017
The Space Pendragon crew of the ZAP SPACY received a call from Earth to investigate Planet Boris after communications were mysteriously cut off. Their ship however suffered from severe damage after they were forced to crash land on that planet. While searching for civilians in a nearby city, they discovered several monsters which had supposedly been extinct on Earth and a survivor appeared from one of the monsters' carcass. With the Space Pendragon under attack by Red King, the mysterious man released his monster, Gomora and rescued the ship by killing Red King.
2	"The Fifth Crewman"; Transliteration: "Goninme no Kurū" (Japanese: 五人目のクルー)	Yuichi Kikuchi	Kenichi Araki	December 8, 2007	September 1, 2017
The mysterious man tried to escape from ZAP SPACY as the team tried to search for him, wanting to know what happened to Planet Boris. After an encounter with the giant flower Juran, the crew were saved by Litra, but with the bird in death's doors, the mysterious man absorbed it into his device. The mysterious man, Rei, had no answer to his past life but confirmed himself not to be the culprit of the monster attacks. After saving ZAP SPACY again from Golza, Rei wandered off and received a strange vision.
3	"The Invisible Monster Attacks!"; Transliteration: "Tōmei Kaijū Shūgeki!" (Japanese: 透明怪獣襲撃！)	Tsugumi Kitaura	Keiichi Hasegawa	December 15, 2007	September 4, 2017
At night, the Pendragon is under attack from a monster but before Rei can release Gomora, the opponent was nowhere to be seen. The next day, Haruna went to get some spare parts with Rei offering her services, despite the former blaming him for the attack last night. At the Electrical Plant, the two were under attack by Neronga, whom feeds electricity from that plant, as well as the true identity of Pendragon's attacker. After Rei managed to kill Neronga with Gomora, Haruna finally trusted him as the former finally received a proper membership into the team.
4	"Bemstar Has Arrived!"; Transliteration: "Bemusutā Sanjō!" (Japanese: ベムスター参上！)	Tsugumi Kitaura	Kenichi Araki	December 22, 2007	September 5, 2017
The crew comes across mysterious footprints, which were revealed to be made by Bemstar. Following the destruction of a Resort and Transport Base, Haruna deduced that her brother was killed by Bemstar as well and decided to take matters on her own to attack the monster. Fortunately, she was saved by Rei and via strategic attacks, both Gomora and Litra were able to kill the monster. In aftermath of the battle, Oki deduced that the giant Rei saw in his vision is in fact Ultraman.
5	"The Trap in Belargo City"; Transliteration: "Berarugo Shiti no Wana" (Japanese: ベラルゴシティの罠)	Tsugumi Kitaura	Keiichi Hasegawa	December 29, 2007	September 6, 2017
After picking up a distress signal from previous events, the ZAP SPACY arrives at the now abandoned Belargo City, where they find and rescue its only known survivor, Azusa Maki. Shortly after saving her from the Space Beast, Banpira, Azusa shows her true colors by revealing that she too can control Monsters, when she unleashes Fire Golza to attack the ZAP SPACY members. Despite being put in a tough battle, Gomora eventually wins. However after betraying her Fire Golza and destroying it with her Gan-Q, Azusa states that her real name is "Kate" and she intends on making Rei stronger, by telling the ZAP SPACY that he is to blame for Boris's destruction.
6	"Another Monster Tamer"; Transliteration: "Mō Hitori no Kaijūtsukai" (Japanese: もう一人の怪獣使い)	Tsugumi Kitaura	Keiichi Hasegawa	January 5, 2008	September 7, 2017
With Kate having deceived the ZAP SPACY that Rei is the culprit of Boris's destruction, tension between the team and Rei quickly escalates and he leaves. However, it is revealed that Rei was placed in a trap, and Kate kidnaps Oki to use him as a hostage to force Rei to battle her Gan-Q on his own. Despite previously being weakened from his battle with Fire Golza, Gomora manages to fight back long enough for the ZAP SPACY to learn of Kate's true nature and they assist Rei in destroying her monster. Before fleeing though, Kate reiterates her intentions to make Rei stronger.
7	"The Stone Which Calls Monsters"; Transliteration: "Kaijū o Yobu Ishi" (Japanese: 怪獣を呼ぶ石)	Hirochika Muraishi	Kenichi Araki	January 12, 2008	September 8, 2017
Rei is visited by a ghost from his past when he lands in a desolate Observatory. After finding some evidence, Rei's origins and the truth behind Boris's destruction are revealed simultaneously: Rei was discovered as an infant inside of the SpaceTime Monster, Bullton, which had used its dimension bending abilities to cause Monsters to appear all over the planet. Shortly after learning of what was the cause of the Monsters' appearance, Bullton makes its presence known and it attacks the team with its summoned monsters: Frogros, Neronga, Talesdon, and Red King. Luckily, all of the monsters are destroyed by Gomora and Litra.
8	"The Underwater King"; Transliteration: "Suichū no Ōja" (Japanese: 水中の王者)	Hirochika Muraishi	Takahiko Masuda	January 19, 2008	September 11, 2017
After the monsters Kelbim and Arstron are killed in battle, the ZAP SPACY discovers that the monster, Eleking, is hiding inside of a lake with a highly conductive mineral known as "Sulite." Fearing that Eleking's electricity could destroy Boris by agitating the sulite, the ZAP SPACY scrambles to deal with the monster with help from a Laser Net and Gomora, and after a few hiccups, the monster is defeated! Rather than killing Eleking though, Rei decides to tame the monster and use it as his next partner, after being impressed by its tenacity in battle.
9	"The Pendragon Doesn't Rise to the Surface!"; Transliteration: "Pendoragon Fujōsezu!" (Japanese: ペンドラゴン浮上せず！)	Hirochika Muraishi	Masanao Akahoshi	January 26, 2008	September 12, 2017
After picking up a faint distress signal at the end of the previous episode, the ZAP SPACY hurries off to Vincent Island to find the signal's source. During their journey though, the Space Pendragon comes under attack by four black spaceships that shoot the team down and submerge them into the ocean. The ZAP SPACY must now race against time to repair their ship before they suffocate or drown, with Kumano repairing the engines, and Rei and Eleking dealing with the hostile undersea monsters that lie beneath the surface.
10	"Unexpected Reunion"; Transliteration: "Yoki Senu Saikai" (Japanese: 予期せぬ再会)	Hirochika Muraishi	Keiichi Hasegawa	February 2, 2008	September 13, 2017
Arriving on Vincent Island, the ZAP SPACY are delighted to learn that another ZAP team had survived the Monster invasion, along with 53 survivors, as well as Haruna's presumed-dead brother, Hiroki. Learning that their ship, the Gostar Dragon is in need of repairs in order to rescue the survivors, both ZAP factions head off to the Grand Cape Supply Base to retrieve the necessary parts to repair Hiroki's ship, which is being guarded by the monsters: Nova, Salamandora, and Lunaticks. Their situation turns worse when Rei and Gomora are confronted by the four black spaceships, which take on their true form: Black King Joe!
11	"Ultraman"; Transliteration: "Urutoraman" (Japanese: ウルトラマン)	Yuichi Kikuchi	Kenichi Araki	February 9, 2008	September 14, 2017
Rei receives his strongest vision ever from Ultraman, confirming that he is somewhere on Vincent Island. Before he can go off, he is met by a mysterious little girl named "Karen." It is revealed that when Bullton unleashed all of the Monsters to attack Boris, Karen found Rei when he was still a baby and took care of him until he disappeared into a ball of light. Suddenly when the Terrible-Monsters, Verokron and Doragory attack Vincent Island, they are confronted and dealt with by Gomora and Eleking, to which Rei discovers that the island's protector is none other than Ultraman himself, who has been sealed into a mountainside.
12	"Reiblood"; Transliteration: "Reiburaddo" (Japanese: レイブラッド)	Yuichi Kikuchi	Kenichi Araki	February 16, 2008	September 15, 2017
Kate returns for a rematch against Rei, this time with the strongest monster in her arsenal: Zetton. Despite the odds being in Rei's favor, Gomora, Litra, and Eleking are all taken down by Zetton's overwhelming strength and abilities, leaving Kate victorious. Later on, Rei is confronted by Kate yet again, who finally reveals to Rei that he is a "Reiblood". Specifically, a Reionics of Earth, the strongest of his kind, who has been chosen to inherit the power of the ruler of all Reibloods, Alien Reiblood. Meanwhile, the ZAP factions discover something horrifying... Boris's artificial sun is on a collision course with the planet after being sabotaged by Black King Joe!
13	"Planet Escape"; Transliteration: "Wakusei Dasshutsu" (Japanese: 惑星脱出)	Yuichi Kikuchi	Kenichi Araki	February 23, 2008	September 18, 2017
As the ZAP factions race against time to prepare for their departure from Boris with the survivors in tow before the artificial sun destroys the planet, Rei and Kate face each other in one final battle, with Kate firmly intent on awakening Rei's latent powers. However, their battle is interrupted by Black King Joe, who is intent on killing Rei before Kate can do so.

== Principal cast ==
- Rei (レイ) - Shota Minami (南 翔太, Minami Shōta)
- Haruna (ハルナ) - Saki Kamiryo (上良 早紀, Kamiryō Saki)
- Oki (オキ) - Toru Hachinohe (八戸 亮, Hachinohe Tōru)
- Kumano (クマノ) - Mitsutoshi Shundo (俊藤 光利, Shundō Mitsutoshi)
- Hyuga (ヒュウガ, Hyūga) - Hiroyuki Konishi (小西 博之, Konishi Hiroyuki)
- Kate (ケイト, Keito) - Mayu Gamo (蒲生 麻由, Gamō Mayu)
- Karen (カレン) - Natsumi Yamada (山田 夏海, Yamada Natsumi)
- Hiroki (ヒロキ) - Shigeki Kagemaru (影丸 茂樹, Kagemaru Shigeki)
- Ato (アトウ, Atō) - Hideaki Ishii (石井 英明, Ishii Hideaki)

=== Suit actors ===
- Gomora - Kazunori Yokoo (横尾 和則, Yokoo Kazunori)
- Reimon - Hiroyuki Inomata (猪又 浩之, Inomata Hiroyuki)
- Monsters - Daisuke Terai (寺井 大介, Terai Daisuke), Ryo Nishimura (西村 郎, Nishimura Ryō), Hiroshi Suenaga (末永 博志, Suenaga Hiroshi), Kenya Soma (相馬 絢也, Sōma Kenya), Tomomi Ota (太田 智美, Ōta Tomomi), Shinya Iwasaki (岩崎 晋弥, Iwasaki Shinya), Daisuke Fukuda (福田 大助, Fukuda Daisuke), Satoshi Yamamoto (山本 諭, Yamamoto Satoshi), Tatsunari Fukushima (福島 龍成, Fukushima Tatsunari), Hideyoshi Iwata (岩田 栄慶, Iwata Hideyoshi)

== Songs ==
Opening theme

- "eternal traveller" (エターナル・トラベラー, Etānaru Toraberā)
  - Lyrics, Composition, Arrangement: Kazuya Daimon (大門 一也, Daimon Kazuya)
  - Artist: Project DMM

Ending theme

- "JUMP UP" (ジャンプ アップ, Janpu Appu)
  - Lyrics & Composition: Bayner (ベーナー, Bēnā)
  - Arrangement: Hideki Tama (田靡 秀樹, Tama Hideki) & Lekkazan
  - Artist: Lekkazan (烈火斬, Rekkazan)
