= Ultra Galaxy Mega Monster Battle: Never Ending Odyssey =

- Promotional poster
- Genre: Tokusatsu; Sci-Fi; Kaiju; Action/Adventure
- Created by: Tsuburaya Productions
- Developed by: Kenichi Araki
- Directed by: Yuichi Kikuchi
- Starring: Shota Minami; Saki Kamiryo; Toru Hachinohe; Mitsutoshi Shundo; Hiroyuki Konishi
- Opening theme: "Chikai" by Keizo Nakanishi
- Ending theme: "Ai no Shirushi" by Keizo Nakanishi
- Composers: Fumio Hara; Takefumi Kawamoto; Nobuhiko Morino; Yasuhiro Ueda
- Country of origin: Japan
- Original language: Japanese
- No. of episodes: 13

Production
- Running time: 25 minutes
- Production companies: Tsuburaya Productions; Nippon BS Broadcasting

Original release
- Network: BS11
- Release: December 20, 2008 – March 14, 2009

Related
- Ultra Galaxy Mega Monster Battle; Neo Ultra Q

Ultra Galaxy Mega Monster Battle: Never Ending Odyssey (ウルトラギャラクシー大怪獣バトル NEVER ENDING ODYSSEY, Urutora Gyarakushī Daikaijū Batoru Nebā Endingu Odessei; or simply known as Ultra Galaxy Mega Monster Battle NEO) is the second season and the 24th entry in the Tsuburaya's long-running Ultra Series. Like its predecessor Ultra Galaxy Mega Monster Battle, NEO is a pay-per-view service. The first episode was distributed for free online on December 12, 2008, and remained available until January 31, 2009. The show was broadcast on BS11 beginning December 20, 2008. The series was followed by Mega Monster Battle Gymnastics (大怪獣バトル体操, Daikaijū Batoru Taisō), a non-canon morning exercise program for children starring Shota Minami. Mega Monster Battle Gymnastics also had a touring stage show with dancing and exercises set to music and starring Shota Minami, with cameo appearances by Hiroyuki Konishi and Saki Kamiryo.

On July 25, 2017, Toku announced that the series (along with its first season) would air in the United States on its channel with English subtitles beginning September 19, 2017.

== Plot ==
One month after the events of the last series, ZAP Spacy finds itself under attack by the Reionics Hunters, members of the Alien Pedan, and the creators of the original King Joe Black, that seek to exterminate all Reionics in the universe. The story takes place on Planet Hammer where ZAP Spacy finds itself battling the Reionics, Reionics Hunters, and the originator of the Reionics, Reiblood.

== Episodes ==
1. Reionics Hunter (レイオニクスハンター, Reionikusu Hantā)
2. Reionics Battle (レイオニクスバトル, Reionikusu Batoru)
3. Great Frenzy! Reionic Burst (大暴走！レイオニックバースト, Daibōsō! Reionikku Bāsuto)
4. Disturbing Reunion (困惑の再会, Konwaku no Saikai)
5. At the End of the Rampage (暴走の果てに, Bōsō no Hate ni)
6. The Strongest Reioncs (史上最強のレイオニクス, Shijō Saikyō no Reionikusu)
7. The Second Awakening (第二覚醒, Dai Ni Kakusei)
8. Shoot the Infiltrator! (潜入者を撃て！, Sennyūsha o Ute!)
9. Armour of Darkness (暗黒の鎧, Ankoku no Yoroi)
10. The New Horizon of War (新たな戦いの地平で, Arata na Tatakai no Chihei de)
11. A Warrior's Grave Marker (ある戦士の墓標, Aru Senshi no Bohyō)
12. Grande's Challenge (グランデの挑戦, Gurande no Chōsen)
13. Planet Destruction (惑星崩壊, Wakusei Hōkai)

== Cast ==
- Rei (レイ) - Shota Minami (南 翔太, Minami Shōta)
- Haruna (ハルナ) - Saki Kamiryo (上良 早紀, Kamiryō Saki)
- Oki (オキ) - Toru Hachinohe (八戸 亮, Hachinohe Tōru)
- Kumano (クマノ) - Mitsutoshi Shundo (俊藤 光利, Shundō Mitsutoshi)
- Hyuga (ヒュウガ, Hyūga) - Hiroyuki Konishi (小西 博之, Konishi Hiroyuki)
- Dail (ダイル, Dairu) - Kosei Kato (加藤 厚成, Katō Kōsei)
- Harlan (ハーラン, Hāran) - Shion Nakamaru (中丸 シオン, Nakamaru Shion)
- Grande (グランデ, Gurande) - Mitsuru Karahashi (唐橋 充, Karahashi Mitsuru)
- Kate (ケイト, Keito) - Mayu Gamo (蒲生 麻由, Gamō Mayu)

=== Suit actors ===
- Gomora - Kazunori Yokoo (横尾 和則, Yokoo Kazunori), Ryo Nishimura (西村 郎, Nishimura Ryō)
- Reimon - Hiroyuki Inomata (猪又 浩之, Inomata Hiroyuki)
- Monsters - Daisuke Terai (寺井 大介, Terai Daisuke), Koji Maruyama (丸山 貢治, Maruyama Kōji), Reki Sakurai (櫻井 暦, Sakurai Reki), Daisuke Fukuda (福田 大助, Fukuda Daisuke), Hiroshi Suenaga (末永 博志, Suenaga Hiroshi), Hideyoshi Iwata (岩田 栄慶, Iwata Hideyoshi), Shinya Iwasaki (岩崎 晋弥, Iwasaki Shinya), Ikumi Tanoue (田之上 生海, Tanoue Ikumi)

== Songs ==
Opening theme

- "Chikai" (誓い; "Vow")

Ending theme

- "Ai no Shirushi" (愛のしるし; "Proof of Love")
  - Lyrics: Keizo Nakanishi, Yuri Takaku (田角 有里, Takaku Yuri)
  - Composition: Keizo Nakanishi
  - Arrangement: Takao Konishi (小西 貴雄, Konishi Takao)
  - Artist: Keizo Nakanishi (中西 圭三, Nakanishi Keizō)
