= Henshin (disambiguation) =

Henshin may refer to:

== Literature ==
- Metamorphosis (manga) (Japanese: 変身, romanized: Henshin, lit. 'Transformation', へんしん), a 2013-2016 Japanese pornographic comic book by ShindoL
- Henshin (manga), a 2013 Japanese comic book by Ken Niimura
- Henshin (novel; Japanese: 変身, romanized: Henshin, lit. 'Transformation', へんしん), a 1991 Japanese novel by Keigo Higashino
- Henshin (novel; Japanese: 変身, romanized: Henshin, lit. 'Metamorphosis', へんしん), a 2007 Japanese novel by Novala Takemoto

=== Chapters ===
- "Henshin" (manga serial chapter; Japanese: 変身, romanized: Henshin, lit. 'Transformation', へんしん), chapter 68 of Japanese comic book Act-Age
- "Henshin" (manga serial chapter; Japanese: 変身, romanized: Henshin, lit. 'Transformation', へんしん), chapter 76 of the Japanese comic book Arata: The Legend; see List of Arata: The Legend chapters
- "Henshin" (manga serial chapter; Japanese: 変身, romanized: Henshin, lit. 'Transformation', へんしん), chapter 5 of the Japanese comic book Blue Seed
- "Henshin" (manga serial chapter; Japanese: 変身, romanized: Henshin, lit. 'Transformation', へんしん), chapter 6 of Japanese comic book Elfen Lied; see List of Elfen Lied chapters
- "Henshin" (manga serial chapter), chapter of Japanese comic book Kamen Rider Spirits
- "Henshin!" (manga serial chapter; Japanese: 変身!, romanized: Henshin!, lit. 'Transform!', へんしん!), chapter 153 of the Japanese comic book My Hero Academia; see List of My Hero Academia chapters
- "Henshin" (manga serial chapter; Japanese: 変身, romanized: Henshin, lit. 'Transformation', へんしん), chapter 60 of Japanese comic book The Legend of the Strongest, Kurosawa!
- "Henshin" (manga serial chapter; Japanese: 返信, romanized: Henshin, lit. 'Reply', へんしん), chapter 28 of Japanese comic book A Silent Voice (manga)
- "Henshin" (manga serial chapter; Japanese: 変身, romanized: Henshin, lit. 'Transformation', へんしん), chapter 87 of the Japanese comic book Suzuka; see List of Suzuka chapters
- "Henshin" (manga serial chapter; Japanese: 変身, romanized: Henshin, lit. 'Transformation', へんしん), chapter 82 of Japanese comic book To Love Ru; see List of To Love Ru chapters
- "Henshin" (manga serial chapter; Japanese: 変身, romanized: Henshin, lit. 'Metamorphosis', へんしん), chapter 58 of the Japanese comic book The World God Only Knows; see List of The World God Only Knows chapters

== Television and film ==
- Henshin (TV series), a 1993 Japanese TV show by screenwriter Miyuki Miyabe
- Henshin (TV series), a 2014 Japanese TV drama starring Ryūnosuke Kamiki
- "Henshin" (video), a 2006 Japanese video directed by Wataru Takeishi
- Henshin (film; Japanese: 変身, romanized: Henshin, lit. 'Transformation', へんしん), a 2005 Japanese film starring Hiroshi Tamaki
- Henshin (film), a 2008 3d animated film at the Nicktoons Film Festival

=== Episodes ===
- "Henshin" (TV episode; Japanese: 変身, romanized: Henshin, lit. 'Metamorphosis', へんしん), 1966 episode 22 of live-action tokusatsu kaiju show Ultra Q
- "Henshin" (TV episode; Japanese: 変身, romanized: Henshin, へんしん), 1984 episode 40 of Japanese TV drama Sanga Moyu
- "Henshin" (TV episode; Japanese: 変身, romanized: Henshin, lit. 'Transformation', へんしん), 2000 episode 2 of live-action tokusatsu super sentai show Kamen Rider Kuuga
- "Henshin" (TV episode; Japanese: へんしん, romanized: Henshin, lit. 'Transformation'), 2010 episode 15 of animation Amagami SS; see List of Amagami SS episodes
- "Henshin" (TV episode; Japanese: 変身, romanized: Henshin, lit. 'Transformation', へんしん), 2011 episode of animation Bakugan: Gundalian Invaders
- "Henshin" (TV episode; Japanese: 変身, romanized: Henshin, lit. 'Transformation', へんしん), 2014 episode 14 of live-action tokusatsu show Garo: Makai no Hana; see List of Garo: Makai no Hana episodes
- "Henshin" (TV episode; Japanese: 変身, romanized: Henshin, lit. 'The Metamorphosis', へんしん), 2014 episode 1 of Parasyte -the maxim-; see List of Parasyte -the maxim- episodes
- "Henshin!" (TV episode; Japanese: へんしん!, romanized: Henshin!, lit. 'Transform!'), 2015 season 7 episode 222 of animation Fairy Tail;
- "Henshin" (TV episode; Japanese: 変身, romanized: Henshin, lit. 'Transformation', へんしん), 2019 season 3 number 4 episode 26 of animation Date A Live;

== Music ==
- "Henshin" (album), a 2012 album by 'Chatmonchy'

=== Songs ===
- "Henshin" (song; Japanese: へんしん), a 2014 song by 'Bakudan Johnny' (Japanese: 爆弾ジョニー) off the album Hajimete no Bakudan Johnny (Japanese: はじめての爆弾ジョニー)
- "Henshin" (song; Japanese: 返信, romanized: Henshin, lit. 'Reply', へんしん), a 2006 song by Mariya Takeuchi off the album Denim
- "Henshin" (song; Japanese: 変身, romanized: Henshin, lit. 'Metamorphosis', へんしん), a 2002 song by Jun Shibata off the album Sore Demo Kita Michi
- "Henshin (Reborn)" (Japanese: 変身 (REBORN)), a 1991 song by 'Buck-Tick' off the album Kurutta Taiyou
- "Henshin" (song; Japanese: 変身, romanized: Henshin, lit. 'Transformation', へんしん), a tune from Love Hina TV show; see List of Love Hina soundtracks
- "Henshin!?" (song; Japanese: 変身!?, romanized: Henshin!?, lit. 'Transformation!?', へんしん!?), a tune from Love Hina TV show; see List of Love Hina soundtracks

== Characters ==
- Henshin Heroine (Japanese: 変身ヒロイン, romanized: henshin hiroin, lit. 'transforming heroine'), a character type from various magical girl animanga, cartoons, and comics
- Henshin Hero, a character type from various tokusatsu TV shows and films such as Super Sentai and Kamen Rider
  - Rider Henshin, the transformation phrase used by Takeshi Hongo in Kamen Rider (1971 TV series)
  - Henshin V3, the transformation phrase used by Shiro Kazumi in Kamen Rider V3
  - Sky Henshin, the transformation phrase used by Hiroshi Tsukuba in Kamen Rider (1979 TV series)

== Other uses ==
- Henshin (software), a software application package for software engineering that performs graph rewriting
- Henshin, a Japanese fusion restaurant in Gama Tower, Jakarta, Indonesia
- henshin, a tourist activity to transform into an ersatz maiko or geisha

== See also ==
- The dictionary definition of 変身 at Wiktionary
- The dictionary definition of 返信 at Wiktionary
- 変身 (disambiguation)
