= Metamorphosis (disambiguation) =

Metamorphosis is a biological process by which an animal physically develops after birth.

Metamorphosis may also refer to:

- Metamorphism, a geological process
- Metamorphosis (illusion), a stage illusion invented by John Nevil Maskelyne
- Shapeshifting, a common theme in mythology, folklore and other fiction

== Art ==
- the Transfiguration of Jesus is called the metamorphosis in Greek, and often in English in discussing Greek Orthodox theology and art
- Three woodcut prints by M. C. Escher:
  - Metamorphosis I (1937)
  - Metamorphosis II (1939/40)
  - Metamorphosis III (1967/68)
- Metamorphosis (Miró), a series of collage-drawings by Joan Miró, made between 1935 and 1936
- Metamorphosis (manga) (also known as Emergence), a 2016 pornographic manga

== Books ==
- The Metamorphosis (play), a 1783 play by the Irish writer William Jackson
- The Metamorphosis, a 1915 novella by Franz Kafka
- The Metamorphosis, a 1969 play by Steven Berkoff adapted from the work by Kafka
- The Metamorphosis (short story) a 1971 short story by Joyce Carol Oates
- Metamorphosis : How and Why We Change, 2014 non-fiction book by Polly Morland

== Film and television ==
=== Film ===
- Metamorphosis (1975 film), a student film by Barry Greenwald, winner of the Short Film Palme d'Or
- Metamorphosis, a 1987 TV movie directed by Jim Goddard
- Metamorphosis (1990 Italian film), a 1990 Italian science fiction horror movie by George Eastman
- Metamorphosis: The Alien Factor, a 1990 science fiction horror movie by Glenn Takajian
- Metamorphosis (2012 film), a 2012 film adaptation of Kafka's work of the same name
- Metamorphosis (2019 South Korean film), a film starring Bae Seong-woo
- Metamorphosis (2019 Philippine film), a film starring Gold Azeron

=== Television ===
- "Metamorphosis" (H_{2}O: Just Add Water)
- "Metamorphosis" (Justice League)
- "Metamorphosis" (Runaways), an episode of Runaways
- "Metamorphosis" (Sanctuary)
- "Metamorphosis" (Smallville)
- "Metamorphosis" (Star Trek: The Original Series)
- "Metamorphosis" (Star Wars: The Bad Batch)
- "Metamorphosis" (Stargate SG-1)
- "Metamorphosis" (Supernatural)
- "The Metamorphosis" (The O.C.)
- Metamorphosis (TV series), a 2007 Singaporean action thriller drama

== Music ==
=== Classical ===
- Metamorphosis-Symphonies, three symphonies by Martin Scherber
- Metamorphosis, a piece for piano by Philip Glass
- Metamorphosen, a composition for 23 solo strings by Richard Strauss
- Metamorphosen, the subtitle of Violin Concerto No. 2, a composition by Krzysztof Penderecki

=== Albums ===
- Metamorphosis (Arthur Blythe album)
- Metamorphosis (Circle of Dust album)
- Metamorphosis (Culture Beat album)
- Metamorphosis (Don Friedman album)
- Metamorphosis (Hilary Duff album)
- Metamorphosis (Iron Butterfly album)
- Metamorphosis (Mercenary album)
- Metamorphosis (Papa Roach album)
- Metamorphosis (Pillar album)
- Metamorphosis (The Rolling Stones album)
- Metamorphosis (Wade Marcus album)
- Metamorphosis (World Saxophone Quartet album)
- Metamorphosis (Yeng Constantino album)
- Metamorphosis (Yolanda Soares album)
- Metamorphosis (Zero Hour album)
- Metamorphosis (EP), by Ulver
- Metamorphosis, by Dead End
- Metamorphosis, by J.R.
- Metamorphosis, by Magenta

=== Songs ===
- "Metamorphosis", a song by Blue Stahli from Blue Stahli
- "Metamorphosis", a song by Coroner from Mental Vortex
- "Metamorphosis", a song by Metalium from Millennium Metal – Chapter One
- "Metamorphosis", a song by Northlane from Discoveries
- "Metamorphosis", a song by Pet Shop Boys from Bilingual
- "M3tamorphosis", a song by Playboi Carti from Whole Lotta Red
- "Metamorphosis", a theme from the music of Final Fantasy VI
- "Metamorphose" (Shizuka Kudo song)
- "Metamorphosis" (Interworld song)

== Video games ==
- Metamorphosis (video game), a 2020 adventure game by Ovid Works published by All in! Games

== See also ==
- Metamorfosi (disambiguation)
- Metamorfosis (disambiguation)
- Metamorphism (disambiguation)
- Metamorphoses (disambiguation)
- Métamorphose (disambiguation)
- 変身 (disambiguation)
