= Metamorfosi (disambiguation) =

Metamorfosi is a suburb of Athens, Greece.

Metamorfosi may also refer to:

== Places in Greece ==
- Metamorfosi, Chalkidiki, a village in the municipal unit Chalkidiki in Polygyros
- Metamorfosi, Kilkis, a village in the municipal unit Kilkis in Polykastro
- Metamorfosi, Kozani, a municipal department of the city of Kozani
- Metamorfosi, Laconia, a village in Laconia
- Metamorfosi Sotiros, a neighbourhood of the city of Patras
- Metamorfosi, Kastoria, a village in the municipal unit Vitsi in Kastoria

== Music ==
- Metamorfosi (band), an Italian symphonic rock band
- Metamorfosi (album), Italian singer Noemi's sixth studio album, released in 2021

== See also ==
- Metamorphosis (disambiguation)
- Metamorphoses (disambiguation)
- Metamorfosis (disambiguation)
