= Sentaku =

Sentaku may refer to:

- Choices (Buffy the Vampire Slayer), episode whose Japanese title is romanised as "Sentaku"
- "Sentaku", a chapter of the manga Suzuka
- "Sentaku", a chapter of the manga Soul Eater
- "Sentaku", an episode of the anime television series Death Note
- "Sentaku", an episode of the anime television series Nabari
- "Sentaku", an episode of the anime television series Simoun
- "Sentaku", an episode of the anime television series xxxHolic
