= Metamorfosis =

Metamorfosis may refer to:

- Metamorfosis (record label), an American record label
- Metamorfosis (Ednita Nazario album), 1992
- Metamorfosis (Vega album), 2009
- Metamorfosis, 2002 album by Cenobita
- Metamorfosis, 2017 album by Jeans (band)

== See also ==
- Metamorphosis (disambiguation)
- Metamorphoses (disambiguation)
- Metamorfosi (disambiguation)
