= 変身 =

変身 or 變身 meaning "Henshin" or "Metamorphosis", may refer to:

- Machi Action (變身), Taiwanese film directed by Giddens Ko starring Chen Bolin, Owodog and Puff Kuo, etc.
- Metamorphosis (2019 South Korean film) (변신; 變身), South Korean film
- Metamorphosis (manga) (変身), Japanese manga by ShindoL

== See also ==
- Henshin (disambiguation)
- Metamorphosis (disambiguation)
