= Metamorphism (disambiguation) =

Metamorphism, in geology, is the solid state recrystallisation of rocks under environmental forces.

Metamorphism may also refer to:

- Metamorphism (Merzbow album) (2006).
- Metamorphism (computer science), a concept similar to a hylomorphism.
- Metamorphic code, computer code that rewrites itself.
- Shapeshifting, the fictional topic, also called "metamorphism"

== See also ==
- Metamorphosis (disambiguation)
