= Martin Scherber =

German composer (1907–1974)

Martin Scherber (16 January 1907 – 10 January 1974) was a German composer and the creator of what he described as "metamorphosis symphonies".

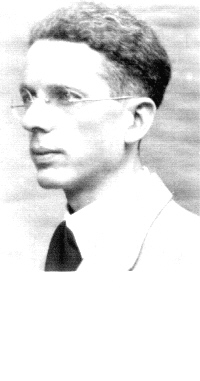
Scherber in Aussig (Ústí nad Labem) - about 1932

== Childhood and youth ==
Scherber was born as the third child of Marie and Bernhard Scherber in Nuremberg, where his father was First Bassist in the orchestra of the State Opera House. Martin was a quiet child, both alert and dreamy, always full of questions. With his great gift for everything technical, it was generally assumed he would become an engineer and for this reason he attended the secondary modern High School (Oberrealschule, today: Hans Sachs Gymnasium). But already early, at about five years of age, he began to play everything on the piano by heart. He had the absolute hearing. He didn't want to learn any notes, but after conflicts with his father he accepted them as a mean of the representation of music. Later his strength lay in improvising. He seemed to be immediately at home in music. At the age of thirteen he made his first compositions. At this time, he was having advanced piano lessons with the Nuremberg opera conductor, Karl Winkler. He made his first public appearances as a pianist in 1922. In composing and improvising he felt enwrapped in a sheet of music. He could step out of his everyday consciousness into an independent, more awake consciousness. He stepped behind the walls, as he called it. From then on he tried to find a more accurate foundation for these experiences which were at first puzzling for him.

== Education ==
Since September 1925 he attended the State Academy of Music in Munich for which he received a stipendium. At the same time he was studying philosophy. Here he also occupied himself with basic theoretical questions of knowledge, that is, the integration of an active selfconsciousness within a consciousness for the world. In accordance with his nature, this process merged totally with his artistic life. Under this double aspect his biography appears in a special light. In September 1929 he took a position as répétiteur in Aussig on the River Elbe and after a short time he became conductor and choir leader. He withdrew from the public scene in May 1933. From then on he lived as free-lance composer and music teacher again in the city of his birth.

== Metamorphosis-Symphonies ==
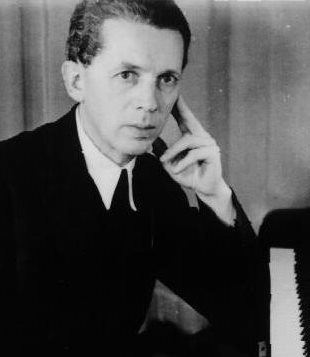
The composer of Metamorphosis-Symphonies, 1951–55.

There he created the Symphony No.1 in D minor (written in 1938). Years of experience as a soldier and prisoner of war (1940-46) in World War II affected him for a long time. Thus one may regard his 2nd Symphony in F minor (1951–1952), and 3rd Symphony in B minor (1952–1955), as a more weighty continuation of his musical path which began with the D minor Symphony. The composer called them 'Metamorphosis-Symphonies'. These symphonies are his most important compositions.

Scherber also composed instrumental music, choral works, songs and pieces for piano. Amongst these belong his "ABC" pieces, a piano cycle in which he attempts to catch the mood of German sounds of speech.

== Criticism ==
Scherber’s main compositions, dating from the 1950s onwards, have to this day hardly ever been performed and have been widely criticised as being in a very conservative post-Bruckner tonal language, at a time when the likes of Boulez and Stockhausen were writing their first important modernist works.

- "This music should be forbidden." (Hans Börnsen, 1957, after the première of the 2nd symphony, Archive of Bruckner-Kreis Nuremberg: A-BRK-N)
- "...without any musical creative power." (Bruno Walter, in a letter to the composer on 25 April 1957, about the 3rd symphony, A-BRK-N)
- "We don´t want such music." (Alfons Dressel, GMD of Nuremberg in the fifties, A-BRK-N)
- "The music is too much out of time. And the fact that it uses no appropriate conformist tone language, a language to be seriously understood today, seems to me its greatest mistake indeed, and may be a fatal one. It is an absolute anachronism." (Peter Huber, letter of 5 May 2005. A-BRK-N)
- "I find the piano pieces by Martin Scherber which I was sent very good." (Edwin Fischer, on the 'ABC Piano Pieces')
- "Thank you very much for your appreciative comments on my book 'Talks about music' [...] Your piano arrangement seems to me to be true and sensitive - and that is the best thing one can say of a piano arrangement." (Wilhelm Furtwängler - on the piano arrangement of Bruckner's Symphonies by Martin Scherber, A-BRK-N)
- "This is real music again! Let it be performed!" (Siegfried Horvath, in the fifties, to the 1st symphony, A-BRK-N)
- "...as profounnd and wide as the sea, nowhere fabricated, always interesting, never intellectual - and always alive..." (Karl Winkler, in the seventies, to the 3rd symphony, A-BRK-N)
- "The composer has radically renewed the form of the genre without making perception more difficult"[...] "All the more astonishing was Scherber's symphony for me: it is modern and at the same time not modern, it is timeless. Only a great spirit could ignore, in total command of the situation, the usual ways of 'modernizing' the musical language, and out of his own depths form a mode of expression which has nothing to do with the unmusical experiments of the century, while still sounding absolutely original." (George Balan, about the 3rd symphony, in 2004, A-BRK-N)
- "One feels one isn't listening to music any longer, but taking part in cosmic events and the mysteries of Creation." (Lilo Hammann-Rauno, in the fifties)

== Publication ==
The composer had intended to publish his symphonies only after his death. But in 1969 the idea was brought to Scherber to do it sooner. In this way the symphonies appeared in Nuremberg as immediate contributions to Albrecht-Dürer-Year 1971 (500th Anniversary of birth).

== Accident ==
At the end of May 1970, during a walk, Scherber was hit by a drunken driver and thrown through the air. As a result, he was robbed of his physical faculties to continue with his musical work, and he was unable to walk for the rest of his days. He died in early 1974 from the consequences of the accident.

== Selected works ==
- "Das ABC - Stücke für Klavier"; ABC - 31 Pieces for Piano (1938–63).
- "Hymne an die Nacht"; Hymn to the Night (1937) (Novalis; song with piano).
- Cycles of Children's Songs (1930/1937) (Clemens Brentano, Martin Scherber)
- Fairytale music (1938, 1946)
- Symphony No. 1 in D minor (1938), world premiere: 11 March 1952, Lüneburg; Conductor: Fred Thürmer
- Symphony No. 2 in F minor (1951–52), WP: 24 January 1957, Lüneburg; Conductor: Fred Thürmer
- Symphony No. 3 in B minor (1952–55), WP: 1 December 2019, Barcelona; Conductor: Christoph Schlüren
- Lieder mit Klavier (1930–1950); Songs for piano (Wilhelm Busch, J. W. von Goethe, Eduard Mörike, Christian Morgenstern)
- Choirs a capella and choirs with piano or orchestra (1937/38)

== Discography ==
- Symphony No. 3 in b-minor (3. Symphonie in h-moll durch Martin Scherber). German Philharmonic Orchestra Rhineland-Palatinate (Deutsche Staatsphilharmonie Rheinland-Pfalz), Ludwigshafen. Conductor: Elmar Lampson. Publisher: Peermusic Classical, Hamburg. Label: col legno, Wien-Salzburg, Austria, www.col-legno.com; WWE 1CD 20078. World Premiere Recording - 2001.
- Symphony No. 2 in f-minor (2. Symphonie in f-moll durch Martin Scherber). Russian Philharmonic Orchestra Moscow. Conductor: Samuel Friedmann. Publisher: Bruckner-Kreis Nürnberg. Label: Cascade Media, Staufen im Breisgau, Germany www.cascade-medien.com, Order-No. 05116. World Premiere Recording - 2010.
- Symphony No. 1 in D minor; Seven Songs on Poems by Goethe; Main Cycle of Children's Songs; Short Cycle of Children's Songs; Hymn to the Night; Various songs. Bratislava Symphony Orchestra. Conductor: Adriano (symphony) / Thomas Heyer & Hedayet Djeddikar (songs). Sterling CDS1113-2. World Premiere Recording, 2018.
