= Metamorfosi, Kilkis =

Metamorfosi Μεταμρφωση
- Settlement
- Location within Greece
- Coordinates: 41°7′6″N 22°39′38″E
- Country: Greece
- Administrative region: Central Macedonia
- Regional unit: Kilkis
- Municipality: Paionia
- Municipal unit: Polykastro
- Community: Evzonoi

Population (2021)
  - Total: 174
- Time zone: UTC+2 (EET)
  - Summer (DST): UTC+3 (EEST)
- Postal code: 612 00
- Area code: 23430
- Vehicle registration: KI

Metamorfosi (Greek: Μεταμρφωση) is a village in Kilkis regional unit of Central Macedonia, Greece. Since the 2011 local government reform it is part of the municipality Paionia. Prior to 1926, it was known by the different name of Chidemli (Greek: Τσιδεμλή).
