= Metamorphosis-Symphonies =

Metamorphosis Symphonies is the collective name for three symphonies by German composer, Martin Scherber. The first was composed before the outbreak of World War II in Nuremberg. After the war Scherber continued his musical path with the Second Symphony in F minor and the Third Symphony in B minor, which followed this directly.

They grow only from one theme. This centralizes everything with its weaving metamorphoses and gives the symphonies a breathing rhythm. "There is not simply a horizontal 'exposition' in a single voice but the 'accompanying' instruments also take up motifs and their variants" all through the symphony, "resulting in a vertical density of internal relationships."

In this way Scherber develops an organic music in constant transformation. Like Johann Wolfgang von Goethe he experienced within himself a continual metamorphosis of musical themes as result of his connection with forces of life. By discovering this he was able to change the methods of composing and gave new life to the symphony, including its formal aspects.
