= Métamorphose =

Métamorphose may refer to:

- "Métamorphose" (song), a 1989 song by Amanda Lear
- Métamorphose (album), a 1984 album by Sortilège
- Métamorphose (renamer), an open source batch renamer

== See also ==
- Metamorfoz, an album by Tarkan
- Metamorphoses (disambiguation)
