= List of Love Hina soundtracks =

Anime and manga series musical soundtrack

Love Hina is a Japanese manga series written and illustrated by Ken Akamatsu, serialized in the Weekly Shōnen Magazine from October 1998 to October 2001. A twenty-four episode anime adaptation was produced by studio Xebec and aired in Japan from April to September 2000, with three follow-up original video animation (OVA) episodes released between 2000 and 2002.

Prior to the start of the anime, several image songs were recorded by the anime cast members. Several maxi singles were released featuring some of these image songs as well as drama tracks, also performed by the anime cast. "I Love Hina" was released on April 26, 2000, and followed by Love Hina 1 on June 26, 2000, Love Hina 2 on July 26, 2000, and Love Hina 3 on August 23, 2000. Love Hina 1 came with a box to hold the other singles.

After the airing of the anime, several Love Hina soundtracks were released. The following is a list of these soundtracks and their contents:

== Soundtracks ==
=== Supplementary Soundtracks ===
==== Original Sound File ====
Love Hina Original Sound File (オリジナルサウンドファイル) was released by King Records on September 21, 2000. The catalog number for the soundtrack is KICA-523/4. The album spent two weeks on the Oricon charts, reaching position 34. The Liner notes contain lyrics for the vocal tracks and a list of all the vocal songs recorded for the series and the dates they were recorded. On the First cd, Tracks 1 to 17 are known as "The First term ~ The Daily life Section" (1−学期〜日常編〜, 1-gakki ~nichijou hen~), Tracks 18 to 31 are known as "The Second term ~ The Mental State Section" (2−学期〜心理編〜, 2-gakki ~shinri hen~), and Tracks 32 to 45 are known as "The Third term ~ The Theme Section"' (3−学期〜テーマ編〜, 3-gakki ~teema hen~). The Second cd is split into two parts, "Symphonic Part" and the "Vocal Part". Track 25 on the Second cd is a Bonus track.

All music is composed by Koichi Korenaga.

Disc 1
No.	Title	Length
1.	"Hinata Inn" (ひなた荘 Hinata-sou)	3:03
2.	"Usual Daily Life" (いつもの日常 Itsumo no nichijoi)	1:42
3.	"The World of Wild Fancies No.1 - Marriage" (妄想の世界 その1-結婚 Mousou no sekai sono 1 - Kekkon)	1:26
4.	"Chase ↔ Escape" (追跡⇔逃走 Tsuiseki ↔ Tousou)	3:32
5.	"The White Steam Bridge" (湯煙橋 Yukemuri-bashi)	1:13
6.	"Hustle" (ハッスル)	0:35
7.	"Always be Cheerful" (いつも元気で Itsumo genki de)	1:26
8.	"The World of Wild Fancies No.2 - Sasaki Seminar" (妄想の世界 その2-佐々木ゼミナール Mousou no sekai sono 2 - Sasaki Seminar)	0:34
9.	"Afternoon" (午後 Gogo)	2:25
10.	"Beautiful Sunset" (夕焼け Yuuyake)	1:14
11.	"A Suspicious Action" (怪しい行動 Ayashii koudou)	1:26
12.	"Showdown" (対決 Taiketsu)	2:49
13.	"The Outdoor Bath" (露天風呂 Roten-buro)	0:51
14.	"The World of Wild Fancies No.3 - Admitted to Tokyo University" (妄想の世界 その3-東大合格 Mousou no sekai sono 3 - toudai goukaku)	0:59
15.	"Mischief" (悪戯 Itazura)	1:38
16.	"Mufufu" (ムフフ)	1:05
17.	"And Hinata Inn as Usual" (そしていつものひなた荘 Shoshite itsumo no Hinata-sou)	1:16
18.	"Warmth" (ぬくもり Nukumori)	1:37
19.	"Turning Point" (岐路 Kiro)	0:58
20.	"Twilight" (黄昏 Tasogare)	0:38
21.	"Dead Leaves" (枯葉 Kareha)	1:10
22.	"Anxiety" (不安 Fuan)	1:01
23.	"Plot" (画策 Kakusaku)	1:41
24.	"Jealousy" (嫉妬 Shitto)	1:07
25.	"You Mean Love!?" (恋だと!? Koi dato!?)	1:20
26.	"Hesitation" (迷い Mayoi)	2:06
27.	"Broken Heart" (失恋 Shitsuren)	0:45
28.	"Silence" (静寂 Seijaku)	2:17
29.	"Childhood Days" (幼い日々 Osanai Hibi)	2:06
30.	"The Starry Sky" (星空 Hoshizora)	1:11
31.	"Determination" (決意 Ketsui)	1:15
32.	"Tama's Theme" (タマのテーマ Tama no teema)	1:07
33.	"Theme of the Senior Citizens Club" (老人会のテーマ Roujin-kai no teema)	0:45
34.	"Kaolla Mecha" (カオラ メカ)	0:50
35.	"The Country-wide Hunt" (全国探索 Zenkoku tansaku)	0:49
36.	"A Date in a Theme Park" (遊園地デート Yuuenchi date)	0:56
37.	"Subtitle" (サブタイトル)	0:09
38.	"Eyecatch" (アイキャッチ)	0:12
39.	"The Season for Graduation" (卒業の季節 Sotsugyou no kisetsu)	1:09
40.	"Game of the Legend of the Sea God's Palace" (竜宮城伝説ゲーム Ryuuguu densetsu Game)	2:07
41.	"The Prehistoric Remains Expedition" (遺跡発掘調査隊 Iseki hakkutsu chosatai)	2:25
42.	"Showdown!? The Evil Bull King" (対決!?牛魔王 Taiketsu!? Gyuumaou)	2:07
43.	""A Journey to the West" At the Beach Restaurant" (浜茶屋で西遊記 Hamajaya de saiyuuki)	1:51
44.	"Theme of Ranba" (ランバのテーマ Ranba no teema)	4:55
45.	"Theme of Moe" (モエのテーマ Moe no teema)	1:55

Disc 2
No.	Title	Writer(s)	Artist(s)	Length
1.	"Love Hina - Hinata Inn Theme" (ラブひな~ひなた荘テーマ Love Hina ~ Hinata-sou teema)	Masaki Iwamoto		2:40
2.	"Date" (デート De-to)	Iwamoto		1:50
3.	"Shadowing" (尾行 Bikou)	Iwamoto		1:13
4.	"Pathos" (哀愁 Aishuu)	Iwamoto		2:49
5.	"Real Sword" (真剣 Shinken)	Iwamoto		1:55
6.	"Deeply Moved" (感動 Kandou)	Iwamoto		3:05
7.	"Hinata Hot Spring Station" (ひなた温泉駅 Hinata Onsen eki)	Iwamoto		1:57
8.	"Tottering" (ヨロヨロ Yoroyoro)	Iwamoto		1:49
9.	"Chase" (追跡 Tsuiseki)	Iwamoto		1:50
10.	"Transformation" (変身 Henshin)	Iwamoto		1:39
11.	"Poltergeist" (ポルターガイスト Porutaagaisuto)	Iwamoto		2:01
12.	"Sorrow" (悲しみ Kanashimi)	Iwamoto		2:19
13.	"If You're Here with Me (Symphonic version)" (君さえいれば(Symphonic version)Kimi Sae Ireba (Symphonic version))	Iwamoto		1:54
14.	"Cherry Blossoms Blooming (Symphonic version)" (サクラサクれば(Symphonic version) Sakura Saku (Symphonic version))	Iwamoto		1:55
15.	"Confession" (告白 Kokuhaku)	Iwamoto		3:11
16.	"Kaolla Su's Song of Transformation - Kaolla's Theme - Amalla's Theme - Fight" (Kaolla Su Henshin no Uta ~ Kaolla no Teema - Amalla no Teema ~ Tatakai)	Iwamoto		4:53
17.	"Cheery Blossoms Blooming (on-air size)" (サクラサク(ON AIR SIZE) Sakura Saku (On Air Size))	Ritsuko Okazaki	Megumi Hayashibara	1:38
18.	"Legend of the Hot Spring Turtle" (伝説の温泉ガメ Densetsu no Onsengame)	Satomi Arimori, Hiroshi Imaizumi	Yukino Satsuki	2:48
19.	"Sweet Blue Days"	Yuuki Matsuura	Masayo Kurata, Yu Asakawa	5:20
20.	"What a Nice Hot Spring!" (いい湯だな Ii Yu Dana!)	Rokusuke Ei, Taku Izumi	Yui Horie, Masayo Kurata, Yu Asakawa, Reiko Takagi, Junko Noda	3:27
21.	"Cherry Blossoms Blooming (musical version)" (サクラサク(Musical version) Sakura Saku (Musical version))	Okazaki	Yuuji Ueda, Yui Horie, Satsuki Yukino	3:13
22.	"Liddo-kun's Adventure" (リッドくん大冒険 Lid-kun no daibouken)	Arimori	Yuuji Ueda, Yui Horie, Satsuki Yukino	2:10
23.	"If You're Not Here (on-air size)" (君さえいれば(ON AIR SIZE) Kimi Sae Ireba (on-air size))	Okazaki	Megumi Hayashibara	1:07
24.	"Smile Smile" (スマイル・スマイル)	Arimori, Hiroo Ikeda	Yui Horie, Satsuki Yukino	4:09

==== Love Hina Again ====
The Love Hina Again (オリジナルサンドラ～ラブひなAgain～) soundtrack was released by King Records on April 3, 2002. The catalog number for the album is KICA-569 and it reached number 80 on the Oricon chart. The catalog number for the album is KICA-569.

No.	Title	Writer(s)	Artist(s)	Length
1.	"My Sparkling * Treasure [Short size]" (キラリ☆宝物 Kirari Takaramono)	Itou Chika, Goshima Shou	Yui Horie	1;34
2.	"Starting from the Epilogue" (エピローグからのはじまり Epilogue kara no hajimari)			1:02
3.	"Naru's Troubles" (なるの悩み Naru no nayami)			4:31
4.	"Motoko's Look of Menace" (素子の殺気 Motoko no sakki)			1:25
5.	"Mental Agony..." (悶々…)			3:55
6.	"Farewell Party" (お別れパーティ Owakare Party)			3:51
7.	"Leave a Letter" (置手紙 Oki Tegami)			3:59
8.	"Former Ogre Slayer" (鬼殺し改)			1:40
9.	"First Promise" (最初の約束 Saisho no Yakusoku)			2:49
10.	"Then..." (そして Soshite)			1:19
11.	"Last Promise" (最初の約束 Saigo no Yakusoku)			1:37
12.	"Last Greetings" (最後の挨拶 Saigo no Aisatsu)			3:05
13.	"Be for You, Be for Me [Short size]"	Itou Chika, Goshima Shou	Yui Horie	1:04
14.	"Entering Tokyo University" (東大入学 Toudai Nyuugaku)			1:03
15.	"Sudden Farewell..." (突然の別れ… Totsuzen no Wakare...)	Shinkichi Mitsumune		1:29
16.	"Awakening of Love" (恋心 Koigokoro)	Shinkichi Mitsumune		0:54
17.	"Puzzlement" (とまどい Tomadoi)	Shinkichi Mitsumune		0:38
18.	"Carry Out a Plan" (作戦実行 Sakusen Jikkou)	Shinkichi Mitsumune		0:35
19.	"Transformation?" (変身！？ Henshin)	Shinkichi Mitsumune		0:21
20.	"Be for You, Be for Me"	Itou Chika, Goshima Shou	Yui Horie	4:37
21.	"Morning Sunshine" (朝の陽射し Asa no Hizashi)	Shinkichi Mitsumune		0:37
22.	"To an Annex" (別館へ Bekkan e)	Shinkichi Mitsumune		1:23
23.	"Place Full of Demons" (魔界 Makai)	Shinkichi Mitsumune		0:37
24.	"Confession..." (告白… Okuhaku...)	Shinkichi Mitsumune		0:53
25.	"Be for You, Be for Me [Kanako's version]"	Itou Chika, Goshima Shou	Natsuko Kuwatani	4:46
26.	"Keitaro's Dream/Naru's Dream" (景太郎の夢～なるの夢 Keitarou no Yume ~ Naru no Yume)	Shinkichi Mitsumune		1:53
27.	"Determination" (決意 Ketsui)	Shinkichi Mitsumune		1:49
28.	"Setting Sun" (沈む夕日 Shizumu Yuuhi)	Shinkichi Mitsumune		1:58
29.	"Collapse of an Annex" (別館崩壊 Bekkan Houkai)	Shinkichi Mitsumune		1:02
30.	"Denouement" (大団円 Daidanen)	Shinkichi Mitsumune		0:44
31.	"Be for You, Be for Me [Keitaro and Naru's version]"	Itou Chika, Goshima Shou	Yui Horie, Yuuji Ueda	4:07
32.	"Be for You, Be for Me [Kanako's version]" (Be for You, Be for Me ～可奈子Ver.～)	Itou Chika, Goshima Shou	Natsuko Kuwatani	1:03
33.	"Be for You, Be for Me [Keitaro & Naru's version]" (Be for You, Be for Me ～景太朗&なるVer.～)	Itou Chika, Goshima Shou	Yui Horie, Yuuji Ueda	1:03

=== Vocal compilations ===
==== Hinata Girls Song Best ====
Love Hina - Hinata Girls Song Best (ひなたガールズベストソングベスト) was the first vocal collection of the series and was released by King Records on March 16, 2001. The catalog number was KICA-533, and the album reached number 39 on the Oricon chart and stayed on the chart for 2 weeks.

No.	Title	Writer(s)	Artist(s)	Length
1.	"Because It's Spring!" (春だもの! Haru da Mono!)	Ritsuko Okazaki	Yui Horie, Masayo Kurata, Satsuki Yukino	3:35
2.	"Sakura Saku" (サクラサク)	Ritsuko Okazaki	Megumi Hayashibara	3:10
3.	"Smile Smile [Version 2001]" (スマイルスマイル(ヴァージョン・2001))	Satomi Arimori, Hiroo Ikeda	Yui Horie, Satsuki Yukino	4:05
4.	"I'm Fine Everyday" (毎日がお天気 Mainichi ga Otenki)	Satomi Arimori, Shinichi Sakurai	Yui Horie	3:41
5.	"Shinobu's Diary of Duties" (しのぶの当番日誌 Shinobu no Touban Nisshi)	Kanon Kuwa, Miki Yoshinaka	Masayo Kurata	3:23
6.	"Like the Moon" (月の如く Tsuki no Gotoku)	Satomi Arimori, Hiroshi Uesugi	Yuu Asakawa	3:58
7.	"Wow Wow at Heart" (HEARTはWow Wow Heart wa Wow Wow)	Satomi Arimori, Yukari Oguma	Reiko Takagi	4:36
8.	"You Know, I Don't Have an Umbrella" (傘がないのよ Kasa ga Nai no yo)	Tetsuo Kudou, Shou Goshima	Noda Junko	3:47
9.	"How Wonderful!" (なんてステキな Nante Suteki na)	Ritsuko Okazaki	Satsuki Yukino	5:14
10.	"Stop! Stop!" (ダメダメ!! Dame Dame)	Satomi Arimori, Takashi Mori	Yumiko Kobayashi	3:27
11.	"Sweet Blue Days [Greenhorn version]" (Sweet blue days(グリーンホーン・ヴァージョン))	Yuuki Matsuura	Masayo Kurata, Yu Asakawa	5:19
12.	"If Only You're with Me" (君さえいれば Kimi Sae Ireba)	Ritsuko Okazaki	Megumi Hayashibara	4:09
13.	"Gifts for the Future" (未来への贈り物 Mirai e no Okurimono)	Ritsuko Okazaki	Yui Horie, Masayo Kurata, Yu Asakawa, Reiko Takagi, Junko Noda, Satsuki Yukino, Yumiko Kobayashi	5:05
14.	"The Beginning Starts Now" (はじまりはここから Hajimari wa Kokokara)	Ritsuko Okazaki	Ritsuko Okazaki	3:24

==== Hinata Girls Song Best 2 ====
Love Hina - Hinata Girls Song Best 2 (ひなたガールズベストソングベスト2) was released by King Records on October 3, 2001. The catalog number was KICA-557 and the album reached number 40 on the Oricon chart.

No.	Title	Writer(s)	Artist(s)	Length
1.	"As Long as and as Far as It Takes" (Itsumademo Dokomademo)	Ritsuko Okazaki	Yui Horie, Masayo Kurata, Yu Asakawa, Reiko Takagi, Junko Noda, Satsuki Yukino, Yumiko Kobayashi	4:08
2.	"Cherry Blossoms Blooming [Musical version]" (Sakura Saku [Musical Version])	Ritsuko Okazaki	Yuji Ueda, Yui Horie, Satsuki Yukino	3:13
3.	"Promise" (Yakusoku)	Satomi Arimori, Shun Yamashita	Yui Horie	4:43
4.	"Smile for You"	Youko Negishi, Ritsuko Miyashima	Masayo Kurata	5:46
5.	"Energy Love Tomboys" (Baribari Otenba)	Kanon Kuwa, Masashi Chizawa	Reiko Takagi, Yumiko Kobayashi	3:19
6.	"A Real Sword" (Shinken)	Keiko Kimoto, Toshiaki Yamazaki	Yuu Asakawa	4:17
7.	"Feeling Like La Moon" (RaMoon na Kibunde)	Tetsuo Kudou, Matomo	Junko Noda	3:54
8.	"Heat Up Up Girl"	Kanon Kura, Eri Sugai	Reiko Takagi	4:24
9.	"It's an Outrageous Carnival at Heart" (Kokoro wa Hachahacha Cannibal)	Yukie Oazaki, Yuka Hiroi	Masayo Kurata, Reiko Takagi, Yumiko Kobayashi	3:46
10.	"Love Labyrinth"	Satomi Arimori, Sora Izumikawa	Yui Horie, Yu Asakawa, Satsuki Yukino, Noda Junko	4:12
11.	"Blessing" (Shukufuku)	Ritsuko Okazaki	Yui Horie, Masayo Kurata, Yu Asakawa, Reiko Takagi, Junko Noda, Satsuki Yukino, Yumiko Kobayashi	3:32
12.	"To the Future with a Smile" (Egao no Mirai E)	Satomi Arimori, Takahiro Furuike	Yui Horie	4:53
13.	"Friendship"	Ritsuko Okazaki	Yui Horie, Masayo Kurata, Yu Asakawa, Reiko Takagi, Junko Noda, Satsuki Yukino, Yumiko Kobayashi	5:33

=== Other soundtracks, singles, etc. ===
These soundtracks are also implemented from the anime Love Hina, although these albums will be available through digital distribution.
