= List of Elfen Lied chapters =

Japanese manga series

First tankōbon volume cover, released by Shueisha on October 18, 2002

Elfen Lied is a Japanese manga series written and illustrated by Lynn Okamoto. It was serialized in Shueisha's seinen manga magazine Weekly Young Jump from 2002 to 2005. The series' 107 chapters were also published in twelve tankōbon volumes by Shueisha from October 18, 2002, through November 18, 2005.

On July 4, 2018, Dark Horse Comics announced that it has licensed the manga for a North American release, and they released it in four omnibus volumes (three volumes per omnibus), from May 22, 2019, through September 9, 2020.

== Volumes ==
No.	Original release date	Original ISBN	English release date	English ISBN
1	October 18, 2002	978-4-08-876358-3	May 22, 2019	978-1-5067-1173-7
EL01. "Elf" (妖精, Yōsei); EL02. "Nyu" (にゅう, Nyū); EL03. "SAT" (SATの男, SAT no otoko); EL04. "Loss of Memory" (記憶の消失, Kioku no shōshitsu); EL05. "Self-defense" (改防, Aratame bō); EL06. "Transformation" (変身, Henshin); EL07. "Destination"; Special: "MOL"
2	December 11, 2002	978-4-08-876379-8	May 22, 2019	978-1-5067-1173-7
EL08. "Yuka's Memories" (ユカの思い出, Yuka no omoide); EL09. "Lost Memories" (失われた記憶, Ushinawareta kioku); EL10. "A Sudden Visitor" (突然の訪問者, Totsuzen no hōmon-sha); EL11. "Female Visitor" (訪問少女, Hōmon shōjo); EL12. "Messenger" (使者, Shisha); EL13. "One Shot" (一発, Ippatsu); EL14. "Clash"; EL15. "Reinforcements" (援軍, Engun); EL16. "Thus the Girl Died" (そして少女は死んだ, Soshite shōjo wa shinda); EL17. "Father of a New Race" (新人種の父, Shin jinshu no chichi); Special: "Digitopolis" (デジトポリス, Dejitoporis)
3	February 19, 2003	978-4-08-876406-1	May 22, 2019	978-1-5067-1173-7
EL18. "The Girl's Past" (女の過去, On'na no kako); EL19. "Living Together" (同居人, Dōkyo hito); EL20. "Meet Again" (再会, Saikai); EL21. "Progeny" (子孫, Shison); EL22. "Prosperity of Death"; EL23. "Teacher of Horns"; EL24. "Nyu's House Arrest" (にゅう軟禁, Nyū nankin); EL25. "Ditched" (溝, Mizo); EL26. "Lebensborn" (ルーベンスボルン, Rūbensuborun); EL27. "The One Who Has Freedom"; Special: "Memoria" (メモリア)
4	May 19, 2003	978-4-08-876446-7	September 25, 2019	978-1-5067-1174-4
EL28. "Modification Surgery" (改造手術, Kaizō shujutsu); EL29. "Connection" (つながり, Tsunagari); EL30. "Knot" (結び目, Musubime); EL31. "Detection" (発覚, Hakkaku); EL32. "Nyuu's Past" (にゅうの過去, Nyū no kako); EL33. "Promise" (約束, Yakusoku); EL34. "Scream" (叫び, Sakebi); EL35. "Lies" (lies); EL36. "Whisper" (ささやき, Sasayaki); EL37. "Kanae" (カナエ); EL38. "Flashback" (フラッシュバック, Furasshu bakku)
5	August 19, 2003	978-4-08-876477-1	September 25, 2019	978-1-5067-1174-4
EL39. "Disposal Order" (処刑命令, Shokei meirei); EL40. "Parting"; EL41. "Attack Pretext"; EL42. "On The Run With Common Front"; EL43. "What Shan't Be Seen" (見ではいけないもの, Mide wa ikenai mono); EL44. "Peeing" (おもらし, Omorashi); EL45. "Hide and Seek" (かくれんぼ, Kakurenbo); EL46. "The Project" (プロジェクト, Purojekuto); EL47. "Contact" (接触, Sesshoku); EL48. "Panic in Maple Inn"; Special: "Elfen Lied" (エルフェンリート)
6	November 19, 2003	978-4-08-876513-6	September 25, 2019	978-1-5067-1174-4
EL49. "Unforeseen" (予想外, Yosō-gai); EL50. "Copying Kanae" (カナエ倣, Kanae-hō); EL51. "Tears" (涙, Namida); EL52. "Kurama's Daughter" (蔵間の娘, Kurama no musume); EL53. "Ways, Choices" (手段と選択, Shudan to sentaku); EL54. "Sand Castles"; EL55. "Mariko" (MARIKO); EL56. "Girl's Fun" (少女の遊び, Shōjo no asobi); EL57. "Papa for Two" (二人のパパ, Futari no papa); EL58. "Lab's White Walls"; EL59. "Tests on the Living"; EL60. "The Annunciation" (受胎告知, Jutai kokuchi)
7	March 19, 2004	978-4-08-876579-2	January 29, 2020	978-1-5067-1175-1
EL61. "Final Choice" (究極の選択, Kyūkyoku no sentaku); EL62. "Deeply Held Resentment"; EL63. "Grin"; EL64. "Blaze of Glory"; EL65. "Midway to Heaven" (天国の途中, Tengoku no tochū); EL66. "Humanity's Fall" (人類の滅亡, Jinrui no metsubō); EL67. "Backup Measure"; EL68. "The Heart and the Uterus" (心臓または子宮, Shinzō matawa shikyū); EL69. "Isolation" (隔絶, Kakuzetsu); EL70. "Heartbreak" (断腸, Danchō); EL71. "Hope for Tomorrow" (明日への希望, Ashita e no kibō)
8	July 16, 2004	978-4-08-876638-6	January 29, 2020	978-1-5067-1175-1
EL72. "Anna" (アンナ, An'na); EL73. "What Are You Searching For?" (探しものはなんですか?, Sagashi mono wa nandesu ka?); EL74. "God of Death" (死神, Shinigami); EL75. "Animal Scent" (獣臭, Jūshū); Special 1: "Another happy future" (もうひとつの幸せな未来, "Mouhitotsu Shiawasena Mirai"); Special 2: "Does sake make one drink or make one drunk?" (酒は呑むほう呑まれるほう?)
9	October 19, 2004	978-4-08-876696-6	January 29, 2020	978-1-5067-1175-1
EL76. "An Unachieveable Retribution"; EL77. "Can Life Merely Be Despair?"; EL78. "Boy Meets Girl" (ボーイ・ミーツ・ガール, Bōi mītsu gāru); EL79. "Helpless" (Helpless); EL80. "My Creations" (僕の作品, Boku no sakuhin); EL81. "Transmission" (伝達, Dentatsu); EL82. "Outcome" (合否, Gōhi)
10	March 18, 2005	978-4-08-876764-2	September 9, 2020	978-1-5067-1176-8
EL83. "Reminiscence"; EL84. "Broken Angel" (こはれた天使, Kowareta tenshi); EL85. "Family" (FAMILY); EL86. "The Insincere Night Sky" (不実な夜空, Fujitsuna yozora); EL87. "The Palm" (テノヒラ, Tenohira)
11	August 19, 2005	978-4-08-876838-0	September 9, 2020	978-1-5067-1176-8
EL88. "Memories and Gunshots" (記憶と銃声, Kioku to jūsei); EL89. "Death Maze"; EL90. "Unforeseen" (予想外, Yosō-gai); EL91. "Stupidity" (間抜け, Manuke); EL92. "Bewilderment and the Sea"; EL93. "Lack Communication"; EL94. "The Researcher's Pride"; EL95. "Tear Shed for the Other"; EL96. "Everyone's Hell" (それぞれの地獄, Sorezore no jigoku); EL97. "Dawn of the Long Night" (長い夜の夜明け, Nagaiyo no yoake)
12	November 18, 2005	978-4-08-876884-7	September 9, 2020	978-1-5067-1176-8
EL98. "The Ocean to the Past"; EL99. "Memories That Cannot Be Killed" (思い出は殺せない, Omoide wa korosenai); EL100. "Wish on a Star" (願い星, Negai hoshi); EL101. "Light of Death" (生命の灯, Seimei no akari); EL102. "Center and Fringe" (中心と周縁, Chūshin to shūen); EL103. "The Elf Sings" (妖精は歌う, Yōsei wa utau); EL104. "The End of a Dream" (夢の終わり, Yume no owari); EL105. "Why" (どうして, Dōshite); EL106. "If Someday" (もしいつか, Moshi itsuka); EL107. "Conclusion" (大団円, Daidan'en)
