= List of Arata: The Legend chapters =

Cover of the first tankōbon volume of Arata: The Legend (left), released on January 16, 2009, and cover of the first volume of the Remaster edition, released on July 18, 2013

Written and illustrated by Yuu Watase, chapters of Arata: The Legend has been serialized in Shogakukan's Weekly Shōnen Sunday magazine since October 2008. Shogakukan collected its chapters into twenty-four individual tankōbon volumes, published from January 16, 2009, to September 18, 2015. Shogakukan started re-releasing the series in a two-in-one volume Remaster edition", which includes the original color page chapters from the magazine and various other modifications. The first volume was released on July 18, 2013. On May 14, 2021, Watase wrote on her blog that the tankōbon edition of the series would not continue being published and the series will only continue with the Remaster edition. The eighteenth and last volume was released on December 18, 2023.

The manga is licensed for English release in North America by Viz Media, as part of their Shonen Sunday imprint. The first volume was released on March 9, 2010. The 24th and last volume of the tankōbon edition was released on August 9, 2016.

== Volume list ==
=== Tankōbon edition ===
No.	Original release date	Original ISBN	English release date	English ISBN
1	January 16, 2009	978-4-09-121579-6	March 9, 2010	1-4215-3420-7
01. "Revolution" (革命, Kakumei); 02. "Friends" (友達, Tomodachi); 03. "Arata & Arata" (革とアラタ, Arata to Arata); 04. "Hayagami" (劍神, Hayagami); 05. "Sho" (鞘, Sho); 06. "Trial" (裁判, Saiban); 07. "Determination" (決意, Ketsui)
2	March 18, 2009	978-4-09-121629-8	June 8, 2010	1-4215-3421-5
08. "Gatoya" (ガトヤ, Gatoya); 09. "Uneme" (ウネメ, Uneme); 10. "The Search" (探索, Tansaku); 11. "Kanate & Ginchi" (カナデとギンチ, Kanate to Ginchi); 12. "The Ring" (指輪, Yubiwa); 13. "The Reckoning" (審判, Shinpan); 14. "Total Strangers" (赤の他人, Aka no Tanin); 15. "Kamui" (神意, Kamui); 16. "Awakening" (覚醒, Kakusei); 17. "The Great Shinshou" (偉大なる神鞘, Idai Naru Shinshō)
3	June 28, 2009	978-4-09-122020-2	September 14, 2010	1-4215-3422-3
18. "School" (学校, Gakkō); 19. "Parting" (別れ, Wakare); 20. "Kagutsuchi" (カグツチ, Kagutsuchi); 21. "Zokusho" (属鞘, Zokushō); 22. "Akachi" (赫血, Akachi); 23. "Behind the Curtain" (帳の向こう, Tobari no Mukō); 24. "Clash" (激突, Gekitotsu); 25. "Submission" (降し合い, Kudashi Ai); 26. "Successor" (後継者, Kōkeisha); 27. "Shikuyo" (創世, Sōsei)
4	September 17, 2009	978-4-09-121749-3	December 14, 2010	1-4215-3423-1
28. "The Pain In My Chest" (胸の痛み, Mune no Itami); 29. "In The Flames" (炎の中, Honoo no Naka); 30. "Emisu" (エミス, Emisu); 31. "Kadowaki 1" (カドワキ（前）, Kadowaki (Mae)); 32. "Kadowaki 2" (カドワキ（後）, Kadowaki (Ato)); 33. "Yorunami's Territory" (ヨルナミ領, Yorunami Ryō); 34. "The Island of the Children" (子供の島, Kodomo no Shima); 35. "The Invisible Shou" (見えない鞘, Mienai Shou); 36. "The Adults" (オトナ, Otona); 37. "Nagu and Naru" (ナグとナル, Nagu to Naru)
5	December 28, 2009	978-4-09-122044-8	March 8, 2011	1-4215-3846-6
38. "Thank You" (ありがとう, Arigatō); 39. "Omen" (予兆, Yochō); 40. "Who Are You?" (誰？, Dare?); 41. "Starting Over" (改めて, Aratame Te); 42. "Change" (変化, Henka); 43. "The Inner Six Shou" (六ノ鞘, Roku no Shou); 44. "A Bad Premonition" (嫌な予感, Iyana Yokan); 45. "Resonance" (共鳴, Kyōmei); 46. "Chosen People" (選ばれた人間, Eraba Reta Ningen); 47. "Orochi" (逐力, Orochi)
6	March 19, 2010	978-4-09-122192-6	June 14, 2011	1-4215-3847-4
48. "Reunion" (再会, Saikai); 49. "Demon" (鬼, Oni); 50. "Promise" (約束, Yakusoku); 51. "An Amazing Guy" (スゲェ奴, Sugee Yatsu); 52. "Harunawa" (ハルナワ, Harunawa); 53. "Suzukura" (スズクラ, Suzukura); 54. "Hiruko-Sama" (ヒルコ様, Hiruko-sama); 55. "True Identity" (正体, Shōtai); 56. "The Truth Is..." (ホントは…, Honto wa...); 57. "Hiruko's Bet" (ヒルコの賭, Hiruko no Kake)
7	June 18, 2010	978-4-09-122332-6	September 13, 2011	1-4215-3981-0
58. "Yorunami" (ヨルナミ, Yorunami); 59. "Showdown" (対決, Taiketsu); 60. "Time Reversal Jutsu" (トキカエシノジュツ, Tokikaeshi no Jutsu); 61. "Mother's Soul" (ハカノミタマ, Haka no Mitama); 62. "Entrust Completely" (スベテヲタクシテ, Subete o Takushite); 63. "Declaration of War" (センセンフコク, Sensenhukoku); 64. "Suguru" (スグル, Suguru); 65. "Revenge" (カタキ, Kataki); 66. "With All My Strength" (ゼンリョクデ, Zenryokude); 67. "Wound of the Heart" (ココロノキズ, Kokoro no Kizu)
8	September 17, 2010	978-4-09-122523-8	December 13, 2011	978-1-4215-3982-9
68. "Kasefuno" (カセフノ, Kasefuno); 69. "Mikusa" (ミクサ, Mikusa); 70. "The Zokusho of Happuujin" (「八風陣」の属鞘, `Happū-jin' no Zoku Saya); 71. "Powerless" (無力, Muryoku); 72. "Lifespan" (寿命, Jumyō); 73. "Because We Are Friends" (友達だから, Tomodachi Dakara); 74. "Tribute" (貢ぎ物, Mitsugimono); 75. "Kagura's Palace" (クグラの宮, Kugura no Miya); 76. "Transformation" (変身, Henshin); 77. "Grown Up" (大人の男, Otona no Otoko)
9	December 17, 2010	978-4-09-122696-9	March 6, 2012	978-1-4215-4075-7
78. "An Intrusion" (乱入, Ran'nyū); 79. "Eto" (エト, Eto); 80. "Brothers" (兄弟, Kyōdai); 81. "A Warm Breeze" (あたたかな風, Atataka na Kaze); 82. "Light" (光, Hikari); 83. "The Emperor of Hinowa" (日輪の大王, Nichirin no Daiō); 84. "Anii" (兄ィ, Ani); 85. "The Village" (里, Sato); 86. "The Legend" (言い伝え, Iitsutae); 87. "The Answer" (答え, Kotae)
10	March 18, 2011	978-4-09-122795-9	June 12, 2012	978-1-4215-4147-1
88. "Yataka" (ヤタカ, Yataka); 89. "The Melting Pot of Spirits" (魂銷のるつぼ, Tamashī Saya Norutsu Bo); 90. "Hooray For Teko!?" (テコ万歳！？, Teko Banzai!?); 91. "Teko's Will Power" (テコ(革)の意地, Teko no Iji); 92. "Too Complicated" (余計ややこしく…, Yokei Yayakoshiku…); 93. "Yataka's Proposition" (ヤタカの提案, Yataka no Teian); 94. "The Reason A Gentleman Fight" (理性との戦い, Risei to no Tatakai); 95. "So Called 'Love'" (「愛」って…, `Ai' tte…); 96. "Heart" (秘女王の「心」, Himeō no `Kokoro'); 97. "Yataka's Kamui" (ヤタカの神意, Yataka no Shin'i)
11	June 17, 2011	978-4-09-122899-4	September 11, 2012	978-1-4215-4246-1
98. "Yataka's Memory" (ヤタカの記憶, Yataka no Kioku); 99. "This isn't the end" (終わりじゃない, Owari Janai); 100. "Yataka's feelings" (ヤタカの想い, Yataka no Omoi); 101. "Make me submit!!" (僕を降したまえ！！, Boku o Kudashi Tamae!!); 102. "Only "women"..." (「女」だけ…, `On'na' Dake…); 103. "Harunawa's aim" (ハルナワの狙い, Harunawa no Nerai); 104. "A new mystery" (新たな謎, Aratana Nazo); 105. "Some kind of weapon" (なにか武器は, Nanika Buki wa); 106. "Two old acquaintances" (幼なじみの2人, Osananajimi no 2-ri); 107. "Kadowaki's proposal" (カドワキの提案, Kadowaki no Teian)
12	August 18, 2011	978-4-09-123219-9	December 4, 2012	978-1-4215-4270-6
108. "I can't lose" (勝てない理由, Katenai Riyū); 109. "Kannagi's sentiments" (カンナギの心情, Kan'nagi no Shinjō); 110. "The pilgrims" (巡礼者たち, Junrei-sha-tachi); 111. "The mystery of the fallen Arata" (倒れた革の謎, Taoreta Kawa no Nazo); 112. "Akachi's Past" (アカチの過去, Akachi no Kako); 113. "A Sorrowful 50 Feet" (哀しき50尺, Kanashiki 50-shaku); 114. "A Desperate Apology" (必死の謝罪, Hisshi no Shazai); 115. "Yataka's Fight" (ヤタカの戦い, Yataka no Tatakai); 116. "My Pain" (俺の苦しみ, Ore no Kurushimi); 117. "Each One's Pain" (それぞれの苦しみ, Sorezore no Kurushimi)
13	November 18, 2011	978-4-09-123386-8	March 12, 2013	978-1-4215-4333-8
118. "Kannagi's Feelings" (カンナギの想い, Kan'nagi no Omoi); 119. "The Reason for Fighting" (戦う理由(ワケ), Tatakau Wake); 120. "Kadowaki's Feelings" (門脇の思い, Kadowaki no Omoi); 121. "With no place to run" (逃げ場なしで, Nigeba Nashide); 122. "A Sad Fate" (悲しき運命(さだめ), Kanashiki Sadame); 123. "A Gentle Friend" (優しき友, Yasashiki Tomo); 124. "What Akachi Left Behind" (アカチが残したモノ, Akachi ga Nokoshita Mono); 125. "Orochi's True Form" (逐力の進化, Orochi no Shinka); 126. "Hiruha's Dream" (ヒルハの夢, Hiruha no Yume); 127. "Hiruha's Wish" (ヒルハの願い, Hiruha no Negai)
14	February 17, 2012	978-4-09-123547-3	June 11, 2013	978-1-4215-5156-2
128. "What Happened 52 Years Ago" (52年前の出来事, 52-nen Mae no Dekigoto); 129. "The Thing '52 Years Ago'" (「52年前」のこと, 52-nen Mae' no Koto); 130. "Wailing of the 'Wind'" (「風」の慟哭, `Kaze' no Dōkoku); 131. "The 'Soul' of People" (人の「生命」, Hito no `Seimei'); 132. "The Power of Kamui" (神意の力, Shin'i no Chikara); 133. "Life" (命, Inochi); 134. "The One Who Instigated Sata" (サタをたきつけたのは…, Sata o Takitsuketa no wa…); 135. "It's Not Power..." (力ではなくて…」感想, Chikarade Wanakute…' Kansō); 136. "Parting" (別離, Betsuri); 137. "Mikusa's Determination" (ミクサの決意, Mikusa no Ketsui)
15	May 18, 2012	978-4-09-123660-9	September 10, 2013	978-1-4215-5162-3
138. "Toward a New Self" (新しい自分へ, Atarashī Jibun e); 139. "Shadow" (影, Kage); 140. "I Can Do It Too!" (私にもできる！, Watashi ni mo Dekiru!); 141. "For Arata's Sake" (革のために, Kawa no Tame ni); 142. "Realization" (気づき, Kidzuki); 143. "Enter Saruta!!" (サルタ登場, Saruta Tōjō); 144. "The Truth About Hayagami" (劍神の真実, Hayagami no Shinjitsu); 145. "Three Techniques" (3つの技, 3-tsu no Waza); 146. "Orochi" (逐力, Orochi); 147. "A True Friend" (本当の「友達」, Hontō no 'Tomodachi')
16	August 17, 2012	978-4-09-123796-5	December 10, 2013	978-1-4215-5380-1
148. "Stange Sound" (不思議な音, Fushigina Oto); 149. "The Sound of The Flute" (笛の音, Fue no ne); 150. "5 Musical Instruments" (5つの楽器, Itsutsu no Gakki); 151. "Rebellious Attributes" (反する属性, Hansuru Zokusei); 152. "The Power of Ne" (聴通音の力, Akira-tsū-on no Chikara); 153. "Send Back to the Sound" (音色返し, Neiro-gaeshi); 154. "On The Signal" (合図と共に, Aizu to Tomoni); 155. "Tagiri's Roar" (タギリの咆哮, Tagiri no Hōkō); 156. "Before the Demonization" (鬼化寸前, Oni-ka Sunzen); 157. "The Sound of 100" (100人の音, 100-ri no Oto)
17	December 18, 2012	978-4-09-124036-1	March 11, 2014	978-1-4215-5876-9
158. "The People's Performance" (民の演奏, Min no Ensō); 159. "Demonization" (鬼化, Oni-ka); 160. "Another Transformation" (次なる形, Tsuginaru Katachi); 161. "Voices in Unison" (声を揃えて, Koe o Soroete); 162. "Kikutsune's Past" (キクツネの過去, Kikutsune no Kako); 163. "Under the Volcano" (噴火の下で, Funka no Shita de); 164. "Voices of Joy" (歓喜の声, Kanki no Koe); 165. "Summer in Nippon" (日本は夏, Nihon wa Natsu); 166. "To Oninaki Island" (鬼哭島にて, Kikokutō Nite); 167. "Harunawa's Nails" (ハルナワの爪, Harunawa no Tsume)
18	March 18, 2013	978-4-09-124197-9	June 10, 2014	978-1-4215-6505-7
168. "The Doomed Point" (投鬼岬, Tō Oni Misaki); 169. "The Rock and the Memories" (岩と記憶, Iwa to Kioku); 170. "The Demon's World" (鬼のすむ世界, Oni no Sumu Sekai); 171. "Choosing the Right Path" (とるべき道, Torubeki Michi); 172. "Back to the Original World" (元の世界に, Moto no Sekai Ni); 173. "The Power of Character" (文字の力, Moji no Chikara); 174. "Truthful Worlds" (本音の言葉, Hon'ne no Kotoba); 175. "Character from a Different World" (異世界の文字, Isekai no Moji); 176. "Isora's Town" (イソラの街, Isora no Machi); 177. "Labyrinth of Character" (文字の迷宮, Moji no Meikyū)
19	May 17, 2013	978-4-09-124300-3	September 9, 2014	978-1-4215-6506-4
178. "Two Words" (二つの言葉, Futatsu no Kotoba); 179. "A Question" (問いかけ, Toikake); 180. "Answer" (答え, Kotae); 181. "Trust" (信頼, Shinrai); 182. "Fight" (共闘, Kyōtō); 183. "Betrayal" (裏切り, Uragiri); 184. "Onigami" (鬼神, Onigami); 185. "Only One Enemy" (ただ一人の敵, Tada Hitori no Teki); 186. "The Devil's Confession" (悪魔の告白, Akuma no Kokohaku); 187. "Release" (解放, Kaihō)
20	July 18, 2013	978-4-09-124347-8	December 9, 2014	978-1-4215-6640-5
188. "Awareness" (気付き, Kidzuki); 189. "Mark" (印, Shirushi); 190. "The World Where Hinohara Was..." (ヒノハラのいた世界..., Hinohara no Ita Sekai...); 191. "Entrance" (入り口, Iriguchi); 192. "Fighting Power" (戦う力, Tatakau Chikara); 193. "Progress" (前進, Zenshin); 194. "Please" (お願い, Onegai); 195. "The Sea Region Ubi" (ウビ海域, Ubi Kaiiki); 196. "Smell" (匂い, Nioi); 197. "Ikisu's Island" (イキスの島, Ikisu no Shima)
21	October 18, 2013	978-4-09-124458-1	March 10, 2015	978-1-4215-6781-5
198. "Hostility" (敵対, Tekitai); 199. "In the Chest" (胸中, Kyochu); 200. "Shout" (叫び, Sakebi); 201. "Sprint" (疾走, Shissō); 202. "Wind" (風, Kaze); 203. "Loss" (喪失, Sōshitsu); 204. "Rampage" (暴走, Bōsō); 205. "I Have to Stop" (止めなきゃ, Tomenakya); 206. "Shock" (衝撃, Shogeki); 207. "The Town" (街ヘ, Machi he)
22	December 18, 2013	978-4-09-124515-1	June 9, 2015	978-1-4215-7904-7
208. "Air Raid" (空襲, Kūshū); 209. "Regeneration" (再生, Saisei); 210. "Demon and Demon" (鬼と鬼, Oni to Oni); 211. "Armor" (鎧, Yoroi); 212. "Despair" (絶望, Zetsubou); 213. "Absolutely..." (絶対..., Zettai...); 214. "Conversion" (転換, Tenkan); 215. "Secondary Damage" (二次被害, Nijihigai); 216. "Under One Roof" (一つ屋根の下, Hitotsuyane no Shita); 217. "Tag" (鬼ごっこ, Onigokko)
23	October 18, 2014	978-4-09-124581-6	September 8, 2015	978-1-4215-7905-4
218. "The Human Heart" (人の心, Hito no Kokoro); 219. "Hurt" (傷, Kizu); 220. "Not a Sho" (鞘じゃない自分, Sho Janai Jibun); 221. "Chiwaya" (チワヤ, Chiwaya); 222. "City of Sand" (砂の街, Suna no Machi); 223. "Breakthrough" (突破, Toppa); 224. "Long Way Off" (遠い道程, Tooi Michinori); 225. "After So Long" (今更, Imasara); 226. "Victory or Defeat" (勝負, Shōbu); 227. "Past and Present" (過去と今, Kako to Ima)
24	September 18, 2015	978-4-09-126287-5	August 9, 2016	978-1-4215-8709-7
228. "Father and Son" (父と子, Chichi to Ko); 229. "War" (戦争, Sensō); 230. "Warmth" (温もり, Nukumori); 231. "Defeat" (敗北, Haiboku); 232. "Shimu" (シム); 233. "Surgery" (手術, Shujutsu); 234. "Monster" (怪物, Kaibutsu); 235. "Father" (父さん, Tosan); 236. "Calamity Expands" (惨禍拡大, Sanka Kakudai); 237. "The Room" (部屋, Heya)

=== Remaster edition ===
Note: The Remaster edition includes more chapters than the tankōbon edition, therefore, the numbering of the Remaster edition do not entirely match with the numbering of the tankōbon edition. For example: chapters 208 and 226 of the tankōbon edition were numbered 226 and 243, respectively, in the Remaster edition. In 2021, chapters 227–237 of the tankōbon edition and chapters 238–240, were republished in Weekly Shōnen Sunday, numbered as 244–257.

No.	Japanese release date	Japanese ISBN
1	July 18, 2013	978-4-09-124399-7
Chapters 1–17
2	September 18, 2013	978-4-09-124411-6
Chapters 18–38
3	April 18, 2014	978-4-09-124688-2
Chapters 39–57
4	October 17, 2014	978-4-09-125480-1
Chapters 58–76
5	January 16, 2015	978-4-09-125717-8
Chapters 77–96
6	September 18, 2015	978-4-09-126409-1
Chapters 97–114
7	June 17, 2016	978-4-09-127269-0
Chapters 115–133
8	June 16, 2017	978-4-09-127646-9
Chapters 134–150
9	April 18, 2018	978-4-09-128199-9
Chapters 151–168
10	November 16, 2018	978-4-09-128717-5
Chapters 169–187
11	May 17, 2019	978-4-09-129226-1
Chapters 188–207
12	November 18, 2019	978-4-09-129499-9
Chapters 208–225
13	May 18, 2021	978-4-09-850606-4
Chapters 226–243
14	October 18, 2021	978-4-09-850748-1
244. "Past and Present" (過去と今, Kako to Ima); 245. "Father and Son" (父と子, Chichi to Ko); 246. "War" (戦争, Sensō); 247. "Warmth" (温もり, Nukumori); 248. "Defeat" (敗北, Haiboku); 249. "Shimu" (シム); 250. "Surgery" (手術, Shujutsu); 251. "Monster" (怪物, Kaibutsu); 252. "Father" (父さん, Tosan); 253. "Calamity Expands" (惨禍拡大, Sanka Kakudai); 254. "The Room" (部屋, Heya); 255. "Crime and Punishment" (罪と罰, Tsumi to Bachi) (Note: First published in 2015 (numbered 238).); 256. "Brain" (脳, Nō) (Note: First published in 2015 (numbered 239).); 257. "As a Father" (父として, Chichi to Shite) (Note: First published in 2015 (numbered 240).); 258. "Separation" (別離, Betsuri); 259. "Departure" (出発, Shuppatsu); 260. "Rebellion" (反乱, Hanran); 261. "Protective" (お護り, Omamori); 262. "Family" (家族, Kazoku)
15	April 18, 2022	978-4-09-851142-6
263. "Surrender" (投降, Tōkō); 264. "Blue Flower" (青い花, Aoi Hana); 265. "Approaching" (接近, Sekkin); 266. "Encounter" (邂逅, Kaigō); 267. "New Army" (新国軍, Shin Kokugun); 268. "Military School" (兵学校, Hei Gakkō); 269. "Speech" (演説, Enzetsu); 270. "Marriage Necklace" (婚姻の首飾り, Konin no Kubikazari); 271. "Brainwashing" (洗脳, Sen'nō); 272. "Causal Retribution " (因果応報, Ingaōhō); 273. "Zamāmiro" (ザマアミロ); 274. "Medical Building" (医療棟, Iryō-tō); 275. "Start" (始動, Shidō); 276. "Kunikuru" (クニクル); 277. "Akachi's Teachings" (アカチの教え, Akachi no Oshie); 278. "Hyperpnea" (過呼吸, Kakokyū); 279. "Waka" (ワカ); 280. "Team Leader Order" (班長命令, Hanchō Meirei); 281. "Air Force" (空察部隊, Sora Sabbutai); 282. "Connection" (つながり, Tsunagari)
16	September 15, 2022	978-4-09-851361-1
283. "Taema" (タエマ); 284. "Uneme Dormitory" (采女寮, Uneme Ryō); 285. "Training Punishment" (修練懲罰, Shūren Chōbatsu); 286. "Class and Lynching" (授業と私刑, Jugyō to Rinchi); 287. "Shake" (揺れる, Yureru); 288. "Happiness" (幸福, Kōfuku); 289. "Honest Feelings" (素直な気持ち, Sunaona Kimochi); 290. "Sissy" (いくじなし, Ikuji Nashi); 291. "Trauma" (トラウマ, Torauma); 292. "Explosion" (爆発, Bakuhatsu); 293. "Awards" (表彰, Hyōshō); 294. "Dinner Party" (食事会, Shokuji-kai); 295. "War Pretend" (戦争ごっこ, Sensō-gokko); 296. "End" (終わり, Owari); 297. "Extraordinary Meeting" (臨時集会, Rinji Shūkai); 298. "Rally" (決起集会, Kekki Shūkai); 299. "Birthday" (誕生日, Tanjōbi); 300. "Outbreak of War" (開戦, Kaisen)
17	May 18, 2023	978-4-09-852136-4
Chapters 301–318
18	December 18, 2023	978-4-09-853105-9
Chapters 319–335
