= List of Suzuka chapters =

The cover of Suzuka volume 1 as released in Japan by Kodansha on May 15, 2004.

Suzuka is a Japanese manga series written and illustrated by Kouji Seo and published by Kodansha. Suzuka originally debuted in Weekly Shōnen Magazine in serialized form in issue #12, 2004 and in tankōbon form on May 17, 2004. There are 18 volumes (note two versions of volume 11 were printed: a regular issue, and a limited edition special printing), and two special edition guide books. The series concluded with volume 18.

== Chapter list ==
No.	Original release date	Original ISBN	English release date	English ISBN
1	May 17, 2004	978-4-06-363376-4	August 29, 2006	978-0-345-48631-8
0. "Suzuka" (涼風); 1. "Yamato" (大和); 2. "Hattori" (服部); 3. "Honoka" (萌果); 4. "Patient Visit" (見舞, Mimai)
Yamato Akitsuki moves into his aunt's women's public bathhouse and dorms in order to attend highschool. There, he becomes acquainted with the tenants living there and befriends Suzuka Asahina, a high jumper and his classmate. Yamato is then reacquainted with middle school friend, Yasunobu Hattori, who attempts to court Suzuka but is warded off. After the first day of school, Yamato comes down with a cold and is visited by his classmate Honoka Sakurai nurses his health.
2	July 15, 2004	978-4-06-363408-2	November 28, 2006	978-0-345-48632-5
5. "Glimpse" (片鱗, "Henrin"); 6. "Spring Mountain Air" (春嵐, "Shunran"); 7. "Secret" (秘密, "Himitsu"); 8. "Endless Arguments" (空転, "Kūten"); 9. "Realization" (自覚, "Jikaku"); 10. "Love Troubles" (恋患い, "Koi Wazurai"); 11. "Promise" (約束, "Yakusoku"); 12. "Love Confession-Announcement" (告白, "Kokuhaku"); 13. "Love Rejection" (失恋, "Shitsuren"); Character Profiles: 1. Yamato Akitsuki (秋月大和, Akitsuki Yamato); 2. Suzuka Asahina (朝比奈涼風, Asahina Suzuka); 3. Yasunobu Hattori (服部安信, Hattori Yasunobu); 4. Honoka Sakurai (桜井萌果, Sakurai Honoka)
Yamato's class has a physical test; during the test, Yamato displays his sprinting speed which garners attention from multiple sports club. The next day, Yamato forgets his umbrella and shares one with Suzuka. Since then Yamato begins to wonder if Suzuka likes him. A blackout occurs at the dorms so Suzuka stays with Yamato out of fear; during her stay, Yamato realizes he loves her. Yamato begins to build up courage to confess his feelings towards her; he succeeds but is rejected and becomes despondent.
3	September 17, 2004	978-4-06-363429-7	February 27, 2007	978-0-345-49048-3
14. "Start" (出発, "Shupattsu"); 15. "Determination" (決意, "Ketsui"); 16. "Distance" (距離, "Kyori"); 17. "Unreciprocated Love" (片想い, "Kataomoi"); 18. "Impatience" (焦心, "Shōshin"); 19. "Rejection" (拒絶, "Kyozetsu"); 20. "Housekeeping" (相似, "Sōji"); 21. "Photograph" (写真, "Shashin"); 22. "Love Rival" (恋敵, "Koi Gataki"); Character Profiles: 5. Yūka Saotome (早乙女優花, Saotome Yūka); 6. Megumi Matsumoto (松本恵美, Matsumoto Megumi); 7. Miki Hashiba (羽柴美紀, Hashiba Miki); 8. Sōichi Miyamoto (宮本総一, Miyamoto Sōichi)
Yamato resolves to make Suzuka fall for him and joins the track and field team; In response, Honoka follows Yamato and becomes the manager of the team. Suzuka continues to act coldly towards Yamato which encourages him to improve his running results in order to impress her. Yamato soon learns that Suzuka sees him as her deceased lover, Kazuki Tsuda, and becomes dejected by this.
04	November 17, 2004	978-4-06-363456-3	May 29, 2007	978-0-345-49049-0
023. "Kazuki" (和輝); 024. "Idiot" (馬鹿, "Baka"); 025. "Demand" (挑発, "Chōhatsu"); 026. "Pointed Attack Target" (矛先, "Hokosaki"); 027. "Contest" (勝負, "Shōbu"); 028. "Results" (決着, "Ketchaku"); 029. "Improvement" (好転, "Kōten"); 030. "Glance" (視線, "Shisen"); 031. "Fireworks" (花火, "Hanabi"); Character Profiles: 09. Miho Fujikawa (藤川美穂, Fujikawa Miho); 10. Ayano Fujikawa (藤川綾乃, Fujikawa Ayano); 11. Kazuki Tsuda (津田和輝, Tsuda Kazuki); 12. Arima Emerson (エメルソン有馬, Emerson Arima)
Yamato has stopped attending track and field since then. The track of field tournament preliminaries begins. There, Suzuka antagonists Arima Emerson, Kazuki's former rival, whose verbal retaliation encourages Yamato to participate in the 100 metres against him. Yamato loses, due to his deteriorated physical condition, and is comforted by Suzuka. They continue their daily lives and Honoka notices Yamato's growing relationship with Suzuka.
05	February 17, 2005	978-4-06-363489-1	August 28, 2007	978-0-345-49828-1
032. "Declaration of War" (宣戦, "Sensen"); 033. "Lips" (口唇, "Kuchibiru"); 034. "Shaken" (揺動, "Yōdō"); 035. "Witness" (目撃, "Mokugeki"); 036. "Revealed" (発覚, "Hakkaku"); 037. "Good Wishes" (祝福, "Shukufuku"); 038. "Sounds of Thunder" (霹靂, "Hekireki"); 039. "Twosome" (二人, "Futari"); 040. "Family Home" (実家, "Jikka")
Honoka asks Suzuka for permission to confess to Yamato whom the later states her hatred for. The track and field team travel to Yamato's hometown, Hokkaido, for a training camp. Honoka confesses her feelings to Yamato and he reciprocates, hoping he can move on from Suzuka. Yamato's mistake causes him and Suzuka to miss the train to Tokyo so the two stay at his family home.
6	May 17, 2005	978-4-06-363532-4	November 27, 2007	978-0-345-49829-8
41. "Firefly Bag" (蛍袋, "Hataru Bukuro"); 42. "Girlfriend" (彼女, "Kanojo"); 43. "Shock" (衝動, "Shōdō"); 44. "Regret" (後悔, "Kōkai"); 45. "Spring Rain" (秋雨, "Aki Ame"); 46. "Shirakawa" (白川); 47. "Boyfriend" (彼氏, "Kareshi"); 48. "Discussion" (相談, "Sōdan"); 49. "Shinjuku" (新宿); Character Profiles: 13. Tetsuhito Kinugasa (衣笠鉄人, Kinugasa Tetsuhito); 14. Nana Shirakawa (白川奈々, Shirakawa Nana); Suzukamon (涼風もん); Story 1. Muscle Development Medicine (筋肉増強剤, Kinniku Zōkyōzai)
Suzuka asks Yamato to show her around town and has him reenact a confession he had done in the past. After returning to Tokyo, Yamato attempts to have sex with Honoka in order to forget about Suzuka. His actions, instead, scare Honoka and the two reconcile afterwards. Honoka introduces Yamato to Nana Shirakawa, her friend, who realizes Yamato is only acting as a good boyfriend towards Honoka and is not in love with her; she however praises his efforts and tells her about Honoka's upcoming birthday. Later, Honoka sees Yamato shopping Suzuka for a birthday present.
7	July 15, 2005	978-4-06-363556-0	March 18, 2008	978-0-345-49918-9
50. "Gift" (贈物, "Okurimono"); 51. "Ignore" (無視, "Mushi"); 52. "Break Up" (別離, "Wakare"); 53. "Worst" (最低, "Saitei"); 54. "Decision" (決心, "Kesshin"); 55. "Cheer On" (応援, "Ōen"); 56. "True Feeling" (本心, "Honshin"); 57. "Repaired Friendship" (仲直, "Nakanaori"); 58. "Laundry" (洗濯, "Sentaku"); 59. "Mental Preparation" (覚悟, "Kakugo")
Honoka asks Yamato to break up with her and reveals she knew his feelings towards Suzuka since the beginning. Yamato antagonists Suzuka by telling her he broke up with because he was tired of her. Unable to stand her hating him any longer, Yamato reveals the truth to Suzuka. The track and field team enters a national tournament where Yamato is resolved to overcome Kazuki and earn Suzuka's love.
8	September 16, 2005	978-4-06-363575-1	June 17, 2008	978-0-345-50167-7
60. "Result" (成果, "Seika"); 61. "Sincere" (本気, "Honki"); 62. "Direction" (彷徨, "Hōkō"); 63. "Acceleration" (加速, "Kasoku"); 64. "Encouragement" (激励, "Gekirei"); 65. "FallTrap" (落穴, "Otoshi ana"); 66. "Miscalculation" (誤算, "Gosan"); 67. "Disappearance" (失踪, "Shissō"); 68. "Loss" (喪失, "Sōshitsu"); 69. "True Feeling" (本心, "Honshin")
Yamato ranks second on the 100 metres and is qualified for the city tournament. Meanwhile, Honoka is invited by Nana for a modeling photoshoot. Yamato is coached into changing his running style in order to maintain higher speeds for a longer period of time. Due to the lack of time to adjust to his new style, Yamato is eliminated after the first round in the tournament. Afterwards Yamato confesses his feelings to Suzuka, in a similar manner as Kazuki, which upsets her.
9	November 17, 2005	978-4-06-363597-3	September 23, 2008	978-0-345-50168-4
70. "Mutual Feelings" (相思, "Sōshi"); 71. "Gravesite Visit" (墓参, "Haka Mairi"); 72. "Mutual Love" (相愛, "Sōai"); 73. "Going home" (岐路, "Kiro"); 74. "Brightness" (光輝, "Kōki"); 75. "Pressure" (プレッシャ―, "Puresshā"); 76. "Abandon Ship" (船出, "Funade"); 77. "Name" (名前, "Namae"); 78. "Yokohama" (横浜); Extra Story Chapter (番外編, Bangai-hen); The Case of the Akitsuki Youth (秋月少年の事件簿, Akitsuki Shōnen no Jikenbo); Suzukamon (涼風もん); Story 3. Sergeant Caesar Hans Arrives (シイザアーハンズ軍曹登場!!, Shiizaā Hanzu Gunsō Tōjō!!)
Yamato attempts to persuade Suzuka to overcome her trauma of loss with Kazuki. Suzuka then has Yamato accompany her to Kazuki's grave for a final visit. Afterwards, the two begin dating. Meanwhile, Honoka is envious that Yamato and Suzuka has goals they are working towards, and decides to quit track and field and pursue a modeling.
10	January 17, 2006	978-4-06-363623-9	November 25, 2008	978-0-345-50833-1
79. "Nighttime Scene" (夜警, "Yakei"); 80. "Nursing the Ill" (看病, "Kanbyō"); 81. "Reliance" (信頼, "Shinrai"); 82. "Broad Shoulders" (肩幅, "Katahaba"); 83. "Important" (大切, "Taisetsu"); 84. "Plans" (計画, "Keikaku"); 85. "Stifling" (結衣, "Yūi"); 86. "Strife" (喧嘩, "Kenka"); 87. "Transformation" (返信, "Henshin"); Extra Story Chapter (番外編, Bangaihen); Miho (美穂)
Yamato accompanies Suzuka to her hometown Yokohama where he attempts to initiate a kiss but fails. After learning Suzuka has to attend a training camp during their Christmas break, the two make plans to spend time together. Yamato is pressured by Yasunobu to fill in for a guy in a group date and a girl named Yui Amami becomes attached to him. Suzuka sees this and is hurt by his betrayal.
11	April 17, 2006	978-4-06-363657-4	February 24, 2009	978-0-345-50834-8
88. "Approach" (接近, "Sekkin"); 89. "Reflection" (回想, "Kaisō"); 90. "True Feeling" (本音, "Honne"); 91. "New Year Shrine Visit" (初詣, "Hatsu Mōde"); 92. "Upper Classmen" (先輩, "Senpai"); 93. "Child" (子供, "Kodomo"); 94. "Special Order" (特注, "Tokuchū"); 95. "Second Battle" (再戦, "Ritorai"); 96. "Secret Things" (隠事, "Kakushigoto"); Extra Story Chapter (番外編, Bangai-hen); Miki (美紀); Suzukamon (涼風もん); Story 4. The Invisibility Candy (透明人間アメの巻, Tōmei Ningen Ame no Maki)
Yamato is able to reconcile with Suzuka. Later, Yamato is asked by his tenant, Yuka Saotome, to pose as a person interested in cleats in order to meet with Hiroshi Sasaoka, a man she is in love with. Coincidentally, Hiroshi's company is sponsoring Suzuka to attend school in America.
12	July 14, 2006	978-4-06-363694-9	August 25, 2009	978-0-345-50835-5
97. "Studying Abroad" (留学, "Ryūgaku"); 98. "Interview" (面接, "Mensetsu"); 99. "Friendly Accommodation" (和解, "Wakai"); 100. "First Day" (初日, "Shonichi"); 101. "Ability" (腕前, "Udemae"); 102. "Worry Free" (安心, "Anshin"); 103. "Future Prospects" (将来, "Shōrai"); 104. "Laundry" (洗物, "Araimono"); 105. "Misconnection" (擦違, "Surechigai"); 106. "Misgiving" (不満, "Fuman")
Yamato decides to find a job to invest in a computer to keep contact with Suzuka while she is overseas. He is then employed in Yui's family restaurant. Due to his busy time schedule, Yamato's performance in the 100 metres drops and he is berated by Suzuka who wants him to prioritize track and field over her.
13	September 15, 2006	978-4-06-363719-9	August 31, 2010	978-0-345-50836-2
107. "Pursuit Battle" (追打, "Oiuchi"); 108. "Hospital" (病院, "Byōin"); 109. "Opening" (隙間, "Sukima"); 110. "Tomorrow" (明日, "Ashita"); 111. "End" (最後, "Saigo"); 112. "Silence" (沈黙, "Chinmoku"); 113. "Park" (公園, "Kōen"); 114. "Airport" (空港, "Kūkō"); 115. "Summer Kimono" (浴衣, "Yukata"); 116. "Palpatation" (鼓動, "Kodō"); Hashibamon (羽柴もん); Story 1. Sharing Too Much (ぶっちゃけすぎの巻, Bucchake Sugi no Maki); Esper Miho (エスパー美穂, Esupā Miho); Story 1. What if Miho had Esper Powers... (もしも美穂がエスパーだったら..., Moshimo Miho ga Esupā Dattara...)
Yui becomes sick forcing Yamato to neglect track and field for work. Suzuka invites Yamato to an amusement park and suggests they break up. Yamato, hesitantly agrees, and makes a failed attempt to mend their relationship on the day of her departure. After brushing off Yui's attempts to comfort him, Yamato quits his job and donates his earnings from the job to a srhine.
14	December 15, 2006	978-4-06-363760-1	August 31, 2010	978-0-345-50836-2
117. "Reunion" (再開, "Saikai"); 118. "Refinement" (洗練, "Senren"); 119. "Captain" (主将, "Kyaputen"); 120. "Decision" (決断, "Ketsudan"); 121. "Return Home" (帰国, "Kikoku"); 122. "Friends" (友達, "Tomodachi"); 123. "Question" (質問, "Shitsumon"); 124. "Dinner" (夕飯, "Yūhan"); 125. "Regret" (悔恨, "Kaikon"); 126. "Saki" (咲希)
Shortly after, he is reunited with Honoka and the two amend their friendship. A year passes where Yamato and Honoka remain casual friends. Honoka, after confirming Yamato's feelings, decides to stop seeing him and begins dating a coworker. Yamato, realizing he had some feelings for Honoka, is dejected and returns home to find Suzuka who has returned to Japan. Later, Yamato is reacquinted with Saki Asai, a girl he was rejected by in middle school.
15	March 16, 2007	978-4-06-363805-9	August 31, 2010	978-0-345-50836-2
127. "Bomb" (爆弾, "Bakudan"); 128. "Scholarship" (推薦, "Suisen"); 129. "Together" (一緒, "Issho"); 130. "Reason" (理由, "Riyū"); 131. "Sibling" (兄妹, "Kyōdai"); 132. "Reply" (返答, "Hentō"); 133. "Impulse" (咄嗟, "Tossa"); 134. "Dark Clouds" (暗雲, "Anun"); 135. "Unexpected" (不意, "Fui"); 136. "Tolerance" (我慢, "Gaman"); Suzukamon (涼風もん); Story 5. The Tale of the Mon Mon Mons (もん もん もんの巻, Mon Mon Mon no Maki); Esper Miho (エスパー美穂, Esupā Miho); Story 2. The Tale of the Move, Miso Soup!! (動けお味噌汁!!の巻, Ugoke Omiso Shiru!! No Maki)
Yamato receives recommendation between two schools, one which Saki attends and the other where Suzuka attends. He decides to follow Suzuka, helping to reconcile their relationship. Later, he helps Yuka confess to her love and she is rejected. After witnessing her confession, Yamato confesses to Suzuka again and is convinces her he'll be tolerate of her and love her.
16	May 17, 2007	978-4-06-363830-1	February 7, 2017 (digital)	978-1-682-33547-5
137. "Three People" (三人, "Sannin"); 138. "Uncertainty" (不安, "Fuan"); 139. "Teacher" (先生, "Sensei"); 140. "Selection" (選抜 セレクション, "Senbatsu Serekushon"); 141. "Unmatriculated Student" (浪人, "Rōnin"); 142. "Celebration" (御祝, "Oiwai"); 143. "Father" (父親, "Chichi Oya"); 144. "One Step" (一歩, "Ippo"); 145. "Negotiation Stoppage" (決裂, "Ketsuretsu"); 146. "First Chapter" (序章, "Joshō"); Esper Miho (エスパー美穂, Esupā Miho); Story 3. The Tale of If You Listen Carefully.... (耳をすませばの巻, Mimi o Sumaseba... no Maki)
Their relationship is renewed and Yamato focuses on his studies in order to graduate. During the 100 metres for the school selection, Yamato messes his start and puts up a bad performance. The judges note this and select him as a candidate for their school. Afterwards, Yamato tries to advance onto Suzuka and the two have sex.
17	August 17, 2007	978-4-06-363867-7	February 14, 2017 (digital)	978-1-68-233548-2
147. "Body Heat" (体温, "Taion"); 148. "Restart" (再始 リスタート, "Sai Hajime Risutāto"); 149. "Hand Made" (手製, "Desei"); 150. "Plans" (計画, "Keikaku"); 151. "Lies" (口裏, "Kuchiura"); 152. "Decisive Behavior" (決行, "Ketsukō"); 153. "Severance" (断絶, "Danzetsu"); 154. "Apology" (謝罪, "Shazai"); 155. "Fruition" (結実, "Ketsujitsu"); 156. "Impossibility" (無理, "Muri"); Special Chapter (特別編, Tokubetsu-hen); Pretty Girl vs Steam vs Violence (美少女X湯煙Xバイオレンス, Bishōjo X Yukemuri X Baiorensu); Suzukamon (涼風もん); Story 6. The Tale of Farewell Suzukamon (さよなら涼風もんの巻, Sayonara Suzukamon no Maki)
Their daily lives continue until winter break where the Yamato and Suzuka secretly go off to an onsen against their parents' wishes. Yamato is able to gain forgiveness from Suzuka's father and the two are allowed to date again. Shortly after, Suzuka discovers she is three months pregnant.
18	October 17, 2007	978-4-06-363899-8	February 21, 2017 (digital)	978-1-682-33549-9
157. "Expectation" (期待, "Kitai"); 158. "The Request" (願事, "Onegaigoto"); 159. "Surprise" (吃驚, "Bikkuri"); 160. "Parents" (両親, "Ryōshin"); 161. "Family" (家族, "Kazoku"); 162. "Comrades" (仲間, "Nakama"); 163. "Job Search Life" (就活, "Shūkatsu"); 164. "Graduation" (卒業, "Sotsugyō"); 165. "Marriage Proposal" (求婚 (プロポーズ), "Kyūkon (Puropōzu)"); 166. "Suzuka" (涼風); Suzukamon (涼風もん); Story 7. Suzukamon Returns (帰ってきた涼風もんの巻, Kaettekita Suzukamon no Maki)
Realizing that giving birth to the child would mean they both lose their futures in university, Yamato is conflicted. After a discussion, he and Suzuka decide to have the baby and are able to convince their friends and family of their decision. Hiroshi is able to recommend Yamato for a position in a company with a track team, allowing him to work and further his career for the 100 metres. The two have an informal wedding, where a year later, they have their official wedding reception. Four years later, Yamato, Suzuka, and their daughter Fuka visit his hometown and Yamato spends time with Suzuka.

== Guide books ==
=== Suzuka Official Guide Book ===
- (Japanese: ISBN 4-06-372073-X)
- Publication issue date: September 16, 2005 (first printing)
- Cover: Suzuka

Special edition reference book for the Suzuka manga series covering volumes 1 through 8.

Includes profiles for all characters, including secondary characters (such as the recurring door-to-door sales girl (she's never named), the street jewelry vendor "Bobby", etc.).

The main characters are explored in detail: Their motivation, secret thoughts, dreams, etc. Each main character is interviewed using the 50 question technique: "What is your favorite school subject", "Your least favorite", "Two of your friends are fighting, what will you do", and so on. Although the first dozen or so questions are meaningless, the rest are quite revealing, and reading the different characters' answers to the same question set shows their personalities.

The inconsistencies in the series are explored. Contradictions such as how the apartment building is different from the outside versus the inside: Every drawing of the outside shows each apartment consists of two windows – a small window next to a large one on a veranda; yet, all internal drawings depict a single room with the large veranda window. Where did the small window go? The inconsistencies are never explained. The author merely acknowledges them, hinting that it's an inside joke.

There is a 19-page story called "Honoka" which explains how she decides to become the field and track team manager.

- Suzukamon (涼風もん)
- A Day Off for Suzukamon (涼風もんに休日を, Suzukamon ni Kyūshitsu o)

And finally, the author, Seo Kouji [Seo is the family name, Kouji is his first name], is interviewed. His philosophy and intentions for the Suzuka series are explained. Since all places depicted in his story are places he has been in, color photos from those areas are included along with the drawings from the manga.

=== Suzuka Official Guide Book - Graduation Edition ===
- Cover: Suzuka and Yamato, back to back in their high school uniforms
- (Japanese ISBN 978-4-06-372368-7)
- Announced Publication issue date: October 17, 2007 (First printing)

== Light novel ==
- Japanese title: Suzuka ~ Crossing the Startline (涼風 スタートラインを越えて, Suzuka Sutāto Rain o Koete)
- (Japanese: ISBN 978-4-06-373302-0)
- Publication issue date: May 17, 2007 (First printing)

A 223-page light novel, written in Japanese, featuring three short stories authored by Ayuna Fujisaki. Cover art and 12 full page illustrations by Kouji Seo. No official English translated version. Cover: Suzuka in a summer dress

- Story 1: Rinko (倫子) A new character, created for this story.
- Story 2: Honoka (萌果)
- Story 3: Suzuka (涼風)
