= Metamorphoses (disambiguation) =

Metamorphoses is a themed work of poetry composed by Ovid.

Metamorphoses, the plural of metamorphosis may also refer to:

== Cinema ==
- Metamorphoses, a 1912 film directed by Segundo de Chomón
- Métamorphoses, a 1946 film directed by Charles Dekeukeleire
- Metamorphoses (1978 film), an anime film produced by Sanrio
- Métamorphoses (2014 film), directed by Christophe Honoré

== Music ==
- Métamorphoses (album), a 2000 album by Jean-Michel Jarre
- Six Metamorphoses after Ovid, a piece for solo oboe by Benjamin Britten
- Metamorphosen, a work for 23 solo strings in 1945 by Richard Strauss

== Literature ==
- The Golden Ass, by Lucius Apuleius where the narrator is transformed into a donkey, also known as The Metamorphoses of Apuleius
- Metamorphoses (play), by Mary Zimmerman based on Ovid's work
- Metamorphoses, by Antoninus Liberalis

== Other uses ==
- Metamorphoses (TV series), a Brazilian telenovela television series starring Paolla Oliveira
- Ovid's Metamorphoses (sculpture), a 1889 sculpture by Auguste Rodin
- Metamorphoses, 1952 ballet choreographed by George Balanchine

== See also ==
- Métamorphose (disambiguation)
- Metamorphosis (disambiguation)
- Metamorphism
- Metamorphosis
- The Metamorphosis, a 1915 allegorical novella written by Franz Kafka
