= 23rd Japan Academy Film Prize =

Award presented by the Nippon Academy-Sho Association

- Date: March 10, 2000
- Site: Grand Prince Hotel New Takanawa, Tokyo, Japan
- Hosted by: Hiroshi Sekiguchi; Mieko Harada

Highlights
- Best Picture: Poppoya
- Most awards: Poppoya (9)
- Most nominations: Poppoya (13)

The 23rd Japan Academy Film Prize (第23回日本アカデミー賞) is the 23rd edition of the Japan Academy Film Prize, an award presented by the Nippon Academy-Sho Association to award excellence in filmmaking. It awarded the best films of 1999 and it took place on March 10, 2000 at the Grand Prince Hotel New Takanawa in Tokyo, Japan. The ceremony was hosted by actor and television presenter Hiroshi Sekiguchi and actress Mieko Harada.

Poppoya won nine awards, including Picture of the Year. Other winners included Dreammaker and Kikujiro with two, and Gohatto, I Love You, Messengers, Moumantai, Osaka Story, Owls' Castle, Salaryman Kintarō, Jubaku: Spellbound, The Geisha House, and The Sixth Sense with one.

== Winners and nominees ==
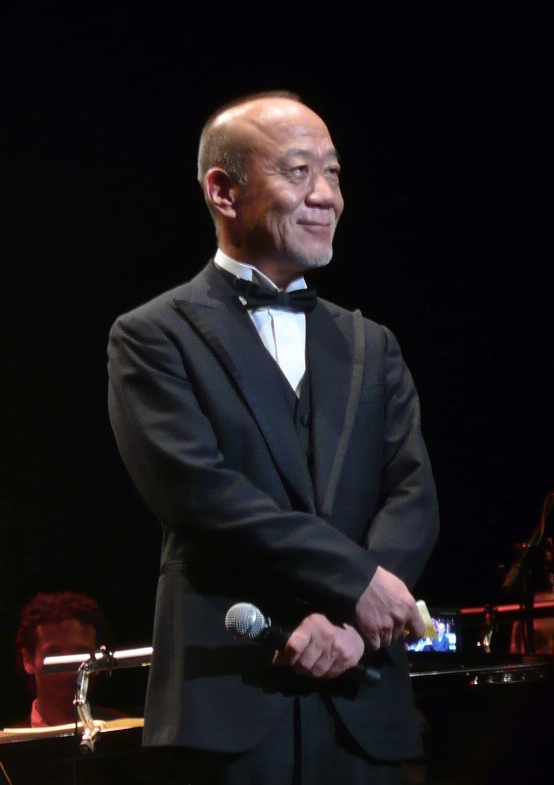
Joe Hisaishi, Outstanding Achievement in Music winner

=== Awards ===
| Picture of the Year | Director of the Year |
|---|---|
| Poppoya; Gohatto; Kikujiro; Owls' Castle; Jubaku: Spellbound | Yasuo Furuhata – Poppoya; Nagisa Oshima – Gohatto; Masahiro Shinoda – Owls' Castle; Masato Harada – Jubaku: Spellbound; Kinji Fukasaku – The Geisha House |
| Screenplay of the Year | Popularity Award |
| Yoshiki Iwama – Poppoya; Nagisa Oshima – Gohatto; Sumio Oomori – Keiho; Ryo Takasugi and Satoshi Suzuki – Jubaku: Spellbound; Kaneto Shindo – The Geisha House | Hiroyuki Yabe – Messengers (Actor Category); Moumantai (Production Category) |
| Outstanding Performance by an Actor in a Leading Role | Outstanding Performance by an Actress in a Leading Role |
| Ken Takakura – Poppoya; Kaoru Kobayashi – Himitsu; Kiichi Nakai – Keiho; Masahiro Motoki – Gemini; Kōji Yakusho – Jubaku: Spellbound | Shinobu Otake – Poppoya; Shinobu Otake – The Black House; Kyōka Suzuki – Keiho; Ryōko Hirosue – Himitsu; Shigeru Muroi – Amateur Singing Contest |
| Outstanding Performance by an Actor in a Supporting Role | Outstanding Performance by an Actress in a Supporting Role |
| Nenji Kobayashi – Poppoya; Takaya Kamikawa – Owls' Castle; Kippei Shiina – Jubaku: Spellbound; Shinji Takeda – Gohatto; Masahiko Nishimura – The Black House | Kayoko Kishimoto – Kikujiro; Kayoko Kishimoto – Himitsu; Ryōko Hirosue – Poppoya; Sumiko Fuji – The Geisha House; Mayumi Wakamura – Jubaku: Spellbound |
| Outstanding Achievement in Music | Outstanding Achievement in Cinematography |
| Joe Hisaishi – Kikujiro; Joji Yuasa – Owls' Castle; Ryoichi Kuniyoshi – Poppoya; Masamichi Amano – Jubaku: Spellbound | Daisaku Kimura – Poppoya; Toyomichi Kurita – Gohatto; Tatsuo Suzuki – Owls' Castle; Yoshitaka Sakamoto – Jubaku: Spellbound; Daisaku Kimura – The Geisha House |
| Outstanding Achievement in Lighting Direction | Outstanding Achievement in Art Direction |
| Mitsuo Watanabe – Poppoya; Toyomichi Kurita and Hiroshi Takehisa – Gohatto; Yoshio Unno – Owls' Castle; Takeshi Okubo – Jubaku: Spellbound; Kiyoto Ando – The Geisha House | Yoshinobu Nishioka – Owls' Castle; Yoshinobu Nishioka – Gohatto; Katsuhiro Fukuzawa – Poppoya; Kyoko Heya – Jubaku: Spellbound; Yoshinobu Nishioka – The Geisha House |
| Outstanding Achievement in Sound Recording | Outstanding Achievement in Film Editing |
| Kenichi Benitani – Poppoya; Kunio Andō – Gohatto; Fumio Hashimoto – Keiho; Tetsuo Segawa – Owls' Castle; Hitoshi Tsurumaki and Jun Nakamura – Jubaku: Spellbound | Akimasa Kawashima – Jubaku: Spellbound; Tomoyo Oshima – Gohatto; Hiroshi Yoshida – Owls' Castle; Kiyoaki Saito – Poppoya; Koichi Sonoi – The Geisha House |
| Outstanding Foreign Language Film | Newcomer of the Year |
| The Sixth Sense; Elizabeth; Life Is Beautiful; Shakespeare in Love; The Matrix | Issa Hentona – Dreammaker; Takako Uehara – Dreammaker; Ryuhei Matsuda – Gohatto; Chizuru Ikewaki – Osaka Story; Katsunori Takahashi – Salaryman Kintarō; Maki Miyamoto – The Geisha House |
| Special Award from the Chairman | Special Award from the Association |
| Utaemon Ichikawa (Actor); Masaru Sato (Composer); Kazuo Miyagawa (Cinematographer) | I Love You (Film); Shinichi Ito and team (Sound Effects); Sunao Sakagami (Producer) |

=== Films with multiple nominations and awards ===
Films that received multiple nominations
| Nominations | Film |
|---|---|
| 13 | Poppoya |
| 12 | Jubaku: Spellbound |
| 10 | Gohatto |
| 8 | The Geisha House |
| 4 | Keiho |
| 3 | Himitsu |
| 3 | Kikujiro |
| 2 | Dreammaker |
| 2 | The Black House |

Films that received multiple awards
| Awards | Film |
|---|---|
| 9 | Poppoya |
| 2 | Dreammaker |
| 2 | Kikujiro |
