= Yumi Takada =

Japanese voice actress

- 高田 由美
- Born: September 21, 1961 (age 65); Tokyo, Japan
- Occupation: Voice actress
- Years active: 1979–2009

Yumi Takada (高田 由美, Takada Yumi; born September 21, 1961 in Tokyo) is a former Japanese voice actress employed by 81 Produce.

== Notable voice roles ==
- Chitose Fujinomiya in Goldfish Warning!
- Alice Knox in Power Dolls
- Ayeka Masaki Jurai in Tenchi Muyo!
- Ayeka Takada (OVA)/Romio (TV), Ghost Girl (TV; episode 8) in Pretty Sammy
- Etsuko in Hanappe Bazooka
- Flare in Reyon Densetsu Flair
- Hatsuho Kazami in Please Teacher!
- Hiroe Ogawa in F3 (anime) (uncredited)
- Keikounitten Ruuan in Mamotte Shugogetten
- Saeko in Twin Dolls
- Ash in Demon Beast Invasion
- Kayo in Demon Beast Invasion
- Megumi in Urotsukidoji
- Nurse in Urotsukidoji
- Yumi in Urotsukidoji
- Alector in Urotsukidoji
- Midori in Adventure Kid
- Charlotte Flowers in Majokko Tsukune-chan
- Jennifer Portman in This Ugly Yet Beautiful World
- Midori-sensei in Ranma ½
- Noriko Okamachi/Sailor Ojo (ep 178) in Sailor Stars
- Shelley Godwin in Xenosaga
- Shikijou Saori in Mahoromatic
- Yoshinaga-sensei in Crayon Shin-chan
- Yumi in Immoral Sisters
- Etoile in Tensai Terebi-kun MAX

=== Tokusatsu ===
- Bee Lord/Apis Mellitus (ep. 22 - 23) in Kamen Rider Agito
- Terabiter (ep. 11 - 12) in Kamen Rider Ryuki
- Hexanoid: Hanabikinikibinas in Bakuryu Sentai Abaranger DELUXE: Abare Summer is Freezing Cold!

=== Dubbing ===
- American Psycho (Courtney Rawlinson (Samantha Mathis))
- Inspector Gadget (Penny (Cree Summer and Holly Berger))

=== Other Work ===
- Japanese Casting Associate for the movie Letters from Iwo Jima
