= Adventure Kid =

Japanese manga series

- Cover of the first manga volume of Adventure Kid

アドベンチャーKID (Adobenchā Kiddo)
- Genre: Erotic, fantasy, horror
- Manga
- Written by: Toshio Maeda
- Published by: Wanimagazine
- English publisher: NA: Central Park Media
- Original run: 1988 – 1989
- Volumes: 4
- Original video animation
- Directed by: Hideki Takayama
- Written by: Atsushi Yamatoya; Akio Satsugawa
- Music by: Masamichi Amano
- Studio: Phoenix Entertainment (as West Cape Corporation)
- Licensed by: NA: Central Park Media
- Released: 1992 – 1994
- Runtime: 40 min. each
- Episodes: 3

Adventure Kid (Japanese: アドベンチャーKID, Hepburn: Adobenchā Kiddo) is an erotic manga series written and illustrated by Toshio Maeda. It was published by Wanimagazine into four volumes from 1988 to 1989 and it was adapted into an original video animation (OVA). Mixing horror, fantasy and comedy, it follows Norizaku and Midori as they find a demonic computer that sends them to Hell and destroys their world. They are transported to a World War II setting and they have to prevent their future to be ruined.

In the British release of the anime the alternate name Adventure Duo was used because it was believed parents might buy it for their children by mistake without realizing the explicit sexual content and scenes of tentacle rape. Both the manga and OVA series were licensed in North America by Central Park Media, through its Manga 18 and Anime 18 divisions. The manga was well received for its art style and plot, while the anime was mostly criticized for its poor animation quality.

== Story ==
Episode 1: A young man named Norikazu finds a computer from World War II buried in his back garden. When he activates it, he and a girl named Midori are transported to Hell where erotic creatures and monsters of different kinds live. They meet some friends including a sexy elf woman named Eganko who falls in love with Norikazu, and a perverted monster prince who is soon enslaved by Midori. With the help of their new friends the pair try to make the dangerous journey back home.

Episode 2: Having made their way back home the adventure duo find the world they knew is gone, and is now ruled by the demonic computer which first sent them to Hell. They inexplicably travel back in time to World War II in an attempt to stop the world from being changed. In doing so, they witness the atomic bomb being dropped on Hiroshima, and there is an appearance of the Enola Gay, as well as numerous symbols of Japanese culture at the time.

Episode 3: This episode has a humorous love-quadrangle plot in which Eganko comes up with a plan to make Norikazu fall in love with her with a love potion, while simultaneously making Midori fall in love with an egotistical young man from her school. Their plan backfires when the love potions are mixed up and in the end everyone gets what they deserve.

== Content ==
Mariana Ortega-Brena, writing in the journal Sexuality & Culture, classified it as "situated somewhere between porn, sci-fi horror and the slasher film" with a darker tone than regular hentai. Helen McCarthy in 500 Essential Anime Movies called it "an insane mixture of pornography and sitcom," while Sequential Tart's Sheena McNeil affirmed it is "erotic fantasy with a good dose of humor." Jonathan Clements and McCarthy also remarked in The Anime Encyclopedia its horror content, while it was deemed "erotic grotesque" and "erotic violence" by McNeil and Oricon respectively.

Chris Beveridge of Mania.com compared the Hiroshima scene to the style of the film Dr. Strangelove and said there was an "almost outright theft" of Terminator 2: Judgment Day's main theme by Brad Fiedel. Clements and McCarthy wrote that it adds a sexual content on the "alien girlfriend-squatter set-up of Urusei Yatsura" and found humorous references condemning the excesses of the author's previous work, Urotsukidōji.

== Manga ==
Written and illustrated by Toshio Maeda, the manga was published by Wanimagazine in four tankōbon volumes between November 1988 and November 1989. Central Park Media translated it into English and published the four volumes through its Manga 18 label from January to November 2003.

== Anime ==
A three-episode original video animation (OVA) titled Yōjū Sensen Adventure Kid (Note: "妖獣戦線アドベンチャーKID" in the original version, it is translated as "Demon-Beast Battle Line Adventure Kid" by The Anime Encyclopedia. The British release rendered it as Youjyusensen.) was directed by Hideki Takayama. (Note: The British Board of Film Classification and CD Journal say the director was Hideki Takayama, while The Anime Encyclopedia indicates Yoshitaka Fujimoto's name.) Originally the production staff wanted to have live-action erotic actresses dubbing some characters to create a public appeal but with no background on it the hired cast was not able to act. Published through VHS format, the three volumes were released each in a year from 1992 to 1994 by MW Films and Jupiter Films. Tokuma Japan Communications rereleased the entire series into three volumes in February 2002.

Its North American publication rights were acquired by Central Park Media in the 1990s that kept it until its bankruptcy in 2009. Central Park Media through its Anime 18 division first released the subtitled episodes into two volumes—both in VHS and CD-ROM format—and later into a single VHS containing the dubbed episodes. A DVD release of the whole series by Central Park Media occurred in 2001. For the British release, it was renamed Adventure Duo because of concerns that the word "kid" could mask its sexual content and suggest the show was acceptable for young audiences. Also, all episodes had to be edited in order to pass certification of the British Board of Film Classification; a minute of video was cut from the first while the last had over nine minutes cut. Paradox released three VHS volumes in the 1990s while Kiseki Films published a single one in 2002.

== Reception ==
The manga was called a classic hentai title by Patrick King of Animefringe. Sheena McNeil reviewed positively all manga volumes, and was mainly impressed with the fact that sexual content—"quite a variety of sexual activities" that gradually changes from softcore to hardcore—had usually a purpose within the plot instead of being "just there." In her words: "It's hentai with plot — and I'm not talking a semblance of a plot thrown in to hold the sex together, I'm talking about an actual plot which makes Adventure Kid an enjoyable read on multiple levels." She praised its "well thought-out characters" and dubbed its art "exceptional" stating it "is graphic, but it's not in your face extreme." McNeil summed up her opinion: "Provocative, humorous, dirty, and ingenious, it took a while to develop and get it on (more than fondling and blow-jobs), but it was well worth it." Allen Divers, writing for Anime News Network, reviewed the third volume of the manga and said that "Adventure Kid is a well drawn tale with a variety of sight gags and quite witty dialogue." For the last volume, Martin Ouellette of Protoculture Addicts commented that "While not the best work of Maeda, it does contain everything a hentai otaku will ever need: sex, weird sex and bizarre sex (as well as immoral sex)."

Reviewing the anime, Chris Beveridge criticized the "poor animation and the extensively bad lighting style used" as well as the "mock" dialogues. The reviewer concluded that he "probably should have cut [his] losses after the first five minutes," ultimately stating "Avoid at all costs, unless you love to MST3K anime."
