= The Flying Luna Clipper =

- Print advertisement from MSX Magazine for The Flying Luna Clipper (October 1987)
- Directed by: Ikko Ono
- Written by: Ikko Ono
- Story by: Ikko Ono
- Produced by: Kan Tsuzurahara
- Starring: Anne Lambert; Ina Krantz; Mark Hagan; Zev Asher
- Music by: ANZ; Masamichi Amano; Yoshinobu Morikawa
- Production company: Sony Video Software International
- Release date: 1 October 1987 (Japan)
- Running time: 55 minutes
- Country: Japan
- Language: English

The Flying Luna Clipper (ザ・フライング・ルナクリッパー) is a 1987 Japanese computer-animated art film/demo directed by Ikko Ono and produced by Sony. The film was animated entirely using 8-bit MSX computers and was released on Video8, Betamax, VHS, and LaserDisc in Japan. It was mostly unknown until a copy was found in a Japanese thrift store and uploaded to YouTube in December 2015 by journalist Matt Hawkins.

== Plot ==
The film depicts a group of anthropomorphic fruits and other creatures who win a contest for a ticket on the first flight of a newly found Martin M-130 flying boat named the Flying Luna Clipper. Departing from Honolulu, they embark on a journey across the Pacific Ocean and watch short films on a 200-inch screen during the trip.

== Background ==
Ikko Ono is a graphic designer who worked as the cover artist for MSX Magazine from 1986. He also had his own column called Ikko's Gallery about using the computer as a tool for illustration. Many of the illustrations he created for the magazine depict characters seen in the film. Later he had another column called Ikko's Theatre about short films which served as the basis for The Flying Luna Clipper. It was first announced in the May 1987 issue of the magazine to celebrate the fifth anniversary of the publication, and according to the same magazine, was released via home video on 1 October of that year, and was featured again in Ikko's Theatre the following month.

== Legacy ==
A revived run of MSX Magazine was published between 2002 and 2005. A special limited edition of the magazine published a series of 12 artworks in December 2003 by Ohno featuring characters from the film entitled "The Flying Luna Clipper 2004", followed by a calendar featuring the art for that year. However, a sequel was never created. The film remained obscure until December 2015 when a LaserDisc copy was uploaded online by Matt Hawkins, after which it steadily grew in popularity. In 2019, Hawkins screened it theatrically at the Wonderville arcade in New York City, doing so again a year later in 2020.

In December 2021, an interview with Ohno on the film, conducted by Victor Navarro-Remesal, Marçal Mora-Cantallops, and Yoshihiro Hino, was published in ROMchip: A Journal of Game Histories, featuring contributed art, storyboards and promotional material from Ohno's collection. ROMchip noted its distinctive style due to being produced using an 8-bit computer typically used for video games, terming it "chipcinema" and comparing it to later developments such as machinima - narrative films created within specific video games - and demoscene - a computer art scene based around creating advanced art and music on technically limited systems. An article on the film published in Senses of Cinema in January 2022 described it as "absolutely, almost singularly devoted to spectacle" and "a forward-thinking and technological marvel, that far precedes a number of digital artforms that are now dominant in modern media", and describing its style as "proto-vaporwave".
