= Giant Robo: The Day the Earth Stood Still =

Japanese OVA series

- U.S. cover of Giant Robo: The Animation DVD thin-pack

ジャイアントロボ THE ANIMATION — 地球が静止する日 (Jaianto Robo ji Animēshon: Chikyū ga Seishisuru Hi)
- Created by: Mitsuteru Yokoyama
- Original video animation
- Directed by: Yasuhiro Imagawa
- Produced by: Yasuhito Yamaki
- Written by: Eiichi Matsuyama (#1); Yasuhiro Imagawa (#2–7)
- Music by: Masamichi Amano
- Studio: Mu Animation Studio (#1–4); Phoenix Entertainment (#5–7)
- Licensed by: NA: Discotek Media
- Released: July 22, 1992 – January 25, 1998
- Runtime: 40–60 minutes (each)
- Episodes: 7
- Manga
- Written by: Yasuhiro Imagawa
- Illustrated by: Mari Mizuta
- Published by: Kadokawa Shoten
- Magazine: Comic Genki
- Original run: 1992 – 1993
- Volumes: 2
- Original video animation

Gin Rei
- Directed by: Takeshi Mori (#1); Umanosuke Iida (#2–3)
- Produced by: Yasuhito Yamaki
- Written by: Hiroshi Ueda (#1); Yū Sugitani (#1); Michiko Yokote (#2–3)
- Music by: Masamichi Amano
- Studio: Mu Animation Studio (#1); Phoenix Entertainment (#2–3)
- Licensed by: NA: Discotek Media
- Released: February 20, 1994 – February 21, 1995
- Runtime: 20–30 minutes (each)
- Episodes: 3
- Manga

The Day the Earth Burned
- Written by: Yasuhiro Imagawa
- Illustrated by: Yasunari Toda
- Published by: Akita Shoten
- Magazine: Champion Red
- Original run: September 2006 – January 2011
- Volumes: 9
- icon

Giant Robo the Animation: The Day the Earth Stood Still (ジャイアント・ロボ THE ANIMATION — 地球が静止する日, Jaianto Robo ji Animēshon: Chikyū ga Seishisuru Hi) is a 1992–1998 OVA series based on Mitsuteru Yokoyama's manga series Giant Robo. It was written and directed by Yasuhiro Imagawa.

Giant Robo is a homage to Yokoyama's career. The series features characters and plotlines from Yokoyama's entire canon of work, effectively creating an all-new story. The events take place in the near future, ten years after the advent of the Shizuma Drive triggers the third energy revolution. The series follows the master of the titular Robo, Daisaku Kusama, and the Experts of Justice, an international police organization locked in battle with the BF Group, a secret society hell-bent on world domination.

The OVA is recognized for its "retro" style and operatic score. The character designs emulate Yokoyama's drawing style and the action setpieces are influenced by Hong Kong action cinema.

The first installment of the series, "The Black Attaché Case", was released on July 22, 1992. Originally intended to finish within 36 months, the seven-volume series was ultimately released over the span of six years. "The Grand Finale" was released on January 25, 1998. The OVA has since been translated into English, Cantonese, Dutch, French, Italian, Korean, Portuguese and Spanish.

== Plot ==
The series takes place in a retro-futuristic setting, where the Shizuma Drive ends the depletion of petroleum resources and the need for nuclear power. The system is a non-polluting recyclable energy source that powers everything on land, sea and air. Ten years prior to the events of the series a team of scientists, led by Professor Shizuma, created the revolutionary system. In the process they nearly destroyed the world and one of their own, Franken von Vogler, was lost in the event that went down in history as the "Tragedy of Bashtarle." At the start of Giant Robo, the BF Group is in the middle of recreating the event with aid from the resurfaced von Vogler.

The story explores a society completely brought down, within the span of one week, because of dependency on a single energy source and a state of prosperity tainted by compromise and deceit.

The BF Group (BF団, Bīefu dan) is the main antagonist of the series. Their origin is unknown, but not so their reason to be: to lead mankind down a road of ruin. The Group's forces consist of mechanical monsters, foot soldiers and Experts (エキスパート, Ekisupāto), individuals with superhuman powers.

The most powerful Experts form the ruling cadre of the organization, the cabal of the Magnificent Ten (十傑集, Jūkesshū). Its members swear allegiance to Big Fire (ビッグ・ファイア, Biggu Faia), the Group's founder and leader, with faltering loyalty punishable by death. At the time of The Day the Earth Stood Still, the Ten are gearing up for the final showdown with the IPO.

The International Police Organization (国際警察機構, Kokusai Keisatsu Kikō) is the BF Group's counterpart in the Giant Robo universe. The leaders of the world acknowledged Big Fire as a threat to world security and signed the charter creating the IPO. The IPO's methods are information and espionage, looking to bring down the BF Group rather than defeating them in an all-out war.

However, to counter Big Fire's superhuman elements, "Experts" are recruited and granted special international jurisdiction. The agents assembled are known as the Experts of Justice (正義のエキスパート, Seigi no Ekisupāto). Working with the Experts from the Peking Branch is Daisaku Kusama. While he does not possess any special powers, Daisaku is the one and only master of Giant Robo. Constructed by Daisaku's father, Giant Robo is the IPO's trump card against Big Fire.

== Production ==
Producer Yasuhito Yamaki was working on a spin-off of Final Yamato, titled Dessler's War, but it was shelved. However, since he had already invited many staff members to work on the project, he felt it would be a waste to do nothing, and so he began planning Giant Robo. As a replacement for Yamato, he chose a robot anime, which was the mainstream of mecha anime at the time. Yamaki initially thought of producing Tetsujin 28-go, but while that series had been remade many times, Giant Robo had reruns of the 1967 live-action adaptation but no anime remakes, which is why he chose it as his subject. Due to budget overruns, the project was stagnant for about three years, but while Yamaki was working on Urotsukidōji, he was approached by Masayuki Miyashita, who had moved from Nippon Columbia to Amuse Video, and the project was revived.

The first staff member to be appointed was director Yasuhiro Imagawa. A self-proclaimed fan of Yokoyama's work, Imagawa jumped at the chance of working on the project. In pre-production, Imagawa was informed he could not use any of the supporting characters from the manga or live action versions. Instead, with Yokoyama's permission, he populated the series with characters from the artist's entire canon of work, including Akakage, Babel II and Godmars. Yamaki had intended to use a star system and feature characters from Yokoyama's works with the same appearance but different personalities, but Imagawa wanted to keep the characters as they were. Some characters were reinterpreted with Yokoyama's approval. The Giant Robo OVA still follows Daisaku and Robo, and the main antagonist is still called "Big Fire," but it features an all-new storyline with a completely different cast of characters.

After Imagawa, Makoto Kobayashi joined the staff as the image concept designer. Among the special guest key animators, Hideaki Anno heard rumors about the project and reached out himself. Although Yamaki does not remember how he called on Shōichi Masuo, he asked him to participate because he was "an animator with excellent effects technique and taste." Science fiction writer Chiaki Kawamata, who had connections with Yamaki through Yamato, created the traits for the Shizuma Drive. The title calligrapher, Teigan Tsuda, was the husband of a friend of Yamaki's wife.

The first episode was released July 22, 1992, with the following three installments staying close to the proposed schedule of six months between releases. Eiichi Matsuyama, the screenwriter for the first episode, passed away midway through production, and his name was combined with that of those who took over to form the name "Hidekazu Matsuyama", (Note: Hidekazu Matsuyama was incorrectly romanized as Hideaki Yamamoto in the credits of the English version.) which appears in the credits. In order to alleviate the dwindling budget for the main series, a spin-off OVA series focusing on the character of Gin Rei was produced with the intention to create a lightweight but profitable work. However, costs exceeded expectations and the series made almost no profit. Barefoot Gin Rei (素足の銀鈴, Suashi no GinRei), released between volumes 4 and 5 of Giant Robo, is a humorous take on Gin Rei's job as a spy for the IPO. Mighty Gin Rei (鉄腕銀鈴, Tetsuwan GinRei), released between volumes 5 and 6 of Giant Robo, is a send up of super robot series and features Ken Ishikawa as guest mech designer. Gin Rei with Blue Eyes (青い瞳の銀鈴, Aoi Hitomi no Gin Rei), which features an opening segment reminiscent of that of Sergio Leone's film Once Upon a Time in the West, was released between volumes 6 and 7 of Giant Robo. There were also plans for a fourth OVA, Space Detective Gin Rei (宇宙刑事銀鈴, Uchū Keiji Ginrei), but it was shelved.

The final episode was released January 1998, almost three years after episode six. In between releases, members of the Giant Robo staff worked on other projects, including The Big O, Getter Robo Armageddon, and Super Atragon, a two-episode OVA of Shunro Oshikawa's Kaitei Gunkan novel.

Imagawa intended The Day the Earth Stood Still to be the second to final chapter in the conflict between the Experts of Justice and Big Fire. The OVA would be preceded by The Birth of Zangetsu the Midday, The Plan to Assassinate Daisaku - the Canary Penitentiary, The Boy of Three Days, The Greatest Battle in History - General Kanshin vs. Shokatsu Koumei and The Boy Detective, Kindaichi Shōtarō, Appears! The final chapter is titled The Siege of Babel. No further stories have been animated.

=== Music ===
Donizetti's aria serves as theme to the events of "The Tragedy of Bashtarle", always seen in flashback and shades of gray.

The score of Giant Robo was composed, arranged and conducted by Masamichi Amano and performed by the Warsaw Philharmonic Orchestra and Choir. The music ranges from grand pieces like "Charge! His Name is Giant Robo" to more light-hearted tracks like "Tetsugyu in Love." Amano makes use of leitmotifs, recurring musical themes associated with different characters, places or events.

Giant Robo's "Dies Irae" is first heard during the destruction of the Champs-Élysées in episode one. The hymn, written in Medieval Latin, describes what is known in Christian eschatology as Judgment Day. Along with Amano's original compositions, the soundtrack features "Una furtiva lagrima" from the 1832 opera L'elisir d'amore. For Imagawa, the aria embodies one of the themes of Giant Robo: "the sorrow of others not understanding your true feelings".

The music of Giant Robo has been called one of the OVA's best accomplishments. The complete score was released in seven soundtracks by Nippon Columbia. The first two soundtracks were released in North America by AnimeTrax.

== Episodes ==
=== Titles and release dates ===
#	Title	Length	Release date
1	"The Black Attache Case"	56 minutes	July 22, 1992
2	"The Tragedy of Bashtarlle"	44 minutes	February 20, 1993
3	"The Magnetic Web Strategy"	39 minutes	August 20, 1993
4	"The Twilight of the Super Heroes"	46 minutes	January 20, 1994
5	"The Truth of Bashtarlle"	46 minutes	October 21, 1994
6	"Crime and Punishment"	49 minutes	June 25, 1995
7	"The Grand Finale"	60 minutes	January 25, 1998
GR1	"Barefoot Gin Rei"	21 minutes	February 20, 1994
GR2	"Mighty Gin Rei"	24 minutes	August 20, 1994
GR3	"Gin Rei with Blue Eyes"	30 minutes	February 21, 1995

=== Staff ===
Role	Episode 1	Episode 2	Episode 3	Episode 4	Episode 5	Episode 6	Episode 7
Director	Yasuhiro Imagawa	Yasuhiro Imagawa	Yasuhiro Imagawa	Yasuhiro Imagawa	Yasuhiro Imagawa	Yasuhiro Imagawa	Yasuhiro Imagawa
Screenwriter	Eiichi Matsuyama	Yasuhiro Imagawa	Yasuhiro Imagawa	Yasuhiro Imagawa	Yasuhiro Imagawa	Yasuhiro Imagawa	Yasuhiro Imagawa
Character Designer	Akihiko Yamashita	Akihiko Yamashita	Akihiko Yamashita	Akihiko Yamashita	Akihiko Yamashita	Akihiko Yamashita	Akihiko Yamashita
Character Designer	Toshiyuki Kubooka	Toshiyuki Kubooka	Toshiyuki Kubooka	Toshiyuki Kubooka	Masami Ozone	Masami Ozone	Masami Ozone
Animation director	Toshiyuki Kubooka	Toshiyuki Kubooka	Kenji Hayama	Masami Ozone	Akihiko Yamashita	Keiichi Satō	Akihiko Yamashita
Art director	Hiromasa Ogura	Masanori Kikuchi	Yūsuke Takeda	Hiroshi Katō	Masaru Ohta	Masaru Ohta	Yūsuke Takeda
Storyboards	Kazuyoshi Katayama	Kazuyoshi Katayama	Shinji Higuchi	Akihiko Yamashita	Kazuyoshi Katayama	Kazuyoshi Katayama	Akihiko Yamashita
Storyboards	Kazuyoshi Katayama	Kazuyoshi Katayama	Shinji Higuchi	Yasuhiro Imagawa	Kazuyoshi Katayama	Kazuyoshi Katayama	Yasuhiro Imagawa
Mechanical designer	Takashi Watabe	Takashi Watabe	Takashi Watabe	Takashi Watabe	Takashi Watabe	Takashi Watabe	Keiichi Satō
Editor	Shigeru Nishiyama	Shigeru Nishiyama	Shigeru Nishiyama	Shigeru Nishiyama	Shigeru Nishiyama	Shigeru Nishiyama	Shigeru Nishiyama
Music	Masamichi Amano	Masamichi Amano	Masamichi Amano	Masamichi Amano	Masamichi Amano	Masamichi Amano	Masamichi Amano
Sound director	Yasunori Honda	Yasunori Honda	Yasunori Honda	Yasunori Honda	Yōta Tsuruoka	Yōta Tsuruoka	Kensei Date
Producer	Yasuhito Yamaki	Yasuhito Yamaki	Yasuhito Yamaki	Yasuhito Yamaki	Yasuhito Yamaki	Yasuhito Yamaki	Yasuhito Yamaki
Producer	Minoru Takanashi	Minoru Takanashi	Minoru Takanashi	Minoru Takanashi	Tatsuya Hoshina	Ken Matsumoto	Ken Matsumoto
Producer	Minoru Nakazawa	Minoru Nakazawa	Kōichi Murakami	Kōichi Murakami	Hideo Kawano	Hideo Kawano	Ken'ichirō Zaizen
Executive producer	Masayuki Miyashita	Masayuki Miyashita	Masayuki Miyashita	Masayuki Miyashita	Masayuki Miyashita	Masayuki Miyashita	Masayuki Miyashita
Executive producer	Shin Unozawa	Shin Unozawa	Shin Unozawa	Shin Unozawa	Shin Unozawa	Shin Unozawa	Shigeru Watanabe
Animation studio	Mu Animation Studio	Mu Animation Studio	Mu Animation Studio	Mu Animation Studio	Phoenix Entertainment	Phoenix Entertainment	Phoenix Entertainment

Role	Gin Rei Episode 1	Gin Rei Episode 2	Gin Rei Episode 3
Director	Takeshi Mori	Umanosuke Iida	Umanosuke Iida
Screenwriter	Hiroshi Ueda	Michiko Yokote	Michiko Yokote
Screenwriter	Yū Sugitani	Michiko Yokote	Michiko Yokote
Character Designer	Akihiko Yamashita	Akihiko Yamashita	Akihiko Yamashita
Character Designer	Toshiyuki Kubooka	Akio Takami	Akio Takami
Animation director	Kōji Yoshikawa	Keiji Shimone	Keiichi Satō
Art director	Hiroshi Katō	Tōru Koga	Tōru Koga
Storyboards	Takeshi Mori	Umanosuke Iida	Kenji Hayama
Editor	Shigeru Nishiyama	Shigeru Nishiyama	Shigeru Nishiyama
Music	Masamichi Amano	Masamichi Amano	Masamichi Amano
Sound director	Yasunori Honda	Yōta Tsuruoka	Yōta Tsuruoka
Producer	Yasuhito Yamaki	Yasuhito Yamaki	Yasuhito Yamaki
Producer	Toshiki Ōnishi	Ken Matsumoto	Ken Matsumoto
Executive producer	Shigeru Watanabe	Shigeru Watanabe	Shigeru Watanabe
Animation studio	Mu Animation Studio	Phoenix Entertainment	Phoenix Entertainment

== Design ==
For series director Yasuhiro Imagawa, the world where the story unfolds must be convincing, for it is the setting and themes what determine the character and mecha designs. In the world of Giant Robo, "anything goes". The technology is futuristic and the morals are modern. The world's outlook is bright, but there is an underlying sense of some sinister motive beneath it. Wuxia heroes coexist with modern-day espers and giant robots as soldiers in a struggle between good and evil.

=== Art style ===
The Giant Robo OVA is one of many anime titles based on old properties produced in Japan during the 1990s. While titles like Bubblegum Crisis 2040, Dirty Pair Flash and Tekkaman Blade gave modern spins to old classics, the creators of Giant Robo decided to go with a "retro" look.

The characters were designed by Toshiyuki Kubooka (Lunar series, The Idolmaster) and Akihiko Yamashita. (Princess Nine, Tide-Line Blue) The designers were asked to emulate Yokoyama's characters rather than create new ones. Yamaki recalls that it was a good idea to use their advanced techniques to create three-dimensional character animation to portray Yokoyama's characters. Admittedly "it took some time to catch on to Director Imagawa's intentions", but with repetition the staff was able to achieve Imagawa's vision of characters that look like they stepped out of anime from the 1960s.

The mechanical design is a case of high technology meets old school engineering. The titular mecha is an advanced piece of machinery, equipped with booster rockets and hidden weapons throughout. Sporting big stovepipe arms and exposed rivets, the hulking giant is more like a weapon of mass destruction than a "robot superhero". Vehicles like the Shizuma-powered Beetle or the Experts' airship fortress in the design of a zeppelin appear as if they had been conceived at the turn of the 20th century, giving the world of Giant Robo a timeless feel.

Giant Robo is credited with generating interest in re-imagining other artists' works, including Osamu Tezuka and Go Nagai, and creating a "retro" style that has been used in productions like Sakura Wars.

=== Influences ===
The modern notion of the giant robot genre can be traced back to the 1970s. The works of Go Nagai (Mazinger, Getter Robo) created the genre and the debut of Yoshiyuki Tomino's Mobile Suit Gundam in 1979 solidified it. In this genre, the mecha is the focal point of the action. But for a genre anime, Giant Robo does not feature many giant robot battles; instead, it is the human characters who do the fighting.

Most of the "Experts" featured in The Day the Earth Stood Still come from Yokoyama's manga adaptations of Outlaws of the Marsh and Romance of the Three Kingdoms, both wuxia novels and half of the "Four Classics" of Chinese literature. Wuxia are martial arts adventures populated by skilled, honorable fighters. In Hong Kong action cinema, the genre is associated with swordplay epics sprinkled with mysticism.

Given their origin, the heroes and villains of Giant Robo are superhuman combatants who share many elements with the errant knights of wuxia like strength, magic powers and the ability to fly. In wuxia adventures, the characters are given nicknames that allude to their mastery of weapons, their physical appearance or their demeanor (Crouching Tiger, Hidden Dragon). Imagawa, inspired by Yokayama's adaptation of Outlaws of the Marsh, followed this convention and gave Giant Robo's characters similar descriptive names like "Shockwave Alberto", "Silent Chūjō" and "Kenji The Immortal."

In jiang hu, secret societies plot against the status quo (House of Flying Daggers) and powerful clans do war with each other. Giant Robo features the ongoing conflict between the Experts of Justice and the BF Group. Woven into the story are values commonly associated with martial arts films like honor, loyalty and individual justice, best exemplified in the rivalry between Alberto and Taisō.

=== Themes ===
Giant Robo is structured as a "character driven drama," emphasizing the relationships and personal histories of the characters over a mystery surrounding the titular mecha or a philosophical diatribe. At the time of the series, Daisaku is 12 years old and the only child in the Experts of Justice. Giant Robo is the story of how Daisaku grows up and works to respect his father's last will and testament of protecting the world from the BF Group.

The OVA is comparable to a bildungsroman, where the story traces the main character's development from childhood to maturity. The two most important characters in the boy's coming of age are his fellow Experts Tetsugyu and Kenji Murasame. Tetsugyu is a grown-up, but still a "child" at heart. In the course of the story he and Daisaku grow up and mature, creating a parallel between them. Kenji, on the other hand, is what Daisaku sees as an "adult." Willing to sacrifice others for the sake of happiness, Kenji contrasts Daisaku's idealism.

The story delves on the relationship between fathers and sons and the unbreakable bond that exists between them. The characters of Daisaku and Genya lost their fathers at a young age and have been entrusted with a legacy that turns them into adversaries during The Day the Earth Stood Still. Mirror images of one another, the characters fight to fulfill their respective fathers' dying wish at the expense of the other's.

Dr. Kusama's dying question to Daisaku ("Can happiness be obtained without sacrifice? Can a new era be achieved without tragedy?") is at the crux of the series. Shizuma and his colleagues gave the world a new era of prosperity at the expense of billions of lives. The BF Group is willing to cause great misfortune to make their ideal world a reality, while many sacrifice themselves to protect it. The ending is bittersweet, with both sides suffering losses. For Imagawa, this was the only way of getting his point across. The series ends with a dedication to all fathers and their children "giving a glimmer of hope in the midst of all the sorrow."

The series may also be seen as "sort of an analogy or an allegory about nuclear technology", especially in the context of Japan's complex relationship to both its destructive and constructive aspects.

== Release ==
The series was originally released by Bandai Visual on VHS and LaserDisc from 1992 to 1998. On March 24, 2000, Toshiba Entertainment released the series on Region 2 DVD. The Giant Robo Giga Premium Collection (ASBY-1600) features digitally remastered video and audio, interviews with the creators and a companion book. Then, Media Factory released a limited edition Blu-ray Box on October 26, 2012, with the video remastered to 4K, as well as the NYAV Post English dub, interviews with the staff and Japanese cast, audio commentary by the staff, and a performance by the Warsaw National Philharmonic Orchestra. A standard edition Blu-ray Box was released on April 24, 2015, this time with English subtitles included.

The distribution of the English-language version has been handled by five different companies. A LaserDisc edition was released by L.A. Hero in 1994. After L.A. Hero's license expired, it was released on VHS by U.S. Renditions and Manga Entertainment. After Manga Entertainment's license expired, Media Blasters released Giant Robo on DVD. Media Blasters' 2004 release includes the Japanese language track, the Manga Entertainment dub, an all-new dub by NYAV Post and subtitled Japanese commentary tracks on some of the episodes. After Media Blasters' license expired, Discotek Media announced at Otakon 2018 on August 12 that they have picked up the series for a Blu-ray release. Despite the included Gin Rei OVA being in a separate DVD release, it would include everything from Media Blasters' previous release. Discotek has also hoped to produce brand new extras for this release as well. It was released on December 24, 2019, while the Gin Rei release was released on December 29, 2020.

Giant Robo was distributed in the Netherlands by Manga DVD and in Hong Kong by Asia Video. The French version, dubbed by Saint Maur Studios, was distributed by Pathé. The series was released in Italy by Granata Press.

== Related media ==
Along with the animated version, Imagawa scripted a manga illustrated by Masami Ozone (under the pseudonym of Mari Mizuta). Serialized in Kadokawa Shoten's Comic Genki, it delves deeper into the machinations of the BF Group and introduces Yellow Emperor Raise (黄帝・ライセ, Kitei Raise) as Big Fire's counterpart in the IPO. The issues were later collected in two volumes published under the Newtype 100% Comics imprint.

- Giant Robo Volume 1 (ISBN 4-04-852343-0) released August 1992
- Giant Robo Volume 2 (ISBN 4-04-852441-0) released September 1993

A novelization by Hiroshi Yamaguchi was released in September 1993. (Kadokawa Sneaker Bunko: ISBN 4-04-413104-X)

The Day the Earth Burned Volume 1

In commemoration of Giant Robo's 40th anniversary, Imagawa began scripting Giant Robo: The Day the Earth Burned (ジャイアント・ロボ — 地球の燃え尽きる日, Jaianto Robo Chikyū no Moetsukiru Hi). The manga, illustrated by Yasunari Toda, was serialized in Akita Shoten's Champion Red between September 2006 and January 2011. It chronicles Daisaku's involvement in a three-way battle between the IPO, the Magnificent Ten and the Murasame Clan. The Day the Earth Burned follows the general tone and style of the OVA, but takes place in a reality separate from that of the OVA; The Day the Earth Burned explores what the OVA did not: the true nature of the GR Project and the true leader of Big Fire, Big Fire himself.

1. ISBN 978-4-253-23231-9 (released on March 20, 2007)
2. ISBN 978-4-253-23232-6 (released on September 20, 2007)
3. ISBN 978-4-253-23233-3 (released on March 19, 2008)
4. ISBN 978-4-253-23234-0 (released on September 19, 2008)
5. ISBN 978-4-253-23235-7 (released on April 20, 2009)
6. ISBN 978-4-253-23236-4 (released on September 18, 2009)
7. ISBN 978-4-253-23237-1 (released on May 20, 2010)
8. ISBN 978-4-253-23238-8 (released on November 19, 2010)
9. ISBN 978-4-253-23239-5 (released on April 20, 2011)

The Giant Robo video game (SLPM-62526) was released for PlayStation 2 on November 3, 2004, by D3 Publisher. Set in The Day the Earth Stood Still continuity, the player leads Daisaku Kusama and Giant Robo on a quest to defeat the BF Group. As Daisaku, the player can pick up items and power-ups on the battlefield; as Giant Robo, the player does battle with other mechas. A Versus Mode allows players to compete against each other using any of the robots featured on the series. The game is not available in Europe or North America.

Mighty Gin Rei: Final Fight (COCC-12444), an audio drama sequel to the Mighty Gin Rei OVA, was released on April 21, 1995, by Nippon Columbia. Love Fight, a music collection tie-in, was released the same day.

== Reception ==
The final installment of Giant Robo was released on January 25, 1998, eight years after production began and a full decade since its inception. The feature suffered from high running costs and low sales, but was better received in America. The series appeared in the 62nd position of Animage's Top 100 Anime List, published in January 2001. In July of the same year, the series appeared on a list of the all time top 50 anime, according to Wizard Magazine.

Critical reception has been largely positive. Hyper magazine rated it 10 out of 10 in 1996. Three different reviewers from the AnimeOnDVD site gave Giant Robo an "A+". John Huxley of Anime Boredom "highly recommends" the series and Anime Academy gives it a grade of 88%.

Giant Robo has been called "one of the true timeless classics of Anime." Mike Crandol of Anime News Network says Imagawa "takes the best of the old and mixes it with the best of the new to create the definitive giant robot story." John Huxley of Anime Boredom concludes the series is "the super robot show as it was in your mind's eye, a perfect combination of the old without the disappointment of reality."

The Encyclopedia of Science Fiction described Giant Robo: The Day the Earth Stood Still as an exciting and visually impressive show, considering it one of the most memorable anime productions of the 1990s despite its limited success in Japan. It praised the series' vivid action sequences while emphasizing that its narrative is fundamentally character-driven, particularly through its recurring themes of sacrifice and relationships between fathers and their children, with comparatively little attention given to mothers. The encyclopedia also highlighted the production's role as a tribute to manga creator Mitsuteru Yokoyama, incorporating characters from numerous works throughout his career. It noted that the series' central conflict explores scientific responsibility and the manipulation of historical truth, while its unresolved subplot concerning the BF Group ends on a cliffhanger.
