= Toshio Maeda =

Japanese manga artist

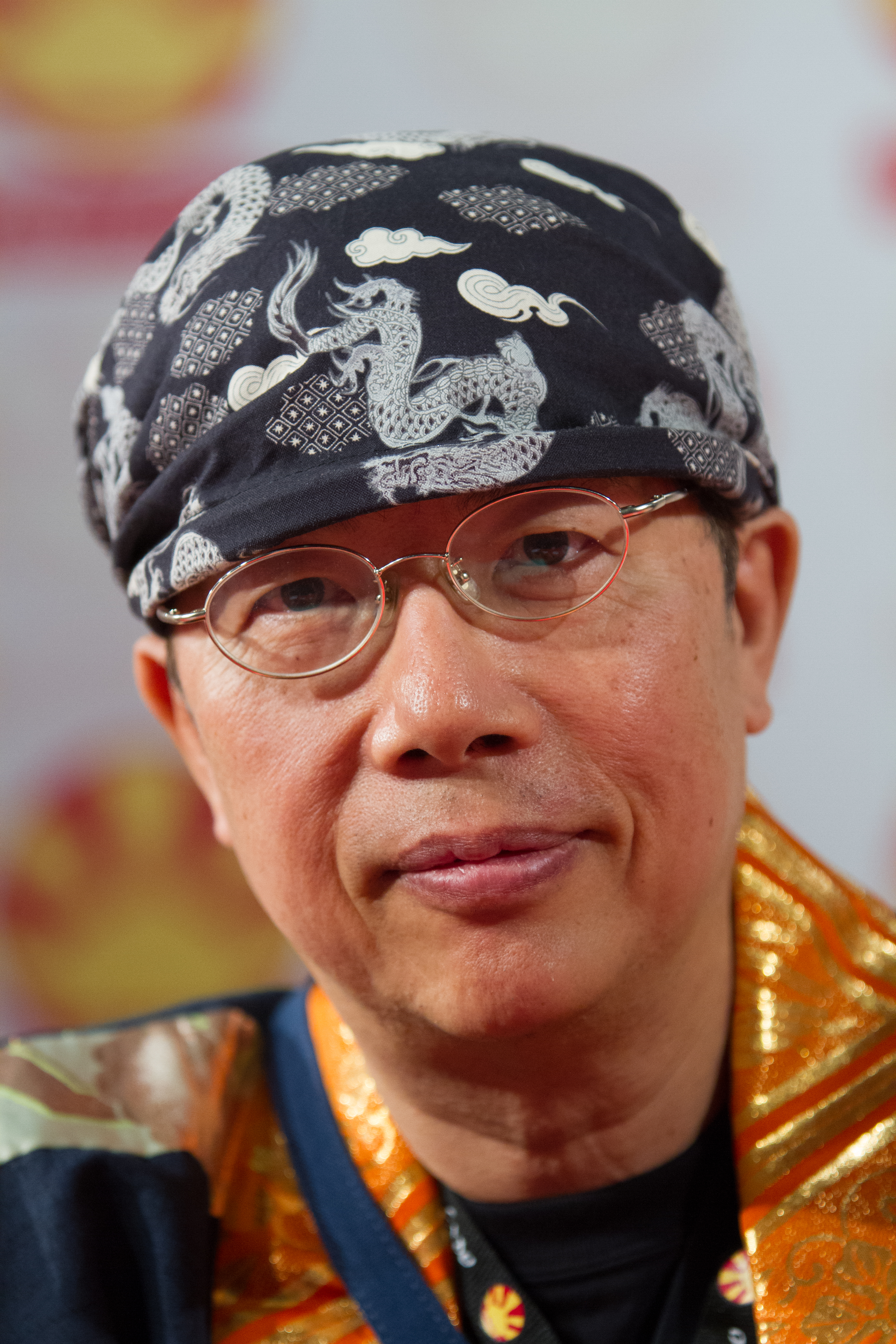
- Toshio Maeda at Japan Expo 2012
- Born: September 17, 1953 (age 73) Osaka, Japan
- Area: Manga artist
- Notable works: Urotsukidōji; La Blue Girl; Demon Beast Invasion; Adventure Kid

Toshio Maeda (前田俊夫, Maeda Toshio; born September 17, 1953) is an erotic manga artist who was prolific in the 1980s and '90s. Several of Maeda's works have been used as a basis for original video animations (OVA) including La Blue Girl, Adventure Kid, Demon Beast Invasion, Demon Warrior Koji and his most notorious work, Urotsukidōji (Legend of the Overfiend). An interviewer commented that Urotsukidōji "firmly placed him in the history books—in Japan and abroad—as the pioneer of the genre known as hentai, or "perverted".

== Early career ==
Toshio Maeda began reading manga when he was 5 or 6 years old, as well as American comics such as Mighty Mouse, Spider-Man and Batman. He was also a reader of all genres of literature and has said that he read more than 10,000 books before he was 20 years old.

== Career ==
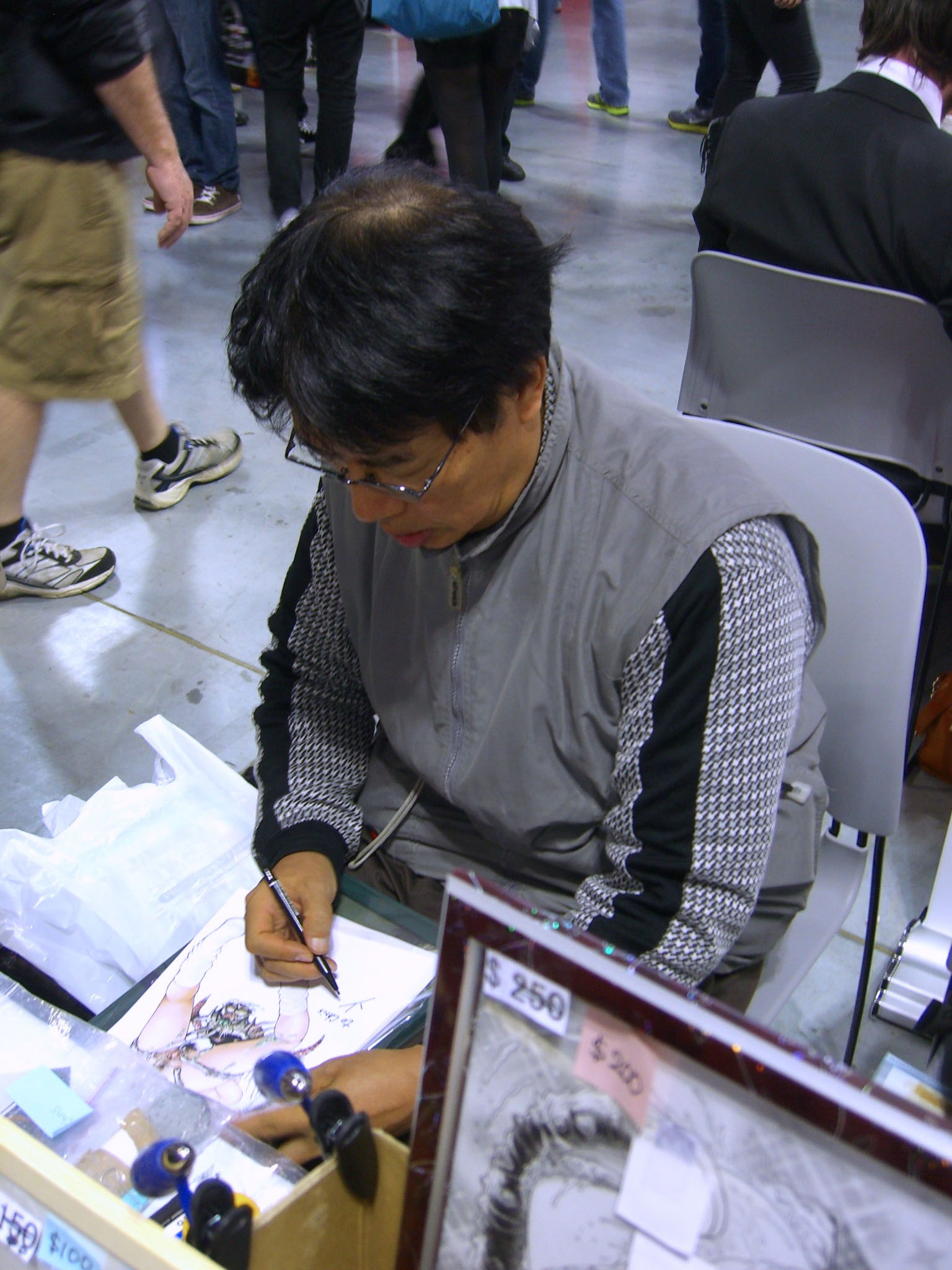
Maeda sketching at the 2012 New York Comic Con

At 16 Maeda left Osaka to go to Tokyo as an assistant to a professional cartoonist. He became interested in manga for adults to avoid all the sexual, political and religious restrictions that were placed on manga for children.

Early in his career, with the likes of Evil Spirit Island and Ashita-e Kick Off, he only provided the illustrations while someone else wrote the text for the manga. He worked as an assistant to fellow manga artist, Kenji Nanba, who himself was a disciple of Takao Saito and helped mentor Maeda into becoming a mangaka.

Maeda is credited with the proliferation of the tentacle rape genre. Maeda's first usage of tentacles in his manga was in 1976, in an experimental short story published in the magazine Special Young Comic titled SEX Tearing. The reason for drawing tentacles in the story was that Maeda was not allowed to draw male genitals.

Maeda's best known series, Urotsukidōji, came out in 1986 and gained popularity abroad. The Erotic Anime Movie Guide (1998) claimed that "No other title apart from Akira has been so influential in the English-language market". Maeda was working for an adult magazine at the time and wanted to create something different in terms of erotica.

Maeda has mentioned that since portraying genitals was illegal in Japan, artists would use any trick they could to get by the censors and he could say that a creature's tentacle was not a penis. Maeda has embraced his role in popularizing the genre and in a blog interview stated that he would like "Tentacle Master" inscribed on his tombstone.

In 1999, Maeda collaborated with Phoenix Entertainment (who previously adapted one of Maeda's works, Gedou Gakuen (or Nightmare Campus, as it is called overseas)) as an executive producer to work on a three episode OVA series, known as Kairaku Satsujin Chōsakan Koji (Sex Murder investigator Koji), also known in the west as Demon Warrior Koji.

Maeda was a Guest of Honor at the Big Apple Anime Fest (BAAF) held in New York City in October 2001. An ANN writer covering the story praised him as "the most influential erotic manga artist in Japan" and called Urotsukidoji "the foundation for the entire 'erotic-grotesque' genre of Japanese anime". Maeda was the Keynote Speaker at the BAAF Symposium and introduced a retrospective of his work.

A motorbike accident in 2001 left Maeda with limited ability in his drawing hand but he continued to use his computer to create characters and write scripts. In 2003, he planned contributions to a Japanese woman's hentai magazine and strove to look at eroticism from a woman's point of view.

In addition to erotic horror, Maeda has done manga in other genres, including sex comedy, BDSM-themed genres, and books targeted at younger readers. He also sometimes draws mecha.

As of September 2010, Toshio Maeda has opened his official website, the Tentacle club, where users can sign up and view his full length manga for a small monthly fee of 500 yen. Maeda has also made the opportunity available to the public to come stay at his apartment and have the opportunity to discuss manga, anime and Japan in general with him over a beer for a small fee, together with a tour of Akihabara and various otaku hot spots in Tokyo.

In 2016 Toshio Maeda appeared in the British horror film Spidarlings directed by Selene Kapsaski. Coinciding with Fakku's English release of the Urotsukidoji manga, Maeda appeared at a release party and exhibit at Floating World Comics in Portland, Oregon in December of 2016.

== Bibliography ==
- Kaiten Arashi (開店荒らし)
- Ashita-e Kick Off (明日へキックオフ) (1977), Hit Comics, 1 volume
- Akuryō Shima (悪霊島, Evil Spirit Island) (1981), Action Comics, 2 volumes
- Yokubō no Wana (欲望の罠, Trap of Desire) (1982), Comic Pack, 1 volume
- Yokubō no Rinbu (欲望の輪舞, Dance of Desire) (1983), Comic Pack, 1 volume
- Jigoku no Kiss (地獄のキッス, Hell's Kiss) (1983), Joy Comics, 1 volume
- Banquet of Desire (欲望の狂宴) (1984), Comic Pack, 1 volume
- Yokubō no Mokushiroku (欲望の黙示録, Apocalypse of Desire) (1986), Comic Pack, 1 volume
- Urotsukidōji (うろつき童子) (1986), Wanimagazine Comics, 6 volumes; English translation: Urotsukidoji: Legend of the Overfiend (1998), Urotsukidoji (2002)
- Fuuun Kurozukin (風雲黒頭巾) (1987), 3 volumes
- Chi no Wana (血の罠, Trap of Blood) (1987), 6 volumes
- Habu Ga Iku (HABUが行く) (1987), Wanimagazine Comics, 2 volumes
- Adventure Kid (アドベンチャーKID) (1988), Wanimagazine Comics, 4 volumes; English translation: Adventure Kid/Adventure Duo (2003)
- Gedō Gakuen Black Board Jungle (外道学園 Black Board Jungle, Nightmare Campus) (1988), Tsukasa Comics, 1 volume
- Yumechō Child (夢宙チャイルド, Dream-Realm Child) (1988), Tatsumi Comics, 1 volume
- Chōjū Densetsu (超獣伝説, Legend of the Superbeast) (1988), Million Comics, 1 volume
- Niku Man De Gō (肉マンでゴー, Meat Man Go!) (1988), Wani Books, 2 volumes
- Oni Gari (鬼狩り, Ogre Hunting) (1988), Pyramid Comics, 1 volume
- Yōjû Kyōshitsu Gakuen (妖獣教室) (1989), 2 volumes; English translation: Demon Beast Invasion (2001)
- Injuu Gakuen La Blue Girl (淫獣学園) (1989), Suberu Comics; English translation: La Blue Girl (2002)
- Injû no Tenshi (淫獣の天使) (1989), Men's Comics, 1 volume
- Yokoshima Seiken (邪聖剣ネクロマンサー, Wicked Sword Necromancer) (1989), Takarajima Comics, 1 volume
- Mado Senshi (魔童戦士) (1990), Tatsumi Comics, 1 volume
- Hajikareta Hōkago (弾かれた放課後) (1990), 1 volume
- Okkake Datenshi (おっかけ堕天使) (1990), Gekiga King Comics, 1 volume
- Kikō Jinruiten BODY (機甲人類伝BODY) (1991), Wanimagazine Comics, 2 volumes
- Magical Shimai (魔ジカル姉妹, Magical Sisters) (1991), 1 volume
- Shin Urotsukidōji (新うろつき童子, New Urotsukidōji) (1993), Action Camera Comics, 2 volumes
- Oni no Kotarō (鬼の小太郎) (1993), Suberu Comics, 2 volumes
- Rika to Jirainari (里香と地雷也) (1993), Suberu Comics, 1 volume
- Ryakudatsu Toshi (略奪都市) (1993), Suberu Comics, 2 volumes
- Korogari (ころがり釘次女体指南, Korogari) (1996), Core Comics, 4 volumes
- Kaikan Therapist (快感セラピスト, Pleasure Therapist) (1998), Kyun Comics, 1 volume
- Kairaku Shigotonin (快楽仕事人, Pleasure Salesman) (1999), Suberu Comics DX, 1 volume

== Sources ==
- Clements, Jonathan; McCarthy, Helen (2006). The Anime Encyclopedia (Revised & Expanded ed.). Berkeley, CA: Stone Bridge Press. ISBN 1-933330-10-4.
- McCarthy, Helen; Clements, Jonathan (1998). The Erotic Anime Movie Guide. London: Titan Books. ISBN 9781852869465. OCLC 472970813.
