= The Geisha House =

1998 film by Kinji Fukasaku

- Film poster
- Directed by: Kinji Fukasaku
- Written by: Kaneto Shindo
- Produced by: Izumi Toyoshima; Takashi Kasuga; Noriko Koyanagi
- Starring: Maki Miyamoto; Junko Fuji; Kaho Minami
- Cinematography: Daisaku Kimura
- Edited by: Koichi Sonoi
- Music by: Masamichi Amano
- Distributed by: Toei Company
- Release date: January 15, 1999 (Japan)
- Running time: 113 minutes
- Country: Japan
- Language: Japanese

The Geisha House (Japanese: おもちゃ, Hepburn: Omocha) is a 1998 drama film directed by Kinji Fukasaku.

== Plot ==
In 1958, the Anti-Prostitution Law is about to be implemented. A young maiko named Tokiko works at Fujinoya Geisha House under Madam Satoe with the geisha Terucho, Kimiryo, and Somemaru. Over the course of her daily errands she witnesses Terucho becoming angry with Kimiryo for sleeping with one of her clients at the Momoyama Hotel and sees striking workers at Hinod Taxi being beaten by hired thugs.

The tailor Mr. Yoshikawa, who has been Madam Satoe's patron for ten years, stop visiting her at the request of his wife and daughter. Mr. Yoshikawa's son and his friends visit the geisha house and are entertained by Terucho. They explain to her that Mrs. Yoshikawa is the heiress to her family's wealth and may cut him off but Terucho tells them that Mr. Yoshikawa should continue to pay Madam Satoe 200,000 yen each month if he really loves her.

Tokiko visits her home and finds that her sister Fujiko has left school in order to work with her mother, while her unemployed brother Sadao simply drinks without searching for work or helping his family. Yamashita, who is working at the sawmill while on break from his school, visits. He and Tokiko eat rice cakes together in town while they discuss their respective futures.

Mr. Yoshikawa's son visits Terucho again and they have sex. When Mr. Yoshikawa finds out, he slaps Terucho and severs ties completely with Madam Satoe. His son tells Terucho that it was part of his plan to get his Mr. Yoshikawa to leave Madam Satoe, then rapes her. She later tells him that she has filed a report with the police and is taking him to court, which his father fears will hurt his reputation because he is already engaged to someone.

Michiko, a bar owner, borrows money from Madam Satoe to lend to the father of her young son Ichiro, but he disappears and returns to his hometown. Michiko does not know where it is, even though she has been his concubine for 15 years.

The geisha madam Hanaman offers to help with the 5-million-yen expenses for Tokiko's new kimono and debut party as a maiko in exchange for half of the 3-million-yen fee from her first client and sponsor, the wealthy 78-year-old Mr. Tamura, before a patron is found later. Madam Satoe sells her body to a new patron in exchange for the remaining 1 million yen that she needs. Hanaman gives Tokiko the geisha name "Omocha", meaning "toy", and she makes her debut and keeps her appointment with Mr. Tamura.

== Cast ==
- Maki Miyamoto as Tokiko a.k.a. Omocha
- Junko Fuji as Satoe
- Kaho Minami as Terucho
- Mai Kitajima as Somemaru
- Masahiko Tsugawa as Yoshikawa
- Yumiko Nogawa as Michiko
- Mariko Okada as Hanaman
- Takeshi Katō as Kitayama
- Noboru Mitani as Mikami
- Naomasa Rokudaira as Kayama
- Takashi Sasano as Kosaka
- Seizo Fukumoto as police detective

== Credits ==
- Produced by:
  - Kinji Fukasaku - planner
  - Takashi Kasuga - producer
  - Noriko Koyanagi - producer
  - Masao Sato - planner
  - Izumi Toyoshima - producer
- Art Direction: Yoshinobu Nishioka
- Assistant Director: Kenta Fukasaku
- Sound Department: Maiku Samata
- Gaffer: Kiyoto Ando

== Release ==
The film was shown in competition at the 1998 Tokyo International Film Festival. Maki Miyamoto won the award for Best Actress at the festival.
