= Poppoya =

- Theatrical poster for Poppoya (1999)
- Directed by: Yasuo Furuhata
- Screenplay by: Yoshiki Iwama
- Based on: Poppoya by Jirō Asada
- Produced by: Jun'ichi Shindō; Tan Takaiwa
- Starring: Ken Takakura; Shinobu Otake; Ryōko Hirosue
- Cinematography: Daisaku Kimura
- Edited by: Kiyoaki Saitō
- Music by: Ryoichi Kuniyoshi; Ryuichi Sakamoto
- Distributed by: Toei Company
- Release date: 5 June 1999 (Japan)
- Running time: 112 minutes
- Country: Japan
- Language: Japanese
- Box office: ¥3.49 billion ($30.6 million)

Poppoya (鉄道員(ぽっぽや), Poppoya (Note: The kanji spelling is from the word tetsudōin (鉄(てつ)道(どう)員(いん); railway worker), which is also the Japanese title of the Italian film The Railroad Man. The reading, Poppoya, comes from poppo (Japanese for a steam locomotive sound effect) and ya (屋; dealer; seller).)), also known as The Railroad Man, is a 1999 Japanese film directed by Yasuo Furuhata. It was Japan's submission to the 72nd Academy Awards for the Academy Award for Best Foreign Language Film, but was not accepted as a nominee. It was chosen as Best Film at the Japan Academy Prize ceremony. The film was the third-highest-grossing film of the year in Japan.

== Synopsis ==
A railway station master at a dying end-of-the-line village in Hokkaido is haunted by memories of his dead wife and daughter. When the line serving the village is scheduled for closure, an erstwhile colleague offers him a job at a resort hotel, but he is emotionally unable to part with his career as a railwayman. His life takes a turn when he meets a young woman with an interest in trains who resembles his daughter.

== Cast ==
- Ken Takakura: Otomatsu Satō
- Shinobu Otake: Shizue Satō
- Ryōko Hirosue: Yukiko Satō
- Hidetaka Yoshioka: Hideo Sugiura
- Masanobu Ando: Toshiyuki Yoshioka
- Ken Shimura: Hajime Yoshioka
- Hirotarō Honda : Miner
- Tomoko Naraoka: Mune Katō
- Yoshiko Tanaka: Akiko Sugiura
- Nenji Kobayashi: Senji Sugiura

== See also ==
- Cinema of Japan
- List of submissions to the 72nd Academy Awards for Best Foreign Language Film
- List of Japanese submissions for the Academy Award for Best Foreign Language Film
