= Masamichi Amano =

Japanese composer, arranger and conductor

- Born: January 26, 1957 (age 69); Akita, Japan
- Other names: Masamicz Amano, Yoshi, Yoshi.Hoka
- Occupations: composer, conductor

Masamichi Amano (天野 正道, Amano Masamichi; born January 26, 1957 in Akita, Akita) is a Japanese music composer, arranger and conductor. He studied at the Kunitachi College of Music in Tokyo and completed master's degree in 1982.

== Biography ==
He graduated from Akita Minami High School and went on to study at Kunitachi College of Music, where he began a wide range of activities from classical and contemporary music to jazz, rock, folk music and songs. In 1980, he graduated first in his class in composition and was awarded the Takeoka Prize for excellence. After graduation, he went to Australia and became the first Japanese to master the Fairlight CMI (Computer Musical Instrument) and one of the founders of computer music in Japan. Since then, he has created music for many artists' albums, films, animations, videos, and many commercials and TV programs. His orchestral works include the musical scores of Battle Royale, Giant Robo and Stratos 4. The films and TV series featuring his music are genres action, science fiction, Hentai, and horror. Amano's orchestra of choice is Poland's Warsaw Philharmonic Orchestra (and its associated choir).

After presenting his own compositions at the Tokyo Music Festival World Convention in 1983 and 1984, and at a special guest performance in 1988, he has served as musical director and conductor for numerous events.

He has composed many pieces for wind ensemble that are recorded by the Tokyo Kosei Wind Orchestra and performed by bands at the All-Japan Band Association competitions. since 2015, he has been arranging and conducting New Sounds in Brass, succeeding the late Naohiro Iwai.

In 2017, the 60th Anniversary Concert Tour of Masamichi Amano was held throughout Japan (Akita, Tokyo, Kawasaki, Fukuoka, Kawagoe). He received the 23rd (2000) and 24th (2001) Japan Academy Prize for Excellence in Music. He received the 10th (2000) Academy Award of the Japan Band Association in the Composition and Arrangement Division.

He is a regular member of the Japan Music Rights Association (JASRAC), a member of the International Society for Contemporary Music (ISCM), a member of the 21st Century Windband "Kyoen", a special lecturer at Shobi Music College, and a visiting professor at Tokyo College of Music.

== Compositions ==
=== Orchestra ===
- Métamorphosées pour Ka-Den-Syo (2001)
- "MK" Selection -road To The Greatest Champion- (2006)
- Save This World ~Orchestra Version~ (2006)
- Three Fragments from Phantasy Star Universe (2008)
- Symphonic Poem "Infinite Space" (2009)
- Fanfare pour la Fêtê du 85e.Anniversaire Shobi (2010)

=== Symphonic Suites ===
- Morceau par 1e. Suite Symphonique
- Morceau par 2e. Suite Symphonique "GR"
- Morceau par 3e. Suite Symphonique "GR"
- Morceau par 4e. Suite Symphonique "FI"
- Morceau par 5e. Suite Symphonique "NR"
- Morceau par 6e. Suite Symphonique "PN"
- Morceau par 7e. Suite Symphonique "BR"
- Morceau par 8e. Suite Symphonique "SIN"
- Morceau par 9e. Suite Symphonique "The Aurora"
- Morceau par 10e. Suite Symphonique "BR2"
- Morceau par Suite Symphonique "MK2"

=== Wind Band ===
- Expiation "Atonement" (commissioned by Fujimura Girls' Junior and Senior High School Brass Band) (1999)
- Radiance and Meditation in Two Parts (Commissioned work for the 2nd Symphonic Band for the 21st Century "Kyoen") (1999)
- Bugaku (first performance at Tokyo Metropolitan Nagayama High School) (1999)
- Music for imaginary ballet No. 2 (2000)
- Yu-gyou-chu-kan: Azuma Kagami-ibun (commissioned by Fujimura Girls' Junior and Senior High School Brass Band) (2000)
- From Oppression to Liberation (2000)
- The Book of Exodus (2001)
- Metamorphoses (2001)
- Ohonai ～Homage to the Great Hanshin-Awaji Earthquake of January 17, 1995～ (commissioned by the Eastern Area Band of the Ground Self-Defense Force) (2001)
- Concerto Grosso for Big Band and Saxophone Quartet (2002)
- Una obertura espagnol falsa "El Jardin de los Recuerdos" (2002)
- La forme de shaque amour chonge comme le kaleidoscope (2003)
- La Suite Éxcentrique (Commissioned work for Saitama Prefectural Yono High School Symphonic Band) (2003)
- Fanfare Symphonique (Commissioned work for Fukuoka University Symphonic Band) (2004)
- Alas de Hierro - Requiem for the young warriors scattered in the Void (Commissioned work for Kagoshima J.S.B. Symphonic Band) (2004)
- Structures II (2004)
- Tobiume ni nosete (Commissioned work for the 19th National Cultural Festival Fukuoka, Fukuoka Brass Band Federation) (2004)
- Legenda y Regenea Cea (2004)
- 5 fragments from Stratos 4
- Kodo: Hometown (commissioned work for the 30th anniversary of the Akita Wind Orchestra) (2005)
  1. Children's Song
  2. Spring Festival
  3. Drumming
- Chushingura-ibun (commissioned work for the 50th anniversary of NTT East Tokyo Symphonic Band) (2007)
- Symphony Suite "Gaia" in 2 movements (2007)
- Fantôme de l'Amour (2007)
- La Porte d'une Famille (Commissioned work for Toyama Minami Brass Band) (2008)
- Capuleti and Montecchi "Romeo and Juliet" - The Love and the Death (2008)
- Dream for Tomorrow (Commissioned work for Adachi Municipal No.14 Junior High School Brass Band) (2009)
- Concert music (Commissioned work for the 30th Anniversary of Kasuga Municipal Symphonic Band) (2009)
- Adagio Słowiańskie (2009)
- Deux Situations (Commissioned work for Soka Gakkai Kansai Symphonic Band) (2010)
- Hiroshima Brill El Sol (Commissioned work for Hiroshima General Symphonic Band Association) (2010)
- The Fragrance of Flowers: Cherry Blossoms, Laurel Blossoms, Roses (2011)
- Embu Dan Kim Fantasy ~ Azuma Kagami Ibun ~ (Commissioned work for Nagano Prefectural Nagano Nishi High School Brass Band) (2011)
- Caprice (2011)
- Euscaphis Japonica (2012)
- Green ~ Etude for Microtones, Clusters, Sound Density Convergence and Diffusion (2013)
- Deuxième Série Harmonique (2014)
- Lettres le Néon - Sartre and Beauvoir: Philosophy, Love, and New Form of Love (Commissioned work for Koshigaya Nishi High School Symphonic Band) (2014)
- Sandalwood ~ Soundscape for Polytempo, Polytonal, Polyrhythm and Multi-dimensional Micro Ensemble (2014)
- Structures III (2014)
- Tragiczny sonata na źrebaka i płowe (2014)
- Ten rai mu bou (Commissioned work for Hamamatsu Symphony Orchestra 40th Anniversary) (2014)
- "Shizuku" for Wind Ensemble (2015)
- Cinema Chimérique (2015)
- And the stillness fades to the woods (2015)
- Profondum ~ Underground (2016)
- Preludio Espressiva (2016)
- Version remix pour la Forme de Chaque Amour Change comme le Kaleidoscope (commissioned by Graal Wind Orchestra) (2016)
- Paraphrase par "Statique et Extatique" avec un Prologue et Épilogue (2016)
- Amabile (Commissioned work for Toke Civic Wind Orchestra) (2016)
- Jeu Chimérique (Commissioned work for Toke Civic Wind Orchestra) (2016)
- Hirata Fantasy: Sixteen Islands ~Hirata Festival ~ Inome Cave ~ Hole in the Yellow Springs ~ Nuto-Gotama-Gami (Commissioned work for Hirata Junior High School in Izumo City) (2016)
- L'être-pour-autrui (2017)
- Endosymbiotic Transformation (2017)
- The Girl of Orléans (commissioned by Bunkyo University Symphonic Band) (2019)
- Go gyo so koku (commissioned work for Hamamatsu Symphonic Band) (2019)
- Haran Banjyo (2021)
- Retro (2022)
- Espoir pour l'avenir (commissioned work for the 70th anniversary of Kyushu Band Association) (2025)
- Kobe no Kaoru Kaze (commissioned work for Hyogo Prefectural Kobe High School Brass Band) (2025)

=== Symphonies ===
- Symphony No. 1 "Gral" for Wind Orchestra
  1. Fantôme De l'amour
  2. ¿Estilo de España por qué?
  3. Adagio Słowiańskie
  4. Rondo – Coda

=== Symphonic Suites for Wind Band ===
- Morceau par 1e. Suite Symphonique
- Morceau par 2e. Suite Symphonique "GR"
  - There is also "Train Chase Edition" which is based on the same piece, that is Symphonic Suites No.2, but has different composition.
- Morceau par 3e. Suite Symphonique "GR"
- Morceau par 4e. Suite Symphonique "FI"
- Morceau par 5e. Suite Symphonique "NR"
- Morceau par 6e. Suite Symphonique "PN"
- Morceau par 7e. Suite Symphonique "BR"
- Morceau par 8e. Suite Symphonique "SIN"
- Morceau par 9e. Suite Symphonique "The Aurora" pour l'orchestre de vent
- Morceau par 10e. Suite Symphonique "BR2"
- Morceau par Suite Symphonique "MK2"
- Suite Symphonique "GAIA"
  1. De la naissance de la terre au commencement de civilisation du monde
  2. Le mouvement qui considère l'influence que l'humanité cause à l'environnement terrestre - Développement de civilisation, guerre et effondrements -
  3. Le mouvement a offert à toutes les victimes de guerre dans l'histoire de la terre
  4. Finale
- Symphonic Selections from "GR"
- Suite Symphonique "GR" "The Day the Earth Stood Still

=== Concerto ===
- Timpani Concerto
- Euphonium Concerto
- Alto Saxophone Concerto
- Small Concerto for Electric Violin, Electric Guitar & Orchestra
- Trois impressions pour Euphonium et Harmonie 2007
- Ballade pour Saxophone alto 2010
- Concerto for 4 JUNO-STAGE and Wind Orchestra 2011

=== Chamber music ===
- Asōgi (Alto Fl., Shinobue, Violin, Contrabass, Piano, 2 Percussions)
- Autumn Rhyme I - VI (Synthesizer & Vocoder, Harp, Piano, Percussion)
- Ciel d'Automne
- Impromptu
- Aioi Soshiku, Book II (Piccolo, 17-string Koto)
- Structures (Wind Octet & Percussion )
- 3e. Ballet Chimérique (Wind Octet and Percussion)
- Battle No. 2 (Saxophone Quintet)
- "Pentagon" for 5 percussionists
- Sonorité et Mouvements (Percussion Quintet)
- And the Stillness Fades to the Woods (Percussion Octet)
- The Rose of Strawberry Fields - Longing for Imagine (Percussion Octet)
- Le Chaos et L'Harmonie (Wind Sextet and percussion)
- Six Angels in the Sky (Flute Sextet)
- Couleur et Movements (Flute Quintet)
- "Tatsumi Tamekaze" for Brass Octet
- Fantastique Elegie (1991)
- Pieśń Drwala i Wiejska Zabawa (1991)
- Vib Letter (1991)
- Kwartet smyczkowy Sur le nom de BACEWICZ et SZYMANOWSKI (1992)
- Fantaja (1994)
- String Quartet No. 1 "Twilight of the Heroes" (1994)
- Florata (1999)
- Dowcip (2001)
- La Forme de Chaque Amour (2002)
- Trois Pieses (2002)
- Kaleidoscope (2002)
- Octagon (2003)
- Quatuor (2003)
- Cori spezzati (2004)
- Deux danses for Clarinet Octet (2004)
- l'Incohérent (2004)
- Thanatos (2005)
- Romance sur le nom de André Henry (2005)
- La marée et l'algue (2005)
- LA (2006)
- Fantaisie de Cantus sur le nom de KANA et REIKO (2006)

== Soundtracks ==
=== Anime ===
Year	Title
1983	Miyuki (manga)
1983	Urusei Yatsura: Only You
1985	Odin: Photon Sailer Starlight
1986	Nayuta
1987	Urotsukidōji
1987	The Flying Luna Clipper
1988	Adventure Kid
1992 - 1998	Giant Robo: The Day the Earth Stood Still
1992	Watch and become stronger! Yokozuna Anime Aah! Harimanada
1995	Super Atragon: Shin Kaitei Gunkan
1995	Ruin Explorers: Hikyou Tanken Fam & Ihrlie
1996	The Legend of the Blue Wolves
1997-1998	Ninja Resurrection
1998-1999	Hell Teacher Nūbē
1998	Princess Nine Kisaragi Girls High Baseball Club
1999	Tenamonya Voyagers
1999	Melty Lancer: The Animation
2000	Sin: The Movie
2000	Maetel Legend
2001	6 Angels
2001	Shiawase Sou no Okojo-san
2003	Stratos 4
2003	Sensitive Pornograph

=== Game ===
Year	Title
1998	Radiant Silvergun
1998	Quest 64
2003	Phantasy Star Online Episode III: C.A.R.D. Revolution
2004	Onimusha 3: Demon Siege
2006	Phantasy Star Universe
2007	Mario & Sonic at the Olympic Games
2007	Nights: Journey of Dreams
2009	Infinite Space
2013	Saint Seiya Online

=== Movies ===
Year	Title
1987	Passenger 過ぎ去りし日々 [VHS] (co-written with Kentaro Haneda)
1987	Hoshi no Makiba (co-written with Fumitaka Anzai and Koki Atsuta)
1989	Matasaburo of the Wind (co-written with Isao Tomita)
1990	殺しのメロディ〜Lady Smith [VHS]
1999	The Geisha House
2000	Umi no Aurora
2000	Battle Royale
2001	Musa
2003	Battle Royale II
2004	Nitaboh, the shamisen master
2005	Mushiking: The King of Beetles The Movie
2007	Mushiking: The King of Beetles SUPER BATTLE MOVIE -Altered Beetles of Darkness-
2012	Django Unchained
