= Daisaku Kimura =

Japanese film director and cinematographer

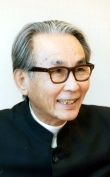
- Daisaku Kimura
- Born: July 13, 1939 (age 87); Tokyo-Fu, Japan
- Occupations: Film director, cinematographer

Daisaku Kimura (木村 大作, Kimura Daisaku) is a Japanese film director and cinematographer.

== Overviews ==
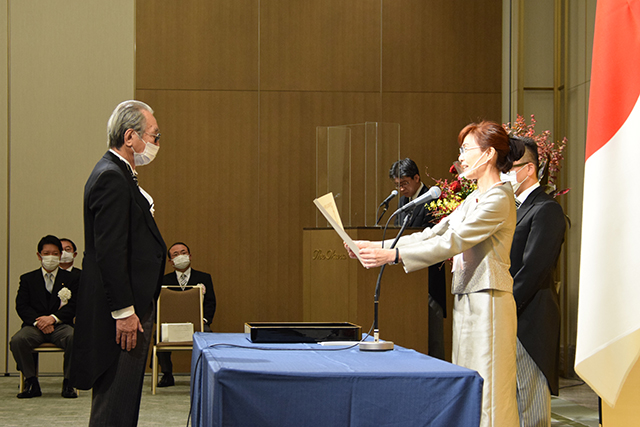
Kimura received the certificate of the Person of Cultural Merit from Hinako Yokota (November 4, 2020)

He won the award for best director at the 33rd Japan Academy Film Prize ceremony for Mt. Tsurugidake.

== Filmography ==
=== Cinematographer ===
- The Black Battlefront Kidnappers (1973)
- Submersion of Japan (1973)
- Aoba shigereru (1974)
- The Beast Must Die: Mechanic of Revenge (1974)
- Tokkan (1975)
- Akan ni hatsu (1975)
- Mount Hakkoda (1977)
- Sugata Sanshiro (1977)
- Blue Christmas (1978)
- Seishoku no ishibumi (1978)
- Yūrei ressha (1978)
- The Adventures of Kosuke Kindaichi (1979)
- Virus (1980)
- Station (1981)
- Kaikyō (1982)
- Shōsetsu Yoshida gakko (1983)
- Izakaya Chōji (1983)
- Time of Wickedness (1985)
- Yasha (1985)
- House on Fire (1986)
- Night Train (1987)
- Too Much (1987)
- Wakarenu Riyū (1987)
- Labyrinth Romanesque (1988)
- A Chaos of Flowers (1988)
- Anego (1988)
- Yakuza Ladies 3 (1989)
- Buddies (1989)
- Yakuza Ladies: The Final Battle (1990)
- Isan Sōzoku (1990)
- Lady Kasuga (1990)
- Yakuza Ladies Revisited (1991)
- Ryakudatsu ai (1991)
- Kantsubaki (1992)
- Tengoku no Taizai (1992)
- Yakuza Ladies Revisited 2 (1993)
- Bloom in the Moonlight (1993)
- Yakuza Ladies: Blood Ties (1995)
- A Brief Message from the Heart (1995)
- Kiri no shigosen (1996)
- Yakuza Ladies: Dangerous Gamble (1996)
- Waga kokoro no ginga tetsudo: Miyazawa Kenji monogatari (1996)
- Yukai (1997)
- Diary of Early Winter Shower (1998)
- The Geisha House (1998)
- Poppoya (1999)
- The Firefly (2001)
- Dawn of a New Day: The Man Behind VHS (2002)
- Akai Tsuki (2004)
- Riding Alone for Thousands of Miles (2005)
- The Haunted Samurai, aka Tsukigami (2007)
- Mt. Tsurugidake (2009)
- A Chorus of Angels (2012)
- Climbing to Spring (2014)
- Reminiscence (2017)
- Samurai's Promise (2018)
- Minato no Hikari (2025)

=== Director ===
- Mt. Tsurugidake (2009)
- Climbing to Spring (2014)
- Samurai's Promise (2018)
- Hara o Kukutte (2027)

=== Writer ===
- Mt. Tsurugidake (2009, co-writer)
- Climbing to Spring (2014, co-writer)

== Honours ==
- Person of Cultural Merit (2020)
