= Urotsukidōji =

Japanese manga series

- Cover of the 2004 reprint of the first manga volume

うろつき童子 (Chōjin Densetsu Urotsukidōji)
- Genre: Erotic horror, horror, supernatural
- Manga
- Written by: Toshio Maeda
- Published by: Wanimagazine
- English publisher: NA: CPM Manga (former); Fakku
- Magazine: Manga Erotopia
- Original run: 25 July 1985 – 24 July 1986
- Volumes: 6 (original); 4 (reissue)
- Original video animation
- Directed by: Hideki Takayama; Shigenori Kageyama (Note: Credited as Yōsei Morino)
- Produced by: Yasuhito Yamaki; Eiichi Yamamoto
- Written by: Shō Aikawa (Note: Credited as Gorō Sanyō); Nobuaki Kishima
- Music by: Masamichi Amano
- Studio: Japan Audiovisual Network (eps. 1–5); Project Team Mu (Note: In 1992, Project Team Mu was split into two companies: Mu Animation Studio and Phoenix Entertainment.) (eps. 1–5); West Cape Corporation (Note: The first two parts (episodes 1 to 5) were produced by the West Cape Corporation's subsidiary Japan Audiovisual Network. After the dissolution of the Japan Audiovisual Network, West Cape Corporation itself took over the production of the remainder of the series.) (eps. 6–13); Mu Animation Studio (eps. 6–12); Studio Take-Off (ep. 13)
- Released: 21 January 1987 – 28 December 1996
- Runtime: 45–60 minutes (each)
- Episodes: 13
- Anime parts
- Part I: Legend of the Overfiend (episodes 1 to 3); Part II: Legend of the Demon Womb (episodes 4 and 5); Part III: Return of the Overfiend (episodes 6 to 9); Part IV: Inferno Road (episodes 10 to 12); Part V: The Final Chapter (episode 13)
- Original video animation

New Saga
- Directed by: Hidetoshi Omori (Note: Credited as Dan Kongoji)
- Produced by: Yasuto Yamaki
- Written by: Kensei Date
- Music by: Masamichi Amano
- Studio: Phoenix Entertainment; Digital Works (Note: Credited as Heavy Water)
- Released: 3 May 2002 – 15 November 2002
- Episodes: 3

Urotsukidōji (Japanese: うろつき童子; lit. "The Wandering Child") is a Japanese erotic horror manga series written and illustrated by Toshio Maeda.

First serialized in Manga Erotopia from 1985 to 1986, Urotsukidōji marked a departure from Maeda's earlier works, with its focus on erotica, dark humor, and the supernatural. Starting in 1987, the manga was adapted into a series of original video animation (OVA) anime releases by director Hideki Takayama. The adaptations deviate significantly from the manga, adding elements of violence, sadomasochism, and rape not present in the source material.

Urotsukidōji has been credited with popularizing the trope of tentacle rape, and The Erotic Anime Movie Guide calls it a formative work in the hentai genre. In 2005, it was voted as one of the 100 greatest cartoons in a poll by Channel 4.

The animation team who worked on the series would later become best known for their work on Giant Robo: The Day the Earth Stood Still.

== Synopsis ==
=== Manga ===
Amano Jyaku, a mischievous, sociopathic demon/human hybrid, is banished to Earth and ordered by The Great Elder to find the Chōjin: the unbeatable god of the demon world who is hiding within the body of a man. He eventually turns on the Chojin in the fifth installment, after the Chojin reveals his true plans to exterminate the humans, demons and man-beasts.

A group of reptilian/amphibian/insectoid demons want to find the Chōjin and use his power on behalf of the Queen of Demons. Under the leadership of Suikakuju, the Elder's rival and lover of his estranged wife, the Queen of Demons, they hatch a series of plots to try to capture the Chōjin, most of which go horribly wrong.

Amano is sent to protect the Chōjin, but after his lecherous friend Koroko and then later his nymphomaniac sister Megumi come to find him, this proves to be more difficult.

=== Anime ===
Every 3,000 years the human world (人間界, Ningenkai) is united with the demon world (魔界, Makai) and the man-beast world (獣人界, Jūjinkai) by the revival of the Overgod (超神, Chōjin, known as the Overfiend in the English version). The saga follows Jyaku Amano—a man-beast—and his quest to find the Chōjin and to ensure the safe future of all three worlds. However, he finds his beliefs put to the test when he encounters numerous demons, who plan to destroy the Chōjin and prevent the three worlds from joining.

== Characters ==
As the Urotsukidōji saga spans over a number of years it incorporates a wide variety of characters. Below is a list of the main characters, which are split into their races:

=== Ningen (Humans) ===
Tatsuo Nagumo (南雲 辰夫, Nagumo Tatsuo)
The human through which the Chōjin would be reborn. He is shy and lecherous. Fated to mutate into the Demon of Destruction who decimates the world to pave the way for the birth of his "messianic" offspring.
Akemi Itō (伊藤 明美, Itō Akemi)
In the anime, she is presented as a young, innocent, naive girl, and the idol at Myōjin University. In the manga, she is sometimes shown as more sexually adventurous. She becomes Nagumo's girlfriend, and the mother of the Chōjin.
Takeaki Kiryū (桐生 武明, Kiryū Takeaki)
An anime-only character; Nagumo's cousin, whom Münchhausen II uses to resurrect the Kyō-Ō. He commits a series of rapes and murders under the control of the German diabolist, who contorts his mind against those he loves. He falls for Megumi Amano, only to be killed by her in the battle against Münchhausen II atop the Shinjuku skyscrapers.
Yūichi Niki (仁木 勇一, Niki Yūichi)
A school nerd who loves Akemi and jealously hates Nagumo. He is later used by Suikakujū as a vessel to destroy the Chōjin, with the aid of a demonic phallus which he promptly substitutes for his own. He meets his end at the hands of Nagumo, who tears out his organs.
Norikazu Ozaki (尾崎 則一, Ozaki Norikazu)
The jock all the girls fall for in Myōjin University. He is a major character in the manga, though is only seen in the first volume of the OVA series. Jyaku mistakes him for the Chōjin, which ultimately leads to his demise.
Yoichi Oba (大場洋一, Oba Yoichi)
A character who only appears in the manga, he is Niki's bodyguard and childhood friend. Although he appears to be morbidly obese, he is very strong and attacks anyone who bullies Niki. He later befriends Nagumo and Akemi after Niki ditches him.

=== Jūjin (Beast-men) ===
Jyaku Amano (天邪鬼, Amano Jaku)
The male protagonist of the saga, he has been searching for the Chōjin for three hundred years. He holds to his belief in the Chōjin and his Land of Eternity, until events play out in a way totally contrary to what he hoped for.
Megumi Amano (天野 恵, Amano Megumi)
Jyaku's nymphomaniac sister, she believes Tatsuo to be the Chōjin from the start. In the manga, her character is noticeably more malicious and antagonistic, where she tricks men into having sex with her only so she can either accuse them of rape and frame them for it, or eat them alive in her true monster form (which isn't in the anime) and develops a petty grudge towards Akemi all because Nagumo chose her over Megumi, even going as far as to summon the demon king of the sea to try and kill Akemi (albeit, unsuccessfully) while they are at the beach. Although sharing the same hair cut and love for sex, her personality in the anime has been changed where she is much more kind-hearted and empathetic, with none of her sociopathic traits from the manga being present and also given much more screentime compared to her role in the manga, where she only appears in two chapters. She also falls in love with Nagumo's cousin, Takeaki, in the anime.
The Great Elder (長老, Chōrō; Eldest)
An anime-only character. One of the wisest elders in the Man-Beast realm. In the anime, he helps Jyaku discover the truth behind the legend of the Chōjin. According to his own words in the second episode of the first OVA, The Great Elder has lived in the Man-Beast world for 993 years.
Mimi Tenno (ミミ, Mimi)
The Elder's granddaughter and lover of Jyaku Amano. Her orgasm has the power to project visions of the future.

=== Majin (Demons) ===
Suikakujū (水角獣)
Jyaku Amano's rival, and the Demon Queen's champion. His quest is to destroy the Chōjin in order to keep Makai (the "Demon World") intact.
Kohōki (虎鵬鬼)
A demon who was banished to Hell for having an affair with Megumi a century ago, he later becomes Münchhausen II's lackey. He is mortally wounded in battle with Amano and dies after rescuing Megumi. He is not featured in the manga.
Togami (栂見)
In the manga, Ms. Togami is a nymphomaniac teacher who gets possessed by an iguana-like demon. The demon then tries to seduce Akemi, until Jyaku manages to drive the iguana-like demon out. He later tricks her into having sex, so that his magical sperm can protect her from the lizardlike demons. In the anime it is not explained whether or not she is possessed or a demon in disguise; a demon sent to Earth to hunt (and presumably destroy) the Chōjin. Despite her mission, she still finds time to rape Akemi, but Amano Jyaku intervenes and destroys her.
Yoenki
An anime-only character. The sister of Suikakujū, she survives the merging of the three worlds, but is manipulated by Münchhausen II into believing that Amano Jyaku is responsible for her brother's death.
Goki, Yoki, and Sekki
Three demons searching for the Chōjin, who are later killed by Tatsuo. They appear only in the manga.

=== Makemono (Demon-Beasts) (anime only) ===
Buju
A key character in the post-apocalyptic chapters of the saga. Starts off as a raping, pillaging marauder, only to find some semblance of purpose and redemption in becoming the Kyō-Ō's guardian on his long journey toward Osaka to confront the Chōjin.
Gashim
A kindhearted, elderly makemono who accompanies Buju, Himi, Jyaku et al. to Osaka, following his release from Caesar's captivity.
Ruddle
Another makemono spared from the devastating effects of Kyō-Ō's Light of Judgment at Caesar's palace. Joins Jyaku and the other makemono in their journey toward Osaka.
Idaten
A pure-hearted makemono youth who takes the high road to Osaka with his fellows. He develops an unrequited crush on Himi. He is killed by Münchhausen II while attempting to defend Himi.

=== Other characters ===
Kuroko (黒子, Kuroko)
A member of the Kuroko, a tribe of diminutive gray humanoids capable of flight. He holds deep respect for his boss, Amano Jyaku.
Münchhausen II (ミュンヒハウゼン二世, Myunhihauzen-nisei)
An anime-only character. He is a sorcerer following the footsteps of his father, a member of the Vril Society who died in the service of Adolf Hitler, hell-bent on resurrecting the Kyō-Ō and dominating the world. He carries an orb which grants him the ability to control demons and counter Amano Jyaku's attacks. He initially tries to bend Takeaki to his will, but is defeated after Amano Jyaku mutilates him, forcing him to replace his lost body parts with mechanical prosthetics. He later adopts the pseudonym Faust and becomes an ally of Caesar. After Caesar is defeated, Münchhausen II finds Yoenki and uses her power to restore his body. He is finally killed by Himi when she unleashes her power.
Caesar
An anime-only character; a former businessman and leader of a hedonistic cult, he discovers the legend of the Chōjin and attempts to summon it prematurely, resulting in the death of his daughter Alector. He vows revenge and turns himself into a cyborg. After Nagumo destroys the three worlds, Caesar allies himself with Münchhausen II and becomes a dictator leading a mixed army of humans and Makai, using Makemono as slave labor. He attempts to summon the Kyō-Ō, but is sidetracked by Buju kidnapping his daughter, now resurrected as an android. He ultimately sees the error of his ways and leaves Earth with Alector on a space shuttle.
Mizuchi (蛟, Mizuchi)
An anime-only character. A supernatural being created by the Chōjin as part of a new race to both replace and exterminate the humans, Man-Beasts and demons. It has the ability to change its own gender whenever it wants, and it can also create other living beings and control the minds of other living beings into doing what it pleases. It appears in Urotsukidōji: The Final Chapter.
The Overfiend (超神, Chōjin; lit. The Overgod)
The God of Demons. His legend reveals that every three thousand years he will be reborn into the human realm. In the anime it is to unite the different worlds into a world of peace.
The Lord of Chaos (狂王, Kyō-Ō; The Mad King)
A deity worshipped by the Kuroko tribe, it is foretold to be the only being capable of defeating the Chōjin. Münchhausen II and Caesar both want to resurrect the Kyō-Ō and use it to take over the three worlds. The Kyō-Ō is conceived from the congealed blood of Takeaki at the Gokumon shrine, and comes to life as the baby girl Himi twenty years later after Buju rapes Alector in the shrine's vicinity. She accompanies Buju and the other Makemono on their journey to Osaka, during which she kills Münchhausen II and eventually defeats the false Chōjin.
The Sea Demon King (海の魔王, Umi no Maō; Demon King of the Sea)
The demon that Suikakujū summons from the sea to kill the Chōjin. In the anime, Suikakujū's summoning of the Sea Demon King in 1923 results in the Great Kantō earthquake.
Faburil
An anime-only character. An avian demon created by Caesar and Münchhausen II to merge with the Kyō-Ō and serve them.

== Anime cast ==
Character Role	Original Japanese version	English Dubbed version
Jyaku Amano	Tomohiro Nishimura	Christopher Courage (I–II); Daniel Flynn (Return of the Overfiend); Mark Blackburn (Inferno Road); Michael Sinterniklaas (New Saga)
Kuroko	Tsutomu Kashiwakura	Sonny Weil; B.G. Good (New Saga)
Tatsuo Nagumo	Hirotaka Suzuoki	Bill Timoney; Jake Eisbart (New Saga)
Norikazu Ozaki	Kenyuu Horiuchi	Bick Balse; Dan Green (New Saga)
Takeaki Kiryū	Yasunori Matsumoto	Jake La Can
Akemi Ito	Youko Asagami	Rebel Joy; Rebecca Handler (New Saga)
Megumi Amano	Maya Okamoto; Yumi Takada	Lucy Morales
Suikakujyu	Norio Wakamoto	Jurgen Offen
Yuichi Niki	Kouichi Yamadera	Bill Timoney
Münchhausen II/Faust	Demon Kogure; Ken Yamaguchi	Bick Balse
Great Elder	Daisuke Gori	Greg Puertolas
Alector	Yumi Takada	
Buju	Yasunori Matsumoto	
Gashim	Yoshio Kawai	
Idaten	Tsutomu Kashiwakura	
Caesar	Ryuzaburo Otomo	
D9	Ken Yamaguchi	

== Media ==
=== Manga ===
Urotsukidōji was first serialized in four special editions of the erotic manga magazine Manga Erotopia from 25 July 1985 to 24 July 1986. It was later released into six tankōbon volumes from 1 December 1986 to 1 April 1987.

Urotsukidōji: Legend of the Overfiend was first published in English with the launch of the adult label of CPM Manga in July 1998. It ran in a black-and-white 32-page format priced at $2.95 per issue. It was later released into six volumes from 1 September 2002 to 15 October 2003.

On 12 December 2014 English-language hentai publisher Fakku announced plans to launch a Kickstarter campaign to publish a remastered edition of the manga, which would include color pages and chapters omitted from the previous English versions. The campaign was launched on 20 June 2016. The campaign met its goal, and the first of four volumes was released on 8 December 2016.

=== Anime ===
There are four main arcs in the original Urotsukidōji saga, along with an unfinished fifth arc that has so far only been released in Japan and Germany, as well as a complete remake of the first chapter.

==== Series overview ====
Role	1987–89	1990–91	1992–93	1993–95	1996	2002
Role	Legend of the Overfiend	Legend of the Demon Womb	Return of the Overfiend	Inferno Road	The Final Chapter	New Saga
Role	#01–03	#04–05	#06–09	#10–12	#13	New Saga
Director	Hideki Takayama	Hideki Takayama	Hideki Takayama	Shigenori Kageyama	Hideki Takayama	Hidetoshi Omori
Producer	Yasuhito Yamaki	Yasuhito Yamaki	Yasuhito Yamaki	Yasuhito Yamaki	Eiichi Yamamoto	Yasuhito Yamaki
Series composition	Shō Aikawa	Shō Aikawa	Shō Aikawa	Nobuaki Kishima	Nobuaki Kishima	Kensei Date
Editor	Shigeru Nishiyama	Shigeru Nishiyama	Shigeru Nishiyama	Masaaki Hanai	Mari Kishi	Shigeru Nishiyama
Character designer	Eitaro Higashino	Akihiko Yamashita	Keiji Gotoh (Note: Credited as Ako Sahara)	Keiichi Satō (Note: Credited as Masato Muroi)	Aki Tsunaki	Hidetoshi Omori
Chief animation director	Hidetoshi Omori	Shirō Kasami	Rikizō Sekimae	Aki Tsunaki	Yasuhiro Saiki	Miyako Mizuno
Art director	Shigemi Ikeda	Hitoshi Nagao	Ken'ichi Harada Yūsuke Takeda	Hiroshi Kato	Kazushige Tōno	Akira Itō
Production companies	Japan Audiovisual Network	Japan Audiovisual Network	West Cape Corporation	West Cape Corporation	West Cape Corporation	Digital Works
Production companies	Project Team Mu	Project Team Mu	Mu Animation Studio	Mu Animation Studio	Studio Take-Off	Phoenix Entertainment

==== Legend of the Overfiend (1987–1989) ====
1. "Birth of the Overfiend" (超神誕生編, Chōjin Tanjō-hen) (21 January 1987) Penthouse: Volume 3
2. "Curse of the Overfiend" (超神呪殺篇, Chōjin Jusatsu-hen) (21 March 1988) Penthouse: Volume 44
3. "Final Inferno" (完結地獄篇, Kanketsu Jigoku-hen) (10 April 1989) Penthouse: Volume 58

The first series was released as part of an anthology video series distributed by JAVN (Japan Audio Visual Network). The anthology series was part of the international Penthouse Magazine brand and featured international and domestic pornographic movies (such as The Devil in Miss Jones, Behind the Green Door and The Opening of Misty Beethoven to name a few).

The first three-volume series within the larger Penthouse series was named Legend of the Overgod Urotsukidōji (超神伝説うろつき童子, Chōjin Densetsu Urotsukidōji), known outside Japan as Urotsukidoji: Legend of the Overfiend. These three episodes were adapted from the original manga but skip over much of the comedic sub-stories and subplots and instead shift the focus to the apocalypse and the battle between Suikakuju and Jyaku.

The three OVAs were later edited into a theatrical film. The removal of certain explicit material resulted in the film being given a Limited General Film (R) (一般映画制限付, Ippan Eiga Seigen-tsuki; currently known as "R15+") rating from Japan's Film Classification and Rating Organization. Shochiku-Fuji distributed the film to theaters while Shochiku Home Video distributed the film to VHS with the tagline Original Theatrical Version (オリジナル劇場公開版, Orijinaru Gekijō Kōkai-ban).

Legend of the Over-Fiend was shown at the Toronto Festival of Festivals on 16 September 1989. A critic credited as "Suze." wrote in Variety the film was a "sci-fi-horror schlock extravaganza verging on porno. Films like this are why the word misogynist was invented."

The theatrical film was released in North America on VHS on 11 August 1993 by Central Park Media under the "Anime 18" label - it was their first title to be released with the label and it was rated NC-17. The film was also released in the UK and Australia, with additional cuts being made by the BBFC and OFLC.

Plot

In the word of Urotsukidōji, realms of demons (makai) and man-beasts (jujinkai) run in parallel to the human realm of Earth. Aditionally, a 3000-year-old legend foretells the coming of the Overfiend (Chōjin)—a being of unimaginable power that will unite all three realms into a land of eternity.

The story follows the exploits of the protagonists—man-beast Jyaku Amano, his nymphomaniac sister Megumi and their companion Kuroko—as their 300-year search for the Overfiend takes them to a high school in Osaka, Japan. Their discoveries led them to two students: shy, lecherous Tatsuo Nagumo and school idol Akemi Ito. But Jyaku discovers that the Legend of the Overfiend is not what it seems, and that the future of the three realms may be strikingly different from what he is led to believe.

DVD releases

1. Perfect Collection (Anime 18)—2:26:06
2. Special DVD Edition (Manga Entertainment)—1:42:55
3. Movie Edition (Kitty Media)—1:45:20

The Perfect Collection from Anime 18 is the only English-friendly uncut version of the first OVA available outside Japan. Other versions such as the one on the "Hell on Earth" boxed set and the Australian Madman release with both Legend of the Overfiend and Legend of the Demon Womb have been cut for 45 minutes in total, which included a total of 24 minutes of sexually oriented scenes. The U.S. DVD releases are now out-of-print. The Movie Edition, licensed by Kitty Media in 2010 and released in 2011, is the first time any of the anime has been released on Blu-ray, though it is reformatted for widescreen (the DVD version released alongside it retains the original aspect ratio). On January 20, 2025, it was announced that Discotek Media will be rereleasing it on Blu-ray in 2025. The anime received an extensive restoration.

==== Legend of the Demon Womb (1990–1991) ====
1. "A Prayer for the Resurrection of the Lord of Chaos" (1 December 1990)
2. "Battle at Shinjuku Skyscrapers" (10 April 1991)

The second OVA series was named The True Legend of the Overgod Urotsukidōji: Connections with the Devil (真・超神伝説うろつき童子 魔胎伝, Shin Chōjin Densetsu Urotsukidōji: Mataiden), known outside Japan as Urotsukidoji II: Legend of the Demon Womb. This series was not based on the manga, but elements from it were used, with Negumo's cousin Takeaki taking on a character similar to the character of Saburo in the manga and Münchhausen II taking after the character of Suikakuju.

The second part of the saga created an ongoing controversy among Urotsukidōji fans as to where it fits into the saga as a whole. One main theory is that the two chapters happen between "Birth of the Overfiend" and "Curse of the Overfiend" of the first OVA. Another main theory is that since the characters and tone are fairly unfaithful to the first three OVAs, it ought not to be considered part of the canon in the first place.

The two OVAs were again later recut into a theatrical version; however, whereas the original two OVA episodes in this case censored sexual acts with blurring throughout, the movie edit was fully uncensored and even featured additional scenes with new animation and effects added to improve existing scenes. No material was taken out in the process—the time difference arising due to redundant credits and recaps—so the movie is to be considered the most complete version.

Plot

Unbeknownst to Jyaku and Megumi, in 1944, the Nazis attempted to summon the Overfiend's nemesis: the Lord of Chaos (Kyō-Ō). Top scientist Dr. Münchhausen and his son invented a perverse death-rape machine to summon the Lord of Chaos—but the machine overloaded; and helped to destroy half of Berlin—leaving Münchhausen II alive, but psychologically scarred.

During his adolescence, Münchhausen II discovers his father's journal and tries to uncover the secrets of the Jujinkai and the Makai. He finally succeeds and reawakens Kohoki—a demon banished to hell for eternity—into the human realm and the two form an infamous partnership.

In the present day, Münchhausen II attempts to continue his father's work to summon the Lord of Chaos. To ensure the ritual succeeds, he needs a human sacrifice. Meanwhile, Tatsuo's cousin, Takeaki Kiryu is on the next plane to Osaka...

DVD releases

1. Perfect Collection (Anime 18)—1:37:33
2. Urotsukidoji II: Legend of the Demon Womb (Anime 18)—1:26:51
3. Special DVD Edition (Manga Entertainment)—1:23:32

The Perfect Collection from Anime 18 is the only uncut version of the second Urotsukidōji OVA available outside Japan—however, even the Japanese version was censored, and this censoring was carried over. As mentioned above, this was rectified for the movie version which is uncensored and contains more original material than the OVAs. Anime 18's DVD release is uncut though others (such as Manga UK's) have again been censored with cuts made. Both Japanese and English-language tracks are included on Anime 18's DVD of the movie, but there are no subtitles. Like the Perfect Collection, it is not region-coded. Other versions such as the one on the "Hell on Earth" boxed set and the Australian Madman release with both Legend of the Overfiend and Legend of the Demon Womb have been cut for 14 minutes in total, which included a total of 7 minutes of sexually oriented scenes. The U.S. releases are also now out-of-print.

==== Return of the Overfiend (1992–1993) ====
1. "Birth of the True Overfiend" (1 October 1992)
2. "The Mystery of Caesar's Palace" (21 January 1993)
3. "The Collapse of Caesar's Palace" (21 May 1993)
4. "Journey to an Unknown World" (21 August 1993)

The third OVA series was named Legend of the Overgod Urotsukidōji: The Future (超神伝説うろつき童子 未来篇, Chōjin Densetsu Urotsukidōji: Mirai-hen), known outside Japan as Urotsukidoji III: Return of the Overfiend. This is where the saga begins to focus less on the remaining central characters and introduces other secondary characters, none of whom are present in the manga. In some cases, the four parts were edited for Western audiences into a pair of films.

Plot

Twenty years have passed and the Chojin has been prematurely born. He summons Jyaku Amano to protect him and to help to discover what has happened, sending Jyaku forth to search for the evil born in the east. Unfortunately, a new race called the Makemono (Demon-Beasts) have arisen following the apocalypse, ruled over by the fanatical cyborg Caesar and his mysterious comrade "Faust". It is apparent they are the cause behind these events and intend to resurrect the Kyō-Ō. Jyaku, along with the Makemono Buju and Caesar's traitorous daughter Alector, need to stop the two dictators from ruling the land of eternity. The question is, who will succeed?

==== Inferno Road (1993–1995) ====
1. "The Secret Garden" (21 December 1993)
2. "The Long Road to God" (21 March 1994)
3. "The End of the Journey" (20 May 1995)

The fourth OVA series was named Legend of the Overgod Urotsukidōji: The Wanderer (超神伝説うろつき童子 放浪篇, Chōjin Densetsu Urotsukidōji: Hōrō-hen), known outside Japan as Urotsukidoji IV: Inferno Road. It was banned outright in many countries (including U.K.), but was edited again for Western audiences into a single movie.

Continuing straight after the climax of Return of the Overfiend, Jyaku and the survivors head for Osaka to help the Overfiend after his climactic battle. On the way they find a kingdom where children rule over adults (OVAs 1 and 2). Jyaku's problems are furthered when an old nemesis shows up at the wrong time (OVA 3).

The third OVA in this series, "The End of the Journey", stands alone plot-wise (wrapping up the story arc from Urotsukidoji: Return of the Overfiend, on which the first two OVA have no bearing), and was originally intended to be a theatrical release.

NOTE: Inferno Road was originally intended to have another ending, which was fully completed but ultimately discarded. This ending was to have revealed that the apparent Chōjin as seen at the start of Urotsukidoji: Return of the Overfiend was not in fact the real Chōjin, but yet another Makai. This alternate ending was to have set up the abandoned The Final Chapter.

==== The Final Chapter (1996) ====
1. "The Final Act – Part 1" (28 December 1996)

The fifth OVA series was named Legend of the Overgod Urotsukidōji: The Final Act (超神伝説うろつき童子 完結篇, Chōjin Densetsu Urotsukidōji: Kanketsu-hen), also known as Urotsukidoji: The Final Chapter. Only one episode of this was partially completed, the released version containing numerous examples of animation that is missing in-between frames.

Plot

A century after the merging of the three worlds, the real Chōjin is born and creates a new hermaphroditic race to wipe out all remaining life on Earth. Akemi reawakens in a hospital, along with Jyaku, who had barely survived a recent confrontation with the Chōjin (whose form constantly mutates between male and female). Destroyer God Tatsuo also reappears (after supposedly being killed by Kyō-Ō in Urotsukidoji: Return of the Overfiend) and continues his ravaging of Earth. Still in love with Tatsuo, Akemi runs out to find him.

Meanwhile, Jyaku is confronted by some of the Chōjin's new 'children', and engages them in battle. However, his efforts prove almost futile, as they are constantly regenerated by the Chojin. Akemi eventually finds Tatsuo, still in his God form, and pleads with him. He clutches her in his hand (similarly to the end of the first episode) and prepares to kill her. However, she is rescued at the last minute by Jyaku, although she condemns him for doing so. By the end of the series, Amano Jyaku becomes dissillusioned with the Chōjin and declares war on it.

==== New Saga (2002 remake) ====
1. "The Urotsuki: Part I" (3 May 2002)
2. "The Urotsuki: Part II" (9 August 2002)
3. "The Urotsuki: Part III" (19 November 2002)

This series was named The Urotsuki (ザ・うろつき, Za Urotsuki), also known as Urotsukidōji: New Saga outside Japan, and was released in North America on 9 March 2004. This three-disc collection is a retelling of the first episode in The Legend of the Overfiend. It has the same basic plot as Birth of the Overfiend, the main differences being that Ozaki is now one of the main characters, and the story focuses more on him, while Nagumo is now a supporting character. Furthermore, Megumi is completely absent, Akemi is a clairvoyant leader of a biker gang, Nikki is gender swapped and the queen of Makai is given a more active role.

== New Urotsukidoji manga ==
After the popularity of the anime version of his work, Maeda would create a new Urotsukidoji manga in the early 90s that is a reboot of the original manga with a completely new story and characters. The protagonist of the story is Honoo Shishizawa, a young delinquent gang leader who obtains superhuman powers and discovers that the Chojin plans on remaking the world in his image, causing Honoo to make it his mission to destroy the Chojin and protect his world. Along the way, he meets Amano, Megumi and Kuroko, who are also after the Chojin.

The manga ran from 1991 to 1993.

== See also ==
- Eroguro
- Tentacle erotica
- East Asian demonic entities (魔界)
