= Demon Beast Invasion =

Japanese manga series

- Cover of the first manga volume

妖獣教室 (Yōjū Kyōshitsu)
- Genre: Horror, Erotica
- Manga
- Written by: Toshio Maeda
- Published by: Wani Magazine
- English publisher: NA: Central Park Media
- Imprint: Action Camera Comics
- Original run: May 1989 – August 1989
- Volumes: 3
- Original video animation
- Directed by: Jun Fukuta (1, 5–6); Yoshitaka Fujimoto (2); Demon Beast ONi (3–4)
- Produced by: Toshihiko Jinbou (1–2); Rusher Ikeda (1–4); Tarou Miyamae (3–4); Smallie Izumi (5–6); Kento Maki (5–6)
- Written by: Jouji Maki (1–2); Wataru Amano (3–6)
- Music by: Teruo Takahama
- Studio: Ashi Productions (1–2); MTV (3–4); Dandelion (5–6)
- Licensed by: NA: Central Park Media
- Released: May 25, 1990 – May 27, 1994
- Runtime: 40 minutes each
- Episodes: 6
- Original video animation

Demon Beast Resurrection
- Directed by: Kan Fukumoto (1–2); Junichi Watanabe (Note: Using the penname Zaamen Kuukai (座亜面空海).) (3–4)
- Produced by: Smallie Izumi; Kento Maki
- Written by: Wataru Amano
- Music by: Teruo Takahama
- Studio: Dandelion
- Licensed by: NA: Central Park Media
- Released: November 17, 1995 – September 13, 1996
- Runtime: 30 minutes each
- Episodes: 4

Demon Beast Invasion (Japanese: 妖獣教室, Hepburn: Yōjū Kyōshitsu) is a manga series written and illustrated by Toshio Maeda, published by Wani Magazine. The series was adapted into a six-part original video animation of the same name in 1990, followed by Demon Beast Resurrection (妖獣教室外伝, Yōjū Kyōshitsu Gaiden) in 1995.

== Plot ==
Millions of years ago, Earth was inhabited by a race of anthropomorphic giant monsters that can grow tentacles. Following an ecological disaster, the Earth's atmosphere had started to become inappropriate for their cellular respiration and they migrated to the planet Quasar PHL-5200. Nevertheless, they did not forget about Earth and have started to send successive vanguards. Referred to as Demon Beasts by the Interplanetary Mutual Observation Agency operatives that try to stop them, the aliens are seeking to create a race of human/alien hybrids which would adapt to the Earth's atmosphere and to rule the Earth by proxy.

The story is centred on Muneto Ungyōsai and Kayō Asakura, two college students living in Tokyo. Maitreya is presented as an eschalotogical opponent to the end-days to be brought by the alien invasion.

== Main characters (anime) ==
Episode 1

- Muneto Ungyōsai: A timid college student and the son of a Buddhist temple master, Muneto is a junior operative of the Interplanetary Mutual Observation Agency.
- Kayō Asakura: The high school love interest of Muneto, Kayō had started a relationship with Tsutomu Kawai, Muneto's high school friend. Her body is exceptionally suitable to create human/alien hybrids.
- Shin'ichi Kasu: A former school teacher of modest means, Kasu is the veteran operative of the Interplanetary Mutual Observation Agency.
- The Vanguard: A demon beast who after several "unsuitable" women, he has sex with Kayō in Tsutomu's guise and impregnates her.

Episode 2

- Jun'ichi Yagami: The ambitious Interplanetary Mutual Observation Agency operative assigned to Muneto as a partner after Kasu's death.
- The Hybrid: Son of Kayō with the Vanguard, he grows to an adult alien in half a day and starts to implement the invasion plans.
- Miki: A friend of Kayō, she mutates into an alien minion after she is seduced by the Hybrid.

Episode 3

- Ash: The leader of the all-female extraterrestrial task force assigned by the Interplanetary Mutual Observation Agency after Muneto and Yagami fail to kill the Hybrid.
- Ms. Satomi: A teacher of Kayō, she is kidnapped and used by the Hybrid to lure her.

Episode 4

- Miyuki: Kayō's cousin who is under training at Ōyama to become a miko but she is possessed by the Hybrid.
- Mr. Ungyōsai: Muneto's father and a temple master, he thinks that the alien presence is the result of the family karma.
- Munechika Ungyōsai: Muneto's yamabushi uncle who helps him to fight the Hybrid.

Episode 5

- Mei Ling: A Chinese girl who escapes Pearl River Triad henchmen and takes refuge in Hong Kong.
- G7: An Interplanetary Mutual Observation Agency operative with the mission to abort Triad plans of joining forces with the Hybrid.

Episode 6

- Iyō: A local girl who mutated into the minion of the Hybrid and helps him to find Kayō.
- Irimote: Interplanetary Mutual Observation Agency Demon Beast Buster sent to save Kayō and Muneto from the Hybrid.
- Professor: The teacher who leads the school trip to a remote Ryukyuan island.

=== Demon Beast Resurrection ===
Purgatory (Episodes 1 & 2)

- Miki: A sukeban chosen to give her body for the resurrection of Ash who was killed by the Hybrid.
- Dee & BB: The lieutenants of Ash in the Interplanetary Mutual Observation Agency task force.
- Captain O: The commander of the Interplanetary Mutual Observation Agency spaceship's all-female crew.

Soul Survivor (Episodes 3 & 4)

- "The Mailman": A member of Miyuki's Demon Beast cult that seeks to resurrect the Hybrid, he is assigned to kidnap Kayō.
- The Slave: A loyal female minion of Miyuki.

== Allegations of promoting obscenity ==
In 1999, Jesus Castillo, a clerk at Keith's Comics in Dallas, was accused of promoting obscenity for selling an issue of the Demon Beast Invasion manga to an undercover officer. He was fined $4000 and sentenced to one year of unsupervised probation after the original six-month prison term sentence was suspended.

== Notes ==
=== Citations ===
- Takano, Hideo, ed. (1997). 野々村病院の人々&河原崎家の一族 THE ANIMATION [Nonomura Byouin no Hitobito & Kawarazaki-ke no Ichizoku The Animation]. KSS. ISBN 978-4877091613.
