= The Kiss of the Octopus =

Novel by Patrick Grainville

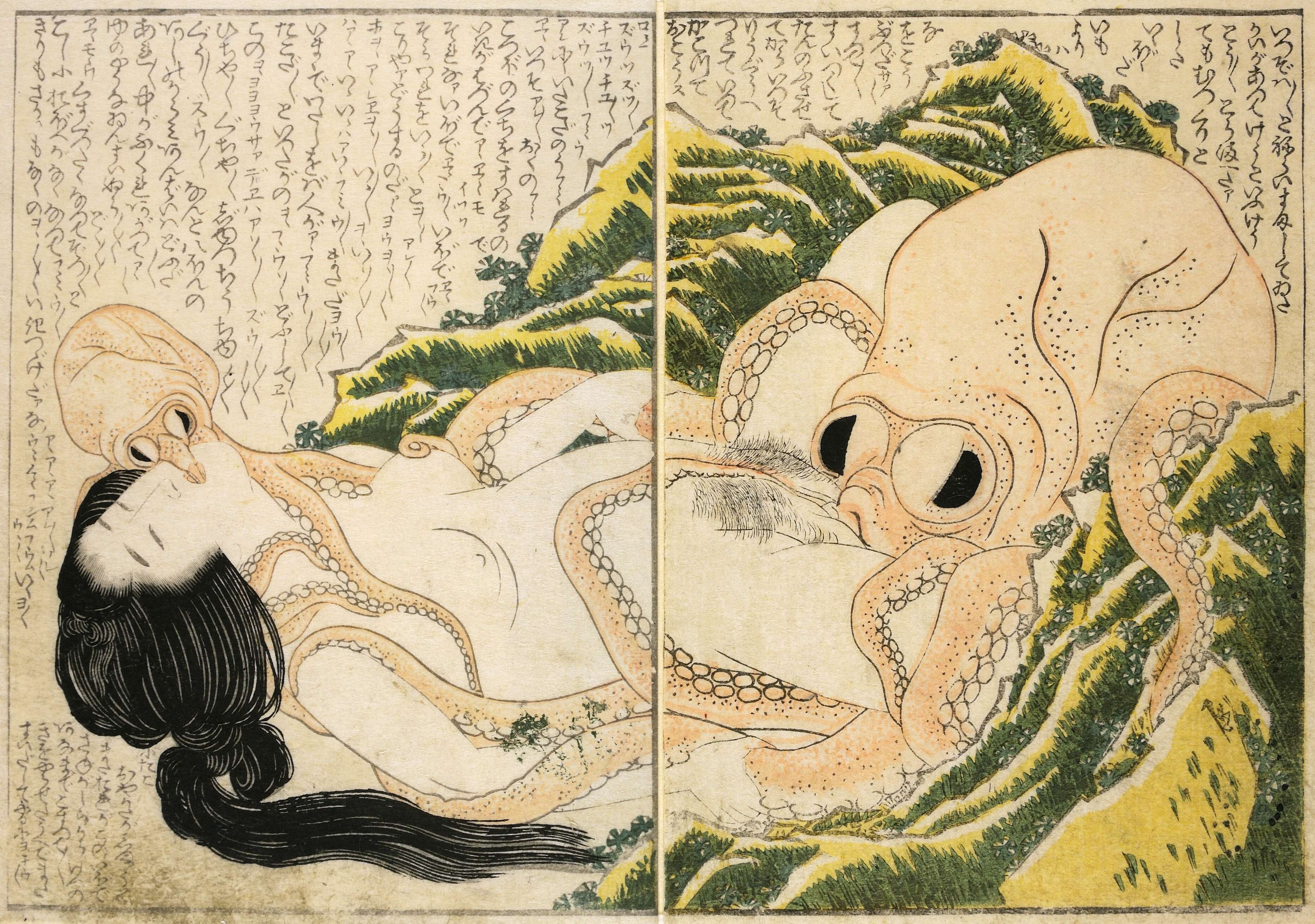
"The Dream of the Fisherman's Wife" by Hokusai, origin of the novel.

The Kiss of the Octopus is the twenty-second novel of Patrick Grainville published in éditions du Seuil in 2010.

== Historical background ==
The painters are in the center of Patrick Grainville's work — Jacques Callot in "The Edge" (1973), Jan van Eyck in "The Workshop of the painter" (1988), George Catlin in "Bison" (2014), etc. The Japanese painter Hokusai is the author of an erotic and fantastique Ukiyo-e engraving: The Dream of the Fisherman's Wife. There is shown the ecstasy of a naked woman clutched by two octopuses there. Patrick Grainville undertakes to tell the story of these supernatural lovers. With The Kiss of the Octopus he extends once again the imagination of a famous picture and offers his literary equivalence. The present theme of animality in all his books is carried across the engraving to the paroxysm of art and of transgression and found between others. The hallucinosis advantageous of erotic situations also returns in Japanese tradition idealised by Yasunari Kawabata in "The House of the Sleeping Beauties".

== Reception ==
The Kiss of the octopus was received well, following the example of The Paradise of storms in 1986 and reissued concomitamment with Flamboyants and The Orgy, the Snow in 2010. It was considered to be a «classic of erotism» since then. Criticism greets style of the author, which is colourful and virtuoso, although sometimes too thick, close to one of Clézio work. In the service of a work which is not, Patrick Grainville doesn't afraid to dare and breaks on the contrary with "the puritanical humanism".

== Editions ==
- The Kiss of the Octopus, éditions du Seuil, 2010
