= Bizone (disambiguation) =

Bizone is the combination of the American and the British occupation zones during the occupation of Germany after World War II.

Bizone may also refer to:

- Bizone, synonym for Cyana, a genus of moths
- Bizone, or Byzone, an ancient Greek colony in modern-day Kavarna, Bulgaria
- Bizone Rock, a rock in the South Shetland Islands, Antarctica

== See also ==
- Bizon (disambiguation)
- Bison (disambiguation)
- Bisone, a frazione of the Italian commune of Cisano Bergamasco
