= The Fisherman's Wife =

The Fisherman's Wife may refer to:

- The Dream of the Fisherman's Wife, a work of Japanese erotica
- The Fisherman and His Wife, a German fairy tale
