= Bizon =

Bizon may refer to:

- Bizon SMG, Russian submachine gun
- John Bizon (born 1951), American politician
- ST Bizon, Polish tugboat
- Bizon (company), Polish combine harvester manufacturer

== See also ==
- Bison (disambiguation)
- Bizone (disambiguation)
