= Bizon (company) =

Polish harvester company

- Native name: Bizon Sp. z o.o.
- Type: Limited liability company
- Industry: Agricultural machinery
- Founded: 1 August 2012
- Defunct: 1999
- Fate: Acquired by New Holland (1998; remaining shares acquired 1999)
- Headquarters: Płock, Poland
- Products: Combine harvesters
- Parent: New Holland

Bizon was a Polish combine harvester producer based in Płock, Poland. It designed machines for harvesting cereals, rapeseed, maize, sunflower and other crops.

== History ==
Bizon was privatized in 1992 after the reorganization of Agromet, a state-owned agricultural business. In 1995 Bizon reached account profitability and in 1997 had a net sales of about $40 million and a $4 million net profit.

Bizon harvesters used domestic engines such as SW400 and SW680 manufactured by Polish engine factory Andoria. Standard Bizon tyres were STOMIL.

Bizon held approximately 80% of the Polish combine harvester market and had begun sales expansion in Latin America, Pakistan, Belarus and Ukraine.

On 29 July 1998, 90.87% of Bizon Sp.zo.o. was acquired by New Holland for $33 million. The remaining shares of the Polish company were purchased in March 1999. The U.S. Securities and Exchange Commission estimated that New Holland had paid $18 million more than the company's actual value.

== Z055 ==
Bizon America harvesters were produced only twenty-something. All of them went to Scandinavia. The harvester was produced in 1975, it already had a hydraulically foldable discharge pipe, loss sensors, wide tires, a cabin with sliding doors and, above all, a characteristic large grain tank, holding 3 tons of wheat, which is almost twice as much as in the Bizon Super. The capacity of the tank was used in it, partly due to the fact that the mounted short oblique auger poured the grain only into the center of the tank.

== Z056 ==
The Z-056 combine, developed as the successor of the Z-050 combine in the "Super" type, is intended for harvesting four basic cereals, rape and some legumes from the trunk. The use of a swath pick-up enables harvesting with the two-stage method.

== Gallery ==
Bizon combine harvesters
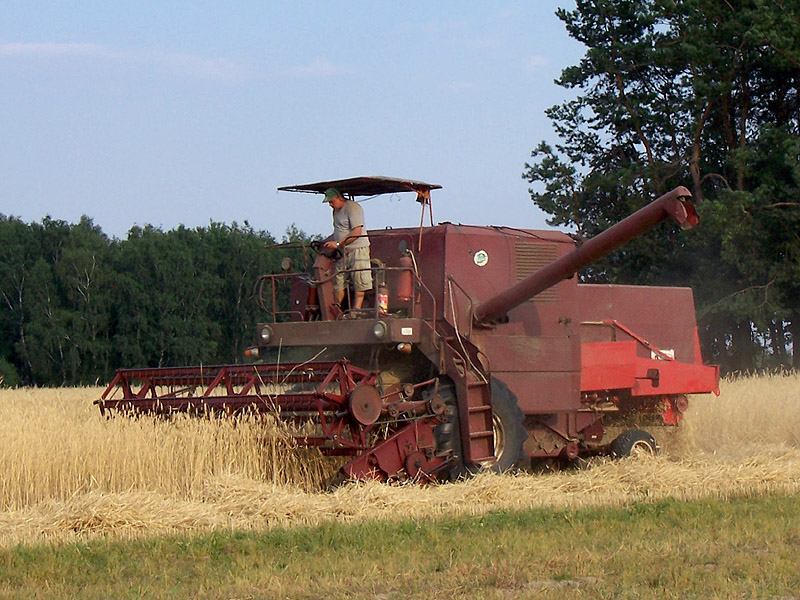
Bizon Super Z056 combine harvester

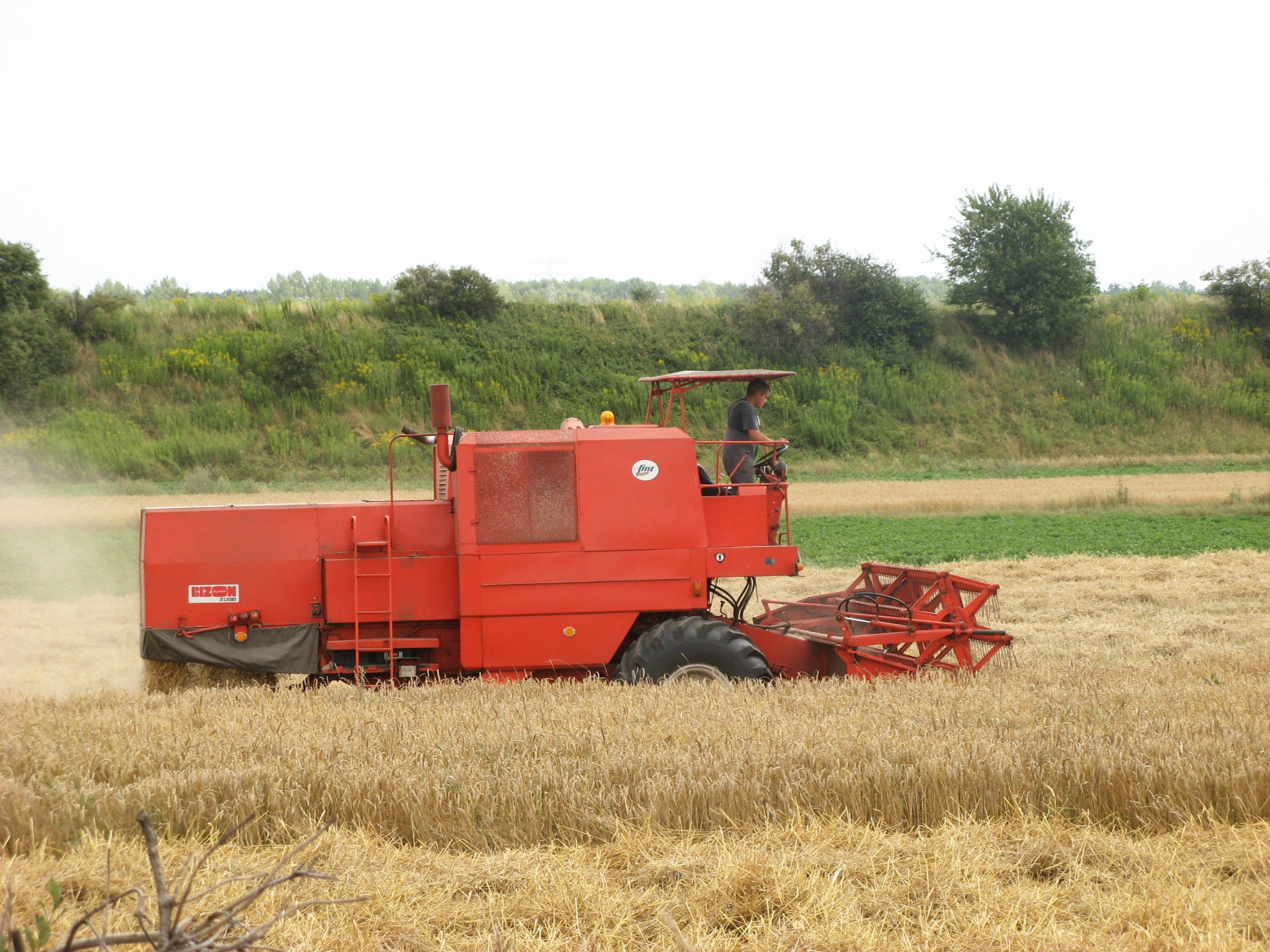
A Polish Bizon combine harvesting wheat

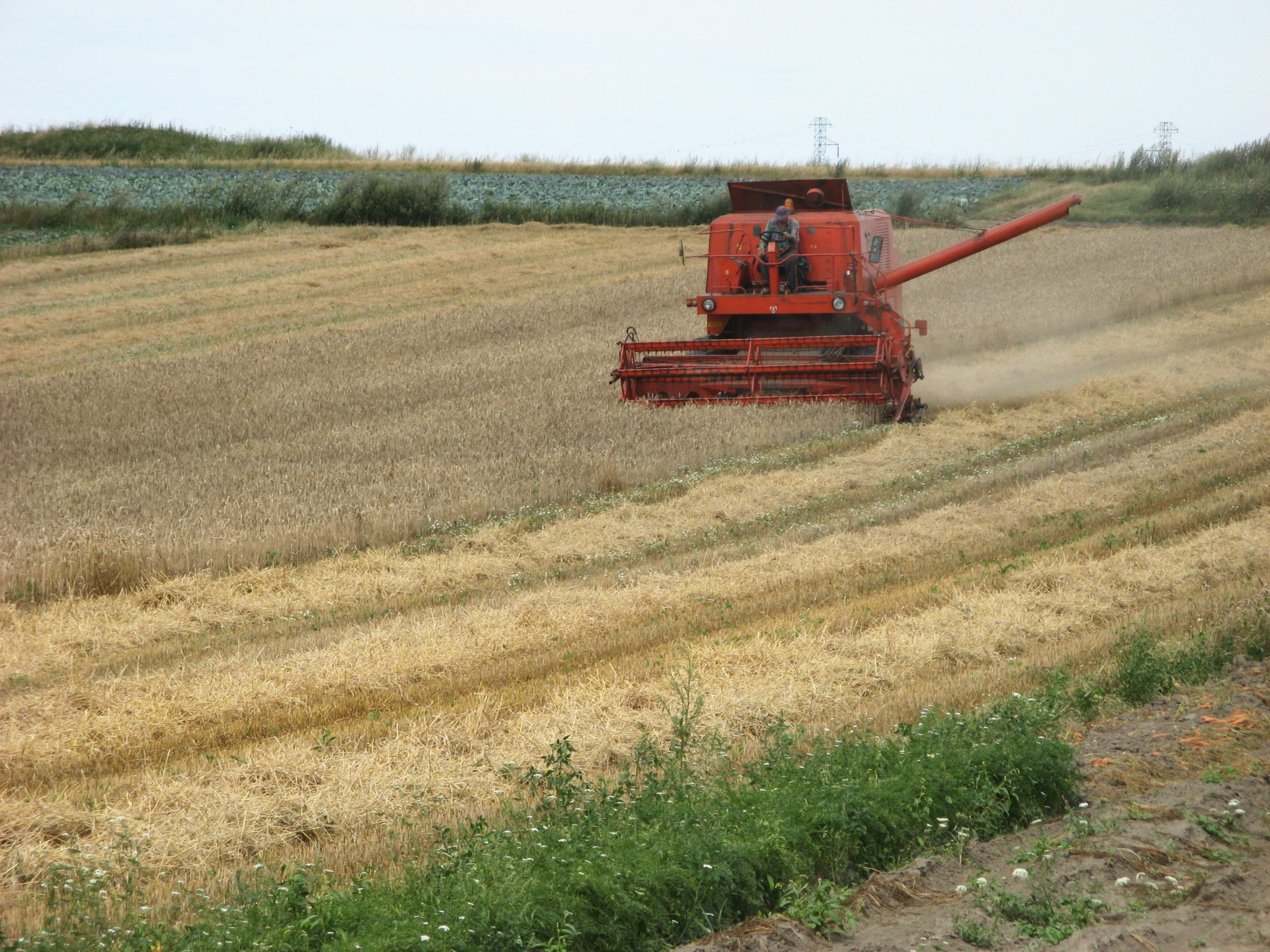
A Bizon combine harvesting wheat in Poland

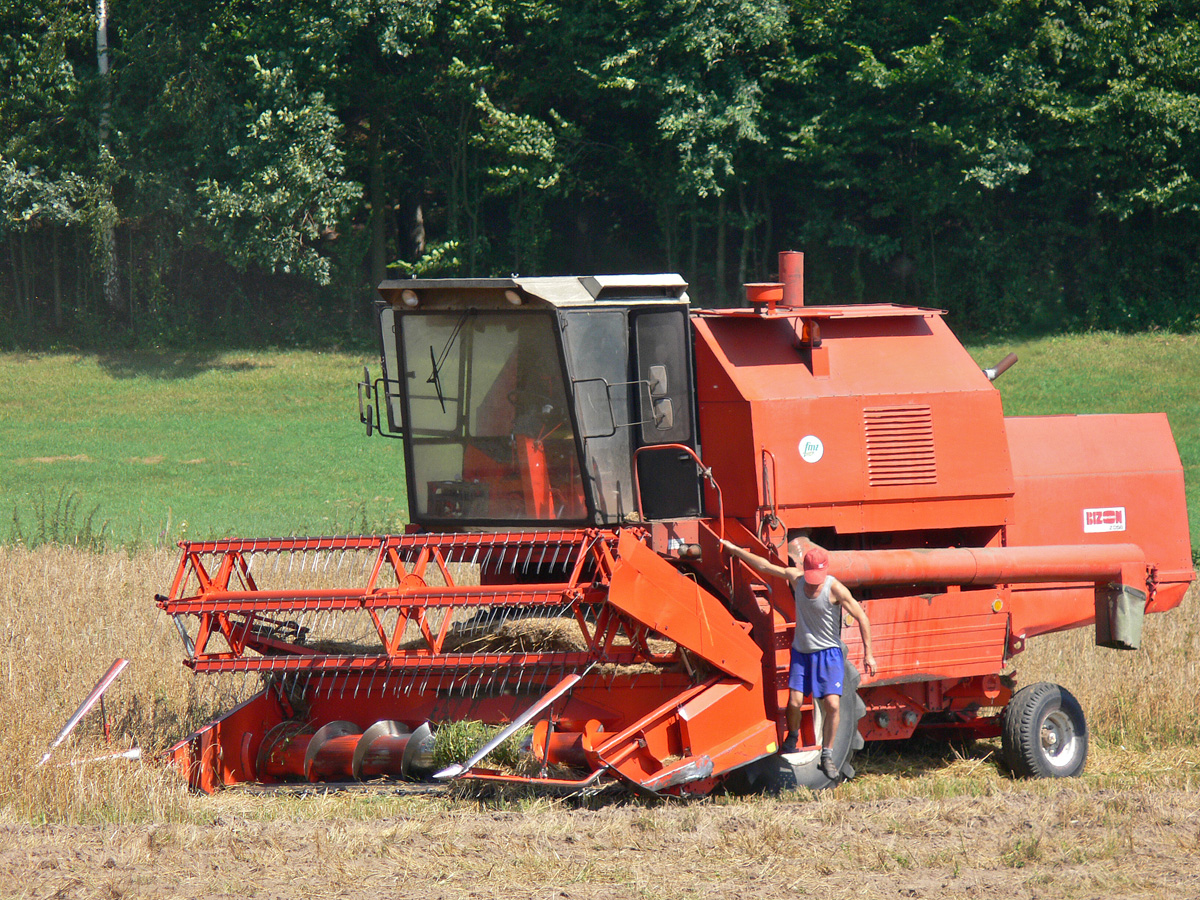
Bizon Z058 combine harvester
