= Patrick Grainville =

French novelist (born 1947)

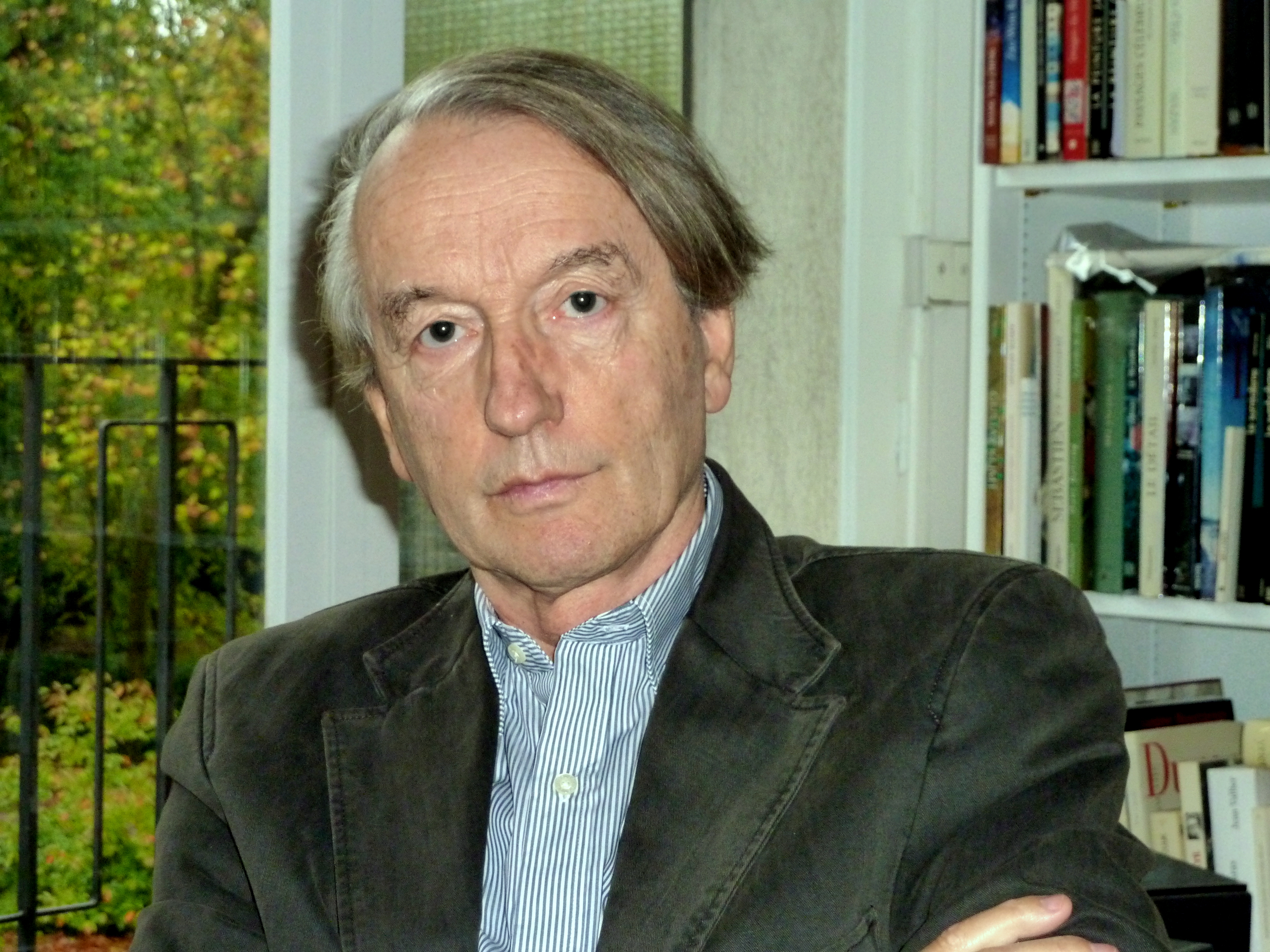
- Grainville in 2011
- Born: 1 June 1947 (age 79); Villers-sur-Mer, France
- Education: Lycée Henri-IV; Paris-Sorbonne University
- Occupation: Novelist
- Known for: Member of the Académie Française

Patrick Grainville (French pronunciation: [patʁik ɡʁɛ̃vil]; born 1 June 1947 Villers-sur-Mer, Calvados) is a French novelist.

He spent his childhood in Villerville, a small town east of Deauville. An associate professor of letters, he received the Prix Goncourt in 1976, 29 years old, for his fourth novel, Les Flamboyants ("The Flasher").

He has written extensively on Africa, where he undertook a cooperative mission. He is professor of French at the Lycée Évariste Galois in Sartrouville.

Grainville is also literary critic for Le Figaro. In 2018, he was elected to the Académie Française.

== Biography ==
Grainville spent his childhood in Normandy, regularly going to hunt and poach with his father, businessman and mayor of Villerville. He attended the André Maurois lycee in Deauville, then Malherbe in Caen, before winning admission to his higher education at the Lycée Henri-IV and to the Sorbonne where he prepared for his civil service competitive examination. At the age of 19 years Grainville wrote his first manuscript, then at age 25 he published his first novel The Fleece, which was immediately accepted by Gallimard. Just before dying, Henry de Montherlant predicted him great future and lauded his specific style. His next novel The Edge failed the Goncourt in 1973, in the fifth tour against The ogre by Jacques Chessex, to the great displeasure of Michel Tournier who supported it in jury.

== Themes ==
=== Fantasy ===
Having compared with Jean Giono for his wild novels linked to elements and to Louis-Ferdinand Céline for his "verbal excess", Grainville distanced himself from this inheritance by a fantastique and dream which impregnates his work: the mythological Amazon (La Diane rousse), return to original animality (The Shadow of the animal), secrets and conspiracies (The black Fortresses), the narrator observer of underworld (The eternal Tyrant), or the animals who manage the destiny of men (Light of the rat, The Kiss of the octopus). Writer of the two centuries, following the example of Huysmans but having digested Proust, Nouveau roman and "the academic ressassements of some realism", according to Michel Tournier Grainville opened a "new way" which led to the 21st century.

=== Painting ===
Grainville always enjoyed painting, which was his inspiration.

== Works ==
=== Novels ===
- La Toison, Gallimard, 1972
- La Lisière, Gallimard, 1973
- L'Abîme, Gallimard, 1974
- Les Flamboyants, Éditions du Seuil, 1976, ISBN 978-2-02-004459-2 – prix Goncourt
- La Diane rousse (Red Diana), Éditions du Seuil, 1978 (variations on the myth of Orion).
- Le Dernier viking, Éditions du Seuil, 1982, ISBN 978-2-02-006058-5
- L'Ombre de la bête, Balland, 1981
- Les Forteresses noires, Seuil, 1982, ISBN 978-2-02-006042-4
- La Caverne céleste, Éditions du Seuil, 1984, ISBN 978-2-02-006706-5
  - The Cave of Heaven, Dalkey Archive Press, 1991, ISBN 978-0-916583-68-2
- Le Paradis des Orages, le Grand livre du mois, 1986, ISBN 9782020090285
- L'Atelier du peintre, Éditions du Seuil, 1988
- L'Orgie, la Neige, le Grand livre du mois, 1990 – prix Guillaume le Conquérant, by the Société des auteurs de Normandie.
- Colère, Éditions du Seuil, 1992, ISBN 978-2-02-013529-0
- Les anges et les faucons: roman, Éditions du Seuil, 1994, ISBN 978-2-02-020604-4
- Le Lien, Éditions du Seuil, 1996
- Le Tyran éternel, Seuil, 1998
- Le Jour de la fin du monde une femme me cache, 2001
- L'Atlantique et les Amants, 2002
- La Joie d'Aurélie, Seuil, 2004, ISBN 978-2-02-062775-7
- La Main blessée, 2005
- Lumière du rat, 2008
- Le Baiser de la pieuvre (The Kiss of the Octopus), 2010
- Le Corps immense du président Mao, 2011
- Bison – Grand prix Palatine for historic novel, 2014
- Le Démon de la vie. Seuil. 2016. ISBN 9782021291285.
- Falaise des fous. Seuil. 2018. ISBN 9782021375374.
- Les Yeux de Milos. Seuil. 2021. ISBN 9782021468663.

=== Stories ===
- 1978 : Images du désir, short stories, éditions Playboy – Filipacchi.
- 2015 : Marguerite Duras, collection Duetto, Nouvelles Lectures.

=== Books for youth ===
- 1986 : Le plus beau des pièges, roman illustrated by Arno in Je bouquine.
- 1993 : L'Arbre-piège (unillustrated reedition of Plus beau des pièges, couverture d'Enki Bilal), collection Petit Point, éditions du Seuil.
- 1995 : Le Secret de la pierre noire, illustré par Dupuy-Berberian, Nathan (maison d'édition).
- 2000 : Les Singes voleurs dans Les Singes voleurs – 6 histoires d'archéologie (collectif), éditions Fleurus (maison d'édition).
- 2000 : Le Rire du géant dans Un os dans le rosbif – 6 histoires de pirates (collectif), éditions Fleurus (maison d'édition).

=== Prefaces ===
- 1980 : L'Homme tout nu by Catulle Mendès, éditions Hallier.
- 1989 : L'Iris by Josh Westrich et Ben R. Hager, Thames & Hudson.
- 1992 : La Normandie (collectif), éditions Larousse.
- 1993 : La Semaine secrète de Vénus by Pierre Mac Orlan, Arléa.
- 1995 : Liberté pour les ours! by John Irving, Éditions Points collection, éditions du Seuil.
- 1995 : La Cuisinière normande by Paul Touquet, under direction of Claude Tchou, éditions du Seuil.
- 2004 : Bethsabée by Torgny Lindgren, Babel collection, Actes Sud.
- 2012 : Pourquoi aimez-vous "Les Travailleurs de la mer"?, interview in Les travailleurs de la mer with Victor Hugo, édition mise à jour en 2012, Garnier Frères collection

=== Radio dramas ===
- 1975 : L'Assaut, réalisation d'Henri Soubeyran pour France Culture.
- 2002 : Toi, Osiris, réalisation d'Anne Lemaître pour France Culture, avec Isabelle Carré.

=== Cinema ===
- 1980: Le Voyage en douce by Michel Deville, literary collaboration.

== Bibliography ==
- Jeanne Polton, L'écriture de la sensualité dans le roman contemporain (Duras, Grainville, Simon, Sollers), Lille, Presses universitaires du Septentrion, 1999.
- Rachel Edwards, Myth and the Fiction of Michel Tournier and Patrick Grainville, Lewiston, New York, Edwin Mellen Press Ltd, 2000.
- Alain-Philippe Durand, Un monde techno : Nouveaux espaces électroniques dans le roman français des années 1980-1990, Berlin, Weidler Buchverlag, 2004.
- Marie-Odile Lainé, Villerville, une enfance en féerie dans Balade en Calvados, sur les pas des écrivains, Paris, Éditions Alexandrines, 2004 et, sous le titre Le Calvados des Ecrivains, 2014.
- Charlotte Baker, Enduring Negativity : Representations of Albinism in the Novels of Didier Destremau, Patrick Grainville and Williams Sassine, Oxford, Bern, Berlin, Bruxelles, Frankfurt am Main, New York, Wien, Peter Lang, 2011.
- Dauda Yillah, 'Patrick Grainville's Black African World: Dismantling or Bolstering Cultural Binarisms?’, Nottingham French Studies, 58,1 (2019), pp. 82–101.

Quotations (anthologies and trials)

- Brève histoire des fesses, par Jean-Luc Hennig, Zulma, 1995.
- Le livre du plaisir, présenté par Catherine Breillat, Editions 1, 1999.
- Le cheval est une femme comme une autre, par Jean-Louis Gouraud, éditions Pauvert, 2001.
- L'art est difficile, par Jean-Baptiste Harang, Éditions Julliard, 2004.
- Le Chemin des livres, par Philippe Le Guillou, Mercure de France, 2013.
