= Kinoe no Komatsu =

Japanese woodblock erotica

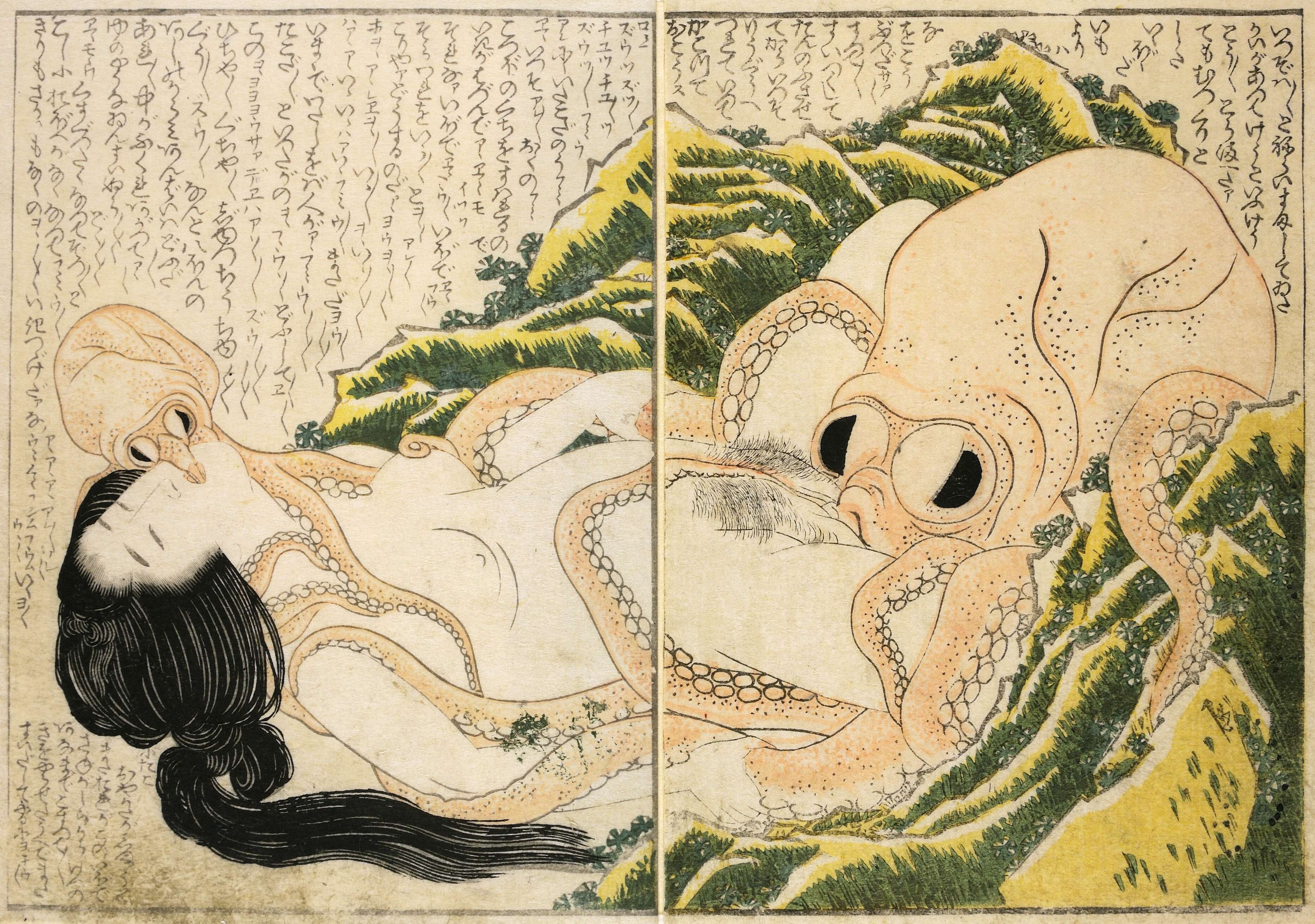
The Dream of the Fisherman's Wife, best-known print of the series

Kinoe no Komatsu (喜能会之故真通) ('Young Pines' or 'Pine Seedlings on the First Rat Day'), published in three volumes in 1814, is a woodblock-printed book of shunga erotica by Hokusai made within the ukiyo-e genre.

== Description ==
The series consists of three books, each of 30 pages, first published in 1814. Each books starts with an okubi-e print of a courtesan; next there are 7 spreads of erotic scenes, and ends with close-up pictures of genitalia.

== Narratives ==
Kinoe no komatsu has two types of narrative. One continuous narrative is about the sexual life of Hanada Umenosuke, and it links all three volumes together. In Volume I he gets involved in a sexual relationship with his aunt's son-in-law's daughter Tamami Oiso. In Volume II, the couple get involved with Tamami Oiso's maid, and in Volume III, Hanada Umenosuke becomes a practising acupuncturist and treats both a man and a woman. A second type of narrative that fills the empty space alongside the images tells about the activities depicted.

== The Dream of the Fisherman's Wife ==
Illustrations in the albums are views of partially naked couples. One scene in Volume III, the most famous of Hokusai's erotic paintings, called The Dream of the Fisherman's Wife, is unique in its focus: it depicts a woman, evidently an ama (a shell diver), enveloped in the limbs of two octopuses. The larger of the two mollusks performs cunnilingus on her, while the smaller one, his offspring, assists by fondling the woman's mouth and left nipple. The surrounding text express their mutual sexual pleasure from the encounter.

Scholar Danielle Talerico notes that the image would have recalled to the minds of contemporary viewers the story of Princess Tamatori, highly popular in the Edo period. In this story, Tamatori is a modest shell diver who marries Fujiwara no Fuhito of the Fujiwara clan, who is searching for a pearl stolen from his family by Ryūjin, the dragon god of the sea. Vowing to help, Tamatori dives down to Ryūjin's undersea palace of Ryūgū-jō, and is pursued by the god and his army of sea creatures, including octopuses. She cuts open her own breast and places the jewel inside; this allows her to swim faster and escape, but she dies from her wound soon after reaching the surface.

== Analysis ==
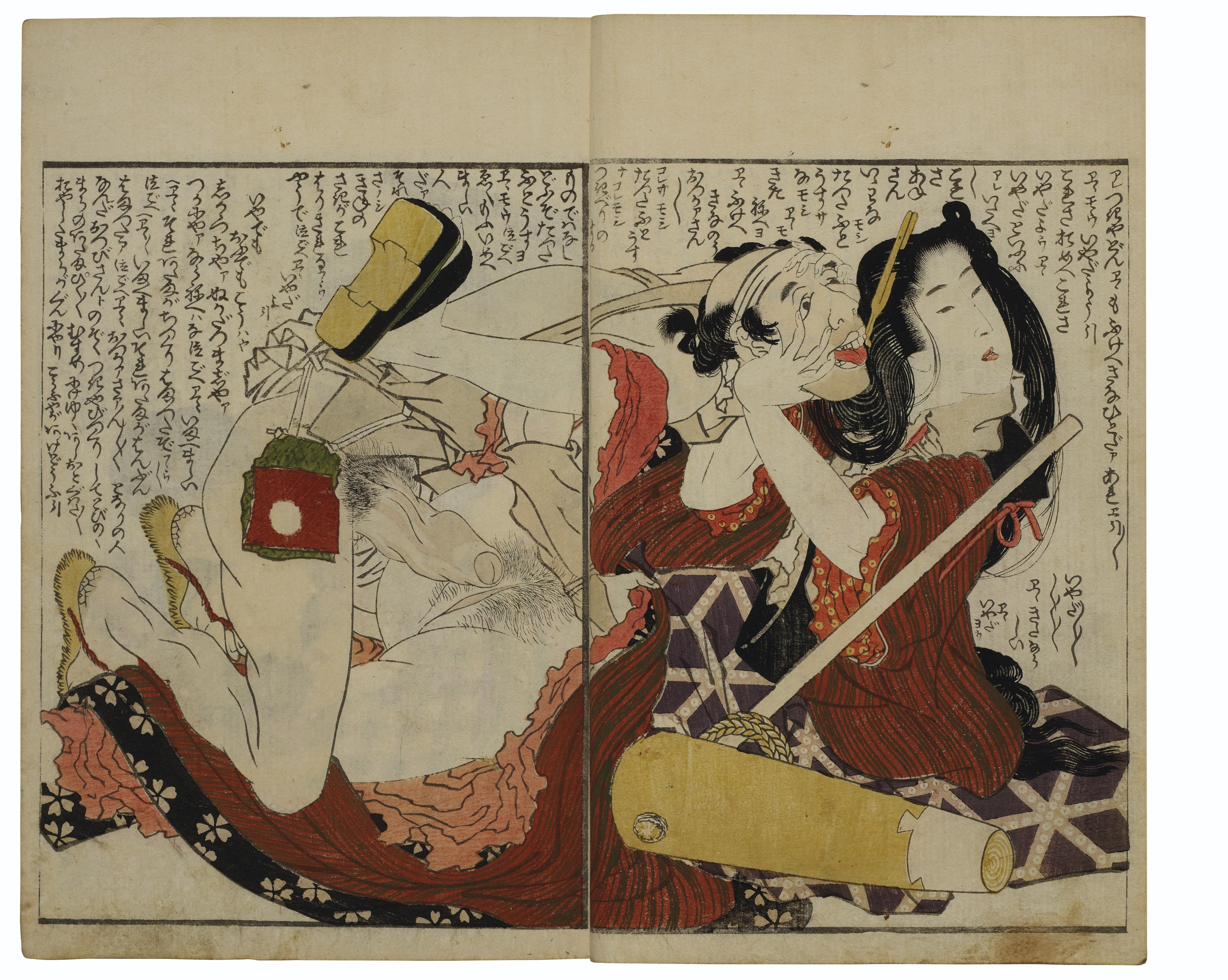
Page depicts a rice maker who intends to rape a young girl

Scholar Mihashi Osamu examined shunga art and particularly Hokusai's prints from Kinoe no Komatsu. He identified four typical features of depicted men that show their "evil appearance":

a hairy body, a large nose and broad face (or head, and sometimes thick lips), dark skin, and a closed foreskin (phimosis). In Katsushika Hokusai's Kinoe no komatsu (1814), a mochi maker who speaks like a complete provincial is attacking a young woman. The man's nose is unappealingly large, and his penis shows signs of phimosis, meeting two of the qualifications for an evil appearance. The young woman is calling him "filthy" (kitanarashii) and openly expressing her physical disgust. Her genitals are firmly closed, and she shows no sign of welcoming him. In fact, reading the inscribed dialogue one learns that a neighbor heard her screams and hurried to the scene, surprising the attacker and allowing the young woman to escape. The man's evil appearance foretells his failure to have sex with the woman, and that is the outcome, due to her rejection and defiance; for this reason the scene may be considered to fall within the realm humor. However, if so, this would be laughter ruled by a masculine point of view. And in fact not all evil rape scenes end in failure and the ridicule of a worthless man.

== Gallery ==
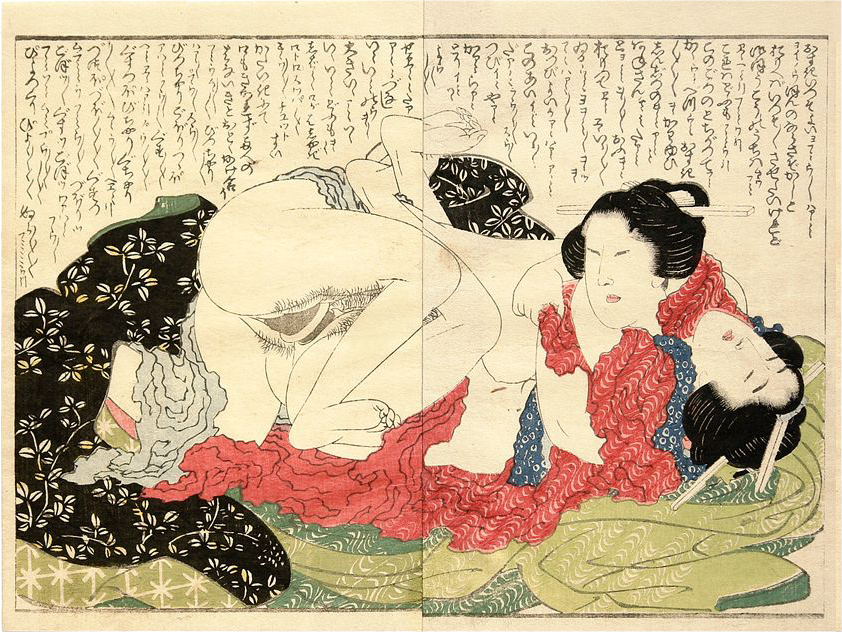
Page depicting a lesbian couple

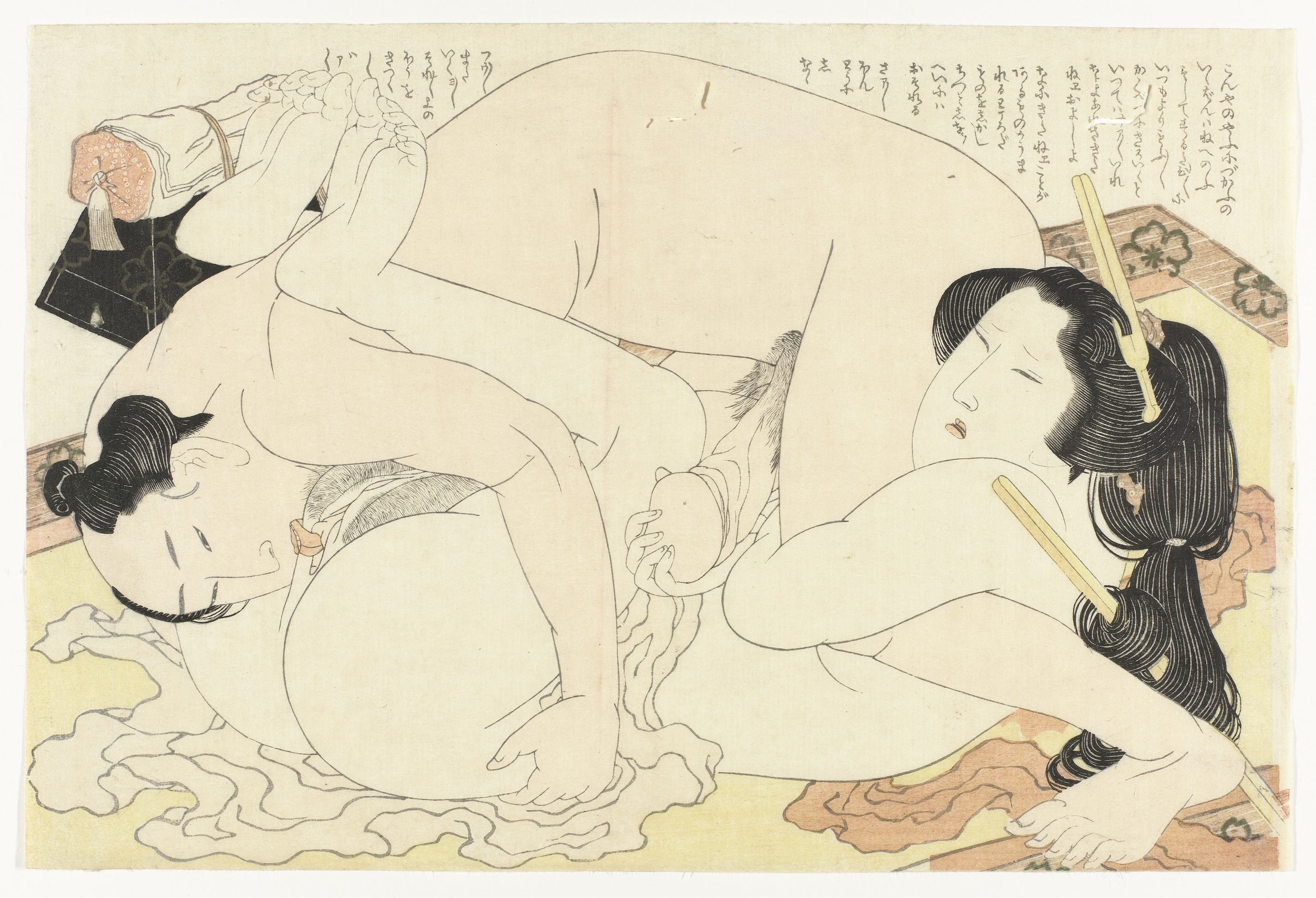
Page depicting a couple in the 69 position

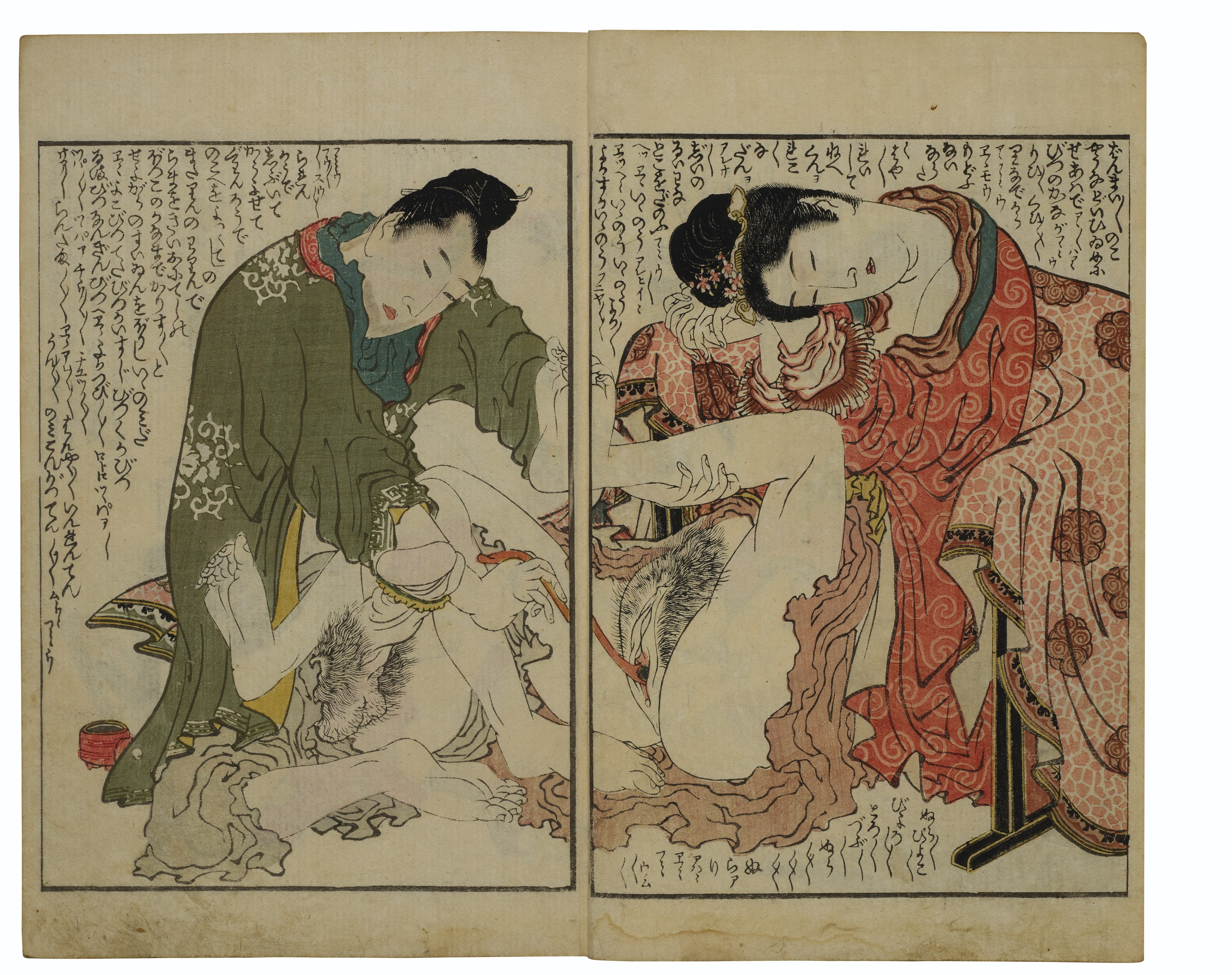
Page with a couple having sex, wrapped in green and red kimonos in a domestic interior.

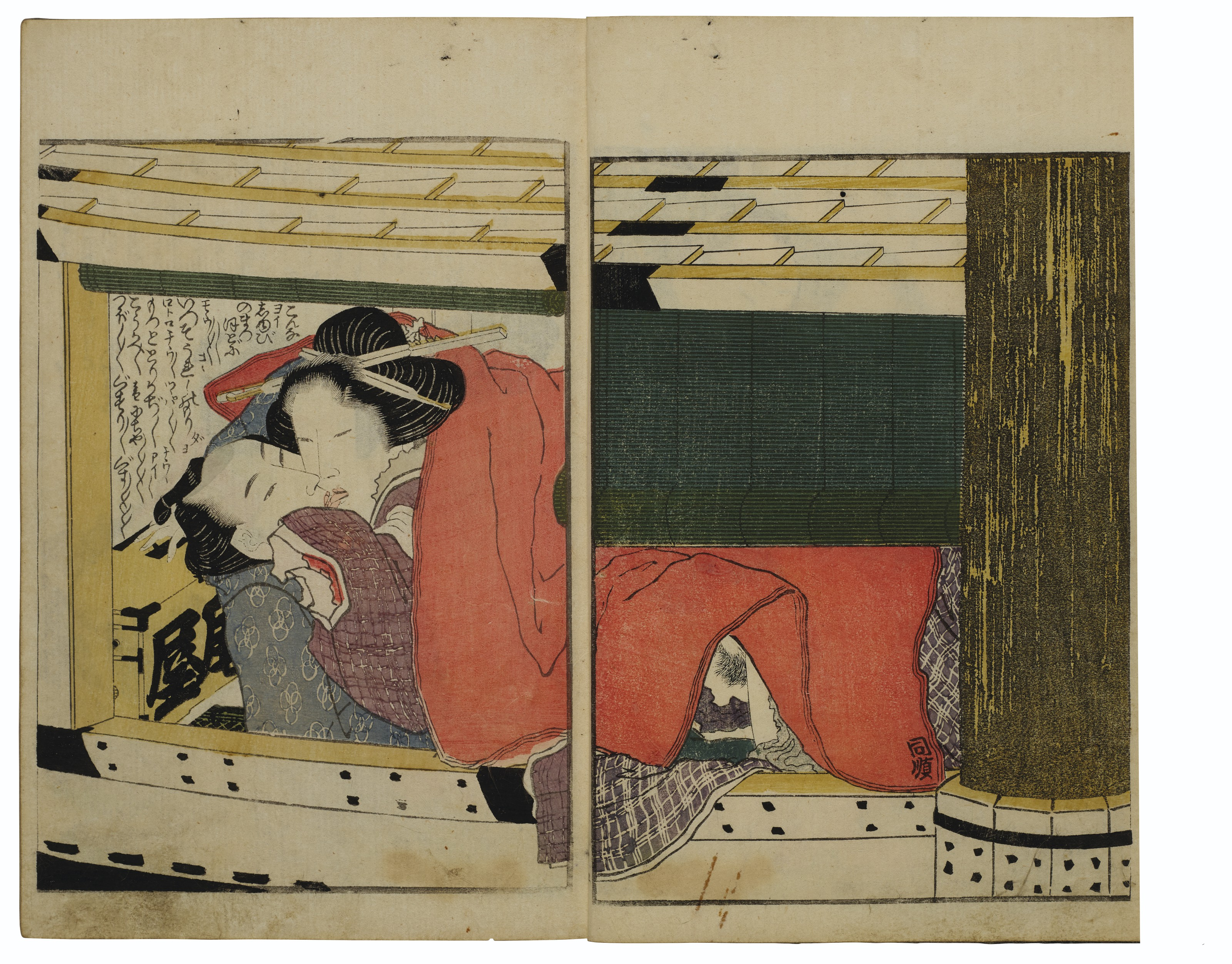
Page showing a couple embracing and partly covered by a red kimono, beside the blinds of a veranda.

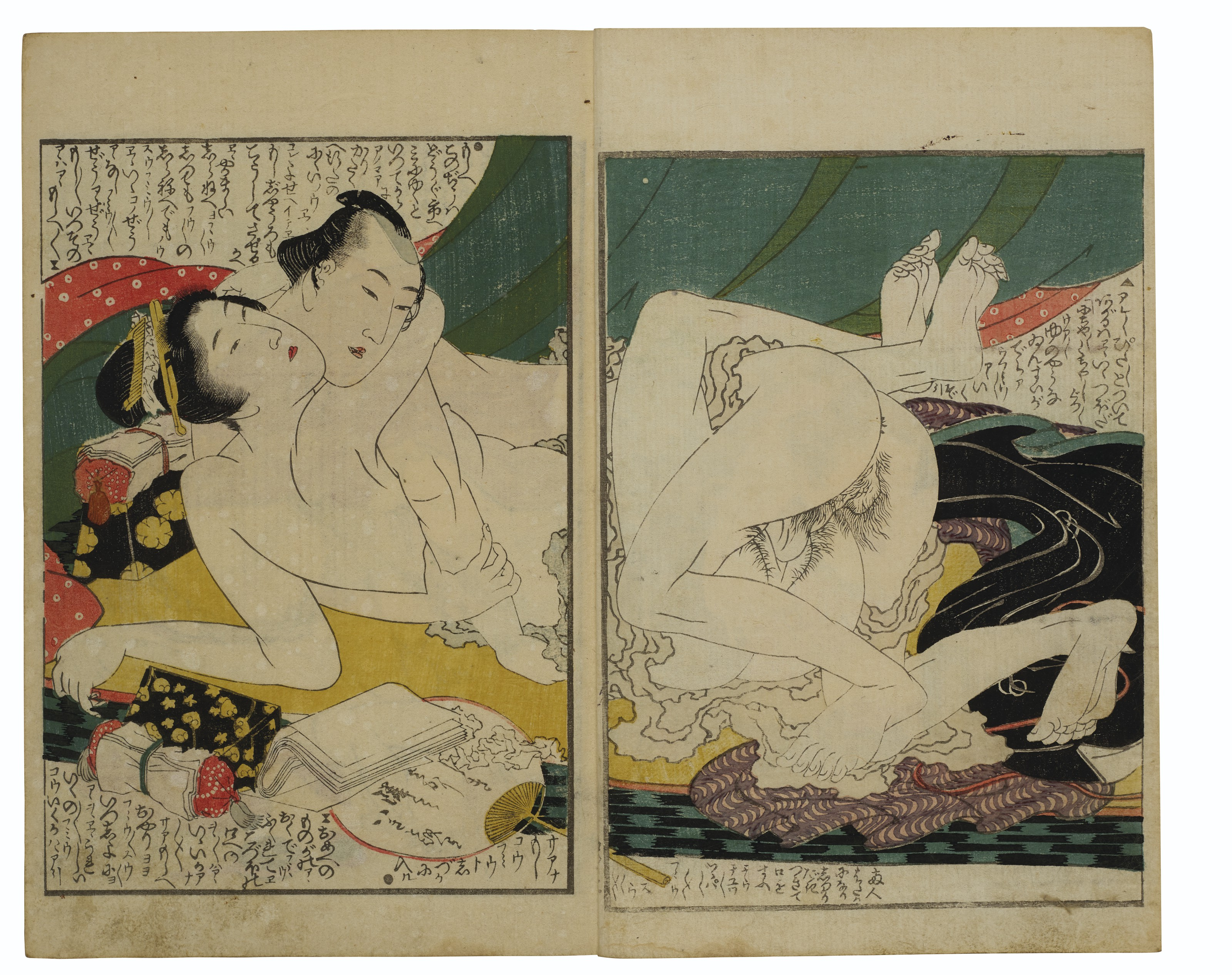
Page with a couple lying on a futon, having sex, with an open book in front of them.

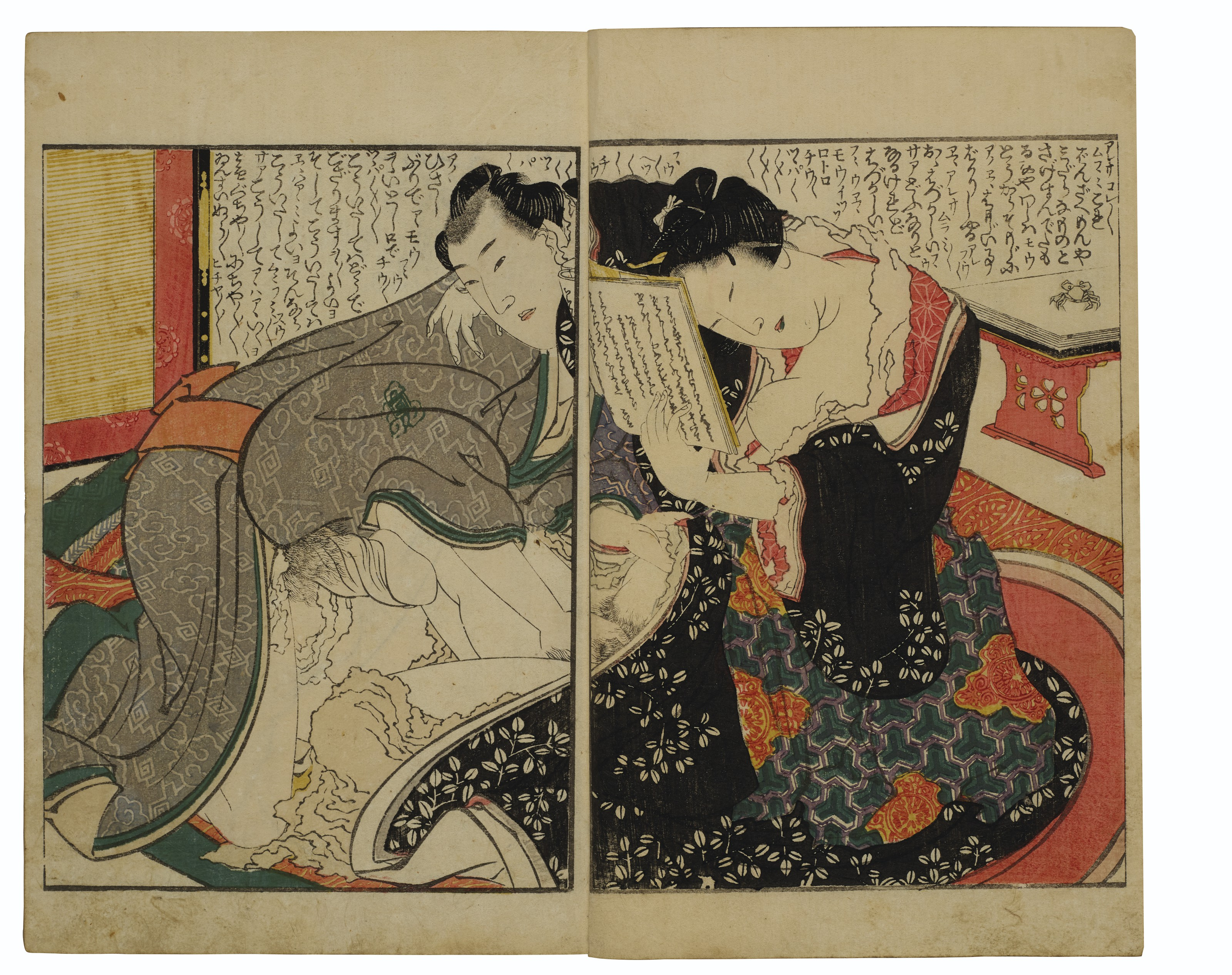
Page in which a man caresses a woman intimately while she reads a note or letter.

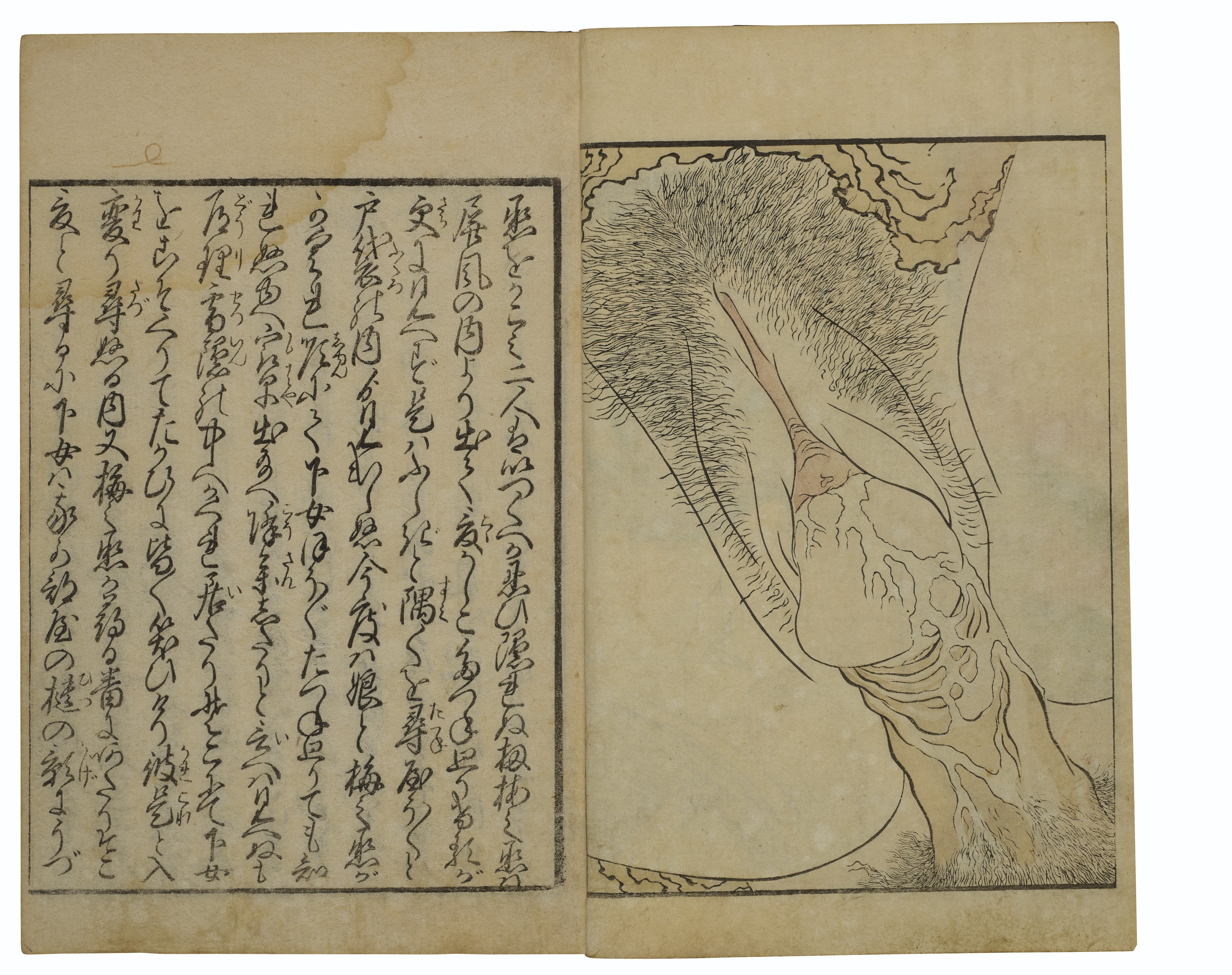
Page combining explanatory text and an anatomical illustration of the genitals during penetration.

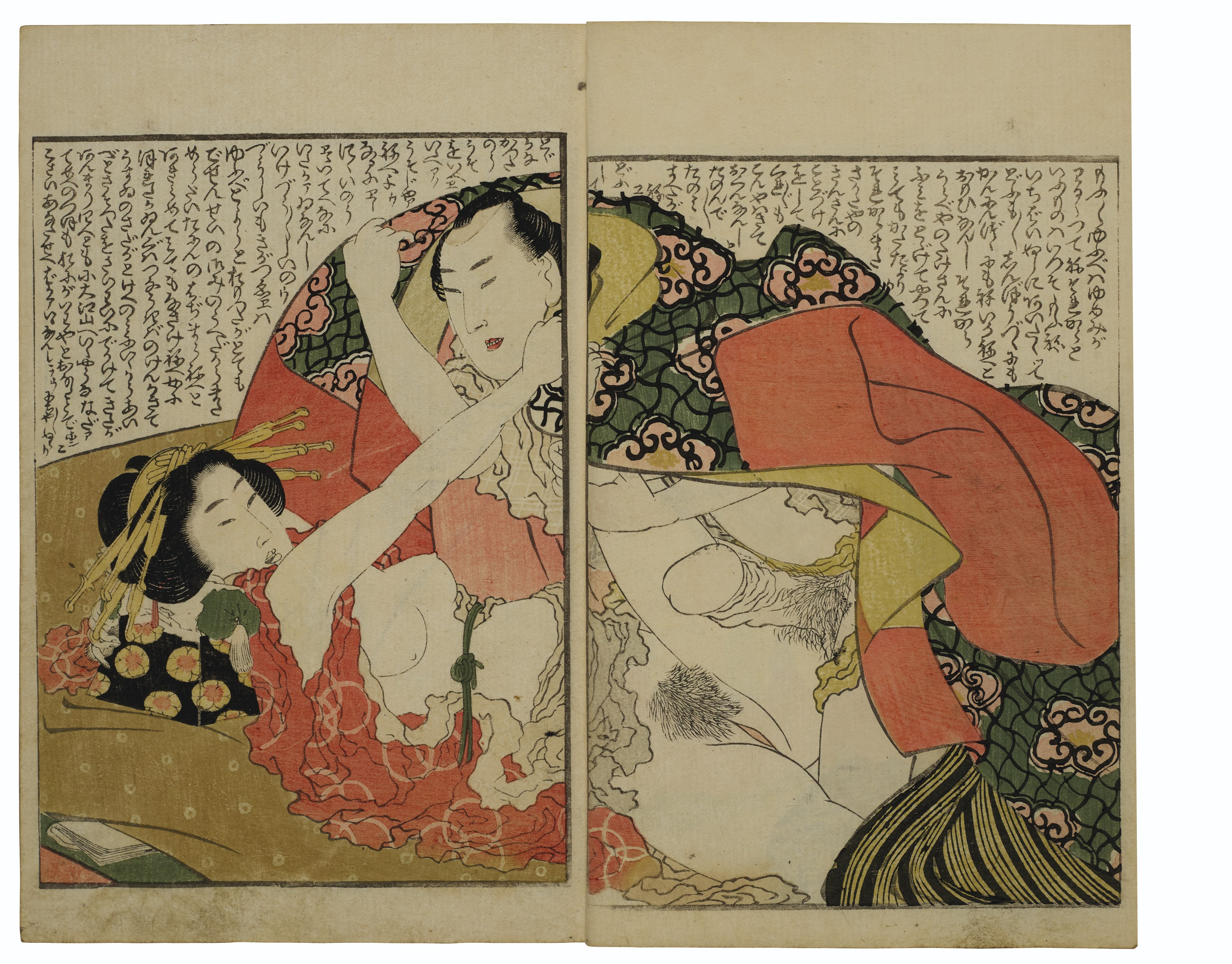
Page with a couple having sex under voluminous patterned kimonos in an interior room.

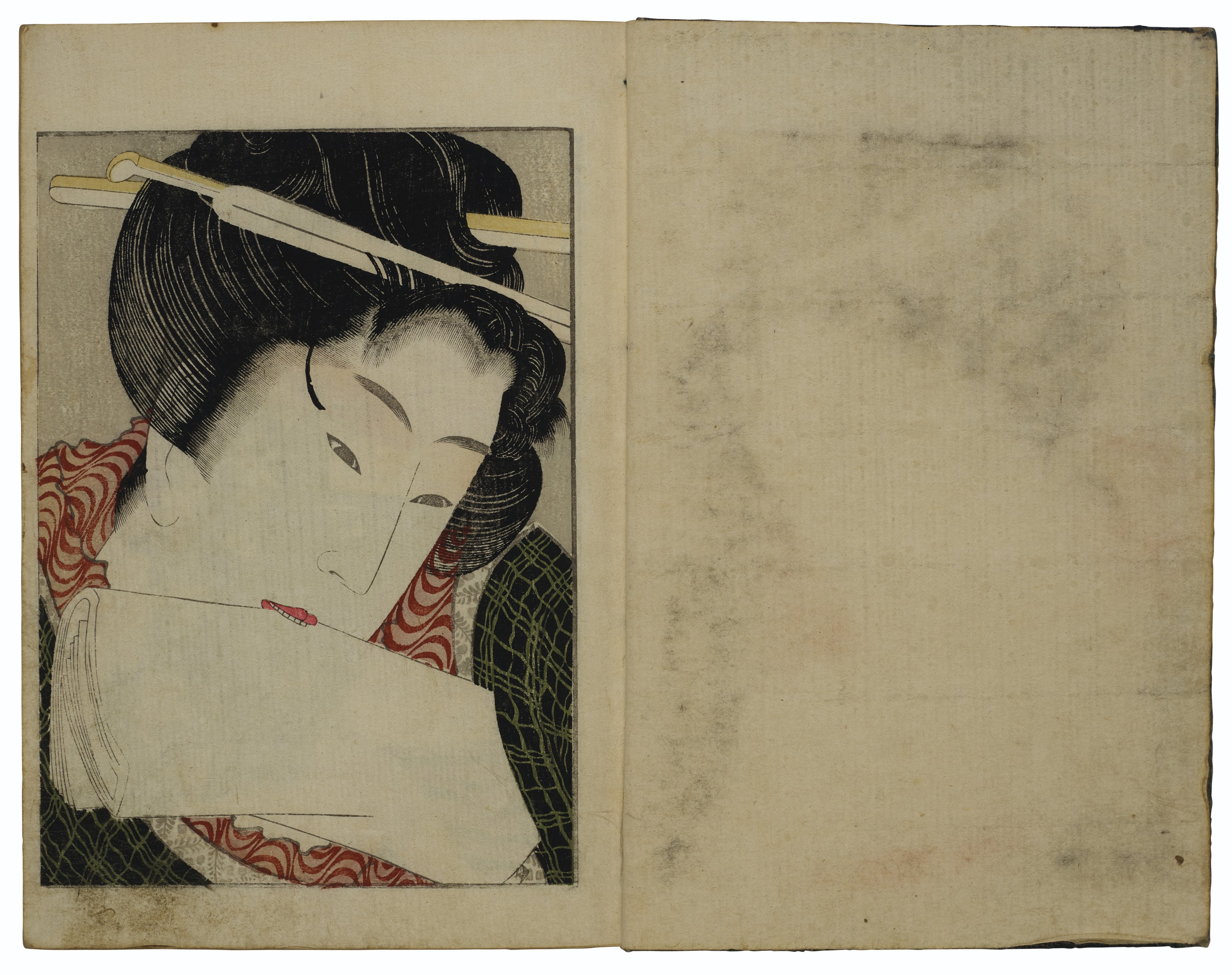
Page with a half-length portrait of a courtesan biting a piece of cloth in a strongly suggestive image.

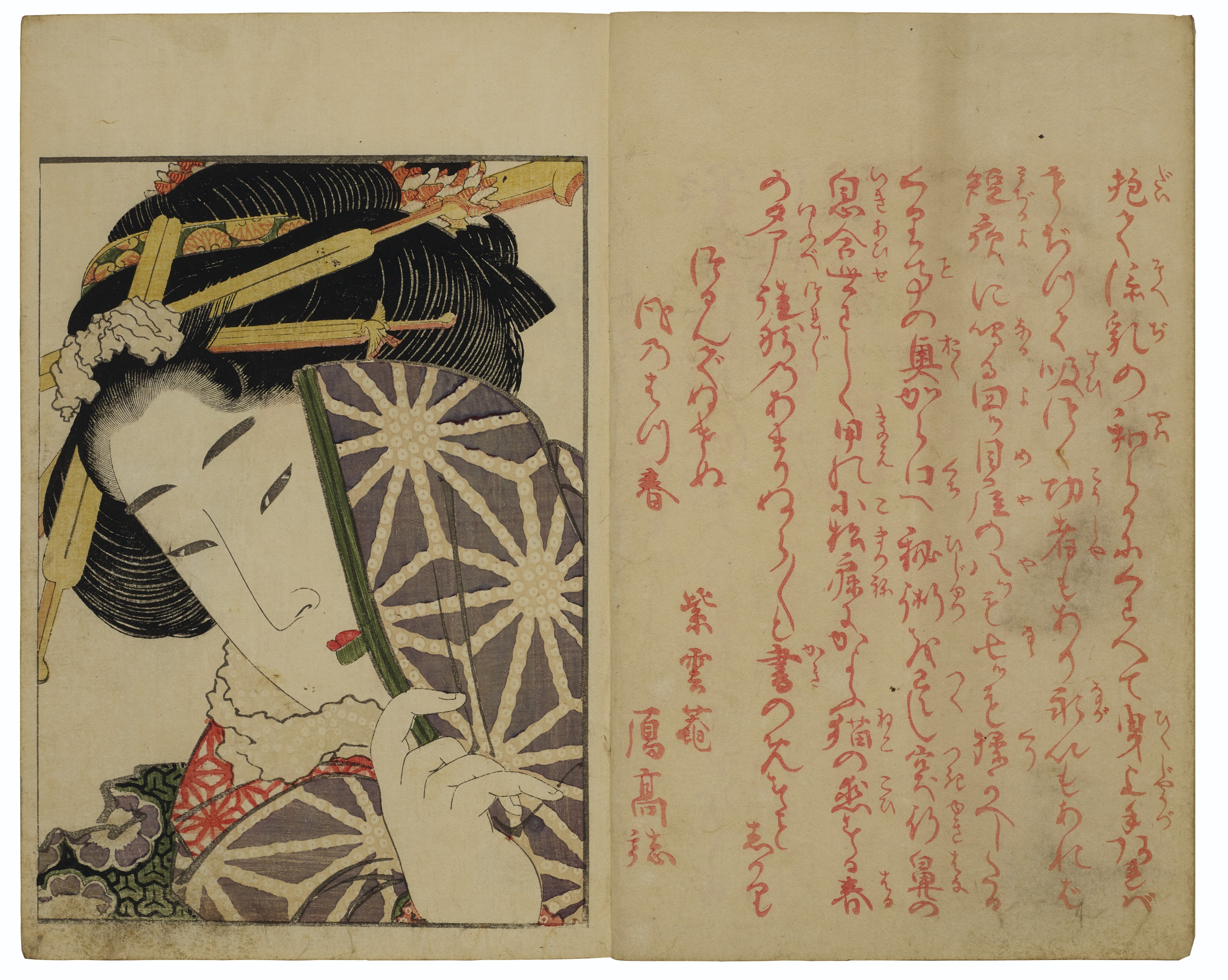
Page showing a portrait of a courtesan behind a fan, accompanied by text written in red ink.

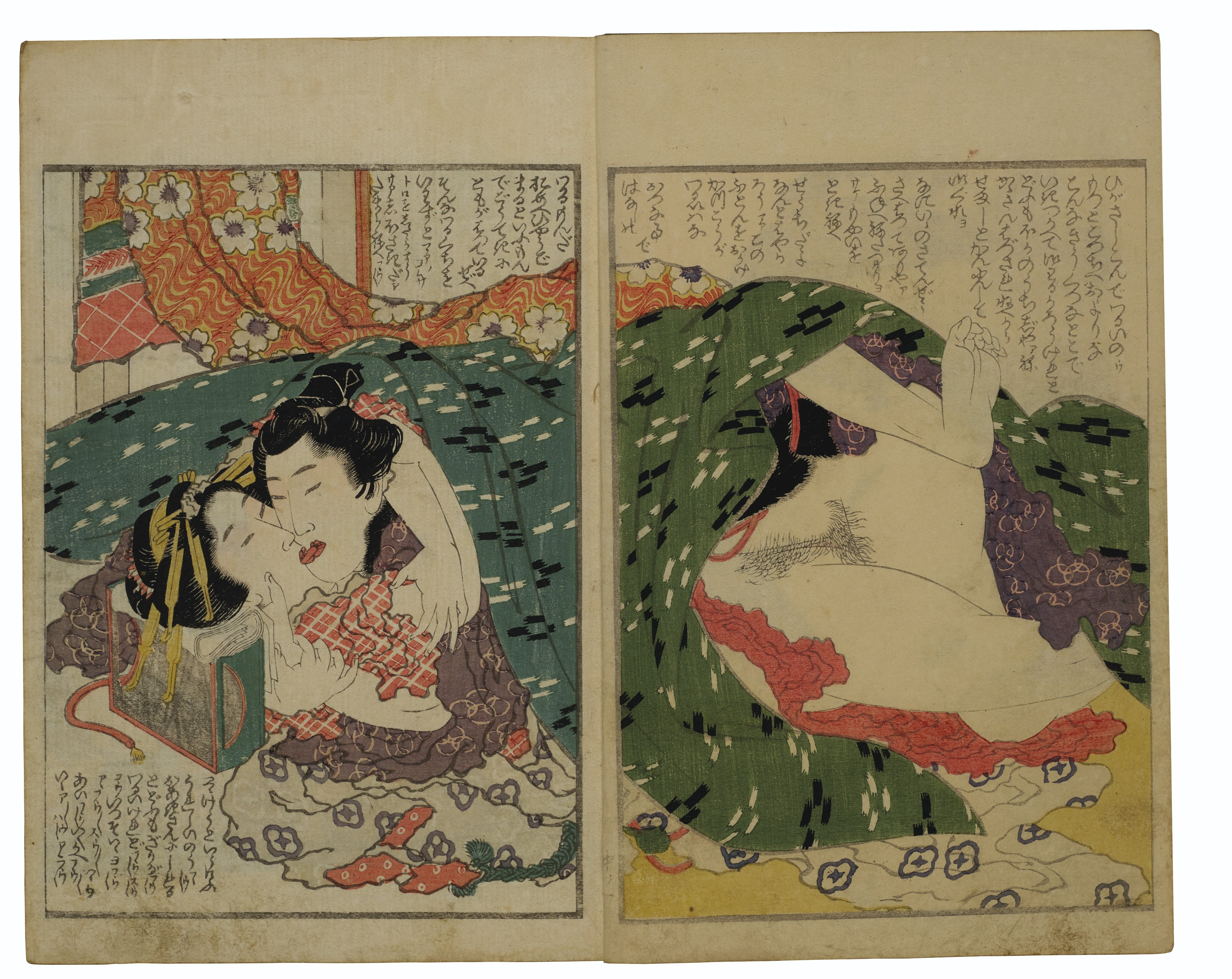
Page in which a couple kisses and lies under a large patterned quilt inside a decorated room.

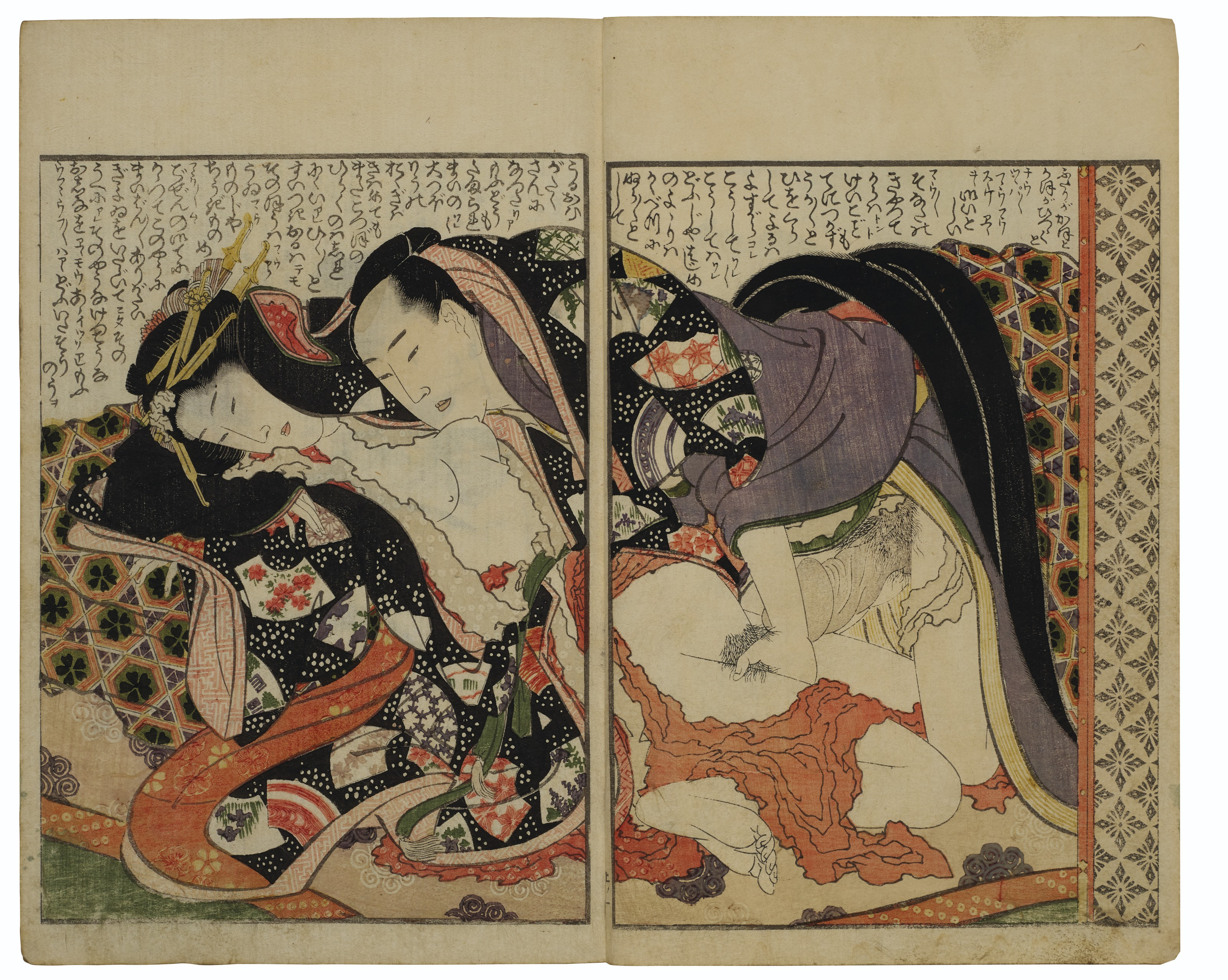
Page with a couple having sex, wrapped in richly patterned kimonos.

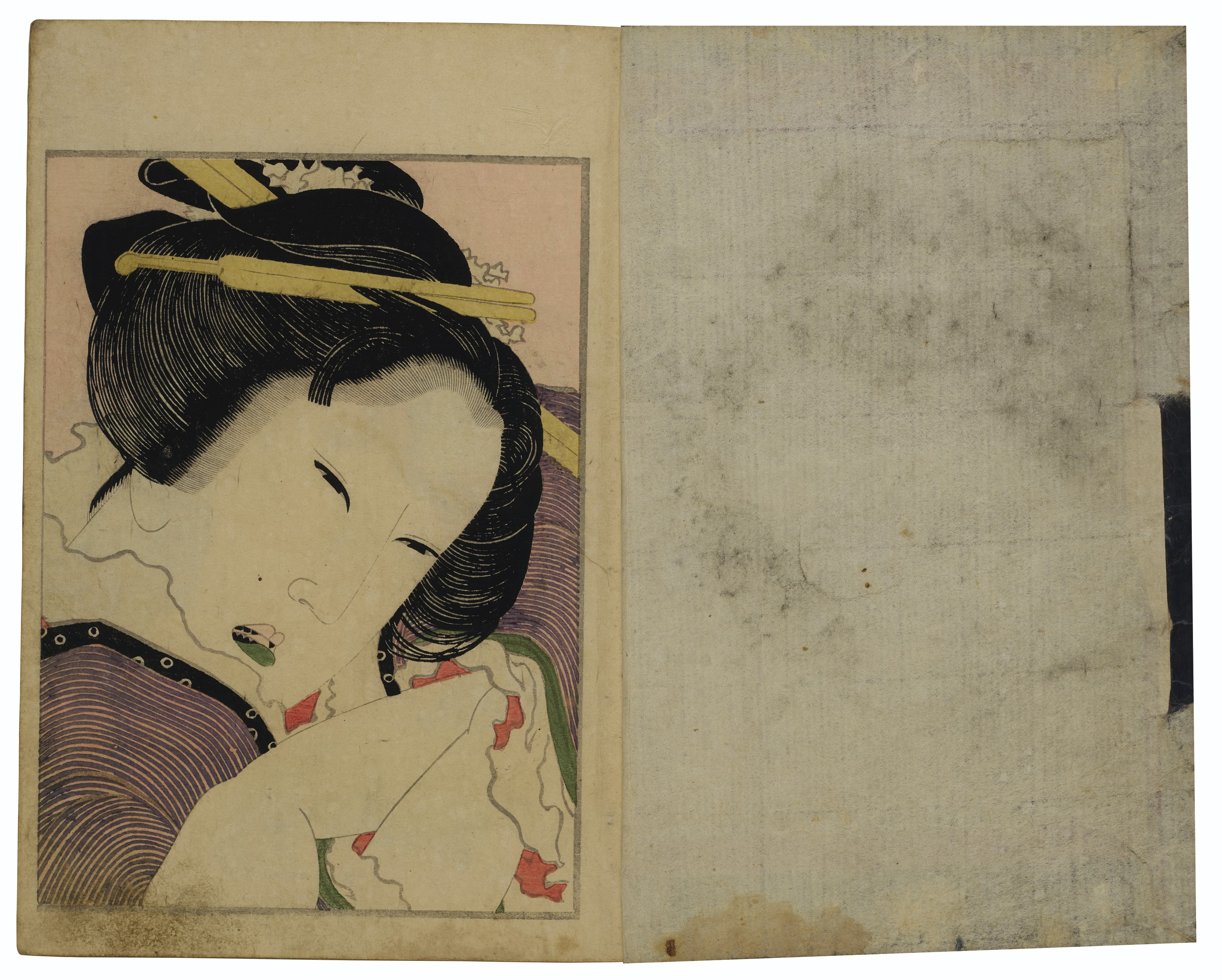
Page with a half-length portrait of a woman with a languid gaze, suggesting an erotic atmosphere.

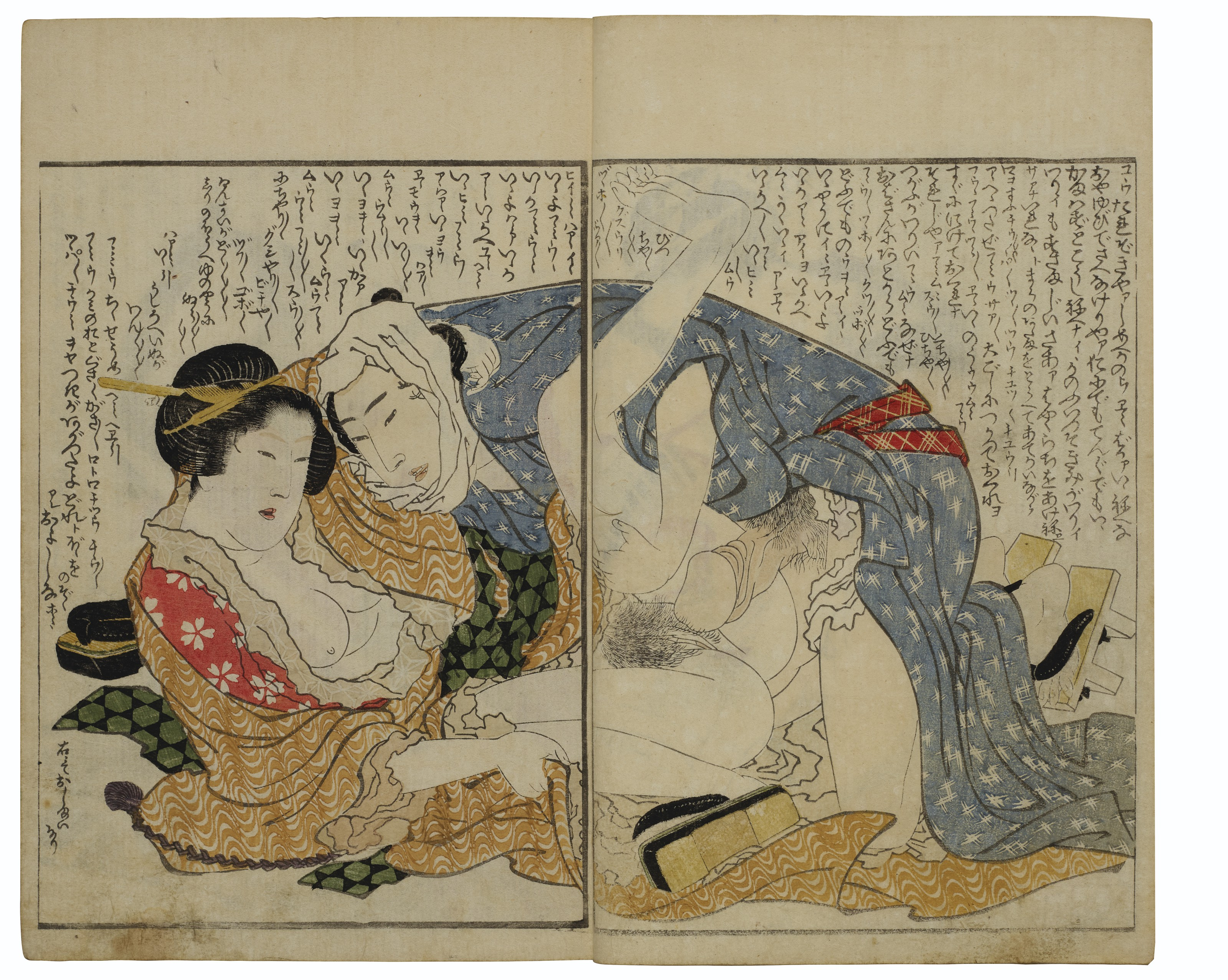
Page with a couple in an intimate scene, bodies partly covered by a blue kimono, with sandals on the floor.

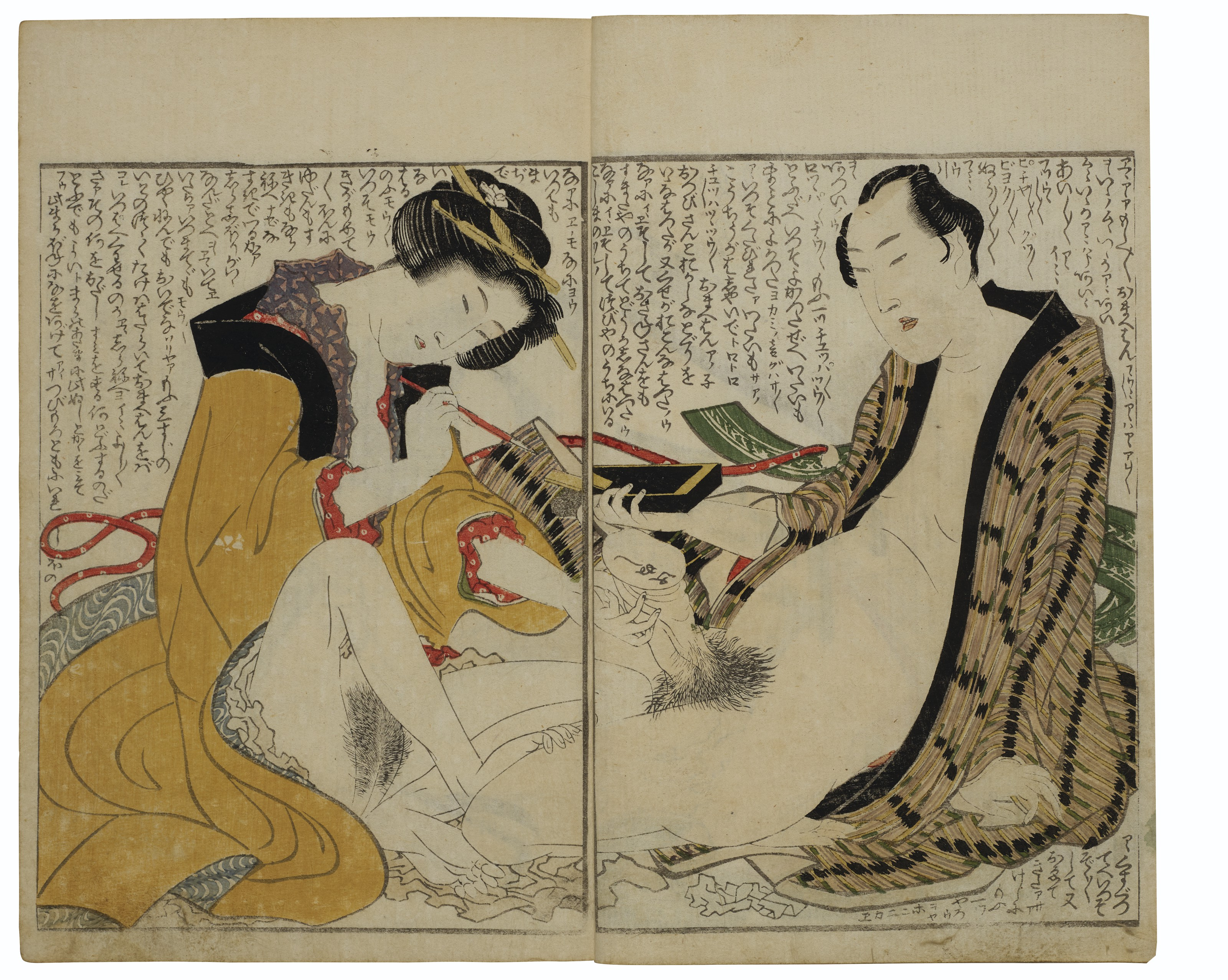
Page showing a woman on top of her partner, both nude under open kimonos, in a room with explanatory text.

== Sources ==
- Uhlenbeck, Chris; Margarita Winkel; Ellis Tinios; Amy Reigle Newland (2005). Japanese Erotic Fantasies: Sexual Imagery of the Edo Period. Hotei. ISBN 90-74822-66-5.
