= Bison (disambiguation) =

Bison is a taxonomic group containing six species of large even-toed ungulates, among them the extant American bison and European bison (the wisent).

Bison or Bisons may also refer to:

== Places in the United States ==
- Bison, Kansas, a city
- Bison, Oklahoma, an unincorporated community
- Bison, South Dakota, a town
- Bison, West Virginia, an unincorporated community
- Bison Township, Perkins County, South Dakota, a township

== People ==
=== Surname ===
- Giuseppe Bernardino Bison (1762–1844), Italian painter

=== Nickname or ring name ===
- Béla I of Hungary (1016–1063), King of Hungary nicknamed "the Bison"
- Bison Dele (1969–2002, né Brian Carson Williams; presumed dead 2002), American professional basketball player
- Matt Kemp (born 1984), American baseball player nicknamed "The Bison"
- Bison Smith, ring name of American professional wrestler Mark Smith (1973–2011)

== Arts and entertainment ==
=== Fictional characters ===
- Bison (comics), a Marvel comic book supervillain
- M. Bison, the main antagonist in the Street Fighter franchise
- Balrog (Street Fighter), known as Mike Bison or M. Bison in Japan, in the Street Fighter video game series
- Bison, nickname of the protagonist of Bison Kaalamaadan, a 2025 Indian Tamil-language film

=== Music ===
- Bison (indie folk band), an American band
- Bison (metal band), a Canadian band
- "Bison" (song), by The Fireman

=== Other arts and entertainment ===
- Bison (novel), 2014, by Patrick Grainville
- Bison (sculpture), a c. 1960 work by an unknown artist in Eugene, Oregon, US
- Bison (Siemering), a 1902 work by Rudolf Siemering in Berlin, Germany
- Bison (2014 film), a Canadian short film

== Businesses ==
- BISON, a collaboration between a group of computer companies (Bull, ICL, Siemens, Olivetti, and Nixdorf) that subsequently became X/Open
- Bison Transport, a Canadian transportation and warehousing
- Bison Radio Network, which broadcasts North Dakota State Bison athletics
- Bison Company, Bison Life Motion Pictures, or Bison 101 Company, an early 20th century film studio that became part of Universal Studios
- Bison industrialised building system, a precast concrete building system used in high rise flats, developed by Bison Manufacturing Ltd, Dartford, Kent

== Military ==
- 15 cm sIG 33 (Sf) auf Panzerkampfwagen I Ausf B, sometimes called the Sturmpanzer I Bison, a German self-propelled heavy infantry gun of World War II
- 15 cm sIG 33 auf Fahrgestell Panzerkampfwagen II (Sf), sometimes called the Sturmpanzer II Bison, a German self-propelled heavy infantry gun of World War II
- Avro Bison, a biplane spotter aircraft
- Bison (armoured personnel carrier), a Canadian fighting vehicle
- Bison Mobile Pillbox, a British improvised mobile pillbox of 1940
- Mikoyan-Gurevich MiG-21 Bison, an upgrade variant of the MiG-21bis fighter jet for the Indian Air Force
- Myasishchev M-4, a Soviet Cold War-era strategic bomber, NATO reporting name Bison
- Operation Bison (Jammu & Kashmir 1948), an Indian Army assault in the Indo-Pakistani war of 1947–1948
- Opération Bison, the French military operation in Chad in 1969–1972
- PP-19 Bizon or bison, a Russian submachine gun
- Bison, a French Guépard-class destroyer sunk in 1940 during the Norwegian campaign

== Sports teams ==
=== Professional ===
- Basingstoke Bison, an ice hockey club from the UK
- Bisons de Neuilly-sur-Marne, a French ice hockey team based in Neuilly-sur-Marne
- Boulder Junior Bison, a junior A ice hockey team in Boulder County, Colorado
- Bristol Bisons RFC, an English rugby union team
- Buffalo Bisons (disambiguation), numerous Buffalo, New York, teams (baseball, basketball, football and hockey)
- Granby Bisons, a junior ice hockey team in Granby, Quebec, Canada, since renamed
- Kentucky Bisons, an American Basketball Association team
- Loimaa Bisons, a Finnish basketball team in Loimaa, Finland
- Okotoks Bisons, a junior B ice hockey team in Okotoks, Alberta, Canada
- Bisons, a former name of the Mid-Missouri Mavericks, a defunct minor league baseball team
- Wainwright Bisons, a junior B ice hockey team in Wainwright, Alberta

=== Collegiate ===
- Bucknell Bison, the athletic teams of Bucknell University
- Howard Bison and Lady Bison, the teams of Howard University, Washington, DC
- North Dakota State Bison, the teams of North Dakota State University, Fargo, North Dakota
  - Bison Sports Arena
- Bisons, the teams of Gallaudet University, Washington, DC
- Bisons, the teams of Harding University, Arkansas
- Bisons, the teams of Lipscomb University, Nashville, Tennessee
- Bisons, the teams of Nichols College, Dudley, Massachusetts
- Bisons, the teams of Oklahoma Baptist University, Shawnee, Oklahoma
- Manitoba Bisons, the athletic teams of the University of Manitoba, Canada

== Technology ==
- GNU bison, a parser generator that is part of the GNU project
- Birmingham Solar Oscillations Network (BiSON)

== Vehicles ==
- Chevrolet Bison, heavy duty trucks manufactured between 1977 and 1988
- Cosmos Bison, an ultralight aircraft

== See also ==
- Bizon (disambiguation)
- Bisone, a frazione of the Italian commune of Cisano Bergamasco
