= Stomil Bydgoszcz =

Company, Bydgoszcz, Poland, 20th and 21st century

Coordinates: 53°07′7.9″N 18°05′18.58″E

STOMIL
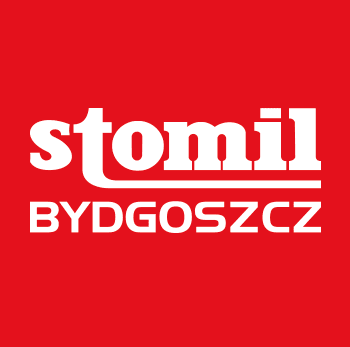

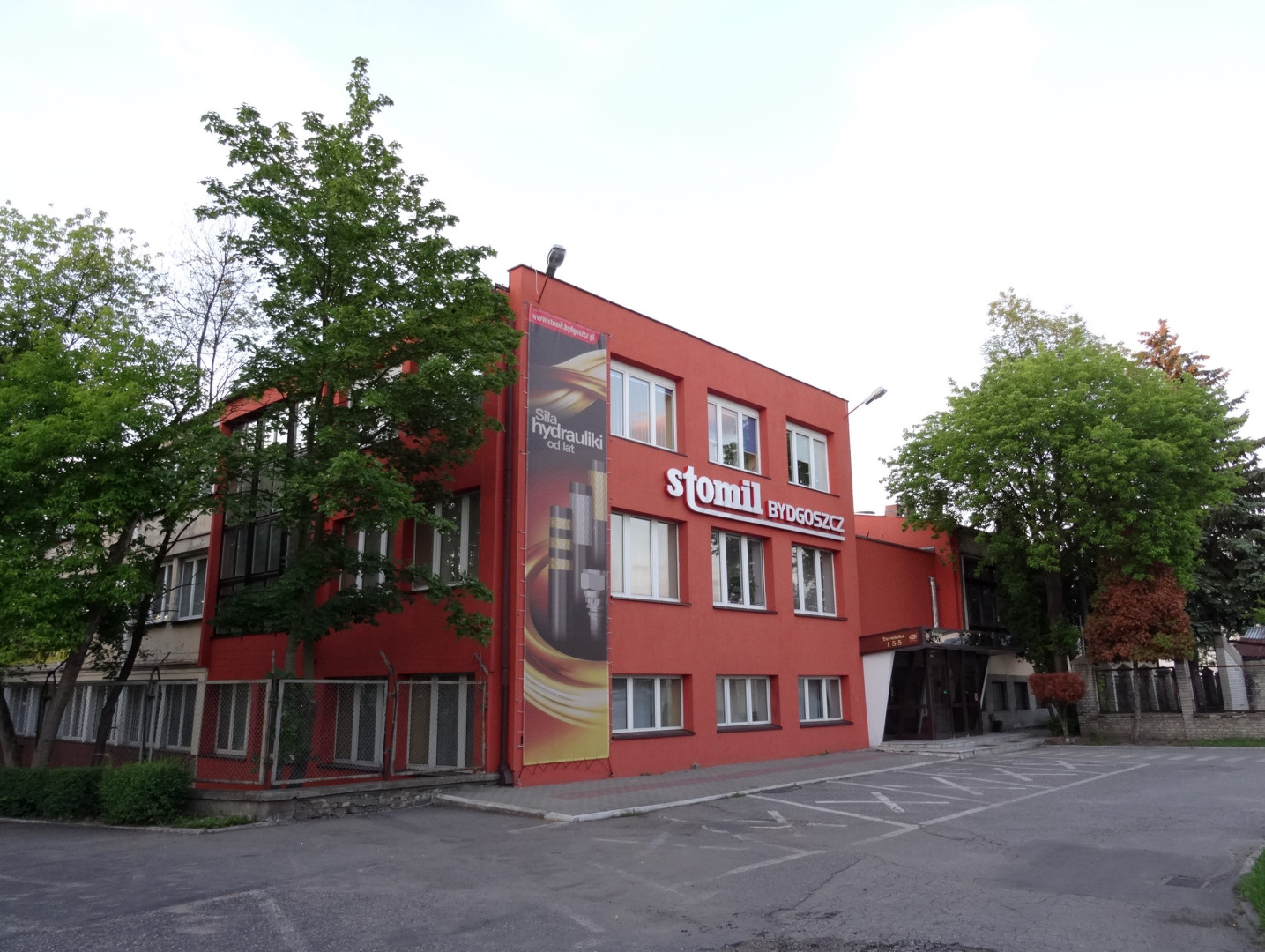
- Headquarters in Bydgoszcz
- Native name: Bydgoskie Zakłady Przemysłu Gumowego „Stomil” Spółka Akcyjna
- Company type: Private limited company
- Industry: Rubber production
- Predecessor: "Kauczuk" company, Bydgoszcz
- Founded: 1920; 106 years ago
- Headquarters: 155 Toruńska Street, Bydgoszcz, Poland
- Products: Rubber hoses, plates, gaskets and compound
- Website: stomil-bydgoszcz.pl/en/

Stomil Bydgoszcz is a Polish company which manufactures rubber products. Founded in 1920, it is based in Bydgoszcz, Poland.

== History ==
=== Interwar period ===
Initially, a firm called Kauczuk (Polish: Bydgoska Spółka Akcyjna "Kauczuk") had been registered in 1920 in Warsaw, with a capital of 100 million Polish marks. At that time, there was only one rubber factory in Poland, located in Wolbrom and set up in 1911. The latter stopped operating at the start of WWI.

Between 1918 and 1923, other Polish rubber manufacturing sites were established, such as Brage in Warsaw or PePeGe in Grudziądz. In Bydgoszcz, the construction of the Kauczuk factory started in 1921 on a roughly 23 hectares (57 acres) plot along the Brda river. The site on today's Zimne Wody district used to host a Żegluga Bydgoska's sawmill that burned down. The laying of the cornerstone was local event reported in the city newspapers in 1920. As a matter of equipment, the most modern machine tools for processing rubber were imported from England. The factory started operating in mid-1923 and reached its full capacity a year later. At that time, 200 people were working there.

The first production catalogue comprised insulating tapes, rubber and asbestos-rubber boards, coated fabrics, ebonite, molded articles, inner tubes and bicycle tires. The natural rubber used in the manufacturing process was imported in majority from Dutch East Indies, Africa and South America. In 1928, a rubber hose production department was opened.

The plant was then one of the five largest in Poland and the most important chemical industry site in the city, which also hosted the Pezetka Polish Rubber Plant (Polish: Polskie Zakłady Gumowe "Pezetka"). Employment peaked 500 in 1928 and products were successfully competing with German goods, in particular in Gdańsk.

During the Great Depression, the firm, after a first bounce, had to halt production from 1934 onwards, due to the devastated economic situation. In 1937, the plant was leased and renamed Spółka Dzierżawna Fabryka Wyrobów Gumowych "Kauczuk", with three main shareholders, Zofia and Bernard Cisewscy and Maria Maciaszek. As a result, only 70 people were now employed and the output was principally centered on rubber floor coverings and shoe mats.

=== German occupation ===
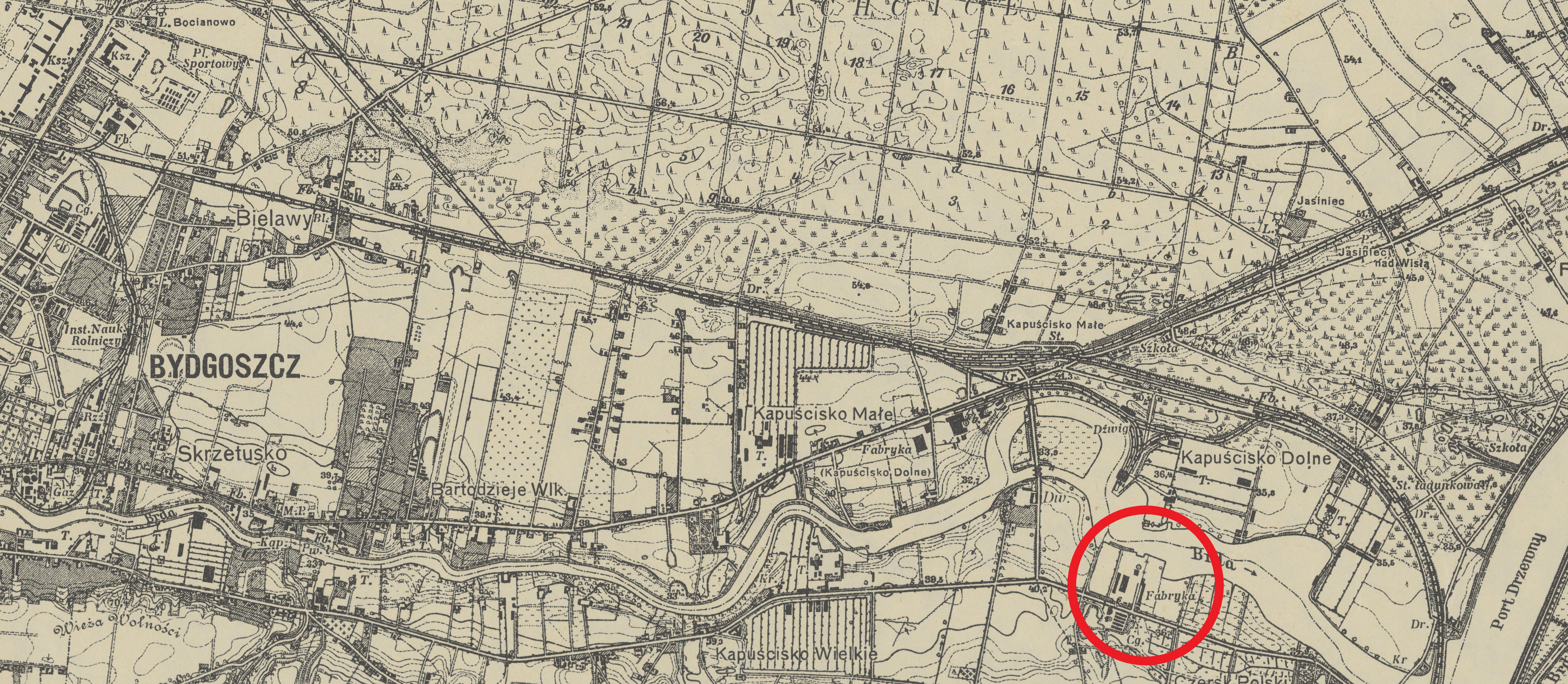
Location of the "Kauczuk" site on a 1927 map

In 1939, Nazi forces took over the management of the factory and renamed it Gumiwarenfabrik - Kautschuk (English: Kautschuk-Rubber goods factory). Only Poles worked there, mainly women, but the executive positions were held by Germans. An additional line was established for war support, producing Wehrmacht field kitchens, cannon parts, chassis and gun carriages and eventually, at the end of the conflict, outboard engines for submarines. During the war, the employment grew from 150 in September 1939 to 1,000 people in 1944 (including 600 Soviet prisoners of war).

=== Polish People's Republic (1947–1989) ===
On 4 April 1945 the plant was taken back by Polish authorities. The Soviet military forces had included the plant on the list of 30 economic facilities in Bydgoszcz which equipment was to be exported to USSR. Finally, the deportations were avoided thanks to the intervention in May 1945 of the Polish officials towards the representative of the Economic Mission of the USSR in Warsaw: however, two modern lathes and ten engines were lost.

With the operations resuming, the metal department was kept active until 1946: be that as it may, the site had lost 80% of its production capacity during the war. That year, the factory was nationalized and in 1947, its name changed to Wytwórnia (English: Plant) No. 10 Kauczuk: the employment rose from 483 people in 1948 to 745 in 1954 (among whom 310 women).

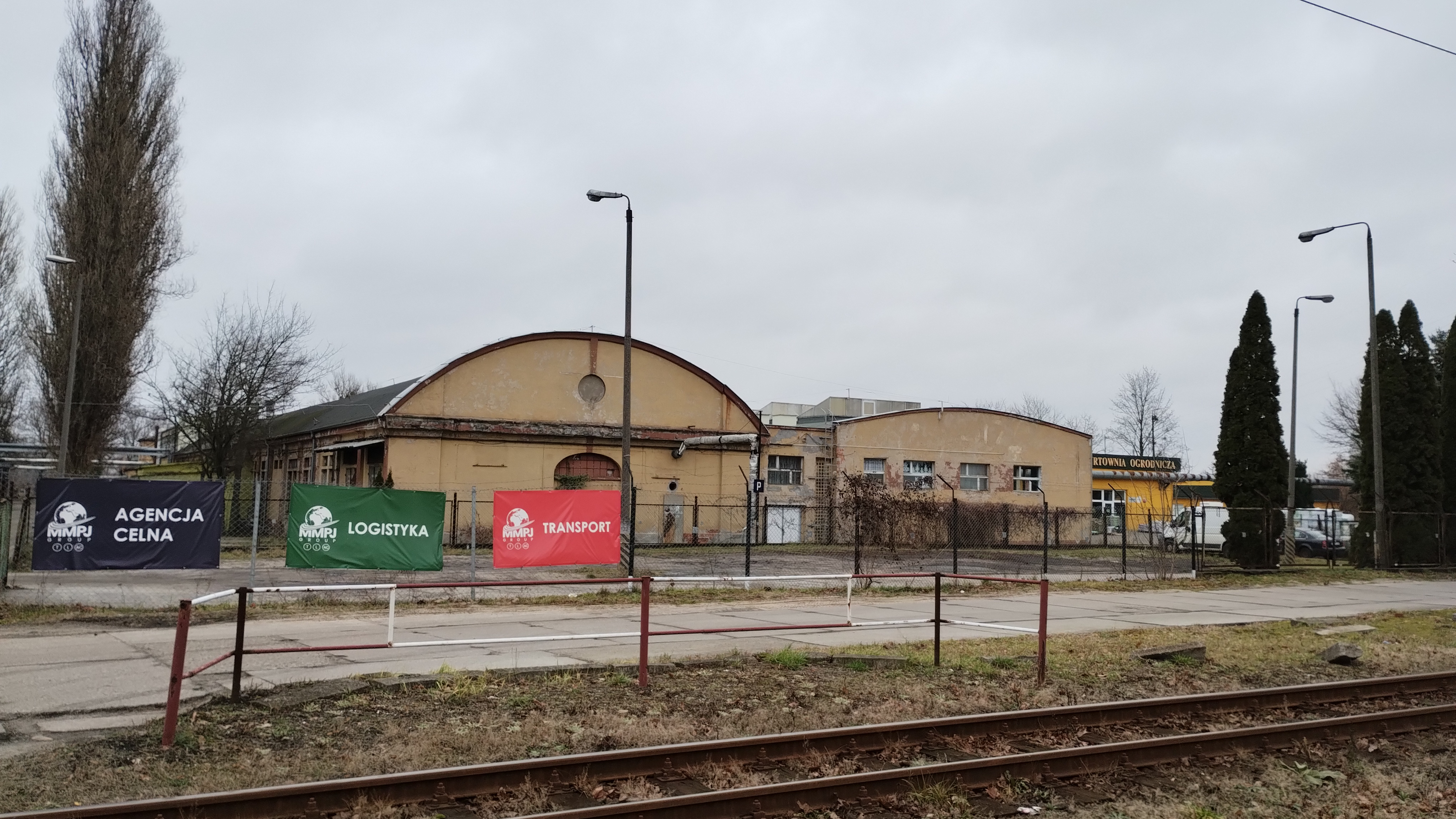
Stomil old production buildings, viewed from Toruńska Street

In 1950, the plant was renamed Bydgoskie Zakłady Przemysłu Gumowego "Kauczuk" (English: Bydgoszcz Rubber Industry Plant "Kauczuk") while the number of employees soared to 2,500 people in 1970. At its peak, this number reached 2,800 to 3,000 people.

From 1958 to 1982, the production site was incorporated to the centralized Union of the Rubber Industry "Stomil" (Polish: Zjednoczenie Przemysłu Gumowego „Stomil”), based in Łódź.

In 1960, a new hall was unveiled, allowing production of mining conveyor belts, as well as medium- and high-pressure hoses.

Since 6 October 1971 the company had operated under the label Bydgoskie Zakłady Przemysłu Gumowego "Stomil", with branches in Podgórzyn near Zielona Góra (Podgórzyńskie Zakłady Przemysłu Gumowego "Stomil") and in Łabiszyn (Zakłady Chemiczne Przemysłu Terenowego English: Chemical Plants of the Field Industry).The overall production culminated in the 1970s, in quantity as well as in diversity (e.g. high-pressure hoses, gaskets, jar rings, bottle seals, rubber wheel linings, PVC conveyor belts, rubber linings...); part of it was exported (Canada, West Germany, France, Netherlands, Finland, Greece, Austria, Soviet Union, Cuba).

In 1976, the plant faced an issue related to the poor quality of the products: as a matter of fact, due to pressure from the central administration, Stomil had to use low-quality Polish artificial fibers in place of foreign and more expensive equivalents. In the second half of the 1970s, the company also lacked brass-plated wire needed for the production of high-pressure hoses: as a result, the manufacture line was suspended until receiving the much expected material.

During this period, the plant company offered many social advantages to its employees, subsidized not only housing, but also holidays and camps for children.

=== Third Polish Republic (since 1989) ===
In the 1990s, after the collapse of the domestic mining and coal industry, Stomil Bydgoszcz refocused its production towards hydraulic hoses, while the plants in Łabiszyn and in Podgórzyn manufactured specialized items. The company went through the process of systemic economical transformation in Poland without any collective layoffs, succeeding in maintaining financial liquidity. At that time, Stomil started patronising the Medical School Complex in Bydgoszcz (Polish: Zespół Szkół Medycznych w Bydgoszczy), offering the opportunity to the students to spend holidays in the firm vacation centers in Dźwirzyno, Karpacz or Tuszyny.

On 8 June 1998 the enterprise was transformed into a "State Treasury sole-shareholder joint-stock company" (Polish: Jednoosobowa spółka Skarbu Państwa), then into the Bydgoskie Zakłady Przemysłu Gumowego "Stomil" S.A. (BZPG "Stomil" S.A.).

At the beginning of the 21st century, Stomil has kept adapting to new market conditions by undergoing deep organizational and asset restructuring. Consequently, the following investments were made:

- a Central Warehouse of Finished Products (2005);
- purchase of a modern extruding machine (2007);
- transfer of the manufacture of extruded products to Bydgoszcz (2014);
- selling of the Łabiszyn site (2016).

In 2017, BZPG "Stomil" SA recorded a significant deterioration of its financial results. As a result, on October 2, 2018, the firm moved into the capital group of the national "Industrial Development Agency" (Polish: Agencja Rozwoju Przemysłu), supporting the restructuring of Polish enterprises.

In early 2023, an information about the deteriorating economic situation of the company prompted the Supreme Audit Office to conduct an audit about the effects of the restructuring activities.

== Characteristics ==
BZPG "Stomil" S.A. is one of the leaders in the manufacturing of rubber products and the first manufacturer of hydraulic hoses in Poland. Its production reaches out various sectors: mining, building engineering, agriculture, railway industry, machine industry, chemical industry and food industry.

Since 2018, the "Agencja Rozwoju Przemysłu" holds 85% of the shares, while the State Treasury owns the remaining 15%.

The company operates according to the ISO 9002.

=== Products ===
Stomil Bydgoszcz specializes in the production of rubber hoses for hydraulics devices. Today, its main products are sold throughout Poland, via a network of distributors and sales representatives:

- hydraulic hoses;
- industrial hoses for use in water, steam, saturated air, oil, fuel, acid and base environments;
- hoses for rolling stock, plasterwork, sandblasting, pressurized concrete, gas, food substances, motor vehicles;
- rubber plates;
- rubber floor coverings and mats;
- gaskets and extruded rubber shapes;
- rubber compounds.

Stomil Bydgoszcz operates also operates an outlet company store at its headquarters in Bydgoszcz.

== See also ==
- Bydgoszcz
- Chemical industry in Poland
- Żegluga Bydgoska
- Brda river
- Toruńska Street, Bydgoszcz

== Bibliography ==
- (in Polish) Żłobińska, Łucja (1995). Bydgoski "Kauczuk" - "Stomil". Kalendarz Bydgoski ["Kauczuk" in Bydgoszcz - "Stomil". Bydgoszcz Calendar] (in Polish). Bydgoszcz: Towarzystwo Miłośników Miasta Bydgoszczy. pp. 98–101.
- (in Polish) Jarocińska-Wilk, Anna (2013). STO (MIL) w słońcu i niepogodzie. Kalendarz Bydgoski [STOMIL under good and bad weather. Bydgoszcz Calendar] (in Polish). Bydgoszcz: Towarzystwo Miłośników Miasta Bydgoszczy. pp. 55–57.
