= Bison (novel) =

2014 novel by Patrick Grainville

First edition

Bison is the twenty-fourth novel of Patrick Grainville, published in Éditions du Seuil on January 2, 2014.

== History ==
Twenty-six years after publishing "L'Atelier du peintre" Buffalo became a new occasion for Patrick Grainville to find a central character of painting. In 1845 when George Catlin came to France to introduce his paintings and Indian objects to the king Louis Philippe I, he fascinated at the same time George Sand and Charles Baudelaire who was excited with the symphony of the red and the green in his paintings.

In 1831, George Catlin decided to break with his bourgeois environment, his comfort, to leave for going around tribes to save the memory of the Indians, the disappearance of which he apprehended. The plot takes place about thirty years before Western conquest and white invasion. George Catlin established among Sioux and became the privileged observer of their rituals, hunt for the buffalo, Sundance, war with Crows, etc. He was also seen among other Red Eagle, their leader and proud warrior, Black Impetus, his brother of weapon, in the grip of changeable and dark moods, Lame Knee, impressive pisteur, White She-wolf, a crow prisoner, woman artist, rebel and loving, Two Coloured Bird, the ambiguous shaman, and Cuisses, the amazing squaw who saved her life. George Catlin painted continuously and was obsessed with the collection of objects which he intended for «his big Indian museum», until the day when White She-wolf decided to escape.

== Reception ==
Bison received generally positive reviews from literary critics. It was described as bewitching and splendid by some reviewers, and was identified by several publications as one of the notable literary novels of winter 2014. Critics also noted a stylistic shift in Patrick Grainville's writing, describing it as more restrained, modest, and respectful than in some of his earlier works, while continuing to recognize him as a master of epic poems.

Bison received the Grand prix Palatine of the historical novel on April 8, 2014 and the Literary Prize of the Caen Lycéens on April 7, 2015.

== Editions ==
- Bison, éditions du Seuil, 2014.

== See also ==
- Native Americans in the United States
- Classification of indigenous peoples of the Americas
- American Indian Wars
- Bison hunting

== Bibliography ==
Bison de Patrick Grainville, Nelcya Delanoë, Recherches amérindiennes au Québec, volume XLIII, 2013.
