= The Dream of the Fisherman's Wife =

1814 woodcut design by Japanese artist Hokusai

- Tako to Ama (蛸と海女) (Japanese)
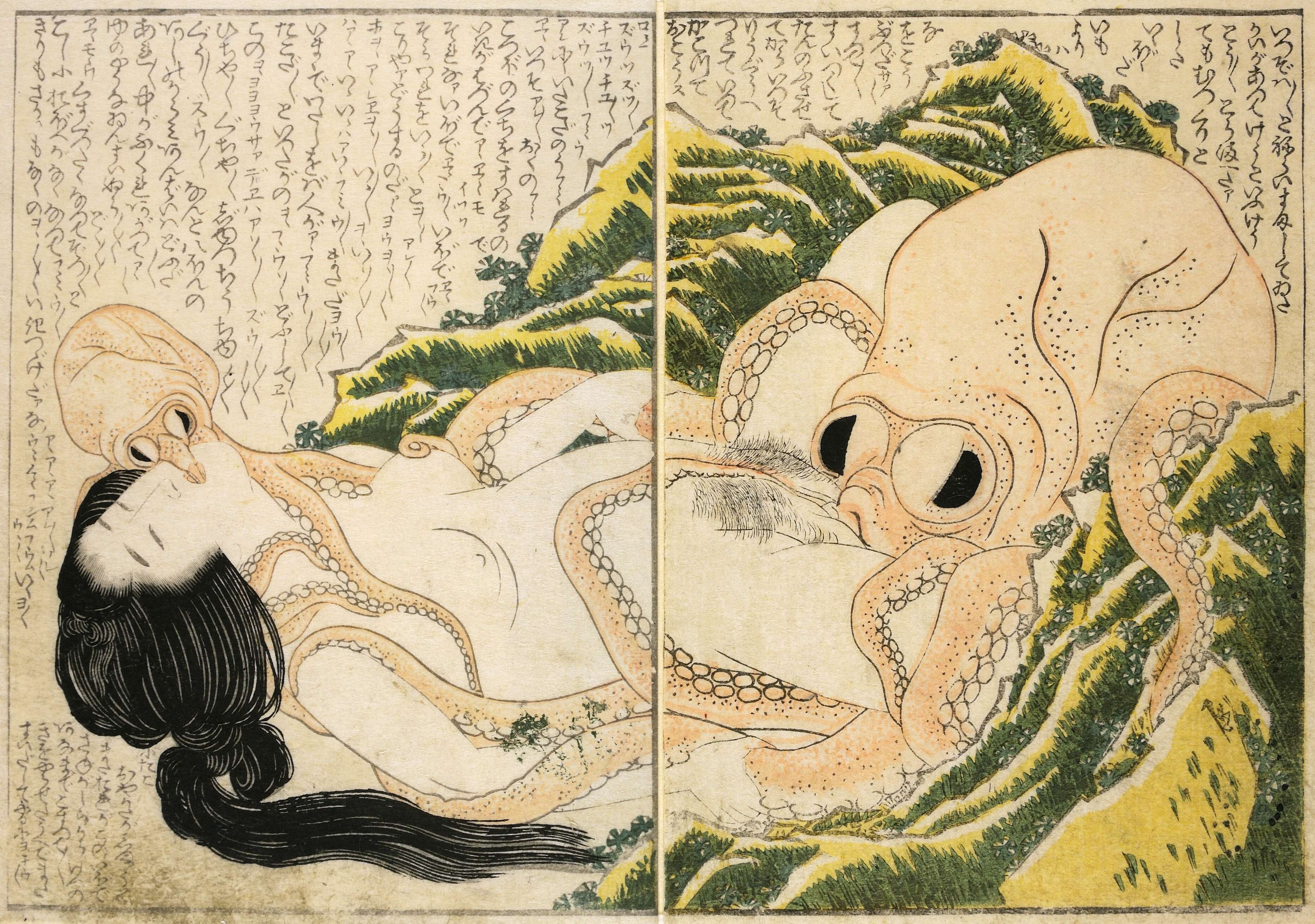
- Artist: Hokusai
- Year: 1814
- Type: Woodblock print
- Medium: Paper
- Dimensions: 19 cm × 27 cm (7.4 in × 10.5 in)

The Dream of the Fisherman's Wife (Japanese: 蛸と海女, Hepburn: Tako to Ama; "The Octopuses and the Diver"), also known as Girl Diver and Octopi, Diver and Two Octopi, etc., is a woodblock-printed design by the Japanese artist Hokusai. It is included in Kinoe no Komatsu ('Young Pines'), a three-volume book of shunga erotica first published in 1814, and has become Hokusai's most famous shunga design. Playing with themes popular in Japanese art, it depicts a young ama diver entwined sexually with a pair of octopuses.

== History and description ==
The Dream of the Fisherman's Wife is the most famous image in Kinoe no Komatsu, published in three volumes from 1814. The book is a work of shunga (erotic art) within the ukiyo-e genre. The image depicts a woman, evidently an ama (a woman who dives for seafood and pearls), enveloped in the limbs of two octopuses. The larger of the two mollusks performs cunnilingus on her, while the smaller one, his offspring, assists by fondling the woman's mouth and left nipple. In the text above the image the woman and the creatures express their mutual sexual pleasure from the encounter.

All designs in the publication are untitled; this design is generally known in Japanese as Tako to ama, translated variously into English. Richard Douglas Lane calls it Girl Diver and Octopi; Matthi Forrer calls it Pearl Diver and Two Octopi; and Danielle Talerico calls it Diver and Two Octopuses. The open book measures 16.51 cm × 22.23 cm (6.50 in × 8.75 in).

== Text on the print ==
The full text, which surrounds the maiden and octopuses, as translated by James Heaton and Toyoshima Mizuho:

LARGE OCTOPUS: My wish comes true at last, this day of days; finally I have you in my grasp! Your "bobo" is ripe and full, how wonderful! Superior to all others! To suck and suck and suck some more. After we do it masterfully, I'll guide you to the Dragon Palace of the Sea God and envelop you. "Zuu sufu sufu chyu chyu chyu tsu zuu fufufuuu..."

MAIDEN: You hateful octopus! Your sucking at the mouth of my womb makes me gasp for breath! Aah! Yes... it's... there!!! With the sucker, the sucker!! Inside, squiggle, squiggle, oooh! Oooh, good, oooh good! There, there! Theeeeere! Goood! Whew! Aah! Good, good, aaaaaaaaaah! Not yet! Until now it was I that men called an octopus! An octopus! Ooh! Whew! How are you able...!? Ooh! "Yoyoyooh, saa... hicha hicha gucha gucha, yuchyuu chyu guzu guzu suu suuu..."

LARGE OCTOPUS: All eight limbs to interwine with!! How do you like it this way? Ah, look! The inside has swollen, moistened by the warm waters of lust. "Nura nura doku doku doku..."

MAIDEN: Yes, it tingles now; soon there will be no sensation at all left in my hips. Ooooooh! Boundaries and borders gone! I've vanished...!!!!!!

SMALL OCTOPUS: After daddy finishes, I too want to rub and rub my suckers at the ridge of your furry place until you disappear and then I'll suck some more. "Chyu chyu..."

== Interpretations ==
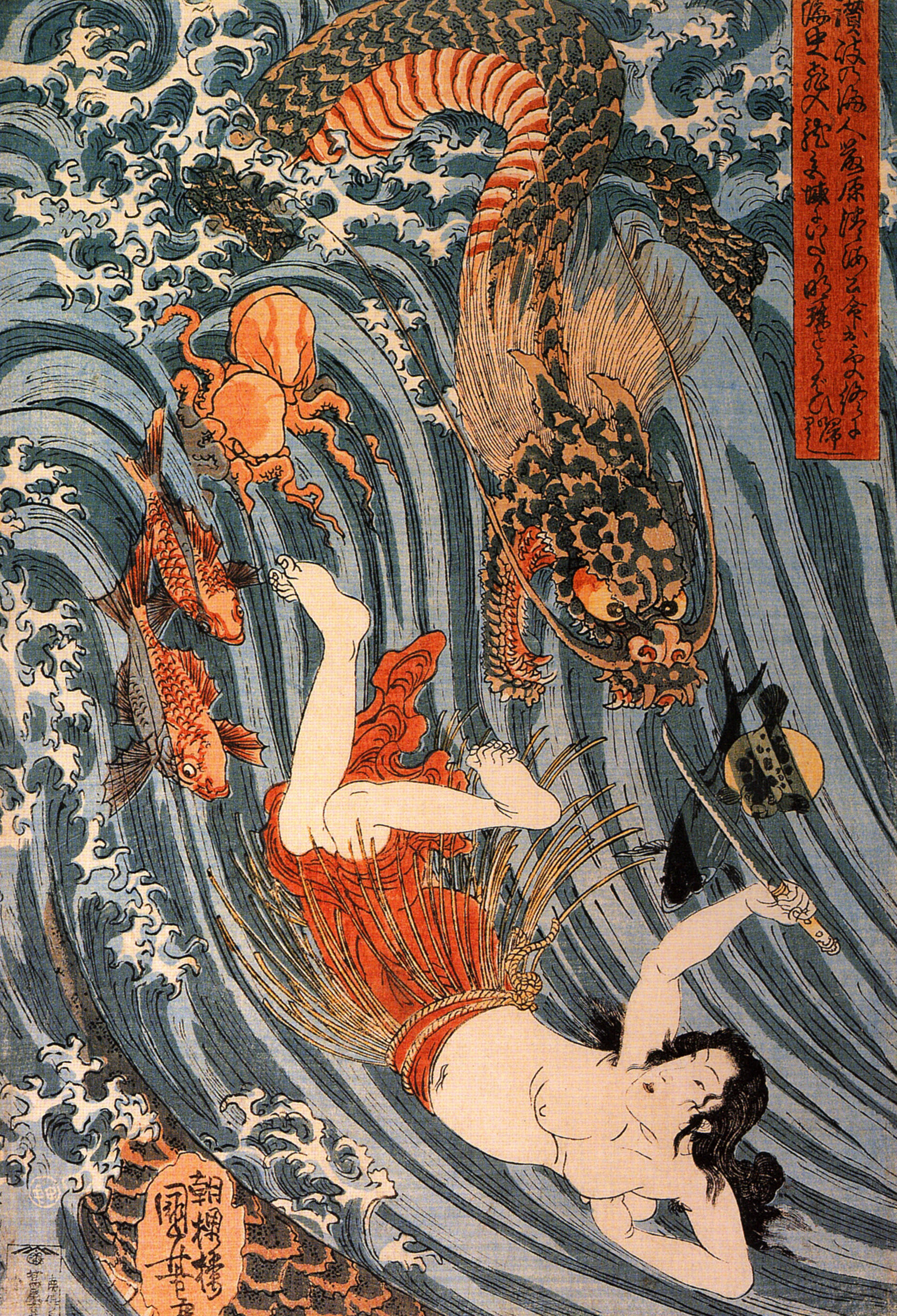
Woodblock print by Utagawa Kuniyoshi depicting Tamatori's escape from Ryūjin and his sea creatures

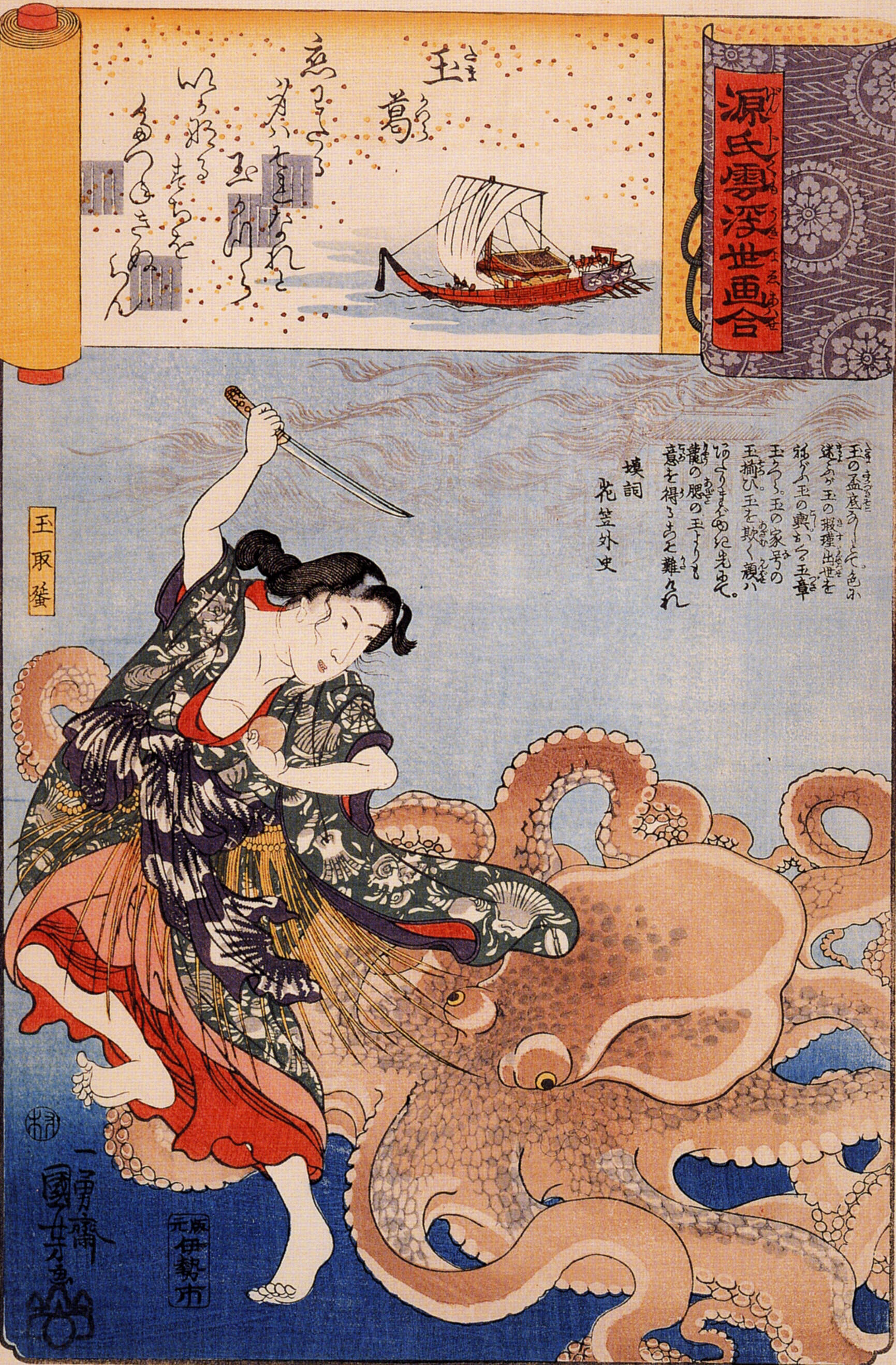
Woodblock print by Kuniyoshi depicting Tamatori fighting an octopus

Scholar Danielle Talerico notes that the image would have recalled to the minds of contemporary viewers the story of Princess Tamatori, highly popular in the Edo period. In this story, Tamatori is a modest shell diver who marries Fujiwara no Fuhito of the Fujiwara clan, who is searching for a pearl stolen from his family by Ryūjin, the dragon god of the sea. Vowing to help, Tamatori dives down to Ryūjin's undersea palace of Ryūgū-jō, and is pursued by the god and his army of sea creatures, including octopuses. She cuts open her own breast and places the jewel inside; this allows her to swim faster and escape, but she dies from her wound soon after reaching the surface.

The Tamatori story was a popular subject in ukiyo-e art. The artist Utagawa Kuniyoshi produced works based on it, which often include octopuses among the creatures being evaded by the bare-breasted diver. In the text above Hokusai's image, the big octopus says he will bring the girl to Ryūjin's undersea palace, strengthening the connection to the Tamatori legend. The Dream of the Fisherman's Wife is not the only work of Edo-period art to depict erotic relations between a woman and an octopus. Some early netsuke carvings show cephalopods fondling nude women. Hokusai's contemporary Yanagawa Shigenobu created an image of a woman receiving cunnilingus from an octopus very similar to Hokusai's in his collection Suetsumuhana of 1830.

Talerico notes that earlier Western critics such as Edmond de Goncourt and Jack Hillier interpreted the work as a rape scene. She notes that these scholars would have seen it apart from the Kinoe no Komatsu collection and without understanding the text and visual references, depriving it of its original context. Goncourt did, however, know its original context, which he describes in a passage of his monograph on Hokusai. According to Chris Uhlenbeck and Margarita Winkel, "[t]his print is testimony to how our interpretation of an image can be distorted when seen in isolation and without understanding the text."

== Influence ==
The image is often cited as a forerunner of tentacle erotica, a motif that has been popular in modern Japanese animation and manga since the late 20th century, popularized by author Toshio Maeda. Modern tentacle erotica similarly depicts sex between women and tentacled beasts; the sex in modern depictions is typically forced, as opposed to Hokusai's mutually pleasurable interaction. Psychologist and critic Jerry S. Piven is skeptical that Hokusai's playful image could account for the violent depictions in modern media, arguing that these are instead a product of the turmoil experienced throughout Japanese society following World War II, which was in turn reflective of existing, underlying currents of cultural trauma. Scholar Holger Briel argues that "only in a society that already has a predilection for monsters and is used to interacting with octopods such images might arise", citing Hokusai's print an early exemplar of such a tradition.

Dona i Pop ("Woman and Octopus") (1903, Catalan title), private drawing by Pablo Picasso

The work influenced later artists such as Félicien Rops, Auguste Rodin, Louis Aucoc, Fernand Khnopff and Pablo Picasso. Picasso drew his own private version in 1903, which was displayed in a 2009 Museu Picasso exhibit titled Secret Images, alongside 26 other drawings and engravings by Picasso, displayed next to Hokusai's original and 16 other Japanese prints, portraying the influence of 19th century Japanese art on Picasso's work. Picasso also later fully painted works that were directly influenced by the woodblock print, such as 1932's Reclining Nude, where the woman in pleasure is also the octopus, capable of pleasuring herself.

In 2003, a derivative work by Australian painter David Laity, titled The Dream of the Fisherman's Wife, sparked a minor obscenity controversy when it was shown at a gallery in Melbourne. After receiving complaints, police investigated and decided it did not break the city's anti-pornography laws. Hokusai's print has had a wide influence on the modern Japanese-American artist Masami Teraoka, who has created images of women, including a recurring "pearl diver" character being pleasured by cephalopods, as a symbol of female sexual power.

The so-called aria della piovra ("Octopus aria") Un dì, ero piccina in Pietro Mascagni's opera Iris (1898), on a libretto by Luigi Illica, may have been inspired by this print. The main character Iris describes a screen she had seen in a Buddhist temple when she was a child, depicting an octopus coiling its limbs around a smiling young woman and killing her. She recalls a Buddhist priest explaining: "That octopus is Pleasure... That octopus is Death!"

The scene is recreated in a "surreal, slightly horrific form" in Kaneto Shindo's 1981 fictionalized Hokusai biopic Edo Porn. The print is featured briefly in Park Chan-wook's film The Handmaiden and is intended to illustrate the perverted nature of Uncle Kouzuki's oppression of Lady Hideko to Sook-Hee. The print is given more air time in several episodes of the television series Mad Men, first on the office wall of a senior CEO, perhaps as a symbol of "monstrous alpha male power"; the print is given to Peggy Olson by Roger Sterling, Jr. near the series' end. Olson decides to hang the print in her office, part of the culmination of her storyline of becoming comfortable as an executive.

The print has been cited by Isabel Coixet as influencing a sexual scene in her film Elisa & Marcela, as a "non-masculine sexual reference".

== Bibliography ==
- Bing, Alison; Heartney, Eleanor; Hoffman, Kathryn (2006). The madness and perversion of Yukio Mishima. Chronicle Books. ISBN 0-8118-5097-8.
- Briel, Holger (2010). "The Roving Eye Meets Traveling Pictures: The Field of Vision and the Global Rise of Adult Manga". In Berninger, Mark; Ecke, Jochen; Haberkorn, Gideon (eds.). Comics As a Nexus of Cultures: Essays on the Interplay of Media, Disciplines. McFarland. pp. 187–210. ISBN 978-0-7864-3987-4. Retrieved 9 November 2010.
- Bru, Ricard (2010). "Tentacles of love and death: from Hokusai to Picasso". Secret Images. Picasso and the Japanese Erotic Print. London: Thames & Hudson. pp. 50–77. ISBN 978-0-5000-9354-2.
- Forrer, Mathi (1991). Hokusai: Prints and Drawings (Exhibition catalogue). Munich: Prestel. ISBN 3-7913-1131-X.
- Lane, Richard (1978). Images from the Floating World, The Japanese Print. Oxford: Oxford University Press. ISBN 978-0-19-211447-1. OCLC 5246796.
- Lenehan-White, Anne. "Shunga and Ukiyo-e: Spring Pictures and Pictures of the Floating World". www.stolaf.edu. Archived from the original on 4 February 2009.
- Mallach, Alan (2002). Pietro Mascagni and his Operas. UPNE. ISBN 9781555535247.
- Piven, Jerry S. (2004). The madness and perversion of Yukio Mishima. Greenwood Publishing Group. ISBN 0-275-97985-7.
- Schwarz, Karl M. (1995). Netsuke Subjects: A Study on the Netsuke Themes with Reference to their Interpretation and Symbolism. Tuttle Publishing. ISBN 0-8048-2026-0.
- Symmes, Edwyn C. (1995). Netsuke: Japanese Life and Legend in Miniature. Böhlau Verlag Wien. ISBN 3-205-05515-2.
- Talerico, Danielle (2001). "Interpreting Sexual Imagery in Japanese Prints: A Fresh Approach to Hokusai's Diver and Two Octopi". Impressions, The Journal of the Ukiyo-e Society of America. Vol. 23.
- Uhlenbeck, Chris; Margarita Winkel; Ellis Tinios; Amy Reigle Newland (2005). Japanese Erotic Fantasies: Sexual Imagery of the Edo Period. Hotei. ISBN 90-74822-66-5.
