= Metamorphosis (manga) =

Hentai manga

- Cover of English edition

変身 - Emergence (Henshin - Emergence)
- Genre: Psychological drama Hentai
- Manga
- Written by: Shindo L
- Published by: Wanimagazine
- English publisher: NA: FAKKU
- Magazine: Comic X-Eros
- Original run: 26 July 2013 – 26 March 2016
- Volumes: 1

Metamorphosis (変身, Henshin) (Note: Also referred to online by its nHentai ID, 177013.) — originally subtitled Emergence — is a hentai manga written and illustrated by American-Japanese manga artist Shindo L. It was originally published between 2013 and 2016 through Comic X-Eros.

== Plot ==
Saki Yoshida (吉田咲), a nerdy, socially awkward first-year high school student, decides to change her appearance and enlists her mother's help in getting a makeover. While at a convenience store, an older man, Hayato, compliments and invites her to a karaoke box. There, he gives Saki alcohol and MDMA before raping her, claiming he loves her. Though intoxicated, Saki believes the encounter is consensual and professes her love to him as well. He leaves her unconscious, but inputs his cell phone number into her phone. The two start dating in secret, and she quickly gets addicted to having sex while on drugs.

When Saki discusses her family's financial struggles, one of her friends from school recommends compensated dating. Saki makes an appointment with an older man named Kumagai. After having dinner with Kumagai, he takes her to a hotel and offers her additional money to stay with him, eventually raping her. Saki returns home late and breaks down, whereupon her mother comforts her.

At school, Saki is approached by a group of male students who have photographic evidence of her encounter with Kumagai, which they use to blackmail her for sexual favors. After Saki's father is laid off, he begins drinking heavily and rapes Saki in her room. He confesses this to Saki's mother, but is dishonest about the nature of the incident and instead alleges that Saki had seduced him. Enraged, Saki's mother savagely beats her before evicting her.

Saki drops out of school and begins spending more time with Hayato, who has accumulated eight million yen in debt at a local heroin bar. The bar owner, Mr. Obata, threatens to kill Hayato if he does not repay. Saki begins accepting money for sexual favors from various bar patrons in order to accumulate the means to help Hayato pay his debt.

Saki drastically alters her appearance again, bleaching her hair, getting spray tans, and acquiring various piercings and tattoos, including one of Hayato's name on her chest. Her various sexual encounters frequently result in pregnancy, causing her to receive regular abortions. Saki soon finds herself returning to Kumagai, who, unimpressed with her body modifications, forces her to do increasingly degrading things to earn his payment. Mr. Obata sexually assaults Saki with other workers at the bar, injecting her with heroin to make her more compliant. She quickly develops an addiction and begins to forget about paying off Hayato's debt in favor of buying drugs. When Saki is robbed and Hayato only finds drugs in her wallet, he furiously breaks up with her, leaving her homeless.

While under the influence in a public park, she is raped by two homeless men. The following day, Saki discovers she is pregnant again, but decides to carry the baby to term, vowing to quit drugs and turn her life around in the process. She continues her prostitution to earn money, and resumes her heroin use to mitigate her physical pain. While putting some of her savings into a duffel bag in a public coin locker, she runs into a group of male and female students who assume the money is stolen, not believing that Saki could have earned so much on her own. They brutally rape her with various objects and beat her stomach, causing her to begin miscarrying, and steal her cash before leaving.

Bleeding profusely, Saki stumbles into the restroom, becoming horrified at the sight of herself in the mirror. She ties her hair into braids and puts on a pair of glasses, emulating her middle school self, before wailing in anguish and shattering the mirror. Figuring that she has nothing left to live for, Saki overdoses on her entire remaining volume of heroin. Saki imagines a future in which she had been able to happily raise her daughter, and dies with a smile on her face.

== Characters ==
Saki Yoshida (吉田咲, Yoshida Saki)
A shy, friendless student. After graduating from middle school, she decides to make more friends, transforming her own image from a quiet, geeky girl to a sex-addicted gyaru.

Her appearance after her high school makeover is partly based on Rin Shibuya of the Idolmaster franchise.

The back cover illustration of the Japanese and original English physical releases (with the dust jacket removed) is an omake offering the possibility that the story was just a pornographic film, and the porn star playing Saki is still alive. The digital version of the original English release also includes this as one of the extras at the end of the book. However, the expanded English release does not, and within its own extras the author reiterates that he intended Saki to die at the end.

Hayato (ハヤト, Hayato)
Saki's "boyfriend", who tricked Saki into an illusion of loving him, and eventually turning her into a puppet of his will, and manipulating her into a drug-addicted prostitute.

== Publication ==
Henshin - Emergence was first serialized in Japan in Comic X-Eros from 26 July 2013 to 26 March 2016. It was later published in tankōbon format on 31 May 2016, and a paperback version was published on 30 June 2016. It was published in English as Metamorphosis by FAKKU digitally on 27 October 2016 and physically in February 2017; a hardbound edition subtitled "Hard Edition" was announced at Anime Expo 2022 and released at Anime Expo 2024.

== Reception ==
Reviewers have described Metamorphosis as highly depressing and disturbing to read, albeit while also praising the storyline and editorial quality. The Manga Sanctuary staff reviewer was more critical, criticizing the sex scenes for seemingly serving no purpose except to be transgressive, and questioned the value of the work, failing to see any underlying message or moral.

Some manga artists have created derivative works based on Metamorphosis.

The depressing nature of the ending led readers to create an alternate ending in which Saki is saved by Josuke Higashikata and Okuyasu Nijimura from the JoJo's Bizarre Adventure series.

== Analysis ==
Shindo L claimed he "originally had Kafka in mind" when he thought up the title, inspired by the short story of the same name, drawing comparisons to the dark themes and plots surrounding transformation. He initially intended for the story to end with the suicide of Saki. However, Wanimagazine editors wished for a happier ending, which led him to draw the dream sequence as a form of compromise. He also writes in the manga's afterword that he intended Metamorphosis to portray the "charm" of a miserable female protagonist.

== Publications ==
- Shindo, L (w, a). 変身 (31 May 2016). Wanimagazine, ISBN 978-4-86269-430-0, (in Japanese). Retrieved 18 August 2020.
- Shindo, L (w, a). Metamorphosis (10 November 2016). FAKKU, ISBN 978-1-63442-060-0. Retrieved 18 August 2020.
- Shindo, L (w, a). Metamorphosis: Hard Edition (4 July 2024). FAKKU, ISBN 978-1-63442-503-2. Retrieved 6 September 2024.
