= No Sleep for Kaname Date – From AI: The Somnium Files =

2025 video game

- Release art, depicting Kaname Date, Iris Sagan, Aiba, Hina Tsukiyono and Akemi.
- Developer: Spike Chunsoft
- Publisher: Spike Chunsoft
- Director: Kazuya Yamada
- Producer: Yasuhiro Iizuka
- Designers: Akira Okada; Yoshihito Ogura
- Programmers: Yasushi Takashina; Yasuhiro Takahashi
- Artist: Yūsuke Kozaki
- Writer: Kazuya Yamada
- Composer: Keisuke Ito
- Engine: Unity
- Platforms: Nintendo Switch; Nintendo Switch 2; Windows; PlayStation 4; PlayStation 5; Xbox Series X/S
- Release: Switch, Switch 2, Windows; July 25, 2025; PS4, PS5, Xbox Series X/S; February 26, 2026
- Genres: Adventure, visual novel, escape room
- Mode: Single-player

No Sleep for Kaname Date – From AI: The Somnium Files (Note: Known in Japan as Date Kaname Never Sleeps – From AI: Somnium File (Japanese: 伊達鍵は眠らない – From AI：ソムニウムファイル, Hepburn: Date Kaname wa Nemuranai – From Ai: Somuniumu Fairu)) (/aɪ/ EYE) is a 2025 visual novel adventure video game developed and published by Spike Chunsoft. The third entry in the series, it is a spin-off set between the events of AI: The Somnium Files (2019) and AI: The Somnium Files – Nirvana Initiative (2022). The story follows the detective Kaname Date as he tries to rescue the internet idol Iris Sagan, who claims to have been abducted by aliens and forced to solve escape room puzzles to survive. Gameplay is presented in both visual novel format and third-person exploration for dream investigation sequences and the newly introduced escape room puzzle sequences, reminiscent of Spike Chunsoft's earlier series Zero Escape.

No Sleep for Kaname Date – From AI: The Somnium Files was released in July 2025 for Nintendo Switch, Nintendo Switch 2, and Windows, and in February 2026 for PlayStation 4, PlayStation 5, and Xbox Series X/S. It received generally favorable reviews from critics.

== Synopsis ==
=== Setting ===
Shortly after the events of AI: The Somnium Files, Kaname Date, an agent of the Advanced Brain Investigation Squad (ABIS), and Aiba, an artificial intelligence partner housed in his cybernetic left eye, investigate the alleged alien abduction of internet idol Iris Sagan. Date uses a process called "Psyncing" to enter the Somnium, or dream world, of persons of interest and extract information to help solve the case. Meanwhile, Iris is allowed by her abductor, a reptilian woman named Akemi, to remain in contact with Date and Aiba, who assist her in solving escape room puzzles for her survival.

== Development and release ==
No Sleep for Kaname Date – From AI: The Somnium Files is written and directed by Kazuya Yamada, who worked as a designer on the previous two games. Series creator Kotaro Uchikoshi, who wrote the first two games, acted as the "series director" and "scenario supervisor", while character designer Yūsuke Kozaki and music composer Keisuke Ito reprise their roles.

The game was originally conceived as a smaller, experimental spin-off, though Uchikoshi noted that by the end of development it resembled a full sequel. Kaname Date was chosen as a returning protagonist due to fan requests for more focus on his character. Yamada described the workload of acting as both director and scenario writer as "hell".

A key innovation was the introduction of escape room style puzzles, a new gameplay mechanic designed to complement and diversify the existing Somnium investigation sequences. The developers aimed to balance these multiple styles of gameplay, with several difficulty options to ensure players would feel an appropriate level of challenge in each puzzle.

The game was announced during a Nintendo Direct on March 27, 2025, and released for Nintendo Switch, Nintendo Switch 2, and Windows on July 25 the same year. Versions for PlayStation 4, PlayStation 5, and Xbox Series X/S released on February 26, 2026.

== Reception ==
Reception

Aggregate scores
Aggregator	Score
Metacritic	PC: 78/100; NS: 79/100; NS2: 68/100
OpenCritic	73% recommend

Review scores
Publication	Score
Famitsu	8/10, 8/10, 9/10, 8/10
Nintendo Life	7/10
Nintendo World Report	7.5/10

No Sleep for Kaname Date – From AI: The Somnium Files received "generally favorable" reviews, according to review aggregator website Metacritic. In Japan, four critics from Famitsu gave the game a total score of 33 out of 40. George Yang of Nintendo Life gave the game a 7/10, noting the fun story, improved escape rooms and the fun cast of characters, although he found the plot twists weak and the Somnium puzzles boring, and opined a lack of meaningful Switch 2 features.
