= Yūsuke Kozaki =

Japanese manga artist and character designer

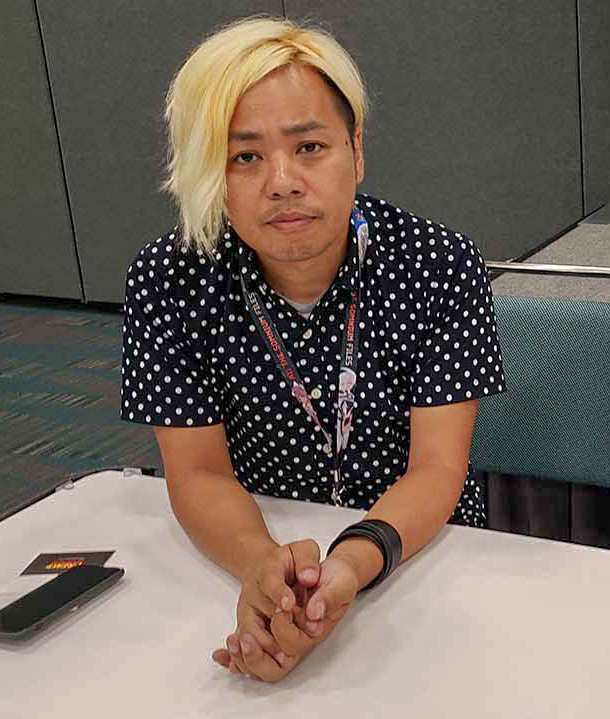
- Kozaki at the 2019 Anime Expo
- Born: May 12, 1978 (age 48)
- Occupation: Manga artist

Yūsuke Kozaki (Japanese: コザキユースケ, Hepburn: Kozaki Yūsuke; born May 12, 1978) is a Japanese manga artist and character designer.

== Works ==
=== Manga artist ===
- Kaeru wa Tori Tsudzuke (蛙は撮り続け) (1997, Monthly Young Magazine, Kodansha, one-shot)
- Mi Kakunin Higō Shōjo Kaoru (未確認非業少女カオル) (1998, Bessatsu Monthly Young Magazine, Kodansha, one-shot)
- Naizo-kun (ナイゾウクン) (2001, Monthly Young Magazine, Kodansha, web manga)
- Spiral (スパイラル, Supairaru) (2001, Bessatsu Pachislot Panic 7, Byakuya-Shobo)
- Karasuma Kyoko no Jikenbo (2002–12, written by Ōji Kiroi, BStreet→Monthly Comic Birz, Gentosha, 10 volumes)
- Chick Dismantler (2003, Blade Gunz, Mag Garden, one-shot)
- Tokyo Karasu (東京カラス) (2005–08, Robot, Wanimagazine)
- No More Heroes 2: Desperate Struggle Erotic Comic (2010, Marvelous Entertainment)
- Donyatsu (どーにゃつ) (2011–present, Young Gangan, Square Enix, 5 volumes)
- Tokyo Karasu (written by Hiroki Miyashita, Monthly Sunday Gene-X, Shogakukan) – character design from 2012 to 2013

General source:

=== Character designer ===
Anime

- Speed Grapher (2005, Gonzo)
- Intrigue in the Bakumatsu – Irohanihoheto (2006–07, Sunrise)
- Bubuki Buranki (2016, Sanzigen)
- Under the Dog (2016, Kinema Citrus)
- Godzilla: Planet of the Monsters (2017, Toho Animation/Polygon Pictures),
- Godzilla: City on the Edge of Battle (2018, Toho Animation/Polygon Pictures),
- Godzilla: The Planet Eater (2018, Toho Animation/Polygon Pictures)
- Tiny Metal: Zero Line (TBA)

Video games

- Osu! Tatakae! Ouendan (2005, INiS/Nintendo)
- No More Heroes (2007, Grasshopper Manufacture/Marvelous Entertainment)
- Chūmon Shiyou ze! Ore-tachi no Sekai (2008, GAE)
- Half-Minute Hero (2009, Marvelous Entertainment)
- No More Heroes 2: Desperate Struggle (2010, Grasshopper Manufacture/Marvelous Entertainment)
- No More Heroes: Heroes' Paradise (2010, feelplus/AQ Interactive/Marvelous Entertainment)
- Ace Combat: Assault Horizon (2011, Bandai Namco Games) – Tie-in novel Ace Combat: Ikaros in the Sky
- Fire Emblem Awakening (2012, Intelligent Systems/Nintendo)
- Liberation Maiden (2012, Level-5/Grasshopper Manufacture)
- Puzzle & Dragons (2012, GungHo Online Entertainment)
- Unchain Blaze EXXIV (2012, Furyu) – Hilda only
- Liberation Maiden SIN (2013, 5pb./Mages)
- Ranko Tsukigime's Longest Day (2014, Grasshopper Manufacture/Bandai Namco Games)
- Tekken 7 (2015, Bandai Namco Entertainment) – Lucky Chloe and Jin Kazama only
- Fire Emblem Fates (2015, Intelligent Systems/Nintendo)
- Pokémon Go (2016, Niantic) - Team Leaders, Professor Willow and Rhi design, official player character artwork
- Fire Emblem Heroes (2017, Intelligent Systems/Nintendo)
- Xenoblade Chronicles 2 (2017, Monolith Soft/Nintendo) – Aegaeon and Agate design
- Travis Strikes Again: No More Heroes (2019, Grasshopper Manufacture)
- Daemon X Machina (2019, Marvelous)
- AI: The Somnium Files (2019, Spike Chunsoft)
- Pokémon Sword and Shield (2019, Game Freak/Nintendo/The Pokémon Company) – The Pokémon Toxel, Toxtricity, Gigantamax Toxtricity and Falinks designs
- No More Heroes III (2021, Grasshopper Manufacture)
- AI: The Somnium Files – Nirvana Initiative (2022, Spike Chunsoft)
- Pokémon Scarlet and Violet (2022, Game Freak/Nintendo/The Pokémon Company) - The Pokémon Varoom, Revavroom, Cetoddle and Cetitan designs
- Despera Drops (2023, Red Entertainment/D3 Publisher/Aksys Games)
- Wizardry Variants Daphne (2024, Drecom)
- No Sleep for Kaname Date - From AI: The Somnium Files (2025, Spike Chunsoft)
- Ace Combat 8: Wings of Theve (2026, Bandai Namco Games)

Other

- Vocaloid (2009, AH-Software) — SF-A2 Miki V2, V4
- Synthesizer V Studio 2 (2025, AH-Software) — SF-A2 Miki SV

General source:
