= AI: The Somnium Files =

2019 video game

- Developer: Spike Chunsoft
- Publisher: Spike Chunsoft (Note: Physical copies published by Numskull Games in Europe and Australia)
- Director: Kotaro Uchikoshi
- Producer: Yasuhiro Iizuka
- Designer: Akira Okada
- Programmer: Yasushi Takashina
- Artist: Yūsuke Kozaki
- Writer: Kotaro Uchikoshi
- Composer: Keisuke Ito
- Engine: Unity
- Platforms: Nintendo Switch; PlayStation 4; Windows; Xbox One
- Release: Switch, PS4, Windows: NA: September 17, 2019; JP: September 19, 2019; EU: September 20, 2019; Xbox One: WW: September 30, 2021
- Genres: Adventure, visual novel
- Mode: Single-player

AI: The Somnium Files (Note: Known in Japan as AI: Somnium File (Japanese: AI：ソムニウム ファイル, Hepburn: Ai: Somuniumu Fairu)) (/aɪ/ EYE) is a 2019 visual novel adventure video game developed and published by Spike Chunsoft. Set in near-future Tokyo, the story follows Kaname Date, a detective who investigates a string of serial killings by entering suspects' memories to extract information. Gameplay is split into two sections: first-person visual novel segments and third-person exploration. The plot progresses via branching routes, leading to multiple endings depending on choices made by the player.

The game was written and directed by Zero Escape creator Kotaro Uchikoshi. In contrast to his previous work, Uchikoshi wanted the game to reach a broader audience, and developed it with adventure game fans in mind. Gameplay was simplified, dialogue was reduced, and Yūsuke Kozaki was brought on as lead character designer due to his reputation as a manga artist. The game was first teased in 2017 under the working title Project: Psync, (Note: Stylized as PROJECT:psync) and was formally announced at the 2018 Anime Expo. It released for Nintendo Switch, PlayStation 4, and Windows in September 2019, and Xbox One in September 2021.

AI: The Somnium Files was positively received, with praise for its story, art direction, and characters, while some criticized the game's tone and trial-and-error puzzle mechanics. A sequel, AI: The Somnium Files – Nirvana Initiative, was released in 2022.

== Gameplay ==
AI: The Somnium Files divides its gameplay between visual novel sections (above), and third-person exploration (below).

AI: The Somnium Files is a single-player adventure video game with visual novel elements, in which the players assume the role of detective Kaname Date. Gameplay is split into two sections: investigating Tokyo and exploring dream worlds, known as "Somnia". The story progresses via branching routes, leading to multiple endings depending on choices the player makes. The plot is not fully revealed in a single playthrough; the player must complete every route to gather the information necessary to solve the mystery. Rather than starting from the beginning of the game after each completed route, the player can skip directly to other chapters–called "Days"–using an in-game flowchart.

Investigation sections take place from a first-person perspective. The player interacts with the environment via an on-screen cursor, similar to point-and-click video games. Date uses his artificial intelligence assistant, Aiba, to analyze crime scenes, reference databases, and receive phone calls. Aiba is also able to augment Date's field of view with optical magnification, X-ray vision, and thermography. Apart from collecting evidence, Date also gathers information via non-player characters in a visual novel format. By selecting characters with the cursor, the player is able to ask questions pertaining to the individual or the environment. During specific action-oriented segments of the game, the player may be presented with quick time events to evade danger or engage in scripted combat sequences.

Somnium exploration plays out in third-person. Date uses a device called the "Psync Machine" to enter the Somnia of subjects who withhold information from him. Within a subject's Somnium, Aiba acts as Date's avatar, taking on a humanoid form. The player controls Aiba, exploring the dream world and solving puzzles to extract information. Somnium puzzles involve examining objects within the environment and choosing an action to perform with them. The player is only able to remain in Somnia for six minutes, with each object subtracting a set amount of seconds from the timer when interacted with. If the player triggers the correct sequence of objects, a "Mental Lock" will open, allowing Aiba to venture further into the subject's subconscious. Depending on the Mental Locks the player chooses to open, the game's story will diverge upon exiting the Somnium.

== Synopsis ==
=== Setting ===
The game takes place in near-future Tokyo, and follows detective Kaname Date of the top-secret police department ABIS (Advanced Brain Investigation Squad). ABIS, led by Boss, investigates crimes through a method called "Psyncing", in which Psyncers explore the dreams (known as Somnium) of subjects via the Psync Machine. Psyncing is a process that can retrieve clues the subject is subconsciously aware of, but is limited to a maximum of six minutes for the Psyncer and subject's safety. Any longer than six minutes can damage the brain of both the Psyncer and subject, resulting in death. Date is assisted by an artificial intelligence housed in his cybernetic left eye named Aiba, who can communicate with Date, provide him with enhanced vision modes, and hack various electronics. Aiba also assists Date's dream world investigations by acting as his avatar in Somnium.

Date, who lost his left eye and all his memories six years prior, is called to investigate the murder of Shoko Nadami. He finds her daughter Mizuki Okiura at the scene, unable to speak. Date investigates Mizuki's Somnium to find out what she witnessed. Throughout his investigation, he meets several others at the center of Shoko's murder: Renju Okiura, Mizuki's father and Shoko's ex-husband; Iris Sagan, a net idol employed at Renju's talent agency; Ota Matsushita, a fan of Iris; So Sejima, a member of the National Diet; Hitomi Sagan, Iris's mother; and #89, an imprisoned assassin also known as Falco.

The plot is structured in five routes based on the player's choices in the Somnium: the left branch, which is centered on a series of murders called the New Cyclops Serial Killings, consists of the Ota route, Mizuki route, and Annihilation route; and the right branch, which discusses Date's past and the events of six years ago, consists of the Iris route and the Resolution route. The Annihilation and Resolution routes are not fully accessible until the player gathers information from other routes.

=== Plot ===
==== Left side ====
In the left branch, Date initially claims evidence that Renju may be behind Shoko's murder but later finds him dead on day 2 with his eye also missing. Boss believes their deaths are part of a new string of serial murders reenacting the Original Cyclops Serial Killings from six years ago due to their right eyes missing from their corpses. On day 3, Date Psyncs with Iris due to being seen with Renju a few hours before his death. After Iris is released from questioning, she flees with Ota's help, but she is later seen about to be murdered in a live streamed video. Date suspects that Sejima is the New Cyclops Serial Killer due to his connections to Shoko and Renju through the yakuza.

In the Ota and Mizuki routes, Date prevents Iris and Ota's murders, but the mystery is never fully solved. In the Ota route, Ota becomes concerned when Mayumi, his dementia-ridden mother, is named a suspect. Mayumi is proven innocent, but Sejima's dead body is found. Date is still at loss as to who the murderer is, as new evidence implicates Iris as the murderer. In the Mizuki route, Date secures DNA evidence that Sejima is the murderer, but Sejima, who has power over the police force, has him removed from the investigation. However, Date and Mizuki infiltrate Sejima's manor to enact revenge. Date fatally shoots Sejima and falls unconscious, but Mizuki saves him through a Psync.

In the Annihilation route, Date fails to prevent Iris and Ota's murders. Meanwhile, Pewter reveals that the original Cyclops Serial Killers were two murderers, with one of them being Rohan Kumakura, a yakuza leader who seemingly died by suicide a year ago. #89 offers information to Date about Shoko's death, as well as sharing a story about his past life as an assassin for hire before falling in love with Hitomi. When Date Psyncs with #89 for more information, he finds Boss in his Somnium. Date later uncovers a video of Boss fatally shooting Sejima and incapacitates her when he finds her at Iris and Hitomi's home. After Psyncing with Boss, Date learns that she is possessed by Saito, Sejima's son and the other Cyclops Serial Killer. Saito reveals he had been using a stolen prototype of the Psync Machine to exchange bodies with Date's acquaintances and use each body to kill the previous one, with Iris, Sejima, and Boss being long dead. In addition, Date realizes that he is inhabiting Saito's body and that his original body is #89. Saito threatens him with Hitomi's safety in exchange for his body, and despite Date acquiescing, she is still killed.

==== Right side ====
In the right branch, Date convinces Iris that she is in danger after seeing a dead body resembling her in Mizuki's Somnium. He discovers the body at a warehouse but sees Iris inexplicably alive the next evening. Iris speculates that Date may have jumped into a parallel world where she is alive after saving her in Sejima's Somnium. Renju goes missing after a car accident, but he is later seen helping #89 escape during his interrogation with Date. After several kidnapping attempts, Iris insists she is being targeted by the secret society Naixatloz.

In Iris's route, Date believes her, and when she collapses, he takes her to the prototype Psync Machine, believing he is able to revive her through Psyncing, but she dies. In the Resolution route, Date refuses to believe Iris. He learns from Hitomi that Iris has a brain tumor, which causes her to hallucinate, and she is expected to die by the end of the year. When she goes missing, Date finds the same dead body in the warehouse again, but Aiba identifies the body as Manaka, a classmate of Hitomi and Renju's. Hitomi confesses to Date that, 18 years ago, Manaka had an affair with Sejima and was murdered by Saito. This led to Hitomi raising her baby, Iris.

Saito, in #89's body, kidnaps Iris and Hitomi as hostages and uses the prototype Psync Machine to force Date into returning into their original bodies. Date recalls his past as #89: he had initially used the Psync Machine to switch bodies to protect Hitomi and Iris, but this inevitably led him to investigate the original Cyclops Killings; once Saito discovered the truth, he had forced Date to switch bodies with him, and a malfunction caused Date to lose his memories. Alerted by Aiba, Date's friends intervene and save him and Iris. When Saito threatens to shoot Hitomi, Date orders Aiba to self-destruct, killing Saito and destroying the last of her data.

Three months later, the police pays for Iris's tumor treatment, and after she recovers, Date takes her around town to pay respects to their friends. Boss secretly has Pewter reinstall Aiba in Date's left eye, who is revealed to have survived by recompiling her personality in the cloud.

== Development ==
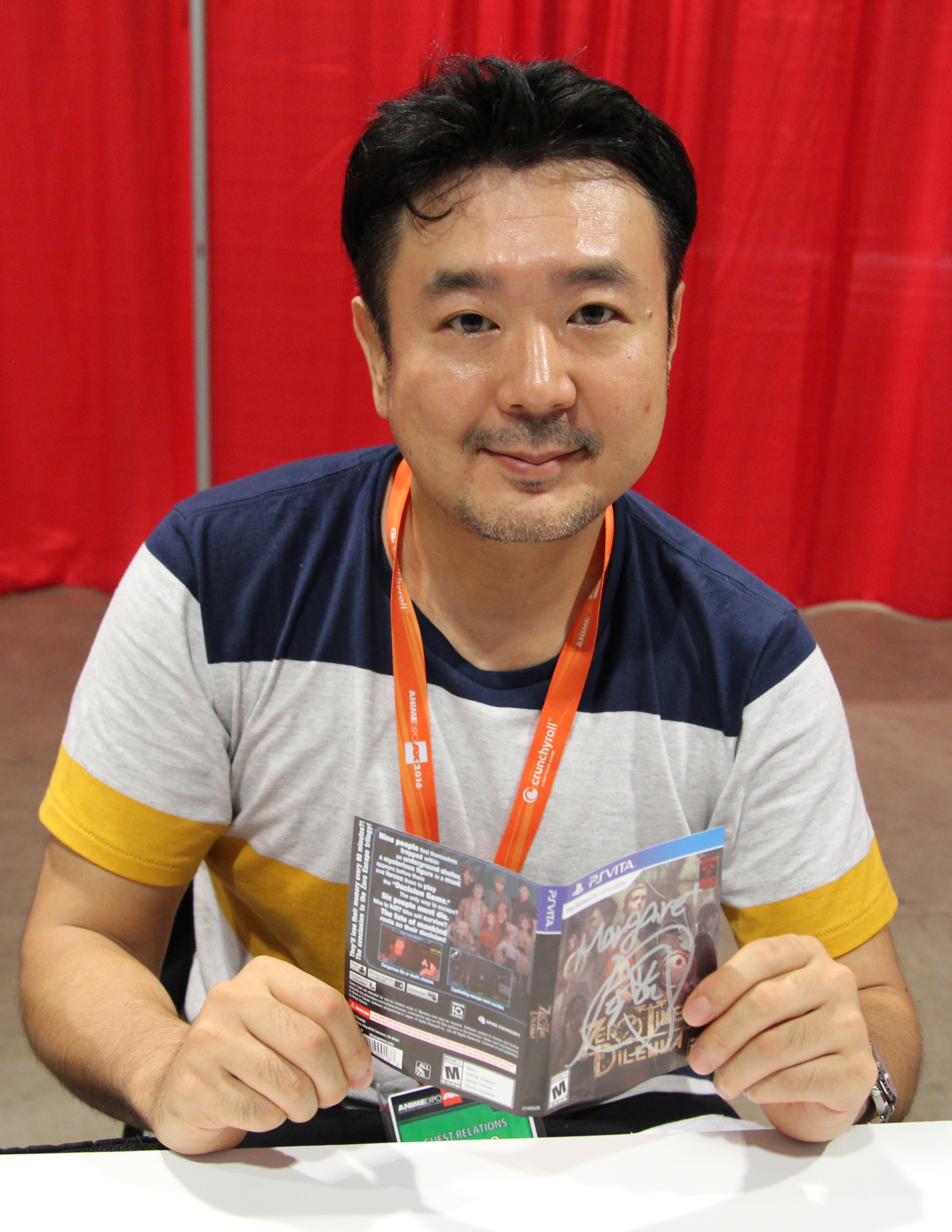
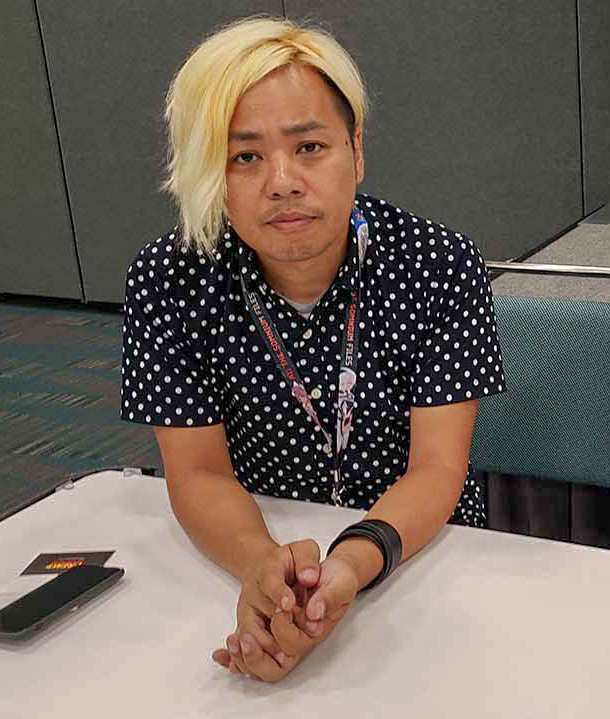
The game was written and directed by Kotaro Uchikoshi (left), with character designs by Yūsuke Kozaki (right).

AI: The Somnium Files was developed by Spike Chunsoft, and was written and directed by Kotaro Uchikoshi with character designs by Yūsuke Kozaki. Kozaki was approached by Uchikoshi for his role as character designer due to being an internationally known artist, and how Uchikoshi wanted the art to have a worldwide appeal. The game was developed with a higher budget than that of Uchikoshi's previous work, the Zero Escape series, which allowed him to express his concept for the game in a way that he was unable to with Zero Escape. Comparing AI: The Somnium Files to Zero Escape, Uchikoshi described the game as being made more with adventure game fans in mind, in contrast to Zero Escape's heavy use of cutscenes.

Two of the game's core themes are eyes and "different types and expressions of love", reflected in how the title AI is pronounced "eye" and in how "ai" (愛) is the Japanese word for love. The title also has additional meanings in that it is pronounced like the English word "I" and is short for "artificial intelligence", and the "Somnium" in the subtitle is taken from the Latin word for "dream". The idea of entering characters' dreams to solve cases was proposed by Iizuka. Uchikoshi thought it was intriguing, so he decided to use it in the game. The game's investigation-based puzzles are intentionally designed to be less difficult than those in the Zero Escape series, and are described by Uchikoshi as a modern take on the style of Hideo Kojima's 1994 adventure game Policenauts. Other influences on the game included EVE (1995) and The Silver Case (1999); Okada additionally mentioned Life Is Strange (2015), Detroit: Become Human (2018), Heavy Rain (2010) and The Walking Dead (2012–2019) as influencing his work on the game.

The game was first teased at a Game Developers Conference 2017 press event under the working title Project Psync, with a piece of artwork depicting an eye. Spike Chunsoft announced the game the following year during an Anime Expo 2018 panel, and released a first teaser trailer introducing Date. In January 2019, Spike Chunsoft started promoting the game with a YouTube and Twitter account for the character Iris.

The game was released in North America on September 17, 2019, in Japan on September 19, and in Europe on September 20 for Nintendo Switch, PlayStation 4, and Windows with both English and Japanese audio. In addition to the standard edition, a "Special Agent Edition" was also released, which included an artbook, the game's soundtrack, an Iris acrylic stand, a set of stickers, and a game box. Due to manufacturing delays and increased demand, the North American physical release was delayed until September 24, 2019. An Xbox One version was announced during Tokyo Game Show on September 30, 2021. It was released digitally on the same day, and is available to Xbox Game Pass subscribers.

== Reception ==
AI: The Somnium Files

Aggregate score
Aggregator	Score
Metacritic	(NS) 86/100 (PS4) 78/100

Review scores
Publication	Score
Famitsu	9/10, 8/10, 8/10, 9/10
GameSpot	8/10
Hardcore Gamer	4.5/5
Nintendo Life	8/10
Nintendo World Report	8/10

AI: The Somnium Files received generally positive reviews, according to review aggregator website Metacritic, and was the 12th best reviewed Nintendo Switch game of the year. Reviewers generally praised the plot and strong writing to the game; they noted it was simultaneously cerebral and thought-provoking while remaining accessible and understandable. The voice acting was also considered "superb", with the actors bringing life to the characters. The dream sequences were also praised as creative and inventive. The art and character designs received approval as well. There was also some light criticism of certain "sleazy" jokes as being not particularly funny and painting Date as less sympathetic and more of an "oaf" than he was presumably intended to be.

In Japan, the game failed to chart in the Media Create top 10 and Famitsu top 30 in its release week. The PlayStation 4 version ranked 27th with 2,267 copies sold, while the Nintendo Switch version was 33rd with 1,767 copies sold in the Dengeki top 50. The PC version of the game was among the best-selling new releases of the month on Steam. (Note: Based on total revenue for the first two weeks on sale.)

The game was nominated for "Best Adventure Game" at the Famitsu Dengeki Game Awards 2019.

== Sequels ==
A sequel, AI: The Somnium Files – Nirvana Initiative, was released in June 2022 for Nintendo Switch, PlayStation 4, Windows, and Xbox One. Uchikoshi returned to write it, while the first game's designer and assistant director Akira Okada took over as director.

No Sleep for Kaname Date – From AI: The Somnium Files, a third game in the series, was announced during a Nintendo Direct presentation on March 27, 2025. It was released on the Nintendo Switch, Nintendo Switch 2, and Windows on July 25, 2025. It is written and directed by Kazuya Yamada, with Uchikoshi credited as the "series director" and "scenario supervisor". Its story is set after the events of the first game and prior to Nirvana Initiative.
