= Nana & Kaoru =

Japanese manga series

- First tankōbon volume cover, featuring Nana Chigusa

ナナとカオル
- Genre: Erotic romance; Romantic comedy
- Manga
- Written by: Ryuta Amazume
- Published by: Hakusensha
- English publisher: NA: Fakku, Denpa
- Magazine: Young Animal Arashi (January 4, 2008 – October 2, 2009); Young Animal (October 23, 2009 – August 12, 2016)
- Original run: January 4, 2008 – August 12, 2016
- Volumes: 18
- Manga

Nana & Kaoru: Black Label
- Written by: Ryuta Amazume
- Published by: Hakusensha
- English publisher: NA: Fakku
- Magazine: Young Animal Arashi
- Original run: July 2, 2010 – April 4, 2014
- Volumes: 5
- Live-action film
- Directed by: Atsushi Shimizu
- Produced by: Mitsuru Ohshima
- Written by: Atsushi Shimizu
- Released: March 19, 2011
- Runtime: 80 minutes
- Original video animation
- Directed by: Hideki Okamoto
- Studio: AIC PLUS+
- Released: March 29, 2011
- Runtime: 24 minutes
- Manga

Nana Kao Pink Pure
- Written by: Tamami Momose
- Published by: Hakusensha
- Magazine: Young Animal Arashi
- Original run: October 7, 2011 – November 1, 2013
- Volumes: 1
- Live-action film

Nana & Kaoru: Chapter 2
- Directed by: Atsushi Shimizu
- Produced by: Mitsuru Ohshima
- Written by: Atsushi Shimizu
- Released: September 8, 2012
- Manga

Nana & Kaoru: Last Year
- Written by: Ryuta Amazume
- Published by: Hakusensha
- English publisher: NA: Fakku
- Magazine: Harem
- Original run: November 29, 2018 – October 29, 2021
- Volumes: 5
- icon

Nana & Kaoru (Japanese: ナナとカオル, Hepburn: Nana to Kaoru) is a Japanese manga series written and illustrated by Ryuta Amazume. It was serialized on Hakusensha's seinen manga magazine Young Animal Arashi (2008–2009) and Young Animal (2009–2016), with its chapters collected in eighteen tankōbon volumes. Three other manga series have also been released, as well as an original video animation and two live action films.

== Plot ==
Kaoru Sugimura is a 17-year-old virgin who has a sadomasochism fetish. He has always dreamt about an S&M relationship with his childhood friend and next-door neighbor Nana Chigusa, who is looked upon as perfect and is always the target of boys' eyes. Their relationship has somewhat deteriorated through the years, due to them hanging out with different people and because Kaoru is not taking his education too seriously. Nana has become very stressed at school, that a teacher suggests she find a way to relax. One day though, Kaoru's mother gives some of his S&M toys to Nana for safekeeping. Nana finds the leather one-piece that Kaoru bought and tries it on but accidentally locks herself in it and does not have the key. After Kaoru frees her of the one-piece, Nana soon discovers that the activity has caused her to relax and improve her academic performance. The two of them start engaging in more S&M activities which they call "breathers." The story follows their activities as they explore the world of S&M while keeping it a secret from some of their schoolmates and family.

=== Black Label ===
The story takes place several months after the end of the main series and follows Nana and Kaoru during their vacation. Kaoru has met his idol, erotic novelist Shuutarou Sarashina, by chance— who, in turn, has been inspired by Kaoru's youthful enthusiasm on the subject of S&M and invites him to help on a new book—while Nana has asked Mitsuko to tutor her on various subjects. Unbeknownst to both Nana and Kaoru, Sarashina and Mitsuko are, in fact, lovers and Mitsuko is the main inspiration for Sarashina's novels, but their feelings for each other seem to have become twisted and broken over the years. Over the course of the vacation, Nana and Kaoru encounter severe depths of S&M that they had never considered before, slowly taking a step forward in their relationship while also helping Sarashina and Mitsuko come to terms with their own feelings for each other that they have hidden with S&M for so long.

=== Kōkōsei no SM Gokko ===
A direct sequel to the original manga, which begins in Nana and Kaoru's third year of High-school. The first seven chapters take place before Black Label, with subsequent chapters taking place after.

== Characters ==
Nana Chigusa
Nana is a very popular and beautiful high school student who excels in all sorts of activities including academics, being vice-president on the student council, and on the track team. With so much riding on her, a teacher suggests she find a way to take a breather to relieve stress. She discovers that participating in the erotic S&M play as a masochist to her next-door neighbor Kaoru has completely improved her academic situation. The two had fallen out of touch to a degree in the beginning of the series, but grow closer as they begin their breathers, with Kaoru helping Nana relieve herself, from the struggles she faces being a "perfect" student. She is supported by him greatly, even when she does not realize, and gradually falls in love with him, which she realizes towards the end of the series. Their relationship further develops in the spin-off, "Black label". In the live-action films, Nana is played by Maho Nagase in the first film and by Miku Aono in the second one. In the original video animation, Nana is voiced by Kaoru Mizuhara.
Kaoru Sugimura
Kaoru is a 17-year-old virgin whose main hobby is S&M; in particular, the purchase and maintenance of S&M gear since he does not have a partner. He is secretly in love with his next-door neighbor Nana, whom he has known since they were kids, and becomes secretly overjoyed that Nana has agreed to participate in the S&M play. An average student, he rues the thought of eventually having to let Nana go on with her life after high school. He constantly struggles to hold himself back, when Nana willing gives up herself for their "Breathers". Initially, he holds intensely dark desires to dominate Nana, which he holds back for a while, but eventually realizes he does not want to hurt her, and merely loves her and wants her to love him back. He decides to step up and begins to improve himself, in the hopes that he will be able to stand alongside Nana one day. Their relationship further develops in the spin-off, "Black Label". In the live-action film he is portrayed by Rakuto Tochihara. In the original video animation, he is voiced by Junji Majima.
Mitsuko Tachibana
Tachibana runs the S&M store that Kaoru frequents. She has vast knowledge of S&M and also teaches Nana about various things involved in the lifestyle. Little is said about Tachibana in the main series, save that she has in-depth knowledge about the workings of S&M; however, in the spin off "Black Label" more is revealed; She is lovers with the much-older, erotic novelist, Shuutarou Sarashina. While she loves him dearly, she fears if he might leave her, so she does anything she can to make herself his "perfect woman", in a sense, binding him to her. However, she and Sarashina eventually come to terms with each other and they truly admit the love they hold for each other. She majored in Japanese history at Todai, studying culture and customs since the Meiji period, where she first discovered S&M, in forms of torture. She even went to graduate school.
Ryoko Tachi
A girl Kaoru meets one day while he is on one of his early morning stamina building runs. Kaoru mistakes her for a boy until she mentions participating in a heptathlon. Annoyed at the misunderstanding and/or her lack of an obvious chest, she shows him her modest cleavage as proof of her gender. After learning of Kaoru's secret hobby, she develops an interest herself and tries to have Kaoru involve her in some of the activities. Unlike most characters, she seems to be able to switch from being a submissive to a dominant, but is clearly more appreciative of her submissive side. As chapters goes by, she ends loving Kaoru, but she is aware that Kaoru will never see her in the same way as Nana, and she seems to be fine with that, even helping Nana when needed. Nana at first saw Tachi as her love and M rival, but after some time, she became one of her closest friends.
Shuutarou Sarashina
An erotic novelist; while mentioned several times in the original series, he never appears in it. Mostly, his books are only referenced by Kaoru, in an attempt to better act as a dominant or in order to learn certain acts of S&M. He makes his official appearance in the Spin-off, Black Label, where he meets Kaoru by accident and invites him to help on his latest book. He and Mitsuko are lovers; Having met when Mitsuko was a college student. They bonded through S&M, but the years have taken a toll on them, and twisted their feeling for each other from love, into a darker obscure feeling of possession. However, with Nana and Kaoru's help, they both eventually come to terms with their feelings and truly admit their love for each other.

== Media ==
=== Manga ===
Written and illustrated by Ryuta Amazume, Nana & Kaoru was serialized in Hakusensha's seinen manga magazine Young Animal Arashi from January 4, 2008, to October 2, 2009. It was later transferred to Young Animal, where it was serialized from October 23, 2009, until its conclusion on August 12, 2016. Hakusensha collected its chapters in eighteen tankōbon volumes, released from November 28, 2008, to October 28, 2016.

In November 2021, it was announced that Fakku and Denpa would publish the manga in a 3-in-1 omnibus edition.

==== Other series ====
Nana & Kaoru: Black Label, set eight months after the events of the main series, was first launched as an extra edition to the main series in Young Animal Arashi on July 2, 2010, and finished on April 4, 2014. Its chapters were collected by Hakusensha in five volumes, released from June 29, 2011, to July 29, 2014. Fakku licensed the manga in English and the first volume was released on September 2, 2025.

A yonkoma spin-off by Tamami Momose, titled Nana Kao Pink Pure (ナナカオ ぴんくぴゅあ, Nana Kao Pinku Pyua), was serialized in Young Animal Arashi from October 7, 2011, to November 1, 2013. A collected volume was released on January 29, 2014.

Another series, Nana & Kaoru: Last Year, serialized as Nana to Kaoru: Kōkōsei no SM Gokko (ナナとカオル 〜高校生のSMごっこ〜; lit. 'Nana and Kaoru: High Schoolers' S&M Make-Believe'), was published in Hakusensha's digital erotic magazine Harem from November 29, 2018, to October 29, 2021. Hakusensha collects the chapters into individual tankōbon volumes. The first volume was released on July 29, 2019. The fifth and last volume was released on December 24, 2021. Fakku also licensed the manga in English, with the first volume being scheduled for released on September 18, 2026.

==== Volumes ====
===== Nana & Kaoru =====
====== Japanese edition ======
No.	Japanese release date	Japanese ISBN
1	November 28, 2008	978-4-59-214561-5
2	May 29, 2009	978-4-59-214562-2
3	January 29, 2010	978-4-59-214563-9
4	May 28, 2010	978-4-59-214564-6
5	October 29, 2010	978-4-59-214565-3
6	March 29, 2011	978-4-59-214566-0
7	October 28, 2011	978-4-59-214567-7; 978-4-59-214667-4 (LE)
8	April 27, 2012	978-4-59-214568-4
9	September 28, 2012	978-4-59-214569-1
10	April 26, 2013	978-4-59-214570-7; 978-4-59-214669-8 (LE)
11	July 29, 2013	978-4-59-214676-6
12	January 29, 2014	978-4-59-214677-3
13	August 29, 2014	978-4-59-214678-0
14	December 26, 2014	978-4-59-214679-7
15	April 28, 2015	978-4-59-214680-3
16	December 25, 2015	978-4-59-214684-1
17	April 28, 2016	978-4-59-214685-8
18	October 28, 2016	978-4-59-214689-6

====== North American edition ======
No.	English release date	English ISBN
1	October 25, 2022	978-1-63442-343-4
2	March 7, 2023	978-1-63442-377-9
3	September 19, 2023	978-1-63442-399-1
4	February 27, 2024	978-1-63442-433-2
5	August 27, 2024	978-1-63442-434-9
6	July 8, 2025	978-1-63442-460-8

===== Nana & Kaoru: Black Label =====
No.	Original release date	Original ISBN	English release date	English ISBN
1	June 29, 2011	978-4-59-214691-9; 978-4-59-281011-7 (LE)	September 2, 2025	978-1-63442-529-2
2	May 29, 2012	978-4-59-214692-6; 978-4-59-281012-4 (LE)	November 25, 2025	978-1-63442-531-5
3	February 28, 2013	978-4-59-214693-3; 978-4-59-281013-1 (LE)	January 27, 2026	978-1-63442-553-7
4	December 27, 2013	978-4-59-214694-0; 978-4-59-281014-8 (LE)	May 26, 2026	978-1-63442-555-1
5	July 29, 2014	978-4-59-214695-7; 978-4-59-281015-5 (LE)	July 14, 2026	978-1-63442-573-5

===== Nana & Kaoru: Last Year =====
No.	Original release date	Original ISBN	English release date	English ISBN
1	July 29, 2019	978-4-59-216351-0	September 8, 2026	978-1-63442-601-5
2	November 29, 2019	978-4-59-216352-7	December 8, 2026	978-1-63442-603-9
3	July 29, 2020	978-4-59-216353-4	—	—
4	March 29, 2021	978-4-59-216354-1	—	—
5	December 24, 2021	978-4-59-216355-8	—	—

=== Live action films ===
Two youth romance erotic films based on the manga were released, both directed by Atsushi Shimizu. The first, on March 19, 2011, and the second, Nana & Kaoru: Chapter 2 (ナナとカオル 第２章), on September 8, 2012.

=== Anime ===
An original video animation produced by AIC PLUS+, directed by Hideki Okamoto and with character designs by Atsuko Watanabe was released on March 29, 2011.

== Reception ==
Volume 3 reached the 30th place on the weekly Oricon manga chart and, as of January 31, 2010, has sold 25,008 copies; volume 5 reached th 22nd place and, as of October 31, 2010, has sold 34,146 copies; volume 6 reached the 15th place and, as of April 3, 2011, has sold 34,792 copies; Nana & Kaoru: Black Label volume 1 reached the 23rd place and, as of July 3, 2011, has sold 33,619 copies; Nana & Kaoru: Black Label volume 2 reached the 28th place and, as of June 3, 2012, has sold 21,655 copies; volume 9 reached the 24th place and, as of October 7, 2012, has sold 55,005 copies; Nana & Kaoru: Black Label volume 3 reached the 46th place and, as of March 2, 2013, has sold 18,741 copies; volume 11 reached the 22nd place and, as of August 4, 2013, has sold 40,873 copies.

Jean-Karlo Lemus from Anime News Network praised the first volume of the series, and described it as "While the story might have been off to a bumpy start, Nana & Kaoru sets up an enjoyable continuation. Nothing to do but lick our lips as we wait for the second volume. Denpa knows how to keep a fan waiting. Lovely art, fantastic details, Nana and Kaoru are a perfect leading couple, They Really Do Love Each Other, tons of actual research into BDSM philosophy".
