= Fakku =

American adult entertainment company

Fakku, LLC
- Website type: Hentai manga publishing
- Available in: English
- Owners: Jacob Grady (Founder, CEO)
- Parent: Tenkai Archived 2026-01-25 at the Wayback Machine
- Website: www.fakku.net
- Commercial: Yes
- Launched: 2006; 20 years ago
- Current status: Active

Fakku, LLC (styled as FAKKU!, or simply F!, from the Japanese loanword for fuck: ファック) is the largest English-language hentai manga publisher in the world.

Fakku was originally an aggregator that provided users with scanlations of adult manga and dōjinshi from Japan. At the start, the content was uploaded exclusively by the site's administrators, but later these privileges were shared with the community, allowing for translators to have their work seen by a much larger audience. However, at the end of 2015, Fakku made the transition into only publishing officially-licensed hentai manga.

== History ==
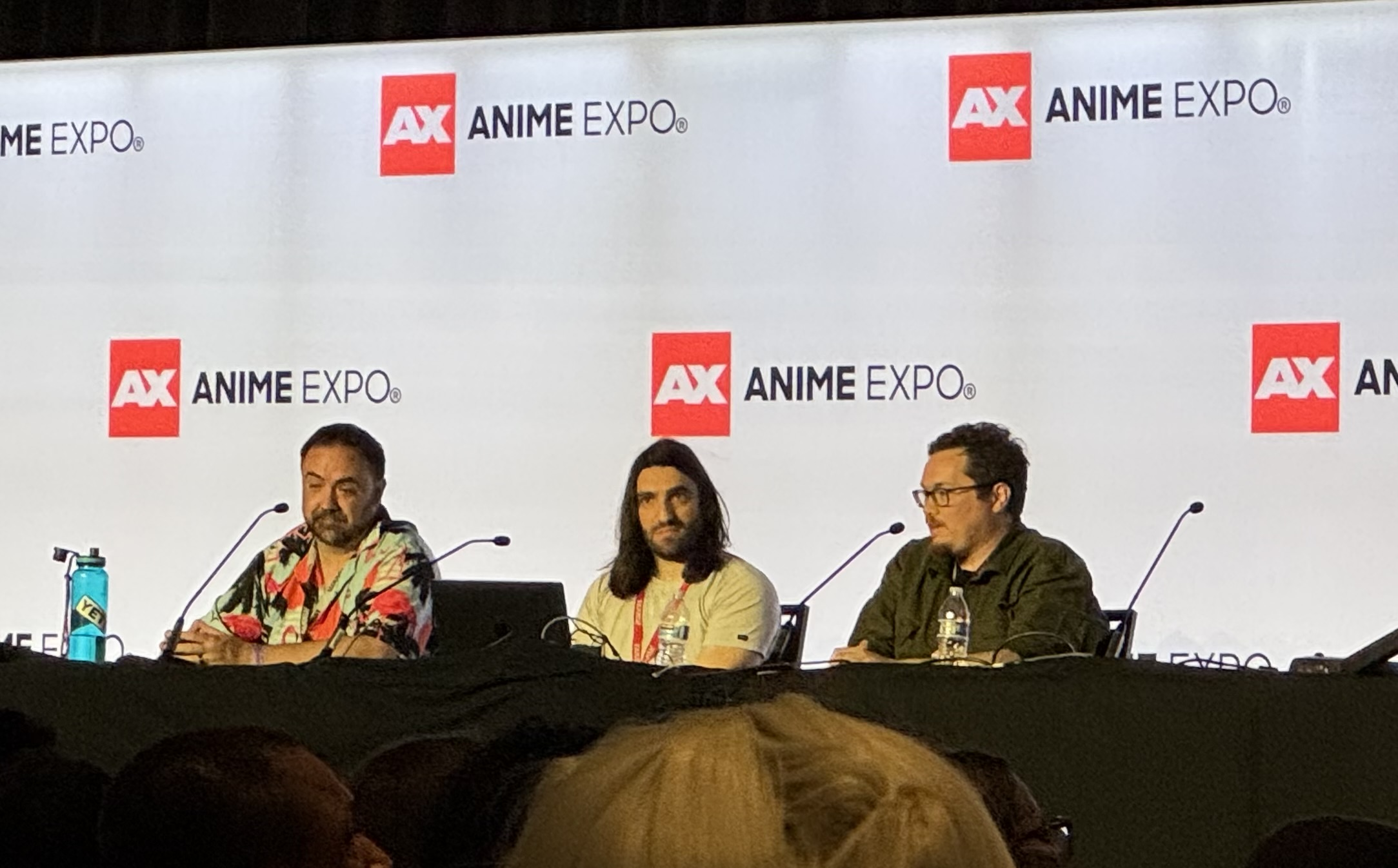
Fakku founder Jacob Grady (center) hosting the company's Anime Expo panel in 2026

Fakku was created in December 2006 by Jacob Grady while he was studying Computer Science in Massachusetts. Fakku was developed under the codename "AAH" or "All About Hentai" (which later became the site's subtitle). Jacob originally used money from student loans to pay for server and bandwidth costs, but that quickly became unsustainable and shortly after its launch Fakku was forced to shut down. It was brought back up after user donations rescued the site in July 2007.

As of July 2011 Fakku entered into a streaming licensing deal with Kitty Media, a subsidiary of Media Blasters. The deal allows Fakku to stream select anime titles at its discretion, starting with Immoral Sisters. Both the subtitled and dubbed editions of Immoral Sisters were made available to users of Fakku at no charge.

On June 19, 2014, Fakku announced that it had entered into a partnership with Wanimagazine to publish its entire catalog of hentai manga in English. This was the start of their transition into a publisher of only legally-licensed content; by the end of 2015, Fakku had removed all unlicensed scanlations from the site.

On December 11, 2015, Fakku announced plans to run a Kickstarter campaign to publish a remastered version of Toshio Maeda's Urotsukidōji: Legend of the Overfiend manga in English. The Kickstarter was to be the first step of a plan to publish all of Maeda's work in English, with La Blue Girl, Demon Beast Invasion, and Adventure Kid to come next. The Kickstarter launched on June 19, 2016, and concluded on July 19, 2016, having met its goal.

On July 7, 2016, Fakku announced the acquisition of Shintaro Kago's ero guro manga Koi no Choujikuuhou and Arisa Yamamoto's non-hentai manga Aiko no Ma-chan.

On July 3, 2017, Fakku announced the addition of three magazines to the service: Girls forM, Comic Bavel, and Comic Europa.

On November 27, 2017, Fakku announced the acquisition of Kitty Media.

In December 2018, hentai streaming and fansubbing website Hentai Haven closed down but announced that they had partnered with Fakku to re-establish the site. On May 11, 2019, Hentai Haven's website started a countdown to when it would start back up, and re-activated starting on May 12, 2019.

On July 6, 2019, Fakku announced the addition of four magazines to the service: Dascomi (successor to Comic Europa), Comic Aoha (successor to Comic Koh), Comic Happining, and Weekly Kairakuten.

On July 7, 2019, PapaHH—the founder of Hentai Haven—posted a message on the home page of the website, claiming that "Fakku ha[d] completely taken over and booted [him] out." It was announced a day later that Grady and PapaHH had settled the issue in private, and the website was put back online. On July 12, 2019, PapaHH explained that the "whole situation played out over a misunderstanding" and that Hentai Haven would "continue as an independent entity, with Fakku helping [them] achieve [their] goal of legitimacy."

On April 1, 2021, Fakku announced Fakku Audio, a "hands-free hentai experience" featuring the voices of several YouTube personalities, which was later revealed to be an April Fool's Day prank.

On August 31, 2021, the Fakku online store that was hosted by a third party provider went down, and was unable to take digital and physical orders. Digital purchases were made available again on October 8, 2021.

On April 24, 2023, the Fakku Team announced that the Fakku Unlimited subscription price would increase for the first time since 2015 on May 24, 2023. Users with an active subscription are not affected by the price change while their subscription remains active, but new or returning subscribers will now pay $14.95 monthly instead of $12.95. In the same announcement, they revealed that they had published over 150 000 pages of new content since the launch of their subscription service.

On May 5, 2023, the addition of Comic Gunjoh (successor to Comic Aoha) was announced.

On July 7, 2026, the addition of Comic Penguin Club was announced.

== Divisions ==
=== FAKKU ===
A list of upcoming titles and older titles selected for reprinting can be found on the following dedicated forum post:

==== Published books ====
Title	Author	Publication Date	ISBN (Paperback)	Ref.
Renai Sample	Homunculus	September 26, 2014	ISBN 978-1-63442-000-6	
PuniKano	Pyon-Kti	October 24, 2014	ISBN 978-1-63442-004-4	
Alluring Woman	Cuvie	December 1, 2014	ISBN 978-1-63442-010-5	
Peachy-Butt Girls	Bosshi	December 1, 2014	ISBN 978-1-63442-007-5	
Welcome to Tokoharu Apartments	Kisaragi Gunma	December 1, 2014	ISBN 978-1-63442-003-7	
Porno Switch	Hisasi	March 17, 2015	ISBN 978-1-63442-011-2	
Hanafuda	Okama	April 16, 2015	ISBN 978-1-63442-138-6	
Love-Ridden	NaPaTa	May 29, 2015	ISBN 978-1-63442-013-6	
Melty Gaze	Hyocorou	July 1, 2015	ISBN 978-1-63442-015-0	
TiTiKEi	ISHiKEi	July 30, 2015	ISBN 978-1-63442-002-0	
Fresh Pudding	Isao	August 20, 2015	ISBN 978-1-63442-017-4	
The Job of a Service Committee Member	Kiyoshiro Inoue	September 10, 2015	ISBN 978-1-63442-023-5	
XXX Maiden	MEME50	October 1, 2015	ISBN 978-1-63442-024-2	
Carnal Communication	mogg	October 22, 2015	ISBN 978-1-63442-020-4	
Curiosity XXXed the Cat	F4U	November 12, 2015	ISBN 978-1-63442-028-0	
Shoujo Material	Hanaharu Naruco	December 1, 2015	ISBN 978-1-63442-026-6	
A Body for Play	Bosshi	December 17, 2015	ISBN 978-1-63442-030-3	
Kira Kira	Hamao	January 21, 2016	ISBN 978-1-63442-032-7	
Meaty Minxes	BoBoBo	February 18, 2016	ISBN 978-1-63442-034-1	
Ima♡Real	Takeda Hiromitsu	March 10, 2016	ISBN 978-1-63442-036-5	
Pandemonium	NaPaTa	March 24, 2016	ISBN 978-1-63442-038-9	
It's a Straight Line Once You Fall in Love	Kisaragi Gunma	April 14, 2016	ISBN 978-1-63442-040-2	
After School Vanilla	Key	May 12, 2016	ISBN 978-1-63442-042-6	
Let's Do It	saitom	June 2, 2016	ISBN 978-1-63442-044-0	
Kogals, Sluts, and Whatever.	Gujira	July 7, 2016	ISBN 978-1-63442-046-4	
Heat Alert	MEME50	August 4, 2016	ISBN 978-1-63442-048-8	
A Healthy Appetite	Sugaishi	October 6, 2016	ISBN 978-1-63442-058-7	
Metamorphosis	Shindo L	October 27, 2016	ISBN 978-1-63442-060-0	
Legend of the Overfiend - Volume 1	Toshio Maeda	November 17, 2016	ISBN 978-1-63442-050-1	
Non Virgin	Oda Non	November 17, 2016	ISBN 978-1-63442-056-3	
Let Loose with Lewd Boobs!	Mojarin	December 1, 2016	ISBN 978-1-63442-053-2	
Bashful Break	Homunculus	December 29, 2016	ISBN 978-1-63442-054-9	
Ecchi Sketch!	Leopard	February 9, 2017	ISBN 978-1-63442-065-5	
Super Dimensional Love Gun	Shintaro Kago	March 9, 2017	ISBN 978-1-63442-063-1	
Excursion Day 99	F4U	March 30, 2017	ISBN 978-1-63442-066-2	
Summer Love Geek Girl	Yurikawa	April 20, 2017	ISBN 978-1-63442-069-3	
Misdirection	Higenamuchi	May 11, 2017	ISBN 978-1-63442-069-3	
Melty Maiden	Toroshio	June 1, 2017	ISBN 978-1-63442-075-4	
The Double Secret	Kojima Miu	June 22, 2017	ISBN 978-1-63442-077-8	
Honey Pot Style	E-Musu Aki	July 13, 2017	ISBN 978-1-63442-079-2	
Legend of the Overfiend - Volume 2	Toshio Maeda	July 19, 2017	ISBN 978-1-63442-081-5	
Legend of the Overfiend - Volume 3	Toshio Maeda	July 19, 2017	ISBN 978-1-63442-094-5	
Let Your Smile Bloom	Akinosora	August 8, 2017	ISBN 978-1-63442-082-2	
T.S. I Love You	The Amanoja9	August 24, 2017	ISBN 978-1-63442-084-6	
School Love Net	Koume Keito	September 14, 2017	ISBN 978-1-63442-086-0	
Whispers After Class	Hinasaki Yo	October 5, 2017	ISBN 978-1-63442-089-1	
Does This Strange Body Please You?	Z-Ton	October 26, 2017	ISBN 978-1-63442-090-7	
Wild At School!	Bota Mochito	November 16, 2017	ISBN 978-1-63442-092-1	
Boobies & Twitchy Sticky Weenies	Kito Sakeru	December 14, 2017	ISBN 978-1-63442-098-3	
Legend of the Overfiend - Volume 4	Toshio Maeda	December 15, 2017	ISBN 978-1-63442-096-9	
Shady Dealings	gy	January 4, 2018	ISBN 978-1-63442-100-3	
Drawn by Brush	MEME50	January 11, 2018	ISBN 978-1-63442-102-7	
Lust Mix	Itou Eight	January 25, 2018	ISBN 978-1-63442-104-1	
Futabu! Mix	Bosshi	February 8, 2018	ISBN 978-1-63442-108-9	
Deep Blue Static	Key	February 22, 2018	ISBN 978-1-63442-110-2	
Melty Lover	Savan	March 8, 2018	ISBN 978-1-63442-112-6	
Gimme That Semen!	Doumou	April 5, 2018	ISBN 978-1-63442-117-1	
Shameless	utu	April 19, 2018	ISBN 978-1-63442-115-7	
Love Me Tender	Fujimaru	May 3, 2018	ISBN 978-1-63442-119-5	
You'll Be Crazy About Me!	Akitsuki Itsuki	May 24, 2018	ISBN 978-1-63442-121-8	
Cherry & GALs ↑↑	Marui Maru	June 7, 2018	ISBN 978-1-63442-123-2	
Darling, You Drive Me Mad…	Esuke	June 21, 2018	ISBN 978-1-63442-125-6	
Every Girl Has Her Thorns	Hisasi	July 12, 2018	ISBN 978-1-63442-127-0	
Monster Smash	Mizone	July 26, 2018	ISBN 978-1-63442-129-4	
Intimate Days	Ikuhana Niiro	August 9, 2018	ISBN 978-1-63442-131-7	
Flappy! Sugar Babies	momi	August 23, 2018	ISBN 978-1-63442-133-1	
Fanaticism	Siokonbu	September 6, 2018	ISBN 978-1-63442-135-5	
The Katsura Family's Daily Sex Life	Higenamuchi	September 20, 2018	ISBN 978-1-63442-140-9	
S&M Ecstasy	Michiking	October 18, 2018	ISBN 978-1-63442-142-3	
Grand Hotel Life	sumiya	November 1, 2018	ISBN 978-1-63442-144-7	
Tittylating!	Okumoto Yuta	November 15, 2018	ISBN 978-1-63442-149-2	
Special Days	Shibasaki Shouji	December 6, 2018	ISBN 978-1-63442-151-5	
Indecent Proposal	Minato Fumi	December 20, 2018	ISBN 978-1-63442-153-9	
Witchcraft	Yamatogawa	January 17, 2019	ISBN 978-1-63442-157-7	
Prince of the Female Otaku Club ☆	MGMEE	January 31, 2019	ISBN 978-1-63442-160-7	
Love Style	Konchiki	February 14, 2019	ISBN 978-1-63442-162-1	
My Bride Is the Demon Lord!?	Nanase Mizuho	February 28, 2019	ISBN 978-1-63442-165-2	
The Otaku in 10,000 B.C. - Volume 1	Nagashima Chousuke	March 14, 2019	ISBN 978-1-63442-163-8	
The Pollinic Girls Attack!	Koume Keito	March 28, 2019	ISBN 978-1-63442-167-6	
Lickety-Slit	Yahiro Pochi	April 11, 2019	ISBN 978-1-63442-175-1	
Pandra	Erect Sawaru	April 25, 2019	ISBN 978-1-63442-177-5	
Milkyway ~ISHiKEi Artworks~	ISHiKEi	April 25, 2019	ISBN 978-1-63442-155-3	
Makeup For You	Thomas	May 9, 2019	ISBN 978-1-63442-180-5	
You're All Mine	NaPaTa	May 30, 2019	ISBN 978-1-63442-183-6	
Power Play!	Yamatogawa	June 13, 2019	ISBN 978-1-63442-181-2	
Courting Étranger	Homunculus	July 11, 2019	ISBN 978-1-63442-185-0	
Lovely	Kyockcho	July 25, 2019	ISBN 978-1-63442-187-4	
Fresh Meat	BoBoBo	August 1, 2019	ISBN 978-1-63442-189-8	
Bullied ~Revenge Hypnosis~	Aiue Oka	August 29, 2019	ISBN 978-1-63442-194-2	
The Otaku in 10,000 B.C. - Volume 2	Nagashima Chousuke	September 12, 2019	ISBN 978-1-63442-196-6	
Limit Break!	MEME50	September 26, 2019	ISBN 978-1-63442-204-8	
Frisky Fever	Nekomata Naomi	October 17, 2019	ISBN 978-1-63442-206-2	
How to Conquer Monster Girls	Mizone	October 31, 2019	ISBN 978-1-63442-208-6	
Mogudan Illust Works	Mogudan	November 14, 2019	ISBN 978-1-63442-202-4	
Black Tights	Various	November 29, 2019	ISBN 978-1-63442-198-0	
Black Tights Deep	Various	November 29, 2019	ISBN 978-1-63442-200-0	
Another's Wife	Karma Tatsuro	December 5, 2019	ISBN 978-1-63442-219-2	
A Fragrance Called Love	Aduma Ren	December 19, 2019	ISBN 978-1-63442-221-5	
Half-Ripe Cherry	utu	January 9, 2020	ISBN 978-1-63442-223-9	
Tits! Tits! Tits!	Okumoto Yuta	January 23, 2020	ISBN 978-1-63442-225-3	
Dirty Docking!	Butcha-U	February 20, 2020	ISBN 978-1-63442-229-1	
Creamy Triumph!	kakao	March 5, 2020	ISBN 978-1-63442-231-4	
Maidens of Steel	Asaki Takayuki	March 26, 2020	ISBN 978-1-63442-237-6	
Vanilla Essence	Yamatogawa	April 2, 2020	ISBN 978-1-63442-239-0	
Your Song	Fujimaru	April 16, 2020	ISBN 978-1-63442-241-3	
twin Milf Vol 1	Tatsunami Youtoku	April 30, 2020	ISBN 978-1-63442-243-7	
I'm Rather… Fond of You.	Hishigata Tomaru	May 14, 2020	ISBN 978-1-63442-245-1	
Girl's Shock	Inu	May 28, 2020	ISBN 978-1-63442-247-5	
Thicker Than Water	gy	June 11, 2020	ISBN 978-1-63442-249-9	
The Otaku in 10,000 B.C. - Volume 3	Nagashima Chousuke	June 25, 2020	ISBN 978-1-63442-255-0	
The Pink Album	Shindo L	July 16, 2020	ISBN 978-1-63442-259-8	
Slutty Life	Satsuki Imonet	July 30, 2020	ISBN 978-1-63442-261-1	
The Swim Club Succubi	Bosshi	August 13, 2020	ISBN 978-1-63442-263-5	
Netorare New Heroine	Kon-Kit	August 27, 2020	ISBN 978-1-63442-265-9	
Let's Get Horny	MEME50	September 10, 2020	ISBN 978-1-63442-267-3	
Tayu Tayu	Yamatogawa	September 24, 2020	ISBN 978-1-63442-269-7	
twin Milf Vol 2	Tatsunami Youtoku	October 8, 2020	ISBN 978-1-63442-271-0	
Monster Romance	Mizone	October 22, 2020	ISBN 978-1-63442-273-4	
I'm Gonna Make You Melt	Rokkaku Yasosuke	November 5, 2020	ISBN 978-1-63442-275-8	
Netoraserare Vol. 1	Konomi Shikishiro	November 19, 2020	ISBN 978-1-63442-277-2	
Sensual Days	Bifidus	December 10, 2020	ISBN 978-1-63442-279-6	
My Lover Is a Vampire!?	Nanase Mizuho	December 17, 2020	ISBN 978-1-63442-282-6	
Holesome Gals!!!	dam	January 7, 2021	ISBN 978-1-63442-284-0	
Viewer Discretion Advised	Iwasaki Yuuki	January 28, 2021	ISBN 978-1-63442-286-4	
Monster Girls With a Need for Seed	Various	February 11, 2021	ISBN 978-1-63442-287-1	
Dreaming Maiden	Aiue Oka	February 25, 2021	ISBN 978-1-63442-293-2	
Pandra II	Erect Sawaru	March 11, 2021	ISBN 978-1-63442-295-6	
Spread the Peace!	utu	March 25, 2021	ISBN 978-1-63442-297-0	
Flip the Thirst Switch	RegDic	April 8, 2021	ISBN 978-1-63442-299-4	
Azato Making+	Michiking	April 22, 2021	ISBN 978-1-63442-301-4	
Netoraserare Vol. 2	Konomi Shikishiro	May 6, 2021	ISBN 978-1-63442-303-8	
Titty Parade	Okumoto Yuta	May 20, 2021	ISBN 978-1-63442-307-6	
Aqua Bless	Yamatogawa	June 3, 2021	ISBN 978-1-63442-309-0	
Dirty Diaries	Kenji	June 17, 2021	ISBN 978-1-63442-311-3	
Love Sharing ♥	Linda	July 8, 2021	ISBN 978-1-63442-317-5	
TSF Monogatari	Shindo L	July 15, 2021	ISBN 978-1-63442-319-9	
Radical Go-Go Baby!	Bosshi	August 12, 2021	ISBN 978-1-63442-321-2	
Satisfaction Guaranteed	Ashiomi Masato	August 26, 2021	ISBN 978-1-63442-323-6	
Naughty Girlfriend	ReDrop	October 7, 2021	ISBN 978-1-63442-325-0	
Wet & Wild	MEME50	October 21, 2021	ISBN 978-1-63442-327-4	
eRomantic Days	BeNantoka	November 4, 2021	ISBN 978-1-63442-329-8	
Netoraserare Vol. 3	Konomi Shikishiro	November 18, 2021	ISBN 978-1-63442-331-1	
Fun Milking Time ♥	Henkuma	December 2, 2021	ISBN 978-1-63442-345-8	
Luscious Lusty Ladies	Ushinomiya	December 16, 2021	ISBN 978-1-63442-347-2	
The Sexual Demon	flanvia	January 6, 2022	ISBN 978-1-63442-349-6	
Sinful Toys	BoBoBo	January 20, 2022	ISBN 978-1-63442-351-9	
How Good Was I?	Yamatogawa	February 3, 2022	ISBN 978-1-63442-353-3	
Take Me Home	Ouchi Kaeru	February 20, 2022	ISBN 978-1-63442-355-7	
Black Moon Prophecy 1	gy	March 3, 2022	ISBN 978-1-63442-363-2	
Intercourse Inn	Bifidus	March 17, 2022	ISBN 978-1-63442-367-0	
Secret Sex Room	Nico-Pun-Nise	March 31, 2022	ISBN 978-1-63442-369-4	
Interspecies Love 101	Awayume	April 14, 2022	ISBN 978-1-63442-373-1	
Black Tights Wide	Various	April 28, 2022	ISBN 978-1-63442-291-8	
Spring Yearning	Okinaga Umanosuke	April 28, 2022	ISBN 978-1-63442-379-3	
Love Me	Kyockcho	May 12, 2022	ISBN 978-1-63442-381-6	
Working Overtime	Bowcan	May 26, 2022	ISBN 978-1-63442-385-4	
Imperfect Marble	Key	June 9, 2022	ISBN 978-1-63442-387-8	
Otherworldly Maidens: Monster Girls from Another World	Mizone	June 23, 2022	ISBN 978-1-63442-389-2	
Day In, Day Out	Hirune	July 7, 2022	ISBN 978-1-63442-403-5	
Head-To-Head Showdown	Karube Guri	July 21, 2022	ISBN 978-1-63442-405-9	
Monopolize	Dramus	August 4, 2022	ISBN 978-1-63442-407-3	
Hot Honey Ecstasy	Kirekawa	August 18, 2022	ISBN 978-1-63442-411-0	
Bootyholic	Misa Wasabi	September 15, 2022	ISBN 978-1-63442-413-4	
Nana & Kaoru, Vol. 01	Ryuta Amazume	September 29, 2022	ISBN 978-1-63442-343-4	
My Mikage-san	Dr. P	October 13, 2022	ISBN 978-1-63442-415-8	
The Otaku in 2200 A.D. Vol. 1	Nagashima Chousuke	October 27, 2022	ISBN 978-1-63442-415-8	
Viewer Discretion Advised 2: Forbidden Desires	Iwasaki Yuuki	November 10, 2022	ISBN 978-1-63442-419-6	
H Girl	Hisasi	November 24, 2022	ISBN 978-1-63442-397-7	
Fxxk Street Girls	Gujira	December 8, 2022	ISBN 978-1-63442-425-7	
Passionate Porno	BoBoBo	December 22, 2022	ISBN 978-1-63442-427-1	
Sticky Lovers!	Navier Haruka 2T	January 12, 2023	ISBN 978-1-63442429-5	
Nana & Kaoru, Vol. 02	Ryuta Amazume	January 26, 2023	ISBN 978-1-63442-377-9	
Juicy Tits	Kon-Kit	February 9, 2023	ISBN 978-1-63442-401-1	
Cast Aoi	Sanagi Torajirou	February 23, 2023	ISBN 978-1-63442-438-7	
Loads of Love	Kitahara Eiji	March 9, 2023	ISBN 978-1-63442-440-0	
Dreamy Handfuls	TANABE	March 23, 2023	ISBN 978-1-63442-442-4	
My Housemaid Is a Tentacle Monster	gy, Akidearest	April 6, 2023	ISBN 978-1-63442-409-7	
Gal Boss and the Harem Office	Tatsunami Youtoku	May 4, 2023	ISBN 978-1-63442-452-3	
Monster Girl Romantic Circus	GEN	May 18, 2023	ISBN 978-1-63442-444-8	
Titty Press!	Okumoto Yuta	June 1, 2023	ISBN 978-1-63442-454-7	
Nana & Kaoru, Vol. 03	Ryuta Amazume	June 29, 2023	ISBN 978-163442-433-2	
Tight Fit! Welcome to the Hole-in-the-Wall Dwelling	Oohira Sunset	July 20, 2023	ISBN 978-1-63442-465-3	
The Otaku in 2200 A.D. Vol. 2	Nagashima Chousuke	August 3, 2023	ISBN 978-1-63442-467-7	
Sinful Sex	utu	August 17, 2023	ISBN 978-1-63442-469-1	
Loving Blossoms	Fujimaru	September 14, 2023	ISBN 978-1-63442-471-4	
Nana & Kaoru, Vol. 04	Ryuta Amazume	October 26, 2023	ISBN 978-1-63442-433-2	
Black Moon Prophecy 2	gy	November 9, 2023	ISBN 978-1-634424-74-5	
Wife Life	Shinozuka Yuuji	November 23, 2023	ISBN 978-1-63442-476-9	
Nana & Kaoru, Vol. 05	Ryuta Amazume	January 30, 2024	ISBN 978-1-63442-434-9	
Sweet Hole	Henkuma	February 15, 2024	ISBN 978-1-63442-495-0	
Feelin' Good! Magical Sluts	Fujimoto Ikura	February 22, 2024		
The Otaku in 2200 A.D. Vol. 3	Nagashima Chousuke	February 29, 2024		
Strange Goddesses	Karasu Chan	March 14, 2024	ISBN 978-1-63442-499-8	
Chitose	Seto Yuki	March 21, 2024	ISBN 978-1-63442-511-7	
POOTERS: All You Can Sex	Butcha-U	April 11, 2024	ISBN 978-1-63442-512-4	
Working You Hard	RegDic	April 25, 2024	ISBN 978-1-63442-516-2	
Sex Spree Saga: Isekai Sex Life Chronicle	Croriin	May 9, 2024	ISBN 978-1-63442-518-6	
Nana & Kaoru, Vol. 06	Ryuta Amazume	May 23, 2024	ISBN 978-1-63442-460-8	
All I Did Was Wear My Skirt Short	dam	June 6, 2024	ISBN 978-1-63442-521-6	
Streets Alive with the Sound of Moaning	Iwami Yasoya	June 20, 2024	ISBN 978-1-63442-524-7	
Love Lariat!	kakao	July 4, 2024		
Jackpot!?	Oosaki	August 1, 2024		
Fleeting Beauties	utu	August 15, 2024		
Horny Virgin	Dojirou	August 29, 2024	ISBN 978-1-63442-537-7	
Love Laid Bare	Ouchi Kaeru	September 26, 2024		
Fantastic Monster Marriage	GEN	October 24, 2024		
Nana and Kaoru Black Label, Vol. 01	Ryuta Amazume	November 27, 2024	ISBN 978-1-63442-529-2	
Succubi Ally!	Fue	December 19, 2024	ISBN 978-1-63442-544-5	
Fuzzy Lips	Inu	January 2, 2025		
Kanente-san & Oonawa-kun	Ash Yokoshima	January 23, 2025		
Ero World	Eroi-Roe	March 6, 2025		
Hip Paradise	Ashiomi Masato	April 3, 2025		
Dreaming Maiden Complete Edition	Aiue Oka	April 17, 2025		
Titty Generation	Okumoto Yuta	May 15, 2025		
Overflow!	Tamabon	May 29, 2025		
Miaku Chiru-sensei's Allure	Wantan Meo	June 12, 2025		
Pantyhose Secrets	Tachiroku	June 26, 2025		
Yummy Tummy	mignon	July 3, 2025	ISBN 978-1-63442-527-8	
The Victim Girls R: Tetralogy	Asanagi	July 31, 2025	ISBN 978-1-63442-557-5	
Nana and Kaoru Black Label, Vol. 02	Ryuta Amazume	August 14, 2025	ISBN 978-1-63442-531-5	
Sex Spree Saga 2: Interspecies Mating	Croriin	August 28, 2025		

Fakku additionally distributes a few books published by Denpa Books, J-Novel Club, 2D Market, and Full Moon:

Title	Author	Publish Date	Ref.
Melting Lover	Bukuro Yamada	June 30, 2019	
Can an Otaku Like Me Really Be an Idol!?	Wacoco Waco	July 11, 2019	
When Budding Lilies Blossom	syou	February 6, 2020	
Canis: Dear Mr. Rain	ZAKK	August 11, 2020	
Wild, Wild Wildlife	Hyougo Kijima	January 5, 2021	

==== Games ====
Title	Developer	Release Date	Ref.
Honey Select Unlimited	Illusion	March 29, 2018	
Honey Select Unlimited Extend + Studio Neo	Illusion	December 10, 2018	
My Little Sister Can't Possibly Have a Hemorrhoid?!	Lyricbox	May 5, 2019	
LOVE^{3}	Neko Works/Neko Work H	September 25, 2019	
True Love '95	Software House Parsley	December 20, 2019	
Oral Lessons with Chii-chan	Orcsoft	March 12, 2020	
Abaddon: Princess of the Decay	Sakuraprin	October 31, 2020	
Perverse Incentives	Futsugo Shugi	March 24, 2021	
Zero Chastity: A Sultry Summer Holiday	Orcsoft	November 16, 2021	
Iku Iku Succubus	Orcsoft	July 19, 2022	
St. Yariman's Little Black Book ~Complete~	Orcsoft	November 1, 2022	
The Kinky Kitsune and The Tantalizing Tanuki	Orcsoft	April 14, 2023	
Forbidden Ward: Raunchy Recovery Plan	Orcsoft	September 27, 2024	
CrossinG KnighTMarE: A Hymn to the Defiled Holy Maidens	Ki-SofTWarE	April 12, 2024	
St. Yariman's Former Sluts ~Mega MILF Edition~	Orcsoft	December 13, 2024	

Eroge from other publishers (Denpasoft, Jast USA, MediBang, etc.) are distributed as well. On 2026, FAKKU has acquired the rights to publish Japanese Game Publisher Fairytale and their entire catalogue.

=== Kuma ===
On July 1, 2019, Fakku officially launched their imprint Kuma, focusing on LGBTQ+ titles.

=== Anime ===
In 2011, Kitty Media entered a licensing partnership with Fakku to stream select titles, starting with Immoral Sisters. In 2017, Kitty Media was acquired by Fakku for digital distribution while physical distribution will still be maintained by Media Blasters. However, in late 2020, CEO of Fakku Jacob Grady commented in the Fakku official forums that they had indefinitely deprioritized video streaming of Kitty Media adult anime because of distribution and copyright issues, causing some titles to be removed from the site. As of January 2023, the streaming section of the site is disabled and there has been no communication regarding the future of streaming or titles that were previously licensed.

=== Other ===
==== Doujinshi ====
Fakku first released doujinshi at Anime Expo 2015 with an exclusive compilation, Bosshi's XXX MiX. Since then, they have regularly put out more self-published content (both Western and Japanese) and also started distributing works localised by other established publishers such as 2D Market.

==== Merchandising ====
Fakku also sells merchandise through their own store, such as T-shirts, skateboards, plushies, figures, etc. Some items are imported from the Japanese market while others are done specifically in collaboration with renowned artists for their own customers.

==== Music ====
In 2017, Fakku and independent label Zoom Lens teamed up to create a compilation in the form of a 36-page artbook along a vinyl or a CD. "The project focuses on the philosophical narrative of the soul searching for new experiences without judgment, conceptualized by illustrators creating an original piece narrating each song in the album." The cover illustration was drawn by Shintaro Kago.

== See also ==
- Hentai
