= NHentai =

Adult manga website

nHentai
- Website type: Hentai and doujinshi gallery
- Available in: English
- Owner: X Separator LLC
- Website: https://nhentai.net
- Commercial: Yes
- Registration: Optional
- Launched: 26 June 2014
- Current status: Online

nHentai is a website that distributes manga belonging to the hentai genre. This website is estimated to receive 90 million visits per month.

== Company ==
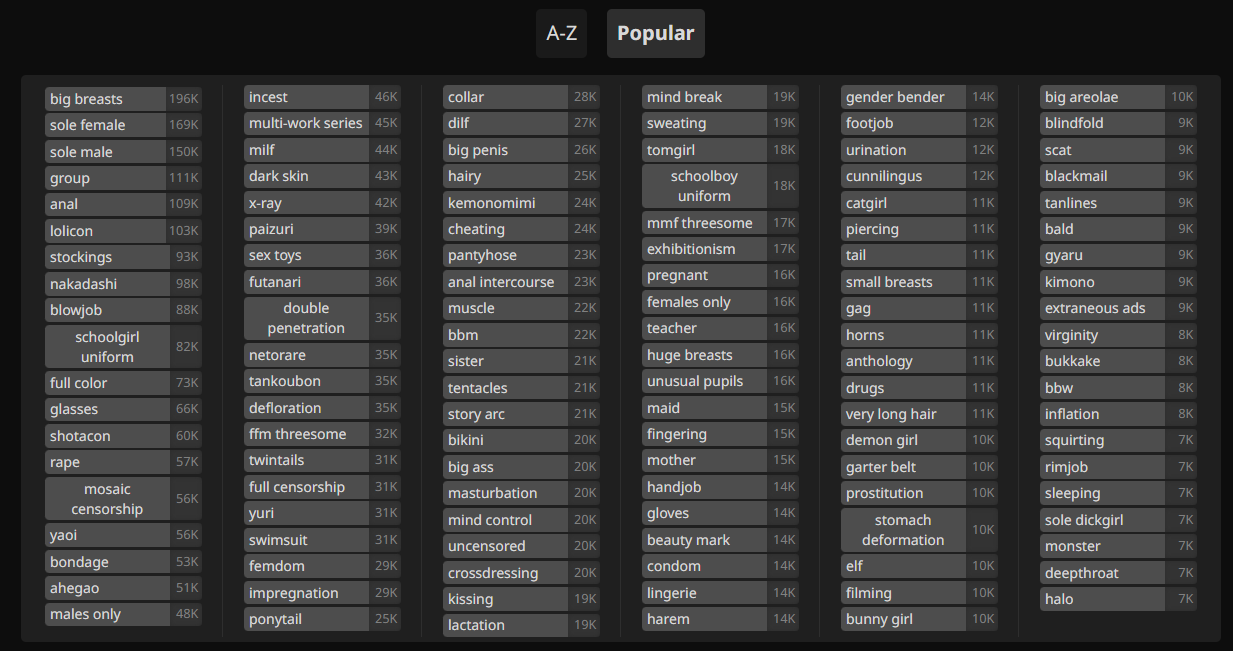
List of tags

nhentai is owned and operated by the Delaware company X Separator LLC. This website is regarded by some rights holders as a site that distributes pirated content and has faced copyright infringement claims from other companies, though it has also filed counterclaims.

== Reception ==
According to Similarweb, nhentai became the 145th most visited website globally in November 2024 and recorded 84 million monthly visits in December. After Japan, the United States accounts for 17.63% of visitors. It is considered the largest hentai piracy site in the United States.

Access to this website is prohibited from certain countries. On 13 December 2024 The State Service of Special Communications and Information Protection of Ukraine added nhentai.net to the list of blocked domains as part of Order No. 972/2777 alongside 13 other domains.

== See also ==
- Fakku
