= Hanaharu Naruko =

Japanese manga artist

Hanaharu Naruko (鳴子ハナハル, Naruko Hanaharu) is a Japanese manga artist, who often works in adult hentai manga.

== Career ==
Naruko's career began in 2002 with the release of his first work, Hitai ("forehead"), in Comic Kairakuten. His first tankōbon collection of hentai manga, Shōjo Material, was published by Wanimagazine on June 30, 2008, and scored a big hit, becoming the highest selling adult manga of 2008.

Naruko also works in other fields. In 2005, he drew the manga adaptation of the popular anime, Kamichu!, which was later translated into French. Naruko is the original character designer for the anime series Gargantia on the Verdurous Planet, A.I.C.O. -Incarnation- and Kandagawa Jet Girls.

His work is characterized by mostly full-colored pages, realistically drawn characters, and vivid backgrounds.

== Works ==
=== Books ===
- Kamichu! ベサメムーチョ（落越友則、舛成孝二、倉田英之の合同ペンネーム）原作。2005年 - 2007年、月刊コミック電撃大王（メディアワークス）連載 全2巻）
- Shōjo Material (2008年、ワニマガジン社 ISBN 978-4-86269-056-2)

=== Comics not collected in books ===
- ネネ（2003年 - 10話まで（連載中断）、COMIC快楽天（ワニマガジン社）連載）
- エレベーターアクション(2004年、COMIC失楽天 12月号)
- クラスメイド(2005年、COMIC快楽天 02月号)
- でこぼこ(2005年、COMIC快楽天 04月号)
- ふたり(2005年、COMIC快楽天 05月号)
- TRYあんぐる(2005年、COMIC快楽天 09月号)
- スーサイドライン(2005年、COMIC失楽天 09月号)
- BOY or CHICKEN? (2006年、COMIC快楽天 02月号)
- ふとんぶ (2006年、COMIC快楽天 06月号)
- はだかの学校 (2006年、COMIC快楽天 10月号)
- クラスメイド マニアックス (2007年、COMIC快楽天 02月号)
- ぱらそる (2007年、COMIC失楽天 09月号)
- りぞらば (2007年、COMIC快楽天 10月号)
- なめねこ (2008年、COMIC快楽天 02月号)
- BiKiNi (2008年、COMIC快楽天 10月号)
