= Comic Kairakuten =

Japanese hentai manga magazine

- Categories: Hentai
- Frequency: Monthly
- Circulation: 350,000 (2010)
- First issue: 1994; 32 years ago
- Company: Wanimagazine
- Country: Japan
- Language: Japanese

Comic Kairakuten (Japanese: COMIC快楽天) is a hentai manga magazine published by Wanimagazine. It is one of the most popular magazines of its type in Japan. The magazine is published online in English by FAKKU.

== Comic ==
The magazine was created in 1994 with work such as that of Range Murata during a trend of changing art styles in anime and manga. Comic Kairakuten's name is a pun of kairaku (快楽, pleasure) and rakuten (楽天, optimism), meaning "pleasure heaven". It limits itself mostly to vanilla content. Comic Kairakuten's publisher, Wanimagazine, has a hard stance towards scanlations of their hentai manga, often taking them down.

Comic Kairakuten is one of the most popular hentai manga magazines in Japan. Between October 2008 and September 2009, there were 350,000 copies in circulation. This was also the case between October 2009 and September 2010.

In January 2017, the online streaming service Komiflo began digital distribution of Kairakuten, the distribution date being the same as the release date of the print magazine. This became the first official digital distribution of Kairakuten.

Beginning with the August 2019 issue, the magazine is now available in bookstores with an adult symbol, following the cessation of adult magazine sales at convenience stores.
