= AI: The Somnium Files – Nirvana Initiative =

2022 video game

AI: The Somnium Files – nirvanA Initiative
- Cover art, featuring Mizuki, Aiba, Ryuki, and Tama
- Developer: Spike Chunsoft
- Publisher: Spike Chunsoft
- Director: Akira Okada
- Producer: Yasuhiro Iizuka
- Designer: Akira Okada
- Artist: Yūsuke Kozaki
- Writer: Kotaro Uchikoshi
- Composer: Keisuke Ito
- Engine: Unity
- Platforms: Nintendo Switch; PlayStation 4; Windows; Xbox One
- Release: JP: June 23, 2022; NA: June 24, 2022; EU/OC: July 8, 2022
- Genres: Adventure, visual novel
- Mode: Single-player

AI: The Somnium Files – Nirvana Initiative (Note: Known in Japan as AI: Somnium File – Nirvana Initiative (AI：ソムニウムファイル ニルヴァーナ イニシアチブ, AI: Somuniumu Fairu Niruvāna Inishiachibu), stylized as nirvanA Initiative) (/aɪ/ EYE) is a 2022 visual novel adventure video game developed and published by Spike Chunsoft. It is a sequel to AI: The Somnium Files (2019) and follows an older Mizuki Date alongside a new playable protagonist Kuruto Ryuki as they investigate the "Half-Body Murders". Gameplay is presented in both visual novel format and third-person exploration for dream investigation sequences.

Writer Kotaro Uchikoshi returns to script the game and reunites with character designer Yūsuke Kozaki, while the first game's designer and assistant director Akira Okada took over as director.

The game was released for the Nintendo Switch, PlayStation 4, Windows, and Xbox One in June 2022 in Japan and North America, and July 2022 in Europe and Oceania.

== Synopsis ==
=== Setting ===
Six years after the events of AI: The Somnium Files, Mizuki Date, the adoptive daughter of Kaname Date, is now an agent of the Advanced Brain Investigation Squad (ABIS). She is assisted by Aiba, an artificial intelligence partner housed in her cybernetic left eye, who previously accompanied Kaname Date. Together they investigate the Half Body serial-killings, a cold case from six years prior, when the case becomes active again. The story also follows the investigation from six years prior, when ABIS agent Kuruto Ryuki and his eyeball partner, Tama, were the lead investigators on the case. Both characters use a process called "Psyncing" to enter the Somnium, or dream world, of persons of interest and extract information to help solve the case.

=== Plot ===
Side: Ryuki

Three months after the New Cyclops Serial Killings were solved by Kaname Date, new ABIS recruit Kuruto Ryuki participates in a live quiz show until it is interrupted with the sudden appearance of half of Jin Furue's corpse, beginning a string of grisly serial murders dubbed the "Half Body" (HB) serial killings committed by a masked figure calling themselves "Tearer". Working together with his AI partner Tama, Ryuki follows the trail of Tearer's killings, eventually learning the existence of an ideological group called Naixatloz that believes in simulation theory and forwards an agenda called the "Nirvana Initiative" which Tearer follows. Date also joins the investigation and has his own theories about Tearer's identity. Soon, geneticist Chikara Horadori, Naixatloz leader Tokiko Shigure, and comedian Andes Komeji are also found cut in half. When Tearer kidnaps Kizuna Chieda, one of Iris Sagan's friends, Ryuki and Date organize a team to go rescue her. However, Kizuna's capture is revealed to be a trap set by Tearer, who tries to coerce Ryuki into killing Date. When Ryuki refuses to follow Tearer's orders, Tearer detonates several bombs, causing the loss of Mizuki's left eye. Date is trapped under rubble and entrusts a broken Aiba to Ryuki before apparently being crushed by more falling rubble. Ryuki subsequently suffers a nervous breakdown after witnessing Date's death.

Side: Mizuki

Six years after the HB serial killings started, Mizuki, now an ABIS investigator, is tipped off that the other half of Jin Furue's body has been discovered in a stadium. Left with many unanswered questions, Mizuki tracks down and interrogates Ryuki, who is now a drunk recluse, haunted with the guilt of failing to stop Tearer. After receiving few answers from him, Mizuki continues her investigations as the second halves of the HB murder victims begin appearing. However, during her investigation, Mizuki meets a mysterious masked woman who reveals that she used to be one of Horadori's test subjects, and Mizuki discovers that both she and Komeji's son Shoma Enda were genetically modified as children, granting Mizuki her superior physical abilities and Shoma near-suspended aging. Mizuki is eventually able to confront Tearer, but is shocked to see that Tearer has coerced Ryuki into being his henchman by holding Tama hostage. Date then arrives and knocks out Tearer, while Ryuki flees. Mizuki takes the opportunity to Psync with Tearer and discovers Tearer is actually Jin himself. Tokiko then arrives and they both reveal the Nirvana Initiative is a plan for them to sow enough chaos in hopes that the simulated world will break down and humanity can truly be free.

True Timeline

Afterwards, bartender Mama addresses the player directly, revealing that both Side: Ryuki and Side: Mizuki were told in nonlinear order.

It's revealed that Jin, Horadori, and Komeji were killed and both halves of their bodies were found six years ago, while Tokiko was killed in the present time. Tearer's true identity is Uru Somezuki, a child kidnapped by Horadori to act as an organ donor for Jin, who is actually Horadori and Tokiko's son. Uru eventually adopted Naixatloz's beliefs and swore to carry out the Nirvana Initiative, starting with the HB murders. The Mizuki who was investigating the murders six years ago was actually Mizuki "Bibi" Kuranushi, an older identical clone of Mizuki Date who was adopted by Boss and working as a secret ABIS agent. Date also returns, having survived the events six years ago but temporarily losing his memories. Mizuki and Bibi team up and continue their investigation, eventually finding out that Komeji's daughter Amame Doi was coerced by Tokiko to assist in carrying out the Nirvana Initiative until Tokiko committed suicide and Amame murdered Uru in revenge for her father's death. However, despite Uru's death, his followers continue carrying out his plan. Ryuki explains that the Nirvana Initiative involves infecting humanity with the TC-PERGE virus, which will cause mass insanity in its victims.

Mizuki and her friends deduce that Uru had hidden a missile containing TC-PERGE in the city stadium, and they head there to battle Uru's remaining followers. As their friends take down Uru's followers, Mizuki and Bibi successfully destroy the missile and TC-PERGE before it can be spread. Afterwards, things in Tokyo begin to return to normal. Mizuki and Bibi investigate Tokiko's office one last time, activating a hologram recording that gives the player a "nil number". Later, the Boss rewards Mizuki and Bibi for solving the HB murders by arranging a musical number at the stadium to dance to.

If the player replays the section six years ago where Ryuki first met Tokiko and gives her the "nil number", the act of Ryuki giving her information he should not have known proves the existence of the player to Tokiko, and she manages to transcend to a different level of existence. Before she leaves, she gives Ryuki all of the knowledge of the events that will happen in the next six years, which he uses to immediately arrest Uru. This prematurely ends the Nirvana Initiative, saves Komeji's life, and improves the lives of all of the main characters, though Mizuki and Bibi retain some memories of the other timeline and question Ryuki about it.

Doing this also unlocks a bonus Somnium which recreates the first escape room from 999: 9 Hours, 9 Persons, 9 Doors with Aiba playing the role of Junpei, the protagonist of 999.

== Reception ==
Reception

Aggregate scores
Aggregator	Score
Metacritic	PC: 88/100; NS: 85/100; PS4: 85/100; XONE: 84/100
OpenCritic	94% recommend

Review scores
Publication	Score
Destructoid	8.5/10
Famitsu	9/10, 9/10, 8/10, 8/10
Hardcore Gamer	4.5/5
Nintendo Life	9/10
Nintendo World Report	7.5/10
PC Gamer (US)	83/100
Push Square	7/10
RPGFan	78/100
TouchArcade	4.5/5

AI: The Somnium Files – nirvanA Initiative received "generally favorable" reviews, according to review aggregator Metacritic. Fellow review aggregator OpenCritic assessed that the game received "mighty" approval, being recommended by 94% of critics.

Hardcore Gamer stated that the game's story succeeded "brilliantly, in every regard", and that the music was "utterly fantastic", concluding, "Much like the original, AI: The Somnium Files – nirvanA Initiative is an innovative take on the genre that must be experienced and is well worth picking up." Nintendo Life wrote in favor of the game's characters, voice acting, premise, and combination of visual novel and puzzle sections but felt that the Switch's Joy-Con were occasionally imprecise. Nintendo World Report praised the Switch version's solid performance in both handheld and docked mode, its presentation of information, and accessibility for both new and returning players alike. However, the site directed criticism towards obtuse point-and-click sequences and limited save slots. Push Square lauded its high-quality voicework, sense of humor, and the engrossing murder mystery while taking minor issue with the cast of characters being inferior to the ones in the previous game. RPGFan thought positively of the well-rounded characters, creative puzzles, and strong story but criticized its repetitive storytelling, rigid structure, unsatisfying ending, and quirky sense of humor.

On the Famitsu sales charts in its first week, the game made positions 20, selling 2,333 copies, and 29, selling 1,319, for a combined total of 3,652 copies in its first week.

== Sequel ==
No Sleep For Kaname Date – From AI: The Somnium Files, a third game in the series, was announced during a Nintendo Direct presentation on March 27, 2025. It was released on the Nintendo Switch and Windows in North America and Europe on July 25, 2025. It is written and directed by Kazuya Yamada, with Uchikoshi credited as the "series director" and "scenario supervisor". Its story is set shortly after the events of the first game, and prior to Nirvana Initiative.
