= Wanimagazine =

Japanese publishing company

Wanimagazine Co., Ltd.
- Founded: September 10, 1971; 55 years ago
- Country of origin: Japan
- Headquarters location: 〒160-8580; Shinjuku, Tokyo
- Publication types: Manga magazines, other magazines
- Official website: www.wani.com

Wanimagazine Co., Ltd. (Japanese: 株式会社ワニマガジン社, Hepburn: Kabushiki Gaisha Wani Magajin-sha) is a Japanese publisher founded on September 10, 1971 and based in Shinjuku, Tokyo which specializes in hentai manga magazines.

== Comic Kairakuten ==
Comic Kairakuten (Japanese: COMIC快楽天), published by WANIMAGAZINE CO., LTD, Is Japan’s biggest selling ero (hentai) manga monthly magazine. First published in Japan in 1995, Comic Kairakuten started as a monthly comic which contained some hentai manga alongside other genres but slowly evolved into a magazine which consisted predominantly of hentai manga.

Comic Kairakuten is currently available to purchase in Japanese convenience stores, and digital versions of the magazine became available in 2014. Comic Kairakuten is published on the 29th of the month unless the 29th is a Sunday or a public holiday, in which case it may be published between the 27th to the 30th of the month.

== Notable Contributors ==
Over the years the magazine featured many famous illustrators and manga artists including LINDA, Keito Koume, Hanaharu Naruco, Napata, Key, Michiking and Homunculus. Many of the early covers were drawn by Murata Range, who still draws a monthly illustration for the magazine in a feature named futuregraph.

== International distribution ==
In 2015, an English language version of Comic Kairakuten and its slightly harder spin off X-EROS began being published outside of Japan by FAKKU, the largest English-language hentai publisher in the world. They were the first monthly eromanga magazines to be officially published in English. The English version is released on the same day as the Japanese original, also making them the first monthly eromanga magazines to be simulpublished in a language other than Japanese.

The Japanese language version of the magazine is currently also available in Hong Kong, Taiwan, Singapore, and Malaysia via the eromanga magazine streaming platform Komiflo.

== Magazines ==
=== Manga ===
- Comic Kairakuten (COMIC快楽天)
- Comic Kairakuten BEAST (COMIC快楽天ビースト, Komikku Kairakuten Bīsuto)
- Comic Shitsurakuten (COMIC失楽天)
- Comic Hana-Man (COMIC華漫)
- Hana-Man Gold (華漫GOLD)
- Comic X-Eros
- Manga Pachislot Fighter (漫画パチスロファイター, Manga Pachisuro Faitā)
- Quarterly Gelatin (季刊GELATIN, Kikan Gelatin; from February 2009 to August 2011)
- Hime (ひめ; since August 2011)
- Wani-Bites (English-language; iBooks; since 2014)

=== Gravure ===
- Chu (Chuッ)
- Chu Special (Chuッ スペシャル, Chu Supesharu)
- Yha! Hip&Lip
