= List of hentai anime =

This is a list of notable hentai anime. Hentai is anime and manga that contains pornographic content.

Title	Director	Released	Studio	Ref.
Adventure Kid (妖獣戦線アドベンチャーKID)	Hideku	1992		
Akiba Girls	JG?	October 24, 2003	Milky; Japan-X	
Alien from the Darkness	Nario Takanami	1996	Pink Pineapple	
Angel		1994		
Angel Blade	Masami Ōbari	December 14, 2001	Studio G-1 Neo Frontline	
Angels in the Court				
Angel of Darkness				
Beat Angel Escalayer				
Bible Black series	Sho Hanebu; Kazuyuki Honda	July 21, 2001	MS pictures	
Boku no Pico series (yaoi)	Katsuyoshi Yatabe	September 7, 2006	Natural high	
Bondage Mansion	Norihiko Nagahama	February 18, 2000	Vanilla	
Campus	Omata Shinichi	November 9, 2000	Vanilla	
Call Me Tonight				
Cool Devices				
Dark Shell				
Demon Beast Invasion				
Dragon Knight series				
Elven Bride				
Enzai: Falsely Accused (Yaoi)				
F³ (Frantic, Frustrated, Female)				
Fencer of Minerva				
Fish in the Trap (Yaoi)				
Futari Ecchi (Step Up Love Story)				
G-Taste				
Girl Next Door				
Green Green: Erolutions				
Harukoi Otome				
Hatsuinu				
I Dream of Mimi				
Imouto Paradise!				
Imouto Paradise 2				
Jiburiru - The Devil Angel				
Kama Sutra				
Kanojo × Kanojo × Kanojo				
Kite				
La Blue Girl series				
Level C (Yaoi)				
Lolita Anime				
Magic Woman M				
Magical Canan				
Magical Twilight				
Maple Colors				
MeiKing				
Mezzo Forte: Director's Cut				
Midnight Panther				
Milk Money				
Mizuiro				
Moonlight Lady				
My Sexual Harassment (Yaoi)				
Mystery of the Necronomicon				
Night Shift Nurses				
No Money (Okane ga nai, Yaoi)				
Ogenki Clinic Adventures				
Papillon Rose				
Prism Ark				
Private Psycho Lesson				
Rei Rei				
Sensitive Pornograph (Yaoi)				
Sexy Sailor Soldiers				
Slave Doll				
Sora no Iro, Mizu no Iro				
Stepmother's Sin				
Steal Moon (Yaoi)				
Taboo Charming Mother	Kan Fukumoto; Shigeki Awai	November 25, 2003	Big Wing	
The Rapeman				
Tournament of the Gods				
Urotsukidoji				
Venus 5				
Vixens				
Welcome to Pia Carrot				
Women at Work				
Words Worth				

== See also ==
- List of hentai authors (groups, studios, productions companies, circles)
