= Shiho Kawaragi =

Japanese voice actress, singer and narrator (born 1976)

- 河原木 志穂
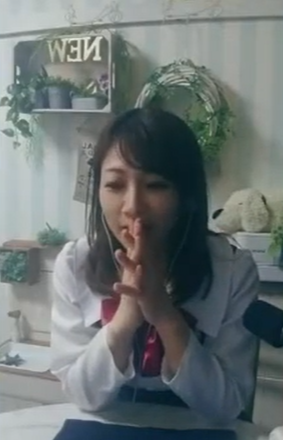
- Kawaragi in 2024
- Born: April 29, 1976 (age 50); Tokyo, Japan
- Other names: Kaname Yuzuki; Yuua Yushizawa
- Occupations: Voice actress; singer; narrator
- Years active: 1990–present
- Agent: Kenyuu Office
- Height: 158 cm (5 ft 2 in)
- Children: 1

Shiho Kawaragi (河原木 志穂, Kawaragi Shiho; born April 29, 1976) is a Japanese voice actress, singer and narrator who works for Kenyuu Office. When voicing adult games and hentai OVAs, she is also known as Kaname Yuzuki (柚木かなめ, Yuzuki Kaname), She is married since March 2012.

== Career ==
She was born in Tokyo and her artistic history is Katsuta Voice actor school, Beniya 25 o'clock, and voicegarage. She joined a unit called Oeser Corps with Yu Urata, Sachi Matsumoto, Kōki Harasawa, Yukiko Takaguchi and Asami Yaguchi who co-starred in the anime Fantastic Children.

Along with Ai Mizuno and Aya Endo, she formed a unit called Plume, which has been working on releasing self-produced CDs, stage and internet radio. On December 8, 2007, the company announced that it had signed with Lantis at a live event.

== Filmography ==
=== Anime ===
- Aki Sora as Aki Aoi
- Law of Ueki as Barou Esharotto
- Ikkitousen: Dragon Destiny as Bunwa Kaku
- Trigger Heart Exelica as Exelica
- Princess Resurrection as Flandre
- Grope: Yami no Naka no Kotoritachi as Fubuki Momose
- Touka Gettan as Fuu
- Manin Densha as Haruka Miwa
- Fantastic Children as Helga
- Izumo: Takeki Tsurugi no Senki as Himiko
- Ane Haramix as Hitomi Takami
- Musashi as Kaguya
- Tenchi Muyo! GXP as Karen
- Kagihime Monogatari Eikyuu Alice Rondo as Kirika Kagarigi
- Koihime†Musō as Kousonsan
- Hoshiuta: Starlight Serenade as Kurara Amamiya
- Hoshiuta as Kurara Amamiya
- Black Lagoon as Maki
- Tenjho Tenge as Mana Kuzunoha
- Rozen Maiden Ouvertüre as Megu Kakizaki
- Rozen Maiden Träumend as Megu Kakizaki
- Immoral as Minami Kawai
- Little Busters! as Mio Nishizono
- Little Busters Ex! as Mio Nishizono
- Shōjo Sect as Momoko Naitou
- Discipline (OVA) as Otokawa Saori
- Assassination Classroom as Rinka Hayami
- Gift ~eternal rainbow~ as Rinka Hokazono
- Ray the Animation as Rumi
- Zettai Shougeki ~Platonic Heart~ as Saki Daimonji
- Oku-sama wa Joshi Kōsei as Satomi Endou
- School Days as Sekai Saionji
- Summer Days as Sekai Saionji
- Hoshizora e Kakaru Hashi as Senka Yorozu
- Majin Tantei Nougami Neuro as Shiho Ezaki
- Kakyuusei 2 as Tamaki Saimon
- Kakyuusei 2: Anthology as Tamaki Saimon
- Iro ni Ide ni Keri Waga Koi wa as Tomone Harukaze
- Imōto Jiru as Yukie Kohinata
- Innocent Blue as Yumi
- Case Closed as Hamaka Oiso
- Kaginado as Mio Nishizono
- Cafe Junkie as Minami Kurumi
- Hitozuma no Kuchibiru wa Kan Chūhai no Aji ga Shite as Yui Koriyama (on-air version)

=== Video games ===
- Yume Miru Kusuri: A Drug That Makes You Dream as Aeka Shiraki
- Tales of Commons as Sefina
- Tales of Graces as Cheria Barnes
- Crash Fever as Ghatanothoa
- Muramasa: The Demon Blade as Yuzuruha
- Fate/Samurai Remnant as Chiemon's Mother
- Genshin Impact as "M"

=== Dubbing ===
==== Voice-double ====
- Alyson Stoner
  - Alice Upside Down (Alice McKinley)
  - Phineas and Ferb (Isabella Garcia-Shapiro)
  - Camp Rock (Caitlyn Gellar)
  - Camp Rock 2: The Final Jam (Caitlyn Gellar)
  - Step Up 3D (Camille Gage)
  - Step Up: All In (Camille Gage)

==== Live-action ====
- Big Nothing (Josie McBroom (Alice Eve))
- Desperate Housewives (Kayla Huffington (Rachel G. Fox))
- Intermezzo (Ann Marie Brandt (Ann Todd))
- Lara Croft: Tomb Raider (Lara Croft (young) (Rachel Appleton))

==== Animation ====
- Hamster & Gretel as Laura / The Destructress
- The Secret of Kells as Aisling

== Staff roles ==
- Kakyuusei 2 (TV) : Theme Song Performance (Katyusha : OP + ED)
- Kakyuusei 2: Anthology (OAV) : Theme Song Performance (Katyusha 2nd: OP+ED)
- Oku-sama wa Joshi Kousei (TV) : Theme Song Performance (ED)
- Rozen Maiden Träumend (TV) : Megu Kakizaki's Theme (Insert)

=== Dubbing roles ===
- The Triplets* Ana
