= 1994 in anime =

The events of 1994 in anime.

== Accolades ==
- Animation Film Award: Pom Poko

== Releases ==
Released	Title	Type	Director	Studio	Ref
	Dragon Pink	OVA series	Takashi Takai, Wataru Fujii	Pink Pineapple	
	F³: Frantic, Frustrated & Female	OVA series	Masakazu Akan	AIC, Pink Pineapple	
January 2	Kageyama Tamio no Double Fantasy	TV special	Katsumi Terahigashi	Shin-Ei Animation	
January 7	Akazukin Chacha	TV series	Hatsuki Tsuji	Gallop	
January 14	Kibun wa Uaa Jitsuzai OL Kōza	Film	Tetsuo Yasumi	Group TAC	
January 16	Tico of the Seven Seas	TV series	Jun Takagi	Nippon Animation	
January 21	Dirty Pair Flash	TV series	Tsukasa Sunaga	Sunrise, Bandai Visual	
January 22	Kattobase! Dreamers —Carp Tanjō Monogatari―	Film	Yoshinori Kanemori	Madhouse	
February 5	Brave Police J-Decker	TV series	Shinji Takamatsu	Sunrise	
February 21	Urotsukidōji III: Return of the Overfiend Director's Edition	Film	Hideki Takayama	West Cape, Team Mu	
March 5	Compiler	OVA series	Kiyoshi Murayama, Takao Kato	Animate Film, Studio Fantasia	
March 12	Doraemon: Nobita's Three Visionary Swordsmen	Film	Tsutomu Shibayama	Shin-Ei Animation	
March 12	Dragon Ball Z: Broly – Second Coming	Film	Shigeyasu Yamauchi	Toei Animation	
March 13	Marmalade Boy	TV series	Akinori Yabe	Toei Animation	
March 19	Sailor Moon S	TV series	Kunihiko Ikuhara	Toei Animation	
March 21	Final Fantasy: Legend of the Crystals	OVA series	Rintaro	Madhouse	
March 21	Plastic Little	OVA	Satoshi Urushihara	KSS	
April 2	Montana Jones	TV series	Tetsuo Imazawa	Studio Junio	
April 5	Haō Taikei Ryū Knight	TV series	Toshifumi Kawase	Sunrise	
April 5	Red Baron	TV series	Akio Sakai	Tōkyō Movie Shinsha	
April 8	Thunder Jet	TV series	Seiji Okuda	Easy Film	
April 9	Yu Yu Hakusho the Movie: Poltergeist Report	Film	Masakatsu Iijima	Studio Pierrot	
April 21	New Cutie Honey	OVA series	Yasuchika Nagaoka	Toei Animation	
April 22	G Gundam	TV series	Yasuhiro Imagawa	Sunrise	
April 23	Crayon Shin-chan: The Secret Treasure of Buri Buri Kingdom	Film	Hiro Yūki	Shin-Ei Animation	
May 21	Dohyō no Oni-tachi	Film	Naoyuki Yoshinaga	Studio Deen	
May 21	Dosukoi! Wanpaku Dohyō	Film	Seijiro Kamiyama	Mook Animation	
May 24	Dengeki Oshioki Musume Gōtaman: Gōtaman Tanjō-hen	OVA	Iku Suzuki	Studio Kikan	
June 11	J League o 100-bai Tanoshiku Miru Hōhō!!	Film	Itsumichi Isomura	Ajia-do Animation Works	
June 23	Iria: Zeiram the Animation	OVA series	Tetsurō Amino	Ashi Productions	
July 8	Magical Twilight	OVA series	Toshiaki Komura	Pink Pineapple	
July 9	Dragon Ball Z: Bio-Broly	Film	Yoshihiro Ueda	Toei Animation	
July 9	Slam Dunk: Conquer the Nation, Hanamichi Sakuragi!	Film	Nobutaka Nishizawa	Toei Animation	
July 9	Sangokushi (dai 3-bu): Harukanaru Taichi	Film	Tomoharu Katsumata	Enoki Films	
July 16	Fatal Fury: The Motion Picture	Film	Masami Ōbari	Studio Wombat, Yumeta Company	
July 16	Pom Poko	Film	Isao Takahata	Studio Ghibli	
July 16	Soreike! Anpanman: Ririkaru Majikaru Mahō no Gakkō	Film	Akinori Nagaoka, Hiroyuki Yano	Tokyo Movie Shinsha	
July 16	The Life of Guskou Budori	Film	Ryutaro Nakamura	Kyōdō Eiga Zenkoku Keiretsu Kaigi	
July 29	Lupin III: Dragon of Doom	TV special	Masaharu Okuwaki	Tokyo Movie Shinsha	
August 6	Street Fighter II: The Animated Movie	Film	Gisaburō Sugii	Group TAC, SEDIC, Sony Music Entertainment	
August 20	Ghost Sweeper Mikami: The Great Paradise Battle!!	Film	Atsutoshi Umezawa	Toei Animation	
August 21	Baki the Grappler	OVA	Yuji Asada	Knack Productions	
August 21	Captain Tsubasa: The Most Powerful Opponent! Holland Youth	OVA	Yoriyasu Kogawa	J.C.Staff	
August 25	Cosmic Fantasy: Galaxy Cougar's Trap	OVA	Kazuhiro Ochi	Tokuma Shoten	
September 8	Samurai Shodown: The Motion Picture	TV film	Hiroshi Ishiodori	Studio Comet	
September 21	I'm Not an Angel	OVA	Hiroko Tokita	Group TAC	
September 24	You're Under Arrest	OVA series	Kazuhiro Furuhashi	Studio Deen	
October 5	Blue Seed	TV series	Jun Kamiya	Production I.G.	
October 7	DNA²	TV series	Jun'ichi Sakata	Madhouse, Studio Deen	
October 8	Darkside Blues	Film	Nobuyasu Furukawa	J.C.Staff	
October 16	Macross 7	TV series	Tetsurō Amino	Studio Nue, Ashi Productions	
October 13	Magical Circle Guru Guru	TV series	Nobuaki Nakanishi	TV Asahi	
October 17	Magic Knight Rayearth	TV series	Toshihiro Hirano	Tōkyō Movie Shinsha	
October 21	Captain Tsubasa J	TV series	Junichi Sato	Studio Comet	
October 24	Dengeki Oshioki Musume Gōtaman R: Ai to Kanashimi no Final Battle	OVA	Hiroshi Yoshida	Studio Kikan	
November 6	Get Going! Godzilland	OVA series	Seinosuke Tanaka & Osamu Nakayama	Gakken Video	
December 4	Sailor Moon S: The Movie	Film	Hiroki Shibata	Toei Animation	
December 16	Key the Metal Idol	OVA series	Hiroaki Satō	Studio Pierrot	

== See also ==
- 1994 in animation
