= List of titles by Pink Pineapple =

Pink Pineapple is an anime production company that specializes in the production of hentai OVAs. It was founded by KSS and is currently owned by Softgarage.

== List of video titles by Pink Pineapple ==
- A Girl in a Lower Grade (Kakyuusei)
  A 13 episode TV series based on the ELF Corporation renai eroge Kakyusei, part of the Nanpa/Dokyusei series.
- Alien from the Darkness
  A 1 episode OVA series
- Angel of Darkness
  A 4 movie OVA series
- Angels In the Court
  A set 2 of OVA series, each comprising 2 OVA episodes. The OVA series is based on an eroge series of the same name
- Anejiru The Animation
  A 2 episode OVA series
- Beat Angel Escalayer
  A 3 episode OVA series based on the eponymous eroge
- Buttobi CPU (I Dream of Mimi)
  A 3 episode OVA series, an ecchi satire of the battle between the NEC PC98 and Apple Macintosh for market dominance in the Japanese home PC market
- Classmates 2 Special: Graduation (Doukyuusei 2 SPECIAL)
  A 3 episode OVA series based on the ELF Corporation renai eroge Dokyusei 2.
- Dragon Knight: The Wheel of Time
  A 3 episode OVA series based on the ELF Corporation eroge RPG Dragon Knight 4
- Elven Bride
  A 2 episode OVA series
- End of Summer
  A set of OVA series based on the ELF Corporation eroge renai game Dokyusei
  - End of Summer 1 (Dōkyūsei)
    A 4 episode OVA series
  - End of Summer 2 (Dōkyūsei 2)
    A 12 episode OVA series
- F³ (Frantic, Frustrated, and Female)
  A 3 episode OVA series
- Hatsu Inu - Strange Kind of Woman - THE ANIMATION
  A 2 episode OVA series
- Heisei Harenchi Gakuen
  A 1 episode OVA series
- Kakyusei series
  A set of OVA series based on the ELF Corporation renai eroge dating sim Kakyusei, part of the Dokyusei series of games
- Magical Twilight
  A 3 episode OVA series
- Mizuiro
  A 2 episode OVA series
- Moonlight Lady
  A 5 episode OVA series
- New Angel
  A 5 episode OVA series based on the hentai manga by U-Jin
- Parade Parade
  A 2 episode OVA series based on the adult manga by Satoshi Akifuji
- Refrain Blue
  A 3 episode OVA series
- Rei Rei - Missionary of Love
  A 2 episode OVA series
- Sweet Seraph Love Mary ~Unholy Conception~ THE ANIMATION
  A 2 episode OVA series based on the hentai manga by Kuuki Satou
- Tournament of the Gods
  A 3 episode OVA series
- Usagi-chan de Cue!!
- Welcome to Pia Carrot!! series
  A set of OVA series based on the series of eroge renai games of the same name, also called Pia Carrot He Youkoso!!
- Yu-No
  A 4 episode OVA series based on the eponymous eroge
- Filling the Hole with an Old Man THE ANIMATION
  A 2 episode OVA series which depicts girls who become addicted to sex with older men in a delicate and intense way.

== See also ==
- Green Bunny
