= Milk Money =

Milk Money may refer to:

- Milk Money (film), a 1994 romantic comedy film
- Milk Money (anime), a 2004 hentai series
- Milk Money (band), an American band
