= Shigenori Kageyama =

Japanese anime director

- Born: July 29, 1955 (age 71); Hirakata, Osaka Japan
- Other name: Yōsei Morino
- Occupation: Animation director

Shigenori Kageyama (影山 楙倫, Kageyama Shigenori; born July 29, 1955) is a Japanese animation director. He is also known under the name Yōsei Morino (杜野 幼青, Morino Yōsei) (meaning "forest fairy" in Japanese).

== Anime involved in ==
=== Under the name Shigenori Kageyama ===
- Acrobunch: Character Design
- Birth: Animation Coordination, Main Animator
- Dōkyūsei 2: Screenplay
- Dynamic Chord: Director, Series Composition, Script (eps. 1–4), Storyboard (eps. 1–12)
- Himawari!: Director
- Himawari!!: Director
- The Humanoid: Editorial Supervisor
- From I"s: Screenplay
- Kakyuusei: Storyboards (ep 3, 7)
- Kakyuusei 2: Screenplay, Series composition
- Kaze no Yojimbo: Storyboards
- Leda: The Fantastic Adventure of Yohko: Animation Coordination, Main Animator
- Mask of Zeguy: Director, Screenplay
- My Clueless First Friend: Director
- Naruto: Storyboard
- Pia Carrot 2 DX: Screenplay
- Plawres Sanshiro: Animation director
- Space Warrior Baldios: Illustration
- Star Musketeer Bismarck: Animation director
- Windaria: Animation Coordination, Key Animation
- Yamato 2520: Episode director (ep. 3), Storyboard

=== Under the name Yōsei Morino ===
- Dōkyūsei 2: Director
- From I"s: Director
- Kakyuusei 2: Director
- Midnight Panther: Director, Screenplay, Storyboard
- My Sexual Harassment: Director
- One: Kagayaku Kisetsu e: Director
- Pia Carrot 2: Screenplay
- Pia Carrot 2 DX: Director
- Queen's Blade Rebellion: Director, Script (ep 12), Storyboard (eps. 1, 3, 5-7, 12), Episode Director
- Romance is in the Flash of the Sword II: Director, Script
- Urotsukidōji IV: Inferno Road: Director
- With You ~Mitsumeteitai~: Director
- Words Worth: Screenplay, Storyboard (ep 3)
- Words Worth: Outer Story: Screenplay, Storyboard
