= KSS (company) =

Defunct Japanese anime studio services company

- Industry: Film, Games
- Founded: c. 1988
- Defunct: 2005
- Fate: Bankruptcy
- Headquarters: Japan
- Area served: Japan
- Website: kss-inc.co.jp (archived)

KSS Inc. (株式会社ケイエスエス, Kabushiki-gaisha Kei Esu Esu) was a Japanese company that provided anime studio services including production, music, subtitles and translation. From 1993 to 2001, it also developed and published video games. KSS also created the adult brand Pink Pineapple.

== History ==
The company was founded as Kamakura Super Station Inc. (株式会社鎌倉スーパーステーション, Kabushiki-gaisha Kamakura Sūpā Sutēshon) with KSS being its abbreviation. The company changed its name to KSS Inc. in the early 1990s.

In 2004, KSS went bankrupt and sold its assets to Softgarage.

== Anime projects ==
- Barbapapa
- Battle Angel (OVA)
- Calimero
- Comic Party
- Comic Party Revolution
- Dokyusei 2 (OVA)
- Dosokai Yesterday Once More (OVA)
- Dragon Knight: The Wheel of Time (OVA)
- Elf ban Kakyuusei (OVA)
- Elf Princess Rane (OVA)
- Fire Emblem (OVA)
- Golden Boy (OVA)
- Guardian Hearts (OVA)
- Happy Lesson (OVA)
- Happy Lesson
- Happy Lesson Advance
- Happy Lesson The Final (OVA)
- Happy World! (OVA)
- The Heroic Legend of Arslan (OVA)
- Iczelion (OVA)
- Idol Project (OVA)
- Judge (OVA)
- Legend of Basara
- Level C (OVA)
- Lime-iro Senkitan
- Maps
- Mask of Zeguy (OVA)
- Mighty Space Miners (OVA)
- Moekan (OVA)
- Naruto
- Oh My Goddess! (OVA)
- One: Kagayaku Kisetsu e (OVA)
- Phantom - The Animation (OVA)
- Plastic Little (OVA)
- Rei Rei (OVA)
- Saiyuki Reload
- Tattoon Master (OVA)
- To Heart
- True Love Story (OVA)
- Variable Geo (OVA)
- Wedding Peach
- Wind: A Breath of Heart (OVA)

== Video game projects ==
- Aoki Densetsu Shoot!
- Bing Bing! Bingo
- Bishoujo Wrestler Retsuden : Blizzard Yuki Rannyuu
- Casper (Super Famicom release)
- Goiken Muyou: Anarchy in the Nippon
- Majyūō (King of Demons)
- Max Surfing 2000
- Yokozuna Monogatari
