= List of hentai companies =

The following is a list of companies that had been, or are producing Hentai. This list only includes notable examples of companies that have received significant coverage outside of their respective works. Most of the listed entries are Japanese in origin as the term is coined from that particular country. The publication of erotic materials in the United States can be traced back to at least 1990, when IANVS Publications printed its first Anime Shower Special. Central Park Media's 1993 release of Urotsukidoji brought the first hentai film to American viewers.

Name	Country	Type	Founded	Defunct
0verflow	Japan	Visual novels	1999	Active
âge	Japan	Visual novels	1998	Active
AliceSoft	Japan	Video games	1989	Active
Akabeisoft2	Japan	Visual novels	2005	Active
Arms Corporation	Japan	Anime	1996	2020
August	Japan	Visual novels	2001	Active
Candy Soft	Japan	Visual novels	1997	Active
Circus	Japan	Visual novels	2000	Active
Cocktail Soft	Japan	Visual novels	1989	Active
Core Magazine	Japan	Magazine	1985	Active
Cherry Lips	Japan	Anime	Unknown	Unknown
ELF Corporation	Japan	Video games	1988	2015
Eushully	Japan	Video games	2005	Active
Fakku	United States	Manga	2006	Active
Frontwing	Japan	Visual novels	2000	Active
Giga	Japan	Visual novels	1993	2023
Green Bunny	Japan	Anime	1997	2005
Icarus Publishing	United States	Manga	2002	Unknown
Illusion	Japan	Video games	1993	2023
JAST USA	United States	Video games	1996	Active
Key	Japan	Visual novels	1998	Active
Leaf	Japan	Visual novels	1995	Active
Megatech Software	United States	Video games	1992	2010
Minori	Japan	Visual novels	2001	2019
Moonstone	Japan	Visual novels	2003	Active
Navel	Japan	Visual novels	2003	Active
Pink Pineapple	Japan	Anime	Unknown	Unknown
Studio Proteus	United States	Manga	1986	Unknown
Tactics	Japan	Visual novels	1997	2011
ZyX	Japan	Video games	1994	Active
