= Surf Riders =

1999 video game

- Developer: ACOT
- Publishers: JP: KSS; WW: Ubi Soft
- Platform: PlayStation
- Release: JP: November 18, 1999; NA: August 10, 2000; EU: September 29, 2000
- Genre: Sports
- Modes: Single-player, multiplayer

Surf Riders, known in Japan as Max Surfing 2000 (マックスサーフィン2000, Makkusu Sāfin 2000), and in Europe as Gerry Lopez Surf Riders, is a video game developed by ACOT and published by KSS and Ubi Soft for the PlayStation in 1999-2000.

== Gameplay ==
In this game the player receives a score based on variety, endurance and the difficulty of tricks performed on beaches throughout the world.

There are five beaches to surf, each providing different waves to ride:

1. Manly Beach, Australia
2. Grand Plage, Lacanau, France
3. Huntington Beach, California
4. Tonami Beach, Japan
5. Pipeline, Hawaii

== Reception ==
Reception

Aggregate score
Aggregator	Score
Metacritic	64/100

Review scores
Publication	Score
AllGame	1/5
Electronic Gaming Monthly	3/10
Famitsu	23/40
Game Informer	6.75/10
GameFan	78% (Note: In GameFan's viewpoint of the game, one critic gave it 74, and the other 82.)
GameSpot	6/10
IGN	6.5/10
Jeuxvideo.com	13/20
Next Generation	3/5
PlayStation Official Magazine – UK	1/10
Official U.S. PlayStation Magazine	1.5/5
Maxim	2/5

The game received "mixed" reviews according to the review aggregation website Metacritic. IGN called the game "ridiculously hard, but once you get into it, it's ridiculously fun". GameSpot said that it was a fun game, but it lacked variety. Chris Charla of NextGen said that the game was "too limited to earn another star, but it is unquestionably addictive as hell." In Japan, Famitsu gave it a score of 23 out of 40. Vicious Sid of GamePro called it "a fun, but flawed, ride." (Note: GamePro gave the game two 3.5/5 scores for graphics and fun factor, 4/5 for sound, and 3/5 for control.)
