= 1994 in animation =

1994 in animation is an overview of notable events, including notable awards, list of films released, television show debuts and endings, and notable deaths.

== Events ==
=== January ===
- January 3: The first episode of Once Upon a Time... The Discoverers, produced by Albert Barillé, airs.
- January 4: The first episode of Budgie the Little Helicopter airs.
- January 18: The Peanuts TV special You're in the Super Bowl, Charlie Brown premieres on NBC. This was the last Peanuts special to air on television until the premiere of A Charlie Brown Valentine 8 years later. This is also the only Peanuts special to receive limited marketing on VHS as several trademarks are owned by NFL.
- January 26: The first episode of The Critic airs. It will gain a cult following.

=== February ===
- February 6: The first episode of Aladdin is broadcast.

=== March ===
- March 5: The first episode of Duckman airs. The show will gain a cult following.
- March 9: The first episode of The Busy World of Richard Scarry airs.
- March 21: 66th Academy Awards:
  - The Wallace and Gromit short film The Wrong Trousers by Nick Park wins the Academy Award for Best Animated Short Film.
- March 27: The stand-alone Tiny Toon Adventures TV special "Tiny Toon Spring Break" premieres on Fox. Yakko, Wakko, Dot, Pinky, & the Brain from Animaniacs all make cameos in this special.
- March 30: Don Bluth and Gary Goldman's Thumbelina premieres. One of the five lesser Bluth films as this led to a bankruptcy against Sullivan Bluth Studios in Ireland. Warner Bros. gave up distribution of this film to 20th Century Fox in 2002.

=== April ===
- April 15: The first episode of Space Ghost Coast to Coast airs, Cartoon Network's first adult oriented program.
- April 28: The 100th episode of The Simpsons, "Sweet Seymour Skinner's Baadasssss Song", first airs.

=== May ===
- May 19: The Simpsons concludes its fifth season on Fox with the episode "Secrets of a Successful Marriage".
- May 20: The Return of Jafar is released, being the first direct-to-video film by the Walt Disney Company.

=== June ===
- June 13: The first episode of Dr. Zitbag's Transylvania Pet Shop airs.
- June 15: The Lion King, produced by the Walt Disney Company, is first released.

=== July ===
- July 11: PBS repackaged their existing children's educational programming as a new block called "PTV Park".
- July 16: Isao Takahata's Pom Poko premieres.

=== September ===
- September 4: Season 6 of The Simpsons begins on Fox with the premiere of the episode "Bart of Darkness".
- September 10:
  - The first episodes of ReBoot and The Magic School Bus premiere on YTV (ReBoot) & PBS (Magic School Bus).
  - Jan Švankmajer's Faust premieres.
- September 17: The 7th & final season of Garfield and Friends begins on CBS with the premiere of the following episodes:
  - "The Legend of Johnny Ragweedseed/Grape Expectations (Part 1)/Catch As Cats Can't"
  - "A Matter of Conscience/Grape Expectations (Part 2)/Top Ten"
- September 22: The first episode of The Britt Allcroft Company's Magic Adventures of Mumfie airs.
- September 24: The first episodes of Fantastic Four and Iron Man air.
- September 29: Asterix Conquers America, the sixth Astérix film, premieres.

=== October ===
- October 7: Don Bluth's A Troll in Central Park premieres.
- October 12: DreamWorks Animation is founded along with DreamWorks Pictures.
- October 21: Cartoon Network Studios is founded.
- October 24: The first episode of Gargoyles airs.
- October 29: The first episode of Aaahh!! Real Monsters airs.
- October 30: The Simpsons' "Treehouse of Horror V" premieres on Fox.
- October 31: The first episode of The Itsy Bitsy Spider airs.

=== November ===
- November 3: The German animated feature Felidae is first released. It will gain cult status later.
- November 6: The compilation film In Search of Dr. Seuss premieres on TNT.
- November 15: Pinocchio and the 1933 Betty Boop cartoon Snow-White are added to the National Film Registry.
- November 18: The film The Swan Princess premieres.
- November 19:
  - The first episode of Spider-Man airs.
  - Phil Hartman hosts a featurette for How the Grinch Stole Christmas!: Special Edition on TNT during the Seuss-a-bration marathon.
- November 21: The Flintstones’ TV movie A Flintstones Christmas Carol premieres, which reverts to the status quo of the characters before their depiction in The Pebbles and Bamm-Bamm Show.
- November 23: The mix between live-action and animation, The Pagemaster, starring Macaulay Culkin premieres. It was a box office bomb during its original theatrical release as 20th Century Fox suspends theatrical animated films until 1997 when its sister company Fox Animation Studios releases the film Anastasia.

=== December ===
- December 4: The film Sailor Moon S: The Movie premieres.
- December 10: The final episode of Garfield and Friends airs on CBS.
- December 13: The Land Before Time II: The Great Valley Adventure, the direct-to-video sequel of The Land Before Time, was released. It was the first Bluth-less sequel released as a direct-to-video as more would continue up to 14 films.
- December 21: Chuck Jones' Wile E. Coyote and Road Runner cartoon Chariots of Fur premieres in theaters alongside Richie Rich, produced by Warner Bros. Animation. This was Jones' final short starring Wile E. Coyote and the Road Runner before the animator's death nearly 8 years later.

=== Specific date unknown ===
- The first episode of Katie and Orbie airs.
- Janie Geiser's The Red Book is first released.

== Films released ==
- January 1 - Goldilocks and the Three Bears (Australia)
- January 22 - Kattobase! Dreamers —Carp Tanjō Monogatari― (Japan)
- February 21 - Urotsukidōji III: Return of the Overfiend Director's Edition (Japan)
- March 12:
  - Doraemon: Nobita's Three Visionary Swordsmen (Japan)
  - Dragon Ball Z: Broly – Second Coming (Japan)
- March 19 - Happy, the Littlest Bunny (United States and Japan)
- March 21 - Plastic Little (Japan)
- March 30 - Thumbelina (United States and Ireland)
- April 3 - Yogi the Easter Bear (United States)
- April 9:
  - Sangokushi (dai 3-bu): Harukanaru Taichi (Japan)
  - Yu Yu Hakusho the Movie: Poltergeist Report (Japan)
- April 15 - Cinderella (United States and Japan)
- April 23 - Crayon Shin-chan: The Secret Treasure of Buri Buri Kingdom (Japan)
- April 30 - The Magic Flute (United States)
- May 20 - The Return of Jafar (United States)
- May 24 - Dengeki Oshioki Musume Gōtaman: Gōtaman Tanjō-hen (Japan)
- June 11 - J League o 100-bai Tanoshiku Miru Hōhō!! (Japan)
- June 15 - The Lion King (United States)
- June 19 - Dot in Space (Australia)
- June 21 - The Jungle King (United States)
- July 9:
  - Dragon Ball Z: Bio-Broly (Japan)
  - Slam Dunk: Conquer the Nation, Hanamichi Sakuragi! (Japan)
- July 16:
  - Fatal Fury: The Motion Picture (Japan)
  - The Life of Guskou Budori (Japan)
  - Pom Poko (Japan)
  - Soreike! Anpanman Ririkaru Majikaru Mahō no Gakkō (Japan)
- July 20 - Leo the Lion: King of the Jungle (United States and Japan)
- July 23 - Super Kid (South Korea)
- July 29 - Lupin III: Dragon of Doom (Japan)
- August 6 - Street Fighter II: The Animated Movie (Japan)
- August 19 - Once Upon a Time (Norway)
- August 20 - Ghost Sweeper Mikami: The Great Paradise Battle!! (Japan)
- August 21:
  - Baki the Grappler (Japan)
  - Captain Tsubasa: The Most Powerful Opponent! Holland Youth (Japan)
- August 25 - Cosmic Fantasy: Galaxy Cougar's Trap (Japan)
- September 3 - Scooby-Doo in Arabian Nights (United States)
- September 8 - Samurai Shodown: The Motion Picture (Japan)
- September 29 - Asterix Conquers America (Germany and France)
- October 4:
  - The Night Before Christmas (United States)
  - Taxandria (Belgium)
- October 7 - A Troll in Central Park (United States)
- October 8 - Darkside Blues (Japan)
- October 19:
  - Pocahontas (United States and Japan)
  - The Story of Christmas (United States and France)
- October 24 - Dengeki Oshioki Musume Gōtaman R: Ai to Kanashimi no Final Battle (Japan)
- October 25 - The Gate to the Mind's Eye (United States)
- November 3 - Felidae (Germany)
- November 5:
  - Blue Seagull (South Korea)
  - A Christmas Carol (United States and Japan)
  - The Secret Garden (Japan)
- November 18 - The Swan Princess (United States)
- November 21 - A Flintstones Christmas Carol (United States)
- November 23 - The Pagemaster (United States)
- December 4 - Sailor Moon S: The Movie (Japan)
- December 13 - The Land Before Time II: The Great Valley Adventure (United States)
- December 23 - The Hero of Two Worlds (Italy)
- Specific date unknown:
  - The Land Surveyor (Russia)
  - The Return of the North Wind (Spain)

== Television series debuts ==
Date	Title	Channel	Year
January 26	The Critic	ABC, Fox	1994–2001
February 5	Where on Earth Is Carmen Sandiego?	Fox Kids	1994–1999
February 6	Aladdin	Disney Channel	1994–1995
March 5	Conan and the Young Warriors	CBS	1994
March 5	Duckman	USA Network	1994–1997
March 9	The Busy World of Richard Scarry	Showtime, Nick Jr.	1994–1997
March 16	Albert the Fifth Musketeer	Children's BBC	1994
April 15	Space Ghost Coast to Coast	Cartoon Network	1994–1999
July 2	Mutant League	Syndication	1994–1996
August 15	The Brothers Grunt	MTV	1994–1995
September 1	The Head	MTV	1994–1996
September 10	Bump in the Night	ABC	1994–1995
September 10	ReBoot	ABC, Syndication	1994–1999
September 10	The Magic School Bus	PBS Kids	1994–1997
September 10	Beethoven	CBS	1994
September 10	The Tick (1994)	Fox Kids	1994–1996
September 10	BattleTech: The Animated Series	Fox	1994
September 11	Mega Man (1994)	Syndication	1994–1996
September 11	Street Sharks	Syndication	1994–1997
September 17	The Baby Huey Show	Syndication	1994–1995
September 18	Highlander: The Animated Series	USA Network	1994–1996
September 18	Phantom 2040	Syndication	1994–1996
September 24	Free Willy	ABC	1994–1995
September 24	Hurry Hurry, Tom and Jerry	TBS	1994–1996
September 24	Iron Man	Syndication	1994–1996
September 24	Fantastic Four (1994)	Syndication	1994–1996
September 28	Dino Babies	BBC One	1994–1996
October 1	Wild C.A.T.s	CBS	1994–1995
October 4	Creepy Crawlers	Syndication	1994–1996
October 7	The Itsy Bitsy Spider	USA Network	1994–1996
October 24	Gargoyles	Syndication, ABC	1994–1997
October 29	Aaahh!!! Real Monsters	Nickelodeon	1994–1997
November 19	Spider-Man (1994)	Fox Kids	1994–1998
December 18	Life with Louie	Fox, Fox Kids	1994–1998

== Television series endings ==
Date	Title	Channel	Year	Notes
January 2	Doug	Nickelodeon	1991–1994	Cancelled, until revived by ABC in 1996.
January 23	Madeline	The Family Channel	1993–1994	Cancelled, until revived by ABC in 1995.
January 28	Cadillacs and Dinosaurs	CBS	1993–1994	Cancelled
February 23	Bonkers	CBS, The Disney Channel, Syndication	1993–1994	Cancelled
May 22	Rugrats	Nickelodeon	1991–1994, 1996–2004	Cancelled, until revived in 1996.
August 27	Conan and the Young Warriors	CBS	1994	Cancelled
October 22	Cro	ABC	1993–1994	Cancelled
November 3	Exosquad	Syndication	1993–1994	Cancelled
November 26	Dog City	Fox Kids	1992–1994	Cancelled
November 26	The Little Mermaid	CBS	1992–1994	Cancelled
December 2	Mighty Max	Syndication	1993–1994	Cancelled
December 3	Sonic the Hedgehog	ABC	1993–1994	Cancelled
December 3	Beethoven	CBS	1994	Cancelled
December 4	Double Dragon	Syndication	1993–1994	Cancelled
December 4	Problem Child	USA Network	1993–1994	Cancelled
December 10	Garfield and Friends	CBS	1988–1994	Cancelled
December 10	BattleTech: The Animated Series	Fox	1994	Cancelled

== Television season premieres ==
Date	Title	Season	Channel
March 14	Beavis and Butt-Head	4	MTV
September 4	The Simpsons	6	Fox
September 10	Animaniacs	2	Fox Kids (Fox)
September 24	Rocko's Modern Life	2	Nickelodeon
October 1	The Ren & Stimpy Show	4	Nickelodeon
October 31	Beavis and Butt-Head	5	MTV

== Television season finales ==
Date	Title	Season	Channel
January 2	Doug	4 (Note: This was the last season to air on Nickelodeon, the show was acquired by Disney and returned for its fifth season on ABC two years later.)	Nickelodeon
January 2	Rocko's Modern Life	1	Nickelodeon
March 5	Beavis and Butt-Head	3	MTV
May 19	The Simpsons	5	Fox
May 23	Animaniacs	1	Fox Kids (Fox)
July 15	Beavis and Butt-Head	4	MTV
July 30	The Ren & Stimpy Show	3	Nickelodeon
November 12	Animaniacs	2 (Note: This was the last season to air on Fox, as the show moved over to The WB for the premiere of its third season next year.)	Fox Kids (Fox)

== Births ==
=== January ===
- January 21: Booboo Stewart, American actor (voice of Jay in Descendants: Wicked World, Jack O'Lantern in the Spider-Man episode "Bring on the Bad Guys", Kevin in the Big City Greens episode "Big Resolution").
- January 28: Maluma, Colombian singer (voice of Mariano in Encanto).
- January 29: Ayane Sakura, Japanese actress (voice of Ochaco Uraraka / Uravity in My Hero Academia, Secre Swallowtail in Black Clover, Yotsuba Nakano in The Quintessential Quintuplets, Natsumi Koshigaya in Non Non Biyori, Gabi Braun in Attack on Titan, Ayane in Weathering With You, Tsubaki Sawabe in Your Lie in April, Iroha Isshiki in My Youth Romantic Comedy Is Wrong, As I Expected, Suzuka Dairenji in Tokyo Ravens, Nagato-class, Sendai-class, Kuma, Tama, Shimakaze in Kantai Collection, Cocoa Hoto in Is the Order a Rabbit?, Ran Mitake in BanG Dream!, Clarisse in Granblue Fantasy, Hasuki Komai in Boarding School Juliet, Nao Tomori in Charlotte, Rinne in Pretty Rhythm: Rainbow Live and King of Prism, Prinz Eugen in Azur Lane, dub voice of Ms. Chalice in The Cuphead Show!).

=== February ===
- February 11: Dominic Janes, American former child actor (portrayed Jimmy in Re-Animated and Out of Jimmy's Head, voice of Sammy Paré / Squid Boy in Wolverine and the X-Men).
- February 23: Dakota Fanning, American actress (voice of young Kim Possible in Kim Possible: A Sitch in Time, Satsuki Kusakabe in My Neighbor Totoro, Lilo in Lilo & Stitch 2: Stitch Has a Glitch, the title character in Coraline, young Wonder Woman in the Justice League Unlimited episode "Kid Stuff").
- February 27: Rie Takahashi, Japanese voice actress and singer (voice of Miki Naoki in School-Live!, Mash Kyrielight in Fate/Grand Order, Megumin in KonoSuba, Mirai Asahina/Cure Miracle in Witchy PreCure!, Emilia in Re:Zero − Starting Life in Another World, Futaba Ichinose in Seiyu's Life!, Takagi in Teasing Master Takagi-san, Dan Kouzo in Bakugan: Battle Planet, Sumi Sakurasawa in Rent-A-Girlfriend).

=== March ===
- March 1: Justin Bieber, Canadian singer (voice of A.Z. in Angelina Ballerina: The Next Steps, himself in The Simpsons episode "The Fabulous Faker Boy").
- March 10: Alan Ituriel, Mexican cartoonist and voice actor (creator and voice of Black Hat in Villainous).
- March 26: AJ Bridel, Canadian actress and singer (voice of Pipp Petals in My Little Pony: Make Your Mark and My Little Pony: Tell Your Tale).
- March 29: Jack Bandeira, English actor (voice of Aelwulf in the Unicorn: Warriors Eternal episode "The Heart of Kings").

=== April ===
- April 2: Sofie Zamchick, American actress and musician (voice of Linny in Wonder Pets!).
- April 8: Johnny LaZebnik, American production assistant (Norman Picklestripes), television writer and son of Rob LaZebnik (Norman Picklestripes, The Simpsons, Ridley Jones, Rugrats, Eureka!).
- April 13: Gints Zilbalodis, Latvian filmmaker, animator and composer (Away, Flow).
- April 15: Arif Zahir, American actor, musician, and internet personality (continued voice of Cleveland Brown in Family Guy).
- April 16: Liliana Mumy, American actress (voice of Leni Loud in The Loud House, Twinkle in Higglytown Heroes, Panini in Chowder, Beth Tezuka in Bravest Warriors, continued voice of Mertle Edmonds in the Lilo & Stitch franchise).
- April 18: Moisés Arias, American actor (voice of Zane in Astro Boy, Antonio Perez in Despicable Me 2, Marcus in The Emperor's New School episode "Rabbit Face", Fred in the Phineas and Ferb episode "Phineas and Ferb's Quantum Boogaloo").
- April 24: Jordan Fisher, American actor and musician (voice of Sea Hawk in She-Ra and the Princesses of Power, Finley in Archibald's Next Big Thing, Robaire in Turning Red).

=== May ===
- May 4: Alexander Gould, American actor (voice of Nemo in Finding Nemo, Bambi in Bambi II, Jimmy Olsen in Superman: Unbound, Carl in Finding Dory).

=== June ===
- June 16: Caitlyn Taylor Love, American actress and musician (voice of Ava Ayala / White Tiger in Ultimate Spider-Man).
- June 29: Camila Mendes, American actress (voice of Melody in Fairfax, Tessa Ross in The Simpsons episode "The Hateful Eight-Year-Olds").

=== July ===
- July 24: Jaboukie Young-White, American actor and comedian (voice of McNelly in Ralph Breaks the Internet, Ethan Clade in Strange World, Mbita in Baymax!, Connor in Ruby Gillman, Teenage Kraken).

=== August ===
- August 17: Taissa Farmiga, American actress (voice of Raven in the DC Animated Movie Universe).
- August 18: Michaela Jill Murphy, American actress (voice of Toph Beifong in Avatar: The Last Airbender, Chacha in The Emperor's New Groove franchise, young Franny Robinson in Meet the Robinsons, young Suyin in The Legend of Korra episode "Old Wounds").
- August 23: Francesca Reale, American actress (voice of Sydnie in Entergalactic, Aizmuth in Strange World).
- August 29: Eduardo Franco, American actor and comedian (voice of DJ Catnip in Gabby's Dollhouse, Trevin in Ruby Gillman, Teenage Kraken, Pako in Koati, Darryl in Goat, Loaf in Hoppers).

=== September ===
- September 25: Jansen Panettiere, American actor (voice of Truman X in The X's, Periwinkle in season 6 of Blue's Clues, young Rodney Copperbottom in Robots, Shovelmouth Boy in Ice Age: The Meltdown), (d. 2023).
- September 29: Halsey, American singer (voice of Wonder Woman in Teen Titans Go! To the Movies, Porsha Crystal in Sing 2, herself in the American Dad! episode "A Nice Night for a Drive" and the Scooby-Doo and Guess Who? episode "The New York Underground!").

=== November ===
- November 10: Zoey Deutch, American actress and producer (voice of Tech Jacket in Invincible, Lily in Fairfax, Debbie in Minions & Monsters).
- November 15: Alejandro Saab, American voice actor (voice of Tamotsu Denkigai in Akiba's Trip: The Animation, Takezo Kurata in Kono Oto Tomare! Sounds of Life, Kazuki Yasaka in Sarazanmai, Izumi Miyamura in Horimiya, Tatsuya Shiba in The Irregular at Magic High School, Leon in Pokémon Journeys: The Series, Marc Anciel in season 4 of Miraculous: Tales of Ladybug & Cat Noir).
- November 16: India Ennenga, American actress (voice of the title character in Pinky Dinky Doo).

=== December ===
- December 3: Jake T. Austin, American actor (voice of Diego in Dora the Explorer and seasons 1-3 of Go, Diego, Go!, Nicky in The Ant Bully, Fernando in Rio and Rio 2, Alex in The Emoji Movie, Blue Beetle in Justice League Action and the DC Animated Movie Universe).
- December 10: Kayli Mills, American actress (voice of Emilia in Re:Zero − Starting Life in Another World, Alice Zuberg in Sword Art Online).
- December 17: Nat Wolff, American actor (voice of Victor in Leap!, Batman in Justice League x RWBY: Super Heroes & Huntsmen).

== Deaths ==
=== January ===
- January 5: Joop Du Buy, Dutch animator, textile salesman, and comics artist (worked for Nederland Film during World War II), dies at age 59.
- January 8: Pat Buttram, American actor (voice of Napoleon in The Aristocats, the Sheriff of Nottingham in Robin Hood, Luke in The Rescuers, Chief in The Fox and the Hound, Cactus Jake in Garfield and Friends), dies at age 78.
- January 28: Hal Smith, American actor (voice of Owl in Winnie the Pooh, Goliath in Davey and Goliath, Flintheart Glomgold and Gyro Gearloose in DuckTales, continued voice of Goofy, Elmer Fudd, and Winnie the Pooh), dies at age 77.
- January 29: Yevgeny Leonov, Soviet and Russian actor (voice of the title character in Winnie-the-Pooh, Winnie-the-Pooh Pays a Visit, and Winnie-the-Pooh and a Busy Day), dies at age 67.

=== February ===
- February 1: Olan Soule, American actor (voice of Batman in The Adventures of Batman, Sesame Street, The New Scooby-Doo Movies, and Super Friends, Master Taj in Fantastic Planet, the Boy's Father in The Small One, Martin Stein in Super Friends: The Legendary Super Powers Show), dies at age 84.
- February 6: Jack Kirby, American comics artist and animator (Fleischer Studios, Hanna-Barbera, Ruby-Spears), dies at age 76.
- February 8: Raymond Scott, American composer, dies at age 85.
- February 11:
  - William Conrad, American actor (voice of the narrator in Rocky and Bullwinkle), dies at age 73.
  - Sorrell Booke, American actor (voice of Boss Hogg in The Dukes, Mayor Fist in The Pound Puppies, Sheriff Rufus and TJ Buzby in Scooby-Doo Meets the Boo Brothers, Big Daddy Boo in Tiny Toon Adventures: How I Spent My Vacation, Pinky in Rock-a-Doodle, Boss Hoss in the Bonkers episode "Love Stuck", Sheriff Hebbs in The New Adventures of Captain Planet episode "Jail House Flock"), dies at age 64.
- February 17: Lou Bunin, American puppeteer and animator (Alice in Wonderland), dies from a stroke at age 89.
- February 24: Dinah Shore, American singer and actress (sang the "Two Silhouettes" segment in Make Mine Music, and narrated and sang the "Bongo the Bear" segment in Fun and Fancy Free), dies at age 77.

=== March ===
- March 4: John Candy, Canadian comedian and actor (voice of Den, Dan, Desk Sergeant and Robot in Heavy Metal, Wilbur in The Rescuers Down Under, himself in Camp Candy), dies from a heart attack at age 43.
- March 10: Reuben Timmins, American animator and comics artist (Fleischer Studios, Van Beuren Studios, Terrytoons, Walt Disney Company, Hanna-Barbera, Tom & Jerry, Crusader Rabbit, Peanuts, Fat Albert and the Cosby Kids), dies at age 84.
- March 22: Walter Lantz, American animator, cartoonist, film director, and film producer (Walter Lantz Productions, Andy Panda, Woody Woodpecker, Chilly Willy, Oswald the Lucky Rabbit), dies at age 94.
- March 29: Paul Grimault, French animator and film director (Le Roi et l'oiseau), dies at age 89.
- March 31: José Escobar Saliente, Spanish animator, comics writer and artist, dies at age 85.

=== April ===
- April 3: Frank Wells, American businessman (president and chief operating officer of The Walt Disney Company), dies at age 62 in a helicopter crash.

=== May ===
- May 25: Sonny Sharrock, American jazz guitarist and composer (Space Ghost Coast to Coast), dies from a heart attack at age 53.

=== June ===
- June 10: Jack Hannah, American animator, film director, screenwriter, and comic writer and artist (Walt Disney Animation Studios, Walter Lantz), dies at age 81.
- June 12: Christopher Collins, American actor (voice of Starscream in The Transformers, Cobra Commander in G.I. Joe: A Real American Hero, Mr. Burns and Moe Szyslak in season 1 of The Simpsons), dies at age 44.
- June 14: Henry Mancini, American composer and conductor (The Pink Panther Theme, The Great Mouse Detective, Tom and Jerry: The Movie), dies at age 70.
- June 23: Piet van Elk, Dutch comics artist and animator (Stripfilm, Hanna-Barbera), dies at age 74.
- June 28: Richard Bickenbach, American animator and comics artist (Ub Iwerks, Warner Bros. Cartoons, MGM, Hanna-Barbera), dies at age 86.

=== July ===
- July 23: Owen Fitzgerald, American animator and comics artist (Walt Disney Company, Fleischer Studios, Warner Bros. Cartoons, DePatie-Freleng, Hanna-Barbera), dies at age 77.
- July 26: Terry Scott, English actor (voice of Penfold in Danger Mouse), dies from cancer at age 67.

=== August ===
- August 1: Augstí Ascensio Saurí, Spanish animator and comics artist (El mago de los sueños), dies in a car accident at age 45.
- August 4: Stanislav Látal, Czech puppeteer, animator and film director (Adventures of Robinson Crusoe, a Sailor from York), dies at age 75.
- August 24: Rickie Sorensen, American actor (voice of Spotty in 101 Dalmatians, Arthur in The Sword in the Stone), dies at age 47.
- August 26: Werner Klemke, German animator, illustrator and comics artist (worked as an animator in the late 1930s), dies at age 77.

=== September ===
- September 1: Thomas Chastain, American author (co-wrote The Simpsons episode "Black Widower"), dies from lung cancer at age 73.

=== October ===
- October 3: Dub Taylor, American actor (voice of Digger in The Rescuers), dies at age 87.
- October 5: Doug Wildey, American comics artist and animator (Jonny Quest), dies at age 72.

=== November ===
- November 2: Martin Taras, American comics artist and animator (Fleischer Studios, Famous Studios, Hanna-Barbera, Terrytoons, Ralph Bakshi) and character designer (Baby Huey), dies at age 80.
- November 5: Nikolay Fyodorov, Russian animator, film director and cartoonist (co-director of The Snow Queen), dies at age 80.
- November 18: Cab Calloway, American jazz singer and dancer (voiced singing characters in the Betty Boop shorts Minnie the Moocher, Snow-White, The Old Man of the Mountain), dies at age 86.
- November 23: Irwin Kostal, American musical arranger (Walt Disney Animation Studios, Charlotte's Web), dies at age 83.
- November 30: Lionel Stander, American actor (voice of Buzz Buzzard in Woody Woodpecker, Kup in The Transformers: The Movie), dies at age 86.

=== Specific date unknown ===
- Izzy Ellis, American animator (Warner Bros. Cartoons, Paramount Cartoon Studios, Hanna-Barbera), dies at age 83 or 84.

== See also ==
- 1994 in anime
