= Rei Rei =

Original video animation

美しき性の伝道師麗々 (Utsukushiki Sei no Dendoshi Rei Rei)
- Genre: Hentai
- Original video animation
- Directed by: Yoshisuke Yamaguchi
- Produced by: Hiroshi Iwakawa
- Written by: Toshimitsu Shimizu
- Music by: Hiroyuki Ishizuka
- Studio: Aubeck, AIC, KSS, Pink Pineapple
- Licensed by: NA: SoftCel Pictures
- Released: 1993
- Episodes: 2

Rei Rei (美しき性の伝道師麗々, Utsukushiki Sei no Dendoshi Rei Rei) (aka. Rei Rei: Missionary of Love) is a 2-episode Japanese hentai original video animation series produced by Aubeck. It was licensed by ADV but is now licensed by a division of ADV, SoftCel Pictures in United States. On April 22, 2003, SoftCel Pictures released the 2 OVA episodes on a DVD. Other releases include May 30, 2006 by Critical Mass, and April 13, 2010 by Kitty Media.

== Plot ==
=== OVA 1 ===
Kayuga, a Goddess of Love, looks at the moon from her residence in a limbo dimension between it and Earth. She and her faithful servant Pipi note that mankind's various sorrows are slowly but surely pushing the moon away from the planet. Kayuga decides the only way to stop this is for her and Pipi to go to Earth and save the moon by helping the anguished attain and achieve what they desire the most.

As they arrive on Earth, Tanaka, a young luckless romantic, attempts to surprise his dream girl, the wealthy Ikuko, with a bouquet of flowers and tickets to a baseball game for her birthday. Ikuko, however, harshly rejects Tanaka's attempts, claiming she has no interest in him (or men in general) at all and berates him for making such plans without her consent. She then tells him to never contact her or come by her place again, before running off, leaving Tanaka devastated and heartbroken over her rejection, which Kayuga and Pipi witness.

Ikuko then makes her way to the apartment of her lover and governess, Dr. Manami Shibata, whom she has become absolutely devoted to since they had sex after their first meeting, who suggests a dinner outing to celebrate Ikuko's birthday. Unbeknownst to her, Manami has grown tired of her and Ikuko's love affair, due to both Ikuko's clinginess and because she has become engaged to a fellow male doctor from her hospital, Akihiro Okabe. However, she does not wish to break off their relationship, as Ikuko has included Manami in her will. To that end, Manami conspires to murder Ikuko and disguise it as an accident in order to be rid of her, keep her inheritance, and marry Okabe.

Before they go out to dinner, Manami injects Ikuko with egg yolk, disguising it as a booster shot, which both Kayuga and Pipi witness. They then bring a still-distraught Tanaka (stopping him from impulsively committing suicide in the process) and bring him to the restaurant to see Ikuko and Manami together, which enrages him so much that he dashes off in a blind rage and has to be retrieved by Pipi. Meanwhile, Ikuko eats a dish that Manami ordered for her; unknown to her, the dish contains eggs, which due to the egg yolk shot given to her by Manami earlier, causes her to collapse from anaphylactic shock, which everyone sees as an allergic reaction to the dish. Ikuko is rushed to Manami's hospital at the latter's instruction, with Tanaka returning just in time to see her off, much to his distress.

As Ikuko lies in intensive care, Manami rendezvous with Okabe and the two share a kiss. Unknown to them, Kayuga witnesses this. She then takes Ikuko's soul to her dimension and to the Bridge of Dreams, which Pipi instructs that she must cross without looking back to achieve her greatest desire. When asked what her said desire is, Ikuko, still unaware of Manami's murderous plot, says that she hopes Manami will love her even in death. Kayuga tries to convince her to ask for something else, but Ikuko's devotion to her doctor is too strong; in her protest, Ikuko turns around before fully crossing and is spirited away from the bridge.

Back on Earth, Kayuga expresses disappointment in Ikuko's choice and asks Tanaka if he still wishes to help her. Tanaka confirms this, and Kayuga and Pipi then show him Manami's affair with Dr. Okabe, upsetting Tanaka. Manami then goes to Ikuko's room and injects her IV with more egg yolk, thus spelling her demise for certain.

Back in Kayuga's dimension, she properly introduces herself and tries again to make Ikuko see sense, but Ikuko refuses to listen. Kayuga then takes her back to the real world and reveals Manami's relationship with Dr. Okabe by showing them having passionate sex, and exposes Manami's evil intentions by causing her to have a waking dream in which Okabe points out Manami's murder plot and Manami is haunted by Ikuko's ghost. Finally seeing the truth, Ikuko breaks down, heartbroken over Manami's betrayal, before Kayuga returns with her to her dimension.

Elsewhere, Pipi attempts to comfort an enraged and drunken Tanaka, who swears he'll do anything to avenge Ikuko. Kayuga arrives and decides to grant him his wish by transforming him into a girl. She then encourages him to figure out what to do with his new body before leaving him.

The next day, the still-female Tanaka goes to Okabe's office and is able to use his new body to briefly seduce him before Manami interrupts them. He then does so again successfully after encountering Okabe again on the doctor's jogging route. Back in Kayuga's dimension, Ikuko continues to cry over Manami's betrayal and the belief that nobody loves her. But Kaguya proves her otherwise by showing her how far Tanaka was willing to go (even changing his gender) to avenge Ikuko, even after her previous rejection of him; Ikuko is left touched at his devotion.

Back on Earth, Ikuko's funeral ends and her body is taken to be cremated at Manami's instruction, in order to erase all evidence of her crime. Pipi sees this and rushes off. Meanwhile, at Okabe's apartment, he and Tanaka are about to have sex, but Tanaka stops him, reminding him of his engagement to Manami; to his surprise, Okabe brushes off Manami as nothing to him, not knowing that Manami is listening right outside his door. Manami then storms in, and catches the two together; but just as she does, Kayuga uses her powers to transform Tanaka back into a guy – at least in Manami's eyes, causing her to think that Okabe is having a gay affair. When Okabe (who still only sees Tanaka as a girl) proclaims that Tanaka is his true love, Manami, shocked and disgusted, storms out in utter disbelief. Okabe then turns to pounce on Tanaka, only for him (now a male again) to knock the doctor out cold.

Kayuga then reappears, and offers Tanaka the chance to remain a girl (with the promise of endless orgasms), which Tanaka is enticed by. Before he can choose, Pipi pops in and tells them of Ikuko's impending cremation, causing Tanaka to run to the crematorium (wearing only his girl-form's panties). He fights his way to Ikuko's coffin, and rips the top off, causing a burst of magical energy that transports Tanaka to Kayuga's dimension and the Bridge of Dreams. He crosses the bridge without looking back and is reunited with Ikuko's soul. Ikuko apologizes to Tanaka and thanks him for loving her. The two share their first kiss, and are propelled back to Earth, where Ikuko returns to life and embraces Tanaka.

Later, Tanaka and Ikuko seduce each other in an amusement park Ferris wheel as Kayuga and Pipi watch before leaving for their next mission.

=== OVA 2 ===
In her home dimension, just as she finishes her bath, Kayuga starts feeling intense emotions tremors emitting from the Earth's inhabitants. Determined once again to stop the world's hardships from driving away the moon, she and Pipi return to Earth to locate the source of the tremors.

Disguised as a fortune teller, she attempts to bring in some of the unfortunate-in-love people, with little to no success, until a young geeky boy named Satoshi finds a promo discarded by the girlfriend of a prospective customer. Reading it, he decides to pay Kayuga a visit.

Upon arriving, Satoshi becomes enamored by Kayuga's body. She then begins her analysis of him, and concludes that he has a lot of pent up sexual tension that he wishes to act on within, but something is holding him back from following through and letting out his true feelings. She also concludes that this has caused much friction in his relationship with his girlfriend Mika. Kaguya then attempts to get Satoshi to loosen up by using her body, but only succeeds in putting him in a frozen, grinning semi-comatose state that is only broken by Pipi's attempt to give him mouth-to-mouth. He then rushes out to meet Mika.

However, the meeting soon goes sour: Mika angrily expresses her frustration with Satoshi, that he constantly takes her to boring, nerdy places (such as video game stores and the planetarium) on their dates, and refuses to make love or any romantic moves or gestures (even holding her hand) towards her. When Satoshi continues making weak excuses, Mika loses her temper and insults him (calling him "clueless, boring, immature, and probably impotent"), before breaking off their relationship and walking away.

Devastated, Satoshi stands in disbelief as it starts to rain, before screaming in frustration and running home crying. Kayuga and Pipi witness this, and express disappointment over Satoshi blowing his chance, before deciding to return to their mission. Meanwhile, Satoshi returns home, and rejects his father's offer of a new dish for dinner. Later, he plays a video game furiously, as he vents his frustration over losing Mika; as he plays, his frustration soon becomes insane laughter, and upon getting a "Game Over", he suddenly falls into the same semi-comatose state as before.

Satoshi is soon discovered by his father and rushed to the hospital. Kaguya and Pipi, having traced the despairing tremors to Satoshi's neighborhood, witness this and soon trace the tremors to his video game. Transporting themselves inside it, the two realize that Satoshi's soul is trapped inside the game; Kaguya theorizes that the great shock, stress, and devastation over being dumped by Mika, combined with his own inner frustrations, left Satoshi so unbalanced that his soul departed from his body and was trapped in the game's software.

Kayuga and Pipi are then force to battle through the game's enemies, including a tentacle monster embedded with the most repressed part of Satoshi's soul, which Pipi manages to defeat, thus freeing Satoshi's soul. In the process, they briefly enter Satoshi's mind and are treated to a memory of Satoshi's mother leaving him as a young boy. The two then realize that this is what has been holding Satoshi back: his mother's abandonment was so devastating that it left him emotionally stunted and unable to bring himself to make moves on girls, out of fear that he'd make the wrong move and be abandoned again. At this, Kayuga decides to give Satoshi the "nurturing" he has lacked over the years.

At the hospital, where Satoshi has returned to normal (though still unconscious), Kayuga and Pipi take him through a happier memory with his mother, where she explains the constellations to him (thus explaining his fixation with stars). Kayuga then allows him to suck on her breasts, thus "nurturing" him like a mother and allowing him to emotionally develop and gain the potential to move forward. To that end, she then takes him to the Bridge of Dreams, where he crosses without looking back, allowing Kayuga to help him achieve his goal.

Satoshi then finds himself in the form of water – in Mika's bathtub. As Mika gets into the water, Satoshi covertly feels her up, causing her to jump out of the tub. Kayuga then transforms Satoshi into a corporeal form and encourages him to finally touch her the way he's dreamed of this whole time. Entranced by Mika's body, Satoshi does so and discovers that Mika can feel (though not see) him; according to Kayuga, this proves that she still loves him and regrets her previous insults and breaking up with him, which she expresses as Satoshi feels her up more and more. Kayuga then makes Satoshi visible to her for a second before leaving with him, causing Mika to brush it off as a steam hallucination.

The next morning at the hospital, in Satoshi's room, his father sadly expresses his self-perceived failure to being a good father and fill in the gap left in his son's heart since his wife's departure. However, Satoshi then wakes up (to his father's surprise and happiness) and debunks this, citing with a newfound confidence that he no longer needs his mother's missing love anymore and can move forward. Soon after, Mika arrives and apologizes to Satoshi for insulting and dumping him, and the two happily reconcile.

Later on, a newly confident Satoshi takes Mika on another date, with plans to go to a love hotel to finally consummate their relationship, much to her delight. Kayuga and Pipi then head off again, as a narrator explains Kayuga's purpose in the world, as the episode ends.

== Characters ==
Kaguya
Voiced by: Naoko Matsui
The main protagonist of the series. She is a Goddess of Love, who troubled by mankind's wavering difference one love, sets out to help the luckless-in-love work through their issues and obtain their desires.

Pipi
Voiced by: Kenichi Ogata
The secondary protagonist of the series. He is Kayuga's faithful sidekick in her ventures.

Tanaka
Voiced by: Wataru Takagi (male), Misa Watanabe (female)
The main protagonist of the first OVA.

Ikuko
Voiced by: Yuri Satō
Tanaka's love interest.

Dr. Manami Shibata
Voiced by: Miho Yoshida
The main antagonist of the first OVA.

Dr. Akihiro Okabe
Voiced by: Takehito Koyasu
The supporting antagonist of the first OVA.

Satoshi
Voiced by: Shin-ichiro Miki
The main protagonist of the second OVA.

Mika
Voiced by: Kumiko Nishihara
Satoshi's love interest.

Satoshi's Father
Voiced by: Mitsuaki Hoshino

Satoshi's Mother
Voiced by: Katsuyo Endō

== Reception ==
Stig Høgset at T.H.E.M. Anime Reviews criticises the OVA for its side characters. Chris Beveridge at Mania commends the OVA for its comedy and light sex.
