= Milk Money (band) =

American band

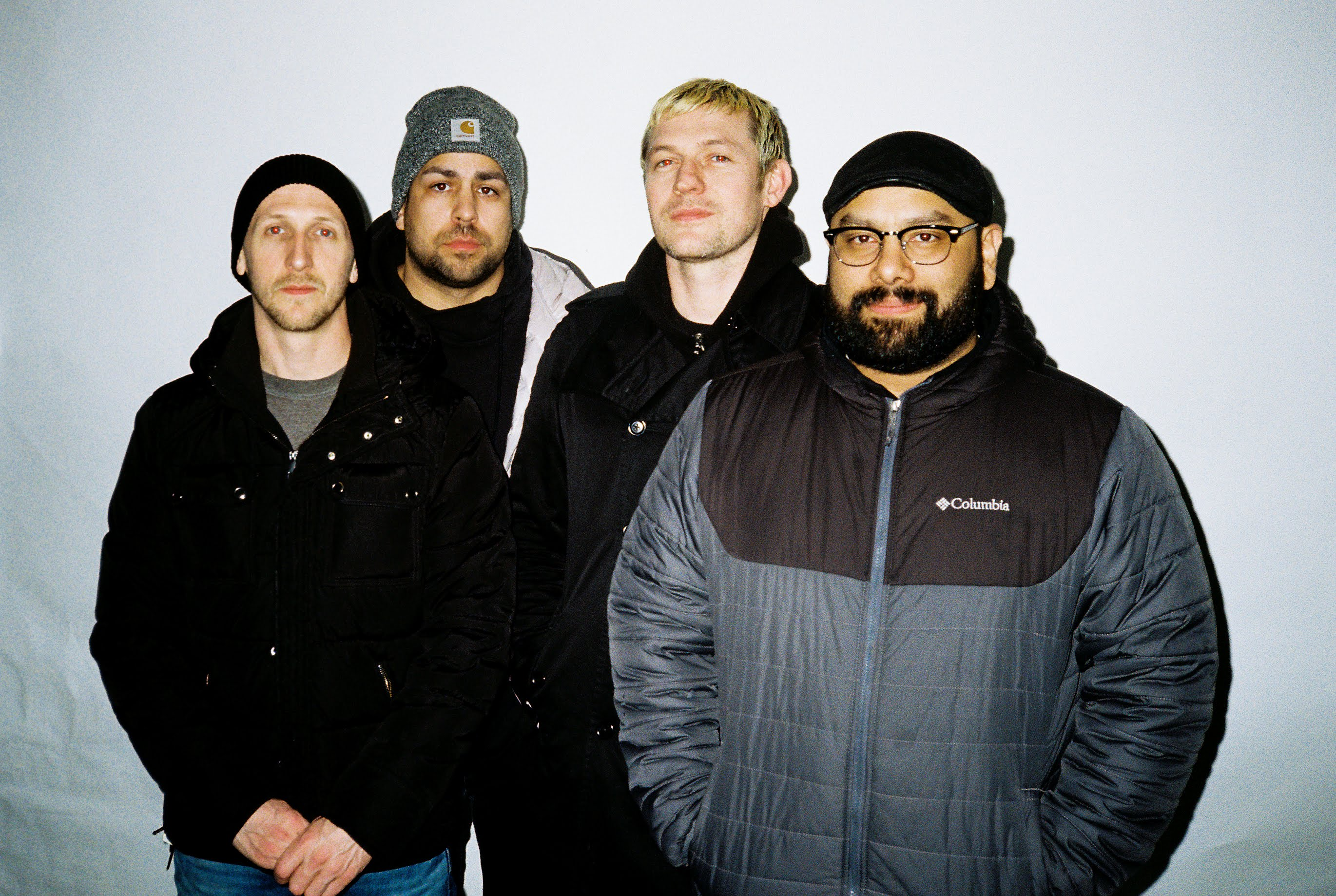
- Milk Money left to right: Trevor Hale, Drew Davenport, Dan Fletcher, Byron Colindres

Background information
- Also known as: M$1
- Origin: Salt Lake City, UT
- Genres: Hardrock, Post-Hardcore
- Years active: 2019–present
- Members: Dan Fletcher; Trevor Hale; Byron Colindres; Drew Davenport
- Website: milkmoneyrock.com

Milk Money is an American 4-piece hardrock/post-hardcore band from Salt Lake City, Utah.

The band formed in January 2019 and features members of mainstay Salt Lake City hardcore bands Cherem, City to City, and Tamerlane, among others. The band consists of guitarist/vocalist Dan Fletcher, guitarist Trevor Hale, bassist Byron Colindres, and drummer Drew Davenport.

Their debut album, Reckon, was recorded in August 2019 at Archive Recordings in Salt Lake City with producer Wes Johnson and mastered by Tyler Steadman. It was officially released independently on December 6, 2019.

Their second release, Howl, was released October 23, 2020. The album was recorded remotely due to the COVID-19 lockdown. The band tracked everything in home studios. It was then mixed and mastered by producer Scott Sellers.

== Members ==
=== Current ===
- Dan Fletcher - lead guitar, lead vocals
- Trevor Hale - rhythm guitar
- Byron Colindres - bass guitar, backing vocals
- Drew Davenport - drums, percussion

== Discography ==
=== Studio albums ===
- Reckon (Independent, 2019)

=== EPs ===
- Howl (Independent, 2020)
- Iron Will (Independent, 2021)

=== Singles ===
- Mad River - Demo (Independent, 2019)
- Black Rose (Independent, 2021)
