= Slave Doll =

2000 Japanese hentai OVA

- North American DVD cover of Slave Doll

こわれもの (Kowaremono)
- Genre: Pornographic, Science fiction
- Original video animation
- Directed by: Kaoru Toyooka (Otakey Sasaki)
- Studio: Soft On Demand
- Licensed by: NA: Kitty Media
- Released: May 20, 2000 – November 20, 2000
- Runtime: 31 minutes per episode
- Episodes: 3
- Original video animation

Slave Doll II
- Studio: Beam Entertainment
- Licensed by: NA: NuTech Digital
- Released: August 25, 2001 – November 25, 2001
- Runtime: 30 minutes per episode
- Episodes: 2

Slave Doll (Japanese: こわれもの, Hepburn: Kowaremono; literally "Fragile Things") is a Japanese pornographic original video animation created by Otakey Sasaki and released in 2000. The series revolves around Aki, a busty android maid constructed by the Gene (pronounced Gen-a) Corporation. Her function, besides being a household maid, is the collection of male genetic material (semen) through sexual means, after which it is saved, possibly for species preservation. Slave Doll was followed by a sequel, Slave Doll II (こわれものII, Kowaremono II) released in 2001 and produced by Beam Entertainment.

== Plot ==
Slave Doll tells the story of Aki, is an Android maid created by the Gene Corporation sent to infiltrate the house of the mysterious Kenichi. She disguises herself as an ordinary housekeeper and begins her mission to capture a sample of Kenichi's superior sperm which is made easy by her master's insatiable lust towards her.

In Slave Doll II, Aki's sperm collecting days are over, and rather than being scrapped, she serves an eccentric professor as his maid. The professor then gives Aki a bracelet that changes the maid into a super-crimefighter (in the mold of the magical girl).

== Reception ==
Bamboo Dong, writing for Anime News Network, disliked the humiliation themes of the original video animation (OVA). She found the story to be "standard," but "disjointed and awkward," attributing some of this to her dislike. Michael Thomas enjoyed the hints at Aki's past, and enjoyed the allusions to Cream Lemon and Wedding Peach. Derek Guder found the sex scenes "rote and unimaginative," but enjoyed the bad acting on the English dub track, finding it in parts "so bad it's good."
