= Taboo Charming Mother =

Hentai manga series

艶母 (Enbo)
- Genre: Erotica, drama, hentai
- Manga
- Written by: Tsuzuru Miyabi
- Published by: Tsukasa Shobō (1998); Mediax (2008)
- Original run: December 18, 1998 – November 25, 1999
- Volumes: 2
- Original video animation
- Directed by: Kan Fukumoto (ep.1–3); Shigeki Awai (ep. 4–6)
- Produced by: Reno Jan (ep.1–6); Takehito Watarai (ep.1–6)
- Written by: Senju Hananomoto (ep.1–3); Jun Kurokodairu (ep.4–6)
- Studio: Big Wing
- Licensed by: US: JapanAnime
- Released: November 25, 2003 – November 25, 2005
- Runtime: 30 minutes
- icon

Taboo Charming Mother (Japanese: 艶母, Hepburn: Enbo; lit. 'Charming Mother'), also known as Erotic Heart Mother, is a hentai manga series written and illustrated by Tsuzuru Miyabi and published by Tsukasa Shobō between 1998 and 1999.

It was later adapted into a six-episode original video animation (OVA) series produced by Milky between 2003 and 2005. The anime series was licensed in the US by JapanAnime.

== Plot ==
Misako Amamiya is a young and beautiful housewife who lives with her recently married husband, Yosuke Amamiya, and her stepson, Kazuhiko, who does not treat her with much affection. Although Misako tries to lead an ordinary life as a housewife, her sexual dissatisfaction prevents her from doing so. One day, with a simple anonymous phone call, Misako's life will change drastically.

== Characters ==
Misako Amamiya (雨宮 美沙子, Amamiya Misako)

Voiced by: Nagisa Futami (alias), Miyabi Kurosaki (real name)
She is the protagonist of the story, a young and beautiful housewife married to Yosuke Amamiya. All she wants is to live peacefully with her beloved husband and stepson, but a series of events will disturb the charming Misako.

Kazuhiko Amamiya (雨宮 一彦, Amamiya Kazuhiko)

Voiced by: Masumi Hirai/Tatsuya Hirai (aliases), (Note: Both names make reference to the same person. Masumi Hirai pseudonym was used for the first three episodes and Tatsuya Hirai for the last three.) Daisuke Hirakawa (real name)
The biological son of Yosuke Amamiya and stepson of Misako, he is a rebellious teenager who does not seem to accept his stepmother and acts coldly towards her. However, in time, the reason for his behavior will be revealed.

Emiko (悦美子, Emiko)

Voiced by: Yuu Mikage (alias), Hikaru Ikeda (real name)
Misako's younger sister. There is great sisterly affection between her and Misako, but as the story progresses, that affection turns into the opposite.

Yosuke Amamiya (雨宮 洋介, Amamiya Yosuke)

Voiced by: Back LEO (alias), Tomoaki Ikeda (real name)
Misako's husband and Kazuhiko's father, he is a middle-aged, respectful, and hard-working man who loves Misako, even though she is much younger than him. However, he is always preoccupied with his work and does not attend to his beloved wife's needs.

== Media ==
=== Manga ===
The manga was originally published in two volumes by Tsukasa Shobō and serialized in Comic Dolphin. A re-edition was published by Mediax in 2008.

==== Volumes ====
===== Tsukasa Shobō original release. =====
No.	Release date	ISBN
1	December 18, 1998	978-4-8128-0214-4
2	November 25, 1999	978-4-8128-0339-4

===== Mediax re-edition. =====
No.	Release date	ISBN
1	April 23, 2008	978-4-8620-1044-5
2	November 1, 2008	978-4-8620-1056-8

=== Anime ===
In 2003, a six-episode original video animation series was produced by Milky in collaboration with Big Wing, Enbo Anime Production Committee, Image House and Museum Pictures, and it was released in VHS and DVD.

The anime was also released in a subtitled version on DVD in the US between 2005 and 2007 by JapanAnime.

==== Episodes ====
No.	Title	Directed by	Original release date
1	"Unfulfilled Wife"; Transliteration: "Mitasarenu Hitozuma" (Japanese: 満たされぬ人妻)	Kan Fukumoto	November 25, 2003
It's been a year since Misako has been married to Yosuke Amamiya. Misako loves her husband more than anything in the world and takes good care of the household. However she has been sexually frustrated for a long time! Her frustration continues until one day, she receives a phone call from a mysterious man promising her satisfaction...
2	"The Forbidden Act"; Transliteration: "Rareta hitozuma" (Japanese: ハメられた人妻)	Kan Fukumoto	April 25, 2004
As she reaches climax, her son Kazuhiko opens her door and finds her with toys occupying each of her holes. Misako tries everything to cover it up, but her son refuses and instead gives her a deal that she cannot refuse: "if you do as I say, I will not tell dad." Having no other way out of the situation, she agrees with her son's request. Although she refuses the lustful temptations, little by little her body craves for more!
3	"The Lust Cry"; Transliteration: "Yogari Naki" (Japanese: よがり泣き)	Kan Fukumoto	December 25, 2004
Misako finds out her stepson, Kazuhiko, caused all of the pranks. She does her best to fight off Kazuhiko, but it's already too late for her. She can no longer go back to an ordinary life. Misako is now Kazuhiko's slave for her lust and passion. The wall of sanity is now torn down, but things are just getting heated up for the next level! There is no stopping now.
4	"Comparing Meat"; Transliteration: "Ure Niku Kurabe" (Japanese: 熟れ肉くらべ)	Shigeki Awai	April 25, 2005
As each day passes, Misako loses her sanity, no longer feeling guilty about betraying her other half. What once was a sin is now a pleasure she cannot live without. She though her secret love affair with her son would be kept under the dark, but things take a big turn. What surprising actions will Kazuhiko take to fulfill his lust? How will Misako deal with it?
5	"Slutty Stepmom"; Transliteration: "Fushidarana Gibo" (Japanese: ふしだらな義母)	Shigeki Awai	June 25, 2005
Misako was in shock when she saw her stepson Kazuhiko engaging in a sexual act with her sister Emiko. Having been surprised by this incident, Misako found herself feeling jealous and begins to devise a plan to win Kazuhiko back. What obstacles Misako overcome to get the lust she desires?
6	"Immoral Tears"; Transliteration: "Kinki no Aegi, Haitoku no Namida" (Japanese: 禁忌の喘ぎ、背徳の泪)	Shigeki Awai	November 25, 2005
Kazuhiko continues the sexual rendezvous with his step-mother’s sis, his aunt, Emiko. Now his step-mother Misako’s jealousy grows by the second. She soon realizes that she no longer needs her husband Yosuke. Instead, the one she truly desires both mentally and physically is Kazuhiko, however she only has a few days to make a decision whether to be his lover or go back to being a normal family.

==== Special edition ====
A 120-minute special edition of the 6 OVAs called "The BEST" went on sale on September 25, 2006. It was released exclusively in Japan and presents an extended ending as a special feature.

== Reception ==
Chris Beveridge from Mania.com reviewed every single episode of the series. In general terms, he described the series as having "solid animation and really attractive character designs." He also praised the well-crafted script, which maintains a strong hold on the viewer with its plot twists. Despite losing rhythm in some episodes, it ultimately recaptures the viewer's interest by the end.

== Awards ==
=== AVN Awards ===
Taboo Charming Mother received two nominations at the AVN Awards for the episodes Comparing Meat and Immoral Tears. It lost to PornoMation 2 and Night When Evil Falls, Vol. 1, respectively.

Year	Category	OVA	Result	Ref.
2007	Best Animated Release	Taboo Charming Mother 4: Comparing Meat	Nominated	
2009	Best Animated Release	Taboo Charming Mother 6: Immoral Tears	Nominated	
