= Eushully =

Japanese eroge studio

- Type: Limited Company (incorporated as Eukleia)
- Industry: Video games
- Founded: Sapporo, Hokkaidō, Japan (2005)
- Headquarters: Sapporo, Hokkaidō, Japan
- Key people: Yukihiro Fujiwara, Director/"Foreman"
- Products: Mine Fukaki Se ni Tayutau Uta; Ikusa Megami (See complete products listing.)
- Number of employees: At least 9
- Website: www.eukleia.co.jp/eushully

Eushully (エウシュリー, Eushurī) is a Japanese eroge studio based in Sapporo, Hokkaidō. Games produced by the studio often reach high positions on Japanese sales charts, even gaining the top rank among eroge, but as of 2019, none have been officially released outside Japan.

== History ==
Eushully was organised in 1998 as a development team within Arkham Products. In March 2005, the members of the team made the decision to incorporate as the limited company Eukleia under the direction of Yukihiro Fujiwara.

The company mainly produces JRPG themed games with their most famous franchise being Ikusa Megami.

== Games produced ==
- War Goddess (戦女神, Ikusa Megami) (Released January 29, 1999)
- Maid in Bunny (めいどいんばに～, Meido in Banī) (Released June 9, 2000)
- Phantom Shogun Princess (幻燐の姫将軍, Genrin no Kishōgun) (Released April 27, 2001)
- War Goddess 2: Requiem to Forgotten Memories (戦女神2 ～失われし記憶への鎮魂歌～, Ikusa Megami Tsū: Ushinawareshi Kioku e no Chinkonka) (Released October 25, 2002)
- Phantom Shogun Princess 2: Genealogy of the Guiding Souls (幻燐の姫将軍2 ～導かれし魂の系譜～, Genrin no Kishōgun Tsū: Michibikareshi Tamashii no Keifu) (Released December 19, 2003)
- War Emperor: Sinking into Twilight (空帝戦騎 ～黄昏に沈む楔～, Kūtei Senki: Tasogare ni Shizumu Kusabi) (Released November 26, 2004)
- Slave Princess of Darkness: Slow Ruin in the Blue Coral Forest (冥色の隷姫 ～緩やかに廃滅する青珊瑚の森～, Meishoku no Reiki: Yuruyaka ni Shisuru Aosango no Mori) (Released September 16, 2005)
- Song to the Rapids on Mount Fukaki (峰深き瀬にたゆたう唄, Mine Fukaki Se ni Tayutau Uta) (Released August 25, 2006)
- War Goddess ZERO (戦女神ZERO, Ikusa Megami Zero) (Released June 13, 2008)
- Himegari Dungeon Meister (姫狩りダンジョンマイスター, Himegari Danjon Maisutā) (Released April 24, 2009)
- War Goddess VERITA (戦女神VERITA, Ikusa Megami Verita) (Released April 23, 2010)
- Kamidori Alchemy Meister (神採りアルケミーマイスター, Kamidori Arukemī Maisutā) (Released April 22, 2011)
- Soukoku no Arterial (創刻のアテリアル) (Released April 27, 2012)
- Madou Koukaku ~Yami no Tsuki Megami wa Doukoku de Utau~ (魔導巧殻〜闇の月女神は導国で歌う〜) (Released April 26, 2013)
- La DEA of Libra. War Goddess MEMORIA (天秤のLa DEA。戦女神MEMORIA, Tenbin no La Dea. Ikusa Megami Memoria) (Released April 25, 2014)
- Rhapsody of God (神のラプソディ, Kami no Rhapsody) (Released April 24, 2015)
- Sankai Ou no Yubiwa (珊海王の円環) (Released April 28, 2016)
- Amayui Castle Meister (天結いキャッスルマイスター) (Released May 26, 2017)
- Sealed Grasesta (封緘のグラセスタ) (Released November 30, 2018)
- Amayui Labyrinth Meister (天結いラビリンスマイスター) (Released May 28, 2021)

== Reviews and criticism ==
The studio's first game, War Goddess, met with primarily neutral or somewhat negative reviews, due to technical issues, repetitive music, and the story, which was regarded as mediocre at best. Some sources cited the original nature of the battle system and well-produced CG images as positive aspects.

War Goddess 2 received fairly positive reviews for its characters and gameplay system, but was criticized as, like its predecessor, having a weak main plot and requiring excessive time to be spent on levelling in order to advance.

Maid in Bunny was praised for its art and Zelda-like gameplay; the most common complaint was of the game being too short.
