= Angel of Darkness (OVA) =

Japanese pornographic anime series

- Cover of the Japanese DVD release of the second story of Angel of Darkness

淫獣教師 (Injū Kyōshi)
- Genre: Gothic horror, dark fantasy (Note: First story), science fiction horror (Note: Second-fourth story)
- Original video animation
- Directed by: Kanenari Tokiwa
- Studio: Pink Pineapple
- Licensed by: NA: SoftCel Pictures (expired)
- Released: 1994
- Runtime: 180 minutes (total)
- Episodes: 4
- Live-action video
- Studio: Critical Mass (expired); Adult Source Media
- Released: 1995
- Runtime: 450 minutes (total)

Angel of Darkness (Japanese: 淫獣教師, Hepburn: Injū Kyōshi) is a four-part Japanese adult animated gothic horror film series released in 1994 by Pink Pineapple in Japan. The film series focuses on tentacle rape and S&M, as well as frequently featuring girl-on-girl scenes, often under circumstances of mind control or possession. It was adapted into a live-action series.

Angel of Darkness was released in North America by ADV Films under their SoftCel Pictures label. The series utilizes tropes of the sci-fi, fantasy, and horror genres within the erotic scenarios it depicts.

== Plot ==
=== First Story ===
In the ancient times, the ancient forest was a magical place by many fairy-like elves and the bearded dwarves, until the arrival of a creature called the "Dark Elemental", an extraterrestrial being ruled by evil appetite and fueled by the human lust, who wreaked havoc on the elves and forest. The elves were eventually able to defeat the Dark Elemental and bury him in the form of a seed, along with a protective stone seal. Over time, however, the influence of humans and deforestation caused the population and power of elves and dwarves to diminish.

In the present day Japan, the human science professor named Goda breaks through a stone seal at the chapel construction site within the new school semester at the prestigious Women's Academy on the same site of the forest, which unleashes the Dark Elemental, who possessing and inhabiting Goda's body for his own use. Sometimes later after the opening ceremony of the academy, Goda plans to use the extract of a young women in order to provide energy source for the another Dark Elemental that he just discovered and seeking out more freshmen at the academy.

Meanwhile in the dining hall, the tomboyish freshman and a lacrosse player named Atsuko Yoshikawa attempts to impress the other freshmen, much to her lover Sayaka Matsumoto's dismay. However, Atsuko's sister and the musical teacher Yuko manages to wake them through her violin playing. While listening to the music, Goda is attacked by the elf named Rom, but he rearranges and reforms his body at will while defending himself. While Atsuko scores at lacrosse practice, Sayaka hears a noise behind the altar, and discovers that noise and light is emanating from the grated basement hatch inside the chapel, causing her describes the strange discovery to Atsuko.

At night, Atsuko and Sayaka enters the basement passageway within the chapel, where they discover a laboratory and shocking to discovered several freshmen being force-feeding their fluid into the another Dark Elemental. However, Goda notices them and unleashes his several tentacles to pursue them. Sayaka escapes the church while Atsuko stays behind to buy her time and evading Goda's tentacles by jumping through a stained glass window to escape before being cornered on a ledge and falling into the forest. Waking up inside the forest, the naked Atsuko being bounded, bitten and wounded cruely by the group of dwarves despites her protest until Rom chases off the dwarves, who have become bound to the Dark Elemental and defend their behavior by explaining that they are subject to the power of the Dark Elemental's desires now that a human has broken the seal and freed it. Rom heals and frees the injured Atsuko, introducing himself and explaining the situation to her that Goda has become the vessel of the Dark Elemental, who must not be allowed to achieve his final form.

Meanwhile, Sayaka goes to her dorm and tells Yuko that Atsuko is in danger, but get abducted by the possessed freshmen led by Goda and taken to the Siren director's laboratory. Atsuko attempts to enter the laboratory again, but the hatch was close tightly, however, Rom fuses with Atsuko, causing her to becomes mascular and stronger. Goda inserts the another Dark Elemental into Yuko's womb and mates with her, causing him mutating into his final form. Atsuko manages to defeat the director, who reveals that she infused her blood with the Dark Elemental's blood, while the dwarves removes the Dark Elemental seeds out of Sayaka and the other freshmen, but Atsuko is overpowered by Goda, who explains that Yuko will become the Dark Elemental like him, the Angel of Darkness and his mate for eternity. However, with the dwarves' assistant, Atsuko uses the lacrosse stick to shoot the rocks into the orb containing the Dark Elemental's blood and manages to kill Goda by destroying the Dark Elemental within his body. Afterwards, Rom removes the Dark Elemental inside Yuko and turns himself into the tree to seal the Dark Elemental away, while Atsuko and the others manage to escape. Rom vows to watch over his people and will see Atsuko again when the human and elves can live together in harmony.

In the post-credits, the director, who survived the laboratory's destruction, becomes the new director at another school semester.

== Characters ==
=== First story ===
Atsuko Yoshikawa (吉川 あつこ, Yoshikawa Atsuko)
Voiced by: Naoko Matsui

A tomboyish college freshman with short blue hair, who behaves similarly to a standard Shonen protagonist. She and Sayaka have dated since high school, and she applied to the academy in order to stay with her, despite barely passing the entrance exam. Atsuko plays lacrosse and enjoys showing off with feats of strength. She is nervous about hiding her relationship with Sayaka from her older sister, Yuko.

Sayaka Matsumoto (松本 さやか, Matsumoto Sayaka)
Voiced by: Sonoko Hosoi

A sweet and intelligent college freshman with long brown hair, Sayaka is more reserved and easily frightened than her girlfriend. She is seen accusing Atsuko of looking at other girls, though she is also shown to potentially have a crush on Yuko.

Yuko Yoshikawa (吉川 ゆうこ, Yoshikawa Yuko)
Voiced by: Minako Arakawa

Yuko is Atsuko's older sister, and a teacher at their school. She has silky dark hair and wears glasses. She is elegant and responsible, and is seen to play the piano and violin.

Professor Goda (郷田-先生, Gōda-sensei)
Voiced by: Shinya Ōtaki

A young science professor at the prestigious Women's Academy who broke a protective seal and was attacked and possessed by the Dark Elemental, an evil ancient tentacled creature. His original personality and motivations are unknown, but under the influence of the Dark Elemental, he is seen to be a sexually sadistic mad scientist, working towards the goal of reaching his final form by using the bodies of young students, and later Yuko.

Siren Director
Voiced by: Yoshino Ohtori

Rom (ロームー, Rōmū)
Voiced by: Takehito Koyasu

=== Second story ===
Haruka Tachibana (橘 はるか, Tachibana Haruka)
Voiced by: Emi Motoi

Reiko Yoshinaga (吉永 レイコ, Yoshinaga Reiko)
Voiced by: Midori Nakazawa

Midori Anzai (アンザイ ミドリ, Anzai Midori)
Voiced by: Miho Yoshida

Professor Shimazaki (島崎-先生, Shimazaki-sensei)
Voiced by: Shinya Ohtaki

Kazuya Matsui (松井 カズヤ, Matsui Kazuya)
Voiced by: Kōsuke Okano

Hiromi Takabe (タカベ ヒロミ, Takabe Hiromi)
Voiced by: Tomoko Kawakami

Ryoko Mamiya (マミヤ 涼子, Mamiya Ryoko)
Voiced by: Misa Watanabe

Minako Yamashina (山科 ミナコ, Yamashina Minako)
Voiced by: Naoko Matsui

== Production ==
Considered soft porn, Angel of Darkness' attempts to merge the magical girl anime formula with the tentacle rape hentai genre. This was done in order to circumvent stringent Japanese censorship laws at the time that did not allow the animation of the pubic region and identifiable genitalia. As such, hentai films began using monsters with phallic tentacles to "rape" women in films.

== Media ==
=== Anime ===
Angel of Darkness series was licensed by ADV Films and released under their Softcel label. All four episodes were released on VHS and DVD with subtitles only.

=== Live-action ===
Angel of Darkness was adapted into five live-action adult films and were released in English by Critical Mass Video.

== Reception ==
Patrick Drazen regards Angel of Darkness as being an example of the use of "horror to express sexual anxiety", and as an example of Gothic fiction. Chris Beveridge regards the hentai to be "neither the best nor the worst" that he had seen, but enjoyed the third episode over the last, as it was more plot-oriented.

== See also ==
- Species (franchise).
