= Dōkyūsei =

1992 video game

- 1995 PC Engine CD cover art

同級生
- Genre: Drama, romance, slice of life
- Video game
- Developer: ELF Corporation
- Publisher: ELF Corporation
- Genre: Dating sim, visual novel
- Platform: PC-98, X68000, FM Towns, PC Engine, MS-DOS, Saturn, Windows, PlayStation 4, Nintendo Switch
- Released: December 17, 1992: JP: December 17, 1992 PC-98; JP: February 10, 1993 X68k; JP: March 23, 1993 FM Towns; JP: November 23, 1995 PCE; JP: 1995 MS-DOS; JP: August 9, 1996 Saturn; JP: August 27, 1999 Windows (updated); JP: May 22, 2008 Windows (with original script); JP: February 26, 2021 Windows (Remake); NA/CHN: April 15, 2022 Windows (Remake); JP: April 18, 2024 PS4, Switch (Remake)
- Original video animation

End of Summer
- Directed by: Kinji Yoshimoto (1–2); Setsuo Takase (3); Shoujirou Okami (4)
- Written by: Sukehiro Tomita
- Music by: Tomas Unit
- Studio: Triple X
- Released: July 8, 1994 – May 12, 1995
- Runtime: 29 minutes
- Episodes: 4
- Original video animation

Dōkyūsei: Climax
- Directed by: Takashi Kobayashi (1); Kan Fukumoto (2)
- Written by: Sukehiro Tomita
- Music by: Tomas Unit
- Studio: Triple X
- Released: December 22, 1995 – March 15, 1996
- Runtime: 30 minutes
- Episodes: 2
- Video game

Jankyusei ~Cosplay ★ Paradise~
- Publisher: ELF Corporation
- Genre: Mahjong
- Platform: Game Boy Color
- Released: JP: April 27, 2001
- Original video animation

Dōkyūsei Remake The Animation
- Directed by: Takashi Nishikawa
- Produced by: Taku Horie; Soapland; Kokage Yoshida
- Written by: Takashi Nishikawa
- Studio: Seven
- Released: July 29, 2022 – January 26, 2024
- Runtime: 31 minutes
- Episodes: 2

Dōkyūsei (同級生; lit. Classmates) is an erotic dating sim visual novel. Originally released in 1992 by ELF Corporation for the PC-98, it became a foundational title in the dating sim genre and spawned a video game series.

A heavily altered 1999 Windows port was the basis of a 2021 remake, which received English and Chinese releases in 2022. A Game Boy Color mahjong game with Dōkyūsei characters, Jankyusei (雀級生), was released in 2001.

== Plot ==
Set in a fictional Japanese town during the final summer vacation before high school graduation, the player controls a male student (default name is Takurou) who has spent the first half of summer working part-time and now has four remaining weeks to create lasting memories. With no fixed linear storyline, the game unfolds across 22 in-game days divided into morning, afternoon, and evening segments, during which the protagonist explores everyday locations such as schools, parks, and city streets. Through player-driven choices, he meets, interacts with, and courts one of fourteen potential romantic partners, while contending with rival suitors and managing limited time, with each branching route culminating in a romantic outcome shaped by the player's initiative and decisions.

== Gameplay ==
Dōkyūsei revolves around wandering through different locations in a town, conversing with whatever character the player happens to meet. To finish the storyline of a particular girl, the main challenge is to learn the times of day when the girl will be in a location.

== Ports and remake ==
Dōkyūsei was ported to FM Towns and X68000 in 1993, PC Engine and MS-DOS in 1995, and Saturn in 1996. A heavily altered Windows version was released in 1999. Another Windows version using the updated art but with the original script was released in 2008.

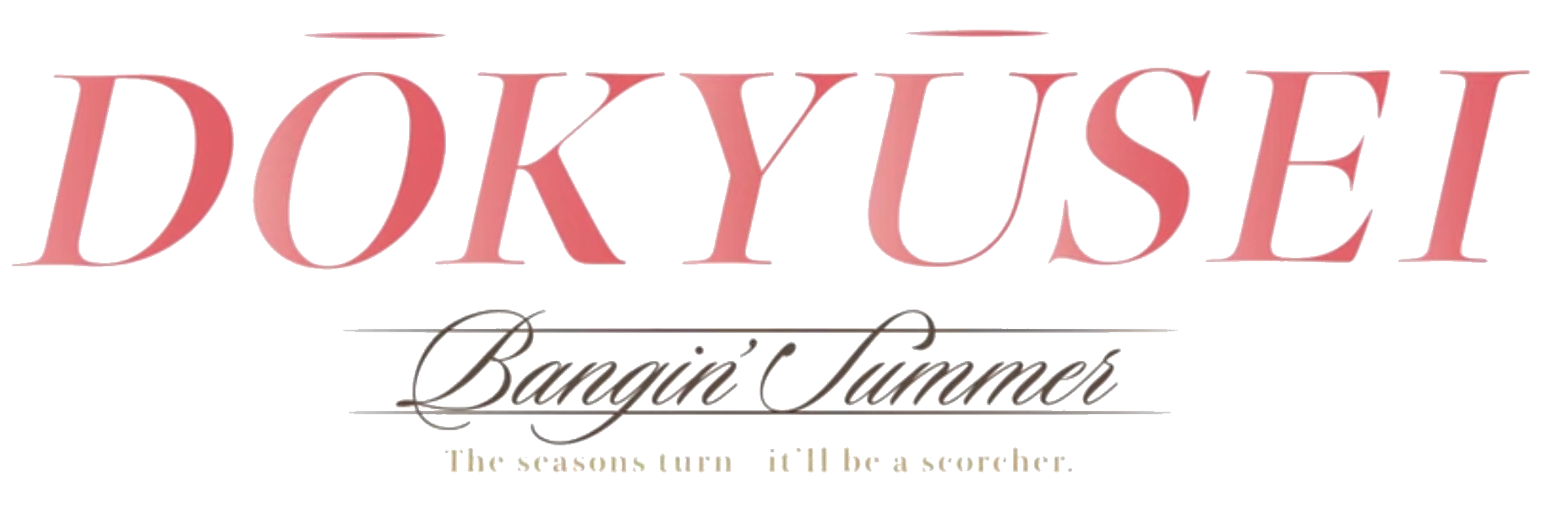
Logo of the English translation of the 2021 remake.

A remake (based on the 1999 Windows version) was released in 2021 in Japan and in 2022 in English and Chinese, as Dōkyūsei: Bangin' Summer. The international version of the remake was developed by the company Shiravune, a subsidiary of DMM Games. Both an all-ages and adult version was released, with the adult version containing erotic scenes and racier dialogue. The remake was ported to PlayStation 4 and Nintendo Switch in Japan in 2024 and later localized outside Japan in 2025.

== OVA ==
There was an OVA series made from Dōkyūsei in 1994–1995, which was originally a 45-minute one-shot, but the original release was expanded into two half-hour episodes, with two more episodes added, for a total four. The first two episodes were released as End of Summer, and episodes three and four were released as End of Summer 2 in the North American market by SoftCel Pictures, an imprint of ADV Films. A two-episode sequel, titled Dōkyūsei Climax Files, was released in 1995–1996.

End of Summer is about a boy who seeks after a redheaded girl named Mai and along the way runs into difficulties (and trysts) with several other girls, namely, Kurumi, Miho, Misa, and Satomi. It was renowned for its romantic attributes and quality of animation. The depth of character development has been reviewed as being above average, although the format forced on it by OVA requires some compromises with realism.

An OVA based on the remake, Dōkyūsei Remake The Animation, was released in 2022 and 2024.

== Reception and legacy ==
Dōkyūsei helped popularise the modern dating sim genre. Jun Maeda, co-founder of visual novel studio Key, credits Dōkyūsei as a pioneer in the nakige ("crying game") genre and as an influence on Key's own such games. Its success is cited by Hideo Kojima for having paved the way for Policenauts. The game started a series, which includes Dōkyūsei 2, Kakyūsei and Kakyūsei 2.

The international version was well received by critics, with Ivanir Ignacchitti of GameBlast commenting on the historical value of the title and Thomas Knight of NookGaming noting that the remake does well at fixing most of the issues that would make the game seem dated.
