= Elven Bride =

Original video animation

エルフの若奥様 (Erufu no Waka Okusama)
- Genre: Comedy, Romance, Fantasy
- Original video animation
- Directed by: Hiroshi Yamakawa
- Studio: AIC
- Released: 1995
- Episodes: 2

Elven Bride (エルフの若奥様, Erufu no Waka Okusama) is a hentai OVA series. It has only 2 episodes.

== Plot ==
Kenji, a human, and Milfa, an elf, decide to get married despite belonging to different species. Kenji discovers that his penis is too big to enter Milfa, due to the difference of sizes between humans and elves. The series explains the efforts they make to overcome this problem.

=== First OVA ===
Kenji and Milfa get married, and are the only ones in the church for the wedding except for the minister, due to a high level of general tension and dislike between humans and elves. Soon, however, Kenji and Milfa find their own problems when Kenji discovers during sexual foreplay that Milfa's vagina is no bigger than a belly-button, thus preventing them from having sex and starting a family together. Kenji, however, hears of the mystical Harpy Ooze, a lubricant that may solve their problems.

Kenji sets off to find the Ooze, reluctantly leaving Milfa alone in the elf-hating human town. Milfa, however, earns the respect of the townspeople after saving two children from a rampaging hydra. Kenji, meanwhile, finds the lair of the Harpies: female, angel-like creatures who are known to abduct and rape young men so as to have children. Kenji is captured by the Harpy Princess, Pisda, who subsequently rapes him. Kenji tries to resist, but is unable to stop himself impregnating her. As a reward, however, Kenji is given a bottle of Harpy Ooze.

=== Second OVA ===
Returning home, Kenji and Milfa attempt to have sex again, this time with different positions, but are still unsuccessful. Milfa decides to visit the local gynecologist, without telling Kenji.

While Kenji is away, Milfa goes to the clinic and meets several other women with similar problems. Kenji, meanwhile, returns home and discovers a dead security guard and a stunningly beautiful young woman who turns out to be his grandmother, Mitsuko, a sorceress who steals men's spirits by having sex with them in order to maintain her youthful appearance, and so did it to the security guard. Mitsuko informs Kenji that Milfa has gone to the clinic, and Kenji panics: the owner of the clinic is the infamous, lecherous incubus, Dr. Perio, who is a former friend of Kenji's. Knowing that Perio will try to rape Milfa, Kenji rushes to her rescue with Mitsuko in tow.

Milfa meets Perio, who immediately begins touching her up and undressing the both of them. However, when Milfa suddenly headbutts Perio, it turns out to have been a hallucination he had been planting in both of their minds for sexual pleasure. Kenji suddenly bursts in, ready to kill Perio, but Perio flees from the treatment room until he is ambushed by Mitsuko, who proceeds to rape him and steal his spirit, subsequently killing him.

Kenji and Milfa return home.

== Reception ==
A review from Mania.com described it as "definitely a show that qualifies as a couples hentai or an easy introduction to the genre, especially for those who don't intend to go much farther but want something a little naughty". Anime News Network called it "a series that's so innocent and frilly it might not appeal to hentai watchers at all, but packs enough ass that it can't be shown to people that look down on porn". THEM Anime Reviews rated it four stars, saying "it's so refreshing to see a title like this in between all the tentacle dregs existing today".
