= Welcome to Pia Carrot!! =

- Genres: Eroge, visual novel
- Developers: Cocktail Soft (home computers); KID (Saturn); Stack
- Publishers: Cocktail Soft (home computers); KID (Saturn); NEC Interchannel
- Platforms: PC-9800 (MS-DOS), PC-FX, Windows, Saturn, Dreamcast, Game Boy Color, PlayStation 2, Game Boy Advance, PlayStation Portable
- First release: Welcome to Pia Carrot!! July 26, 1996
- Latest release: PriPia ~Prince Pia Carrot~; October 23, 2014

- Welcome to Pia Carrot!!
- Dreamcast cover art of Welcome to Pia Carrot!! 3

Pia♥キャロットへようこそ!! (Pia Kyarotto he Yōkoso!!)
- Genre: Romance, Hentai (first 2 series only)
- Original video animation
- Directed by: Katsuma Kanazawa
- Produced by: Osamu Koshinaka; Saburo Omiya
- Written by: Katsuma Kanazawa
- Music by: LUNA
- Studio: Triple X
- Licensed by: NA: NuTech Digital (expired)
- Released: October 24, 1997 – April 24, 1998
- Episodes: 3
- Original video animation

Welcome to Pia Carrot!! 2
- Directed by: Katsuma Kanazawa
- Written by: Yōsei Morino
- Music by: ARIES
- Studio: Triple X
- Licensed by: NA: NuTech Digital (expired)
- Released: October 23, 1998 – April 23, 1999
- Episodes: 3
- Original video animation

Welcome to Pia Carrot!! 2 DX
- Directed by: Yōsei Morino
- Produced by: Osamu Koshinaka; Tarou Miyabe; Masanobu Sumitomo
- Written by: Shigenori Kageyama
- Music by: Kazuya Matsushita
- Studio: Garyū Studio
- Licensed by: NA: Sentai Filmworks
- Released: December 18, 1999 – October 25, 2000
- Runtime: 29–31 minutes
- Episodes: 6
- Anime film

Welcome to Pia Carrot!! -Sayaka's Love Story-
- Directed by: Yuuji Mutou
- Produced by: Masahiko Minami; Yoshikazu Watanabe; Satsuki Watanabe
- Written by: Satoru Nishizono
- Music by: Tomohiro Ookubo
- Studio: IMOVE
- Released: October 19, 2002
- Runtime: 48 minutes

Welcome to Pia Carrot!! (Pia♥キャロットへようこそ!!, Pia Carrot e Youkoso!!) is a Japanese visual novel series by Cocktail Soft (a part of F&C, later F&C FC02). Anime and manga have been based on the games.

The games are all set around restaurants in the fictional "Pia Carrot" chain, and most of the female characters are waitresses at these restaurants. The individual restaurants in the chain are called "1st", "2nd", etc. A maid café named "Pia Carrot" also opened in real life as a cosplay restaurant in Akihabara, Japan.

== List of titles ==
Game titles

Title	Platform	Publisher(s)	Release date
Welcome to Pia Carrot!! (Pia♥キャロットへようこそ!!, Pia Kyarotto he Yōkoso!!)	MS-DOS	Cocktail Soft	July 26, 1996
Welcome to Pia Carrot!! (Pia♥キャロットへようこそ!!, Pia Kyarotto he Yōkoso!!)	Windows	Cocktail Soft	October 18, 1996
Welcome to Pia Carrot!! (Pia♥キャロットへようこそ!!, Pia Kyarotto he Yōkoso!!)	PC-FX	Cocktail Soft	May 23, 1997
Welcome to Pia Carrot!! (Pia♥キャロットへようこそ!!, Pia Kyarotto he Yōkoso!!)	Sega Saturn	KID	March 12, 1998
Welcome to Pia Carrot!! 2 (Pia♥キャロットへようこそ!! 2, Pia Kyarotto he Yōkoso!! 2)	Windows 95	Cocktail Soft	October 31, 1997
Welcome to Pia Carrot!! 2 (Pia♥キャロットへようこそ!! 2, Pia Kyarotto he Yōkoso!! 2)	Sega Saturn	NEC Interchannel	October 8, 1998
Welcome to Pia Carrot!! 2 (Pia♥キャロットへようこそ!! 2, Pia Kyarotto he Yōkoso!! 2)	Windows Me/2000	F&C FC02	October 26, 2001
Welcome to Pia Carrot!! 2 (Pia♥キャロットへようこそ!! 2, Pia Kyarotto he Yōkoso!! 2)	Dreamcast	NEC Interchannel	February 6, 2003
Welcome to Pia Carrot!! 2.2 (Pia♥キャロットへようこそ!! 2.2, Pia Kyarotto he Yōkoso!! 2.2)	Game Boy Color	NEC Interchannel	December 2, 2000
Welcome to Pia Carrot!! 2.5 (Pia♥キャロットへようこそ!! 2.5, Pia Kyarotto he Yōkoso!! 2.5)	Dreamcast	NEC Interchannel	June 21, 2001
Welcome to Pia Carrot!! 3 (Pia♥キャロットへようこそ!! 3, Pia Kyarotto he Yōkoso!! 3)	Windows 95/98/Me/2000	F&C FC02	November 30, 2001
Welcome to Pia Carrot!! 3 (Pia♥キャロットへようこそ!! 3, Pia Kyarotto he Yōkoso!! 3)	Dreamcast	NEC Interchannel	March 27, 2003
Welcome to Pia Carrot!! 3 (Pia♥キャロットへようこそ!! 3, Pia Kyarotto he Yōkoso!! 3)	PlayStation 2	NEC Interchannel	March 27, 2003
Welcome to Pia Carrot!! 3.3 (Pia♥キャロットへようこそ!! 3.3, Pia Kyarotto he Yōkoso!! 3.3)	Game Boy Advance	NEC Interchannel	April 23, 2004
Welcome to Pia Carrot!! G.O. ~Grand Open~	Windows 98/Me/2000/XP	F&C FC02	February 3, 2006
Pia Carrot G.O. TOYBOX ~Summer Fair~	?	?	2006
MahJong in Pia Carrot~	?	?	2007
Welcome to Pia Carrot!! G.P.	?	?	2008
Welcome to Pia Carrot!! 4	PC	F&C	2009
Pia Carrot 4 FD	?	?	2010
PriPia ~Prince Pia Carrot~	?	?	2014

Animation titles

1. Welcome to Pia Carrot!! (1997–1998; 3 episode hentai OVA)
2. Welcome to Pia Carrot!! 2 (1998–1999; 3 episode hentai OVA)
3. Welcome to Pia Carrot!! 2 DX (1999–2000; 6 episode OVA)
4. Welcome to Pia Carrot!! -Sayaka no Koi-monogatari- (Sayaka's Love Story) (2002; movie)

== Welcome to Pia Carrot ==
The first game in the series is called Welcome to Pia Carrot!! and was initially released in 1996 for MS-DOS on the NEC PC-9800 Series and for Windows 3.1. The game was later released for the PC-FX in 1997, and for the Sega Saturn in 1998 by KID.

There is also a hentai OVA with 3 episodes based on this title.

=== Characters ===
Yusuke Kinoshita

Voiced by: Kentaro Ito (Welcome to the Pia Carrot!!!), Masami Kikuchi (Welcome to the Pia Carrot 2)
Yusuke Kinoshita is the protagonist of the Welcome to Pia Carrot. In Welcome to the Pia Carrot 2, he is 2nd's chief, and 3rd's temporary chief in 2.2

Satomi Morihara

Voiced by: Izumi Mito

Shouko Inaba

Voiced by: Minami Nagasaki
Shouko Inaba is the childhood friend of Yusuke.

Reika Kokubo

Voiced by: Hina Hatono

Yukiko Kawai

Voiced by: Hotaru Natsuno

Shiho Kannaduki

Voiced by: Kaori
1st's manager in this title

Yukari Tachibana

Voiced by: Hina Tatono

Saori Imai

Voiced by: Satomi Kodama

Kiyomi Kitagawa

Voiced by: Mebu
Yusuke's cousin

Rumi Kinoshita

Voiced by: Minako Sango
Yusuke's younger sister

Yasuo Kinoshita

Yusuke's father and owner of the Pia Carrot restaurant chain

Kaori Tachibana

Yukari's mother

Saeko Imai

Saori's stepmother

Airi Kashikura

Additional character on Saturn version

=== Staff (Game) ===
- Scenario: Jane Inamura (Ryuichi Inamura)
- Original Picture: Tatsuki Amaduyu, CHARM, Nak-Mura (Takeshi Nakamura), Yukihiro Matsuo (additional character on Saturn version)
- Music: Tomohiro Takatsuka (except Saturn), Juri Goto (Saturn only)
  - Opening for PC-FX Version: Ko Ku Ha Ku
  - :Lyrics: Yukie Sugawara
  - :Music: Yukie Sugawara
  - Insert on Saturn Version: Miracle Sunshine
  - :Lyrics: Juri Goto
  - :Music: Juri Goto
  - :Vocal: Megumi Miduki
  - :Voice Actors:Izumi Mito as Satomi Morihara, Minami Nagasaki as Shoko Inaba, Hina Hatono as Reika Kokubo/Yukari Tachibana, Hotaru Natsuno as Yukiko Kawai, Kaori as Shiho Kannazuki, Satomi Kodama as Saori Imai, Mebu as Kiyomi Kitagawa, Akane Yoshino as Airi Kashikura

== Welcome to Pia Carrot!! 2/2.2/2.5 ==
Welcome to Pia Carrot 2 is the first true sequel to "Pia Carrot", set four years later than the first game. The original version (released in 1997) was for Windows 95 and was later released for Sega Saturn (1998 by NEC Interchannel), Windows 2000 (2001 by F&C FC02; this version also runs on Windows 95, 98, 98SE and Me) and the Dreamcast (2003 by NEC Interchannel). The Dreamcast release is the same as the first disc of the previously released "Pia Carrot 2.5". It is well known for its theme song "Go! Go! Waitress".

Two OVAs based on this title were released, the first being an adult title with 3 episodes, and the second ("Welcome to Pia Carrot 2 DX") was an all-age series with 6 episodes. "Welcome to Pia Carrot 2 DX" was licensed by Sentai Filmworks.

Welcome to Pia Carrot!! 2.2 is a branch of "Pia Carrot 2" and is set 4 months after that game. It was released for the Game Boy Color by NEC Interchannel in 2000. Welcome to Pia Carrot!! 2.5 is a combination set of "Pia Carrot 2" and "Pia Carrot 2.2" for the Dreamcast. This pack title contains 2 GD-ROMs.

=== Characters ===
Kouji Maeda

Voiced by: Showtaro Morikubo (Welcome to the Pia Carrot 2), Akira Ishida (Welcome to the Pia Carrot 3)
Protagonist of "Pia Carrot 2" and "Pia Carrot 2.2"

Azusa Hinomori

Voiced by: Ai Uchikawa

Mina Hinomori

Voiced by: Miwa Yanagihara
Azusa's younger sister

Tsukasa Enomoto

Completely transferred to 2nd in 2.2

Ryoko Futaba

Voiced by: Narumi Tsunoda
2nd's manager. Substitute chief because Yuusuke has gone to 3rd in 2.2

Aoi Minase

Voiced by: Miki Narahasji
Ryoko's friend. 3rd's chief waitress in 2.2

Sanae Enishi

Voiced by: Riko Sayama

Mikiko Shinohara

Harue Yamana

Voiced by: Minami Nagasaki

Jun Kagurazaka

Voiced by: Yōko Teppōzuka

Kaoru Yamana

Harue's daughter

Shinji Yano

Kouji's friend and Ryoko's cousin

Tomomi Aizawa

Additional character on the "consumer version" in 2 (Saturn and Dreamcast)

Yuki Kamizuka

Additional character on the "consumer version" in 2

Noriko Shima

Additional character on the "consumer version" in 2

=== Staff ===
2

- Scenario: Ryuichi Inamura
- Original Picture: Tatsuki Amaduyu, Misato Mitsumi, CHARM, Takashi Hashimoto (additional characters on consumer version)
- Music: DOORS MUSIC ENTERTAINMENT
  - Opening: Go! Go! Waitress
  - Ending (consumer version): Iced Tea
  - :Lyrics: Hajime Kanasugi & Bun Yoshida
  - :Music: Bun Yoshida
  - :Vocal: Miyuki Kunitake

2.2

- Scenario: Hideki Shirane
- Character Design: Tatsuki Amaduyu, Misato Mitsumi, CHARM, Takashi Hashimoto
- Original Picture: Junji Goto
- Music: DOORS MUSIC ENTERTAINMENT

== Welcome to Pia Carrot 3/3.3 ==
Welcome to Pia Carrot!! 3 is the second true sequel to "Pia Carrot", set one year later than "Pia Carrot 2", and was released for the PC by F&C FC02 in 2001. Dreamcast and PlayStation 2 versions were released by NEC Interchannel in 2003.

In 2002, the anime movie "Welcome to Pia Carrot -Sayaka no Koi-monogatari-" ("Welcome to Pia Carrot - Sayaka's Love Story") was released, being the first movie based on an eroge.

Welcome to Pia Carrot 3.3 is a branch of "Pia Carrot 3" that is set one year after "Pia Carrot 3". It was released for the Game Boy Advance by NEC Interchannel in 2004.

=== Characters ===
3

Akihiko Kannazuki

Voiced by: Atsushi Kisaichi
Protagonist of "Pia Carrot 3" and "Pia Carrot 3.3", and Shiho's younger brother

Sayaka Takai

Voiced by: Yumi Kakazu

Tomomi Aizawa

Voiced by: Miwa Kouzuki

Akemi Hasegawa

Voiced by: Junko Kusayanagi
4th's temporary chief. 4th's chief in 3.3 (formally inaugurated after "Pia Carrot 3")

Natsuki Iwakura

Voiced by: Michiko Neya
Akemi's friend and 4th's Manager

Miharu Fuyuki

Voiced by: Yuka Imai

Nana Kimishima

Voiced by: Hisayo Mochizuki

Takako Kinoshita

Voiced by: Akiko Kimura

Orie Amano

Voiced by: Yui Horie

Noboru Kinoshita

Takako's nephew

Seiji Motoki

Haruhiko Fuyuki

Miharu's younger brother

Shiho Kannazuki

Akihiko's sister, and now 3rd's chief

Satomi Kinoshita

1st's Manager. She is already married to Yusuke

Yuki Kamizuka

Noriko Shima

Kouji Maeda

Azusa Hinomori

3.3

Mina Hinomori

Tsukasa Enomoto

Chizuru Kinoshita

Shiori Kisaragi

=== Staff ===
3

- Scenario: Ryuichi Inamura
- Original Picture: Takashi Hashimoto, Hiroya Fujimiya, Elan Hasumi, Hiro Suzuhira
- Music: Kennichi Okuma (TWO-FIVE)
  - Opening: Eien no story (The eternal story)
  - :Lyrics: Don Mccow
  - :Music: Kennichi Okuma
  - :Vocal: Miu
  - Ending: Koibito tachi no densetsu (The legend of lovers)
  - :Lyrics: Don Mccow
  - :Music: Kennichi Okuma
  - :Vocal: Miu
  - Ending (additional on consumer version): Happy-End kara hajimeyou
  - :Lyrics: Don Mccow
  - :Music: Kennichi Okuma
  - :Vocal: Miu

3.3

- Scenario: Ryo Masaki
- Character Design: Takashi Hashimoto, Elan Hasumi, Hiro Suzuhira, Kanata Minamino
- Original Picture: Kanata Minamino, Elan Hasumi
- Music: Kennichi Okuma (TWO-FIVE), DOORS MUSIC ENTERTAINMENT

== Welcome to Pia Carrot 4 ==
Welcome to Pia Carrot 4 is the third true sequel to "Pia Carrot", and was released for the PC by Cocktail Soft in 2009. An Xbox 360 port was released on February 24, 2011 and a PlayStation Portable version was released in 2012.

=== Characters ===
- Alice Sakuraba
- Ayaka Kamine
- Misa Hasegawa
- Sayuri Mashiba
- Sora Kitagawa
- Yoshimi Sakuraba
- Yuna Takigawa

== Reception ==
In a 2007 survey of Dengeki G's Magazine readers, Welcome to Pia Carrot G.O. ranked 38th in a list of "the most interesting bishōjo games"; a five-way tie with YU-NO: A girl who chants love at the bound of this world, Tsukihime, Tokimeki Memorial 2, and Happiness!
