= Milk Money (OVA) =

2004 original video animation

乳母 (Uba)
- Genre: Hentai
- Original video animation
- Directed by: Norihiko Nagahama
- Studio: Digital Works
- Licensed by: NA: Media Blasters
- Released: April 9, 2004 – September 9, 2004
- Runtime: 30 minutes per episode
- Episodes: 2

Milk Money (乳母, Uba; lit. "Wet Nurse") is a hentai series featuring a woman named Kyoko who, to relieve herself of the pain of her unsuckled milk after losing her infant son in a fatal car accident, takes a job as a wet nurse, but is quickly fired when it is found out that she has had an inappropriate relationship with one of her clients.

== Overview ==
This hentai anime mainly features Kyoko Sano (a former nanny/tutor) and Toji Ide (a college student) having sexual intercourse and Toji sucking Kyoko's large breasts. It was viewed by critics as being designed to primarily appeal to viewers with a lactation fetish, or otherwise those with a fixation on maternal women with huge breasts. Later on, when Kyouko learns that Touji has "betrayed" his nanny by having sex with her daughter Marika (while Kyouko was masturbating in the shower whilst thinking of Touji), she brutally whips him and they have sex again. Kyouko later murders her own daughter, saying, "Touji is mine", which leads to another torture session and her raping Touji.

In the end, she tortures Touji, leaving him in a cadaverous state and forcing him to drink nothing but her breast milk that she extracts through a machine. Kyoko eventually kills him, but Touji holds no grudge, saying that behind everything she did, he felt an "absolute love". It then views in a small purgatory-like area where Marika, Touji and Shinji Sudo, one of Kyouko's former young clients, are all collectively depicted in the nude and engaged in conversation amongst one another. When some police detectives ask Kyouko if she has seen Touji, she denies it. When the detectives find evidence in Kyouko's backyard, they call her over and question her. The story ends when the scene fades out with Kyouko holding a knife behind her back, implying that she is about to attack or kill the detectives, but their fates are left unknown.

== Characters ==
Kyoko Sano (佐野 恭子, Sano Kyōko)
Voiced by: Sumi Toyama
Kyoko Sano is the main antagonist of Milk Money. Before the series events, she was a loving and normal young woman until one night, she got involved in a horrific car accident which lead to the death of her infant son. With the trauma of losing her baby, she took up a job as a live-in nanny/school tutor, and wet nurse to breast feed other people's children in order to relieve her of her pain and grievance. Later on, she was fired from her position when she was caught doing indecent acts to one of her clients' children. Years later, she is reunited with Toji, a former client of hers who starts an intimate relationship with her and then later on her daughter Marika, much to her chagrin and jealousy. When she learns about Touji and Marika's affair, she punishes Touji by strapping him down to a cross-like object in her underground chamber and whipping him until he complies to her wishes. Later on, after finding out that Marika had forced Touji to cut all contact from her (including blocking his cellphone number from her), the two women have a fallout until Marika tells her to break off her relationship with Touji so that he can have a chance at a normal life to which she tearfully does. This is, however, revealed to be a facade and kills Marika out of jealousy saying that she won't allow something like that to happen and will not let anybody let alone her own daughter to get in the way of her twisted happiness. When she is reunited with Touji, he asks her where Marika is, but she refuses to give him an answer and instead tells him not to keep worrying about her. Once he finally learns about Marika's death and that Kyouko had killed her, Kyouko severely tortures him as punishment for leaving her for Marika and then starves him to death by only feeding him her breast milk. With both Touji and Marika dead, it brings the attention of some police detectives who are investigating the matter. When the detectives find Marika's necklace and the place where she buried Touji and Marika's corpses, they question Kyouko who is holding a knife behind her back, leaving the fates of the detectives as well as Kyouko unknown. It is heavily implied that she had multiple inappropriate relationships with other past clients of hers which possibly had also led to their deaths, including one by the name of Shinji Sudo who she had also killed.

Toji Ide (伊手 冬治, Ide Tōji)
Voiced by: Takashi Umayama
Toji Ide is a college student, who, as a young child, was one of Kyouko's clients and was saddened when he had to see her leave when his mother fired her and kicked her out of his house. As result, he lives in an apartment by himself. Back in his childhood, Touji's parents were often too busy due to their jobs and had turned to Kyouko whenever he was in need of being cared for until his mother found out about their secret relationship which then lead to Kyouko getting fired and kicked out of his house. Years later, when he is suddenly reunited with Kyouko following her estrangement from his life, he takes a liking to feeding on her breast milk and then starts a romantic and sexual relationship with her until he starts a secret affair with her daughter and his classmate Marika behind her back. After Kyouko punishes him in her chamber for this, he agrees not to let it happen again and submits to her orders. When Marika learns about the affair, he decides to permanently cut ties from Kyouko and continue his relationship with Marika. As time passes, however, guilt gets the better of him and goes back to Kyouko when he notices Marika has gone missing. When he finally learns about Marika's death, Kyouko rips his clothes off, breaks his cellphone and physically assaults him in her chamber. In his weakened state, he eventually dies from malnutrition and possibly from the injuries that Kyouko inflicted on him when he was being tortured.

Marika Sano (佐野 真理香, Sano Marika)
Voiced by: Hiroko Fuji
Marija Sano is one of Touji's classmates from college and Kyouko's daughter who finds her mother's nursing job to be quite strange and a bit unnerving. She eventually develops feelings for Touji and has sex with him multiple times behind her mother's back. When she finds out about her mother's affair with Touji, she confronts him at his apartment about it, then convinces him to leave and forget Kyouko for good and start a normal relationship with her instead, prompting them to reconcile and have make up sex. Afterwards, she gives him a teddy bear keychain as a good luck charm, telling him that if her mother tries to seduce him again, to think of her (Marika). When Kyouko finds out that Marika had Touji cut all contact from her, she tries getting through to her mother telling her that her relationship with Touji was abnormal and sickening, and that she should no longer continue her relationship with Touji for both of their sakes. Even though her mother appeared to show remorse for her past actions and agreed to not see Touji anymore, Marika learns too late when Kyouko stabs her to death from behind her neck, revealing that she was lying about her promise and that she won't let anybody or even Marika to intervene.

Shinji Sudo (須藤 信二, Sudō Shinji)
Shinji Sudo is one of Kyouko's former clients/victims who she had killed many years ago. Like Touji and her other young clients, Shinji was also breast-fed by Kyouko when he was a child and possibly had a similar relationship with her when he was still alive and notes that after he died, he (like Touji) held no grudge or hatred against her.
