= F3 (manga) =

Japanese hentai manga

- F³: Frantic, Frustrated & Female
- Cover of the DVD release of F³: Frantic, Frustrated & Female

嘆きの健康優良児 (Nageki no Kenkō Yūryōji)
- Genre: Comedy, Futanari, hentai
- Original video animation
- Directed by: Masakazu Akan
- Written by: Wanyan Aguda
- Studio: AIC
- Licensed by: NA: Critical Mass SoftCel Pictures (original licensee)
- Released: 1994
- Runtime: 90 minutes
- Episodes: 3

F³: Frantic, Frustrated & Female (嘆きの健康優良児, Nageki no Kenkō Yūryōji; lit. The Sorrow of a Perfectly Healthy Girl) is a Japanese hentai manga series by Wanyan Aguda, which debuted in 1988 and spanned 5 volumes. The story centers on a 19-year-old girl named Hiroe Ogawa who has difficulty achieving orgasm. Three original video animations ("OVAs") were produced by AIC and Pink Pineapple and were released in 1994. The OVAs originally released in North America by SoftCel Pictures, a division of ADV Films, and later re-released under the title F3: Ménage À Trois, a reference to group sex. Recently, F³ had been re-licensed by Critical Mass under its original title when ADV Films closed their hentai line.

F³ was followed by two sequels, and their translations into English highlight some of the difficulties faced in translating adult entertainment materials between two countries with very different laws and mores on the subject: in the first 25-minute episode, Hiroe's attempts to achieve orgasm are assisted by her older sister Mayaka, and include an encounter with their mother, Yayoi. In the two sequels, translator's notes insist that Mayaka and Yayoi are actually Hiroe's neighbor and landlady, respectively, whom she just happens to have nicknamed "Sis" and "Mom".

== Main characters ==
- Hiroe Ogawa (小川広恵, Ogawa Hiroe) - The titular girl of the film and is a student at a nearby high school. She tries hard to achieve orgasm with her longtime boyfriend Sumio, but always fails. She usually resorts to hypnosis, masturbation, lesbian sex, and was once possessed by a horny incubus. Her blue hair often gets her mistaken for Ami Mizuno of Sailor Moon fame. Voice Actress: (JP) Yumi Takada/(EN) Amanda Winn Lee, credited as Helen Bed in the original SoftCel dub/Whitney Thompson in the new Critical Mass DVD.
- Mayaka (真弥華) - Hiroe's closest friend/older sister figure (younger of the neighbors) and a resident of the same boarding house that Hiroe lives at. Mayaka always tries to help Hiroe with her "problem" pulling out all the stops. During the first episode, she used hypnosis to help Hiroe achieve orgasm by simply touching her. That plan was later scrubbed for Episode 2. Voice Actress: (JP) Arisa Andō/(EN) Tiffany Grant, credited as Lucy Moralez in the original SoftCel dub/Kelly Benz in the new Critical Mass DVD.
- Yayoi (弥生) - Hiroe and Mayaka's landlord whom they refer to as "mother" and is the owner of the boarding house that the girls reside in. She has a closet full of S & M gear, whips and sexual toys. The kanji in Yayoi's name is the same for the old archaic name of March on the Japanese calendar. Voice Actress: (JP) Miho Yoshida/(EN) Marcy Rae, credited as Verlinda Petme in the original SoftCel dub/Hentai Mona in the new Critical Mass DVD.
- Takami Oide (大出貴美, Oide Takami) - Hiroe's misandronistic classmate from high school and an open lesbian. Takami appeared in episode 2 putting the moves on Hiroe underwater at the pool, then appeared at her house with two other lesbians. Takami also had a crush on Mayaka in episode 2 and was the first victim of rape in episode 3 from an incubus possessing Hiroe's body. Voice Actress: (JP) Masami Toyoshima/ (EN) Bella Pussi in the Critical Mass DVD.
- Sumio (純雄) - Hiroe's boyfriend from high school. Hiroe and Sumio have been going out for a long time and are sexually active when alone. Sumio's not into sports as much as Hiroe is, but he loves to have a good time. Hiroe felt a little pain when she had sexual intercourse with Sumio six months ago, and vowed to finally achieve orgasm with him. Voice Actor: Christopher Bowen in the Critical Mass DVD.

== Minor characters ==
- The Fortune-teller - Appeared in Episode 1. She was referred by Mayaka to help out Hiroe, but upon her reading, she felt spirits possessing her driving her insane with fear and lust. Voice Actress: (EN) Marcy Rae, credited as Verlinda Petme in the original SoftCel dub.
- The Professor - Appeared in Episode 1. He was a researcher at a top Japanese laboratory who was recently working on "The Ultimate Sex Machine" and used Hiroe as a test subject. To his dismay, Hiroe didn't climax and the laboratory was in shambles leaving the professor severely injured in the blast.
- Takami's Friends - Appeared in Episode 2. Neither of them had name but are both lesbians. They ganged up on Hiroe on Takami's command, but were quickly disposed of by Yayoi using rapid-fire anal sex with a leather suit.
- Mia Chigusa 千草魅亜 - Appeared in Episode 3. The 24-hour exorcist who is a futanari. He/She dealt with the incubus trapped in Hiroe's body while Yayoi electrocuted Hiroe with a super-charged vibrator in order to exorcise the demon. The incubus left Hiroe's body and was sealed in a giant rubber blow-up doll.

== Episodes ==
Episode 1
High school student Hiroe becomes depressed that she cannot reach orgasm when she tries masturbating, so Mayaka tries to help her out by performing cunnilingus on Hiroe, but to no avail. Mayaka then resorts to hypnotism, which turns out to be a bit too successful as Hiroe climaxes instantly whenever only Mayaka touches her. However, she is still unable to climax otherwise, so Mayaka tries some other methods, one of then turning out to be a crazy scientist. In the end though, only Mayaka's touch is able to make Hiroe climax.
Episode 2
While on a date with Sumio at a water park, Hiroe is seduced by Takami into helping her get together with Mayaka, who she has a crush on. When Mayaka learns of her trick, she challenges Takami to a sex match, the winner being whoever can make Hiroe climax. They are stopped, however, by the landlady, Yayoi, before she joins in on the fun.
Episode 3
Hiroe is possessed by a perverted incubus who uses her body to rape the other residents. A futanari exorcist named Mia Chigusa is called to exorcise the succubus from Hiroe and trap it in a blow up doll.
