= Dōkyūsei 2 =

1995 video game

- PlayStation cover art
- Genre: Drama, romance, slice of life
- Video game
- Developer: ELF Corporation
- Publisher: ELF Corporation
- Genre: Dating sim, visual novel
- Platform: PC-98, FM Towns, MS-DOS, PC-FX, Super Famicom, Sega Saturn, PlayStation, Windows
- Released: January 31, 1995: JP: January 31, 1995 PC-98; JP: March 31, 1995 FM Towns; JP: 1995 DOS; JP: August 9, 1996 PC-FX; JP: February 1, 1997 Super Famicom; JP: July 11, 1997 Sega Saturn; JP: August 7, 1997 PlayStation; JP: August 29, 1997 Windows; JP: June 28, 2024 Windows (Remake)
- Original video animation
- Directed by: Yōsei Morino
- Produced by: Kazumitsu Takeshima; Yuudai Amachi
- Written by: Shigenori Kageyama
- Music by: Torsten Rasch
- Studio: Arms
- Released: 22 March 1996 – 18 December 1998
- Episodes: 12
- Original video animation

Dōkyūsei 2: Sotsugyōsei
- Directed by: Akio Sakai
- Produced by: Susumu Kaori
- Written by: Akira Momoi
- Music by: Kazuya Matsushita
- Studio: Pink Pineapple; Imagin
- Released: 27 August 1999 – 25 February 2000
- Runtime: 29 minutes
- Episodes: 3

Dōkyūsei 2 (同級生 2) is a video game published by ELF Corporation and the sequel to Dōkyūsei. Dōkyūsei 2 was released in 1995 for PC-98, FM Towns and MS-DOS, in 1996 on PC-FX and in 1997 for Super Famicom, Sega Saturn, PlayStation and Microsoft Windows. A Windows remake was released in 2024.

The player plays the role of a high school male student. In the winter vacation of the last school year (from 22 December to 7 January), he has to choose one girl to be his girlfriend. There are 15 choices for him to make, some are his classmates and some have to be met in the city. The player has to meet the girls and make friends with one of them until the relationship develops to a point that the girl is willing to become his girlfriend.

A 12-episode OVA series adapting Dōkyūsei 2 was released from 1996 to 1998. The Dōkyūsei 2 expansion disk (Nanpa 2 Special), Dōkyūsei 2 SP, was also made into an OVA, this expansion is also referred to as Sotsugyōsei (卒業生, lit. "The Graduate").

== Characters ==
- Yui Narusawa (鳴沢 唯 Narusawa Yui): A girl who calls Ryunosuke "elder brother" (お兄さん, oniisan) and who lives with him.
- Tomomi Mizuno (水野 友美 Mizuno Tomomi): A childhood friend of Ryunosuke.
- Izumi Shinohara (篠原 いずみ Shinohara Izumi): A good friend of Tomomi. Ryunosuke cannot become Tomomi's boyfriend and Izumi's at the same time.
- Yōko Minamikawa (南川 洋子 Minamikawa Yōko): A girl who always quarrels with Ryunosuke.
- Minori Katō (加藤 みのり Katō Minori): A girl who works in a tuckshop called "Hiroko".
- Karen Maijima (舞島 可憐 Maijima Karen): A girl who seldom goes to school since she works as an idol.
- Sakurako Sugimoto (杉本 桜子 Sugimoto Sakurako): A student at High School 88.

The following girls are not classmates of Ryunosuke:

- Kozue Tsuzuki (都築 こずえ Tsuzuki Kozue): A female schoolmate of Ryunosuke, two years his junior.
- Misako Narusawa (鳴沢 美佐子 Narusawa Misako): Yui's mother, she lives with Ryunosuke.
- Misato Nonomura (野々村 美里 Nonomura Misato): A girl who works as a tour guide.
- Azumi Yasuda (安田 愛美 Yasuda Azumi): A girl who is a young baby-sitter.
- Misa Tanaka (田中 美沙 Tanaka Misa): A girl who comes to Ryunosuke's town during vacation, Misa is also a returning character from the first Dōkyūsei, being a fan favorite.
- Sachiko Nagashima (永島 佐知子 Nagashima Sachiko): The owner of the Nagashima hostel in Toji Onsen.
- Kumiko Nagashima (永島 久美子 Nagashima Kumiko): The daughter of Sachiko, she wants to live in the city instead of living in the countryside.
- Mirei Katagiri (片桐 美鈴 Katagiri Mirei): Ryunosuke's teacher at school.

Male characters in the game:

- Aritomo Saionji (西御寺 有友 Saionji Aritomo): One of Ryunosuke's classmates, he is from a rich family, and he is not particularly good friends with Ryunosuke.
- Yoshiki Nagaoka (長岡 芳樹 Nagaoka Yoshiki): Another one of Ryunosuke's classmates.
- Akira Kawajiri (川尻 あきら Kawajiri Akira): A classmate and good friend of Ryunosuke.
- Shinkansen Tendō (天道 新幹線 Tendō Shinkansen): The PE teacher of the 88 high school who always torments his students.
