= Kakyūsei =

Video game and anime series

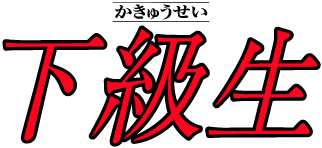

下級生
- Genre: Drama, romance, slice of life
- Video game
- Developer: ELF Corporation
- Publisher: ELF Corporation
- Genre: Dating sim, visual novel
- Platform: PC-98, MS-DOS, Sega Saturn, Microsoft Windows, Mac OS
- Released: June 6, 1996: JP: June 6, 1996 PC-98; JP: March 2, 1997 DOS; JP: April 25, 1997 Saturn; JP: June 26, 1998 Windows; JP: June 23, 2000 Mac OS
- Original video animation

Elf-ban Kakyūsei
- Directed by: Norio Kashima
- Produced by: Saburō Ōmiya
- Written by: Norio Kashima
- Music by: CUE
- Studio: Pink Pineapple
- Licensed by: ADV
- Released: January 24, 1998 – September 25, 1998
- Runtime: 27–29 minutes
- Episodes: 4
- Anime television series
- Directed by: Norio Kashima
- Produced by: Saburō Ōmiya; Takashi Terasaki
- Written by: Shigeru Yanagawa
- Music by: Hiroshi Igarashi; CUE; Ryō Yonemitsu; Masaaki Sainoo; Tarō Todoroki
- Studio: Trans Arts
- Original network: Chiba TV, Sun TV, TV Kanagawa, TV Saitama
- Original run: July 5, 1999 – September 26, 1999
- Episodes: 13 + OVA
- Video game

Kakyūsei 2
- Developer: ELF
- Publisher: ELF
- Genre: Visual novel, dating simulation
- Platform: Microsoft Windows
- Released: JP: August 27, 2004
- Anime television series

Kakyūsei 2
- Directed by: Yōsei Morino
- Produced by: Yasunori Muratake
- Written by: Shigenori Kageyama
- Studio: ARMS
- Original network: Chiba TV, TV Kanagawa, TV Saitama
- Original run: October 1, 2004 – December 24, 2004
- Episodes: 13
- Original video animation

Kakyūsei 2: Anthology
- Directed by: Katsuyoshi Yatabe (ep 1); Haruo Ōgawara (ep 2)
- Studio: Pink Pineapple
- Released: March 24, 2006 – June 23, 2006
- Runtime: 30 minutes
- Episodes: 2
- Original video animation

Kakyūsei 2: Sketchbook
- Directed by: Haruo Ōgawara
- Studio: Pink Pineapple
- Released: May 25, 2007 – June 22, 2007
- Runtime: 30 minutes
- Episodes: 2

Kakyūsei (下級生, Kakyūsei; lit. "Underclassmates") is a dating sim series by ELF Corporation originally created by Masato Hiruta, as a spin-off of the Dōkyūsei series. Kakyūsei was released on PC-98 in 1996, MS-DOS and Sega Saturn in 1997, Microsoft Windows in 1998 and Mac OS in 2000. A sequel, Kakyūsei 2, wss released for Windows in 2004.

An anime OVA based on the first game, Elf-ban Kakyūsei (エルフ版 下級生, Erufuban Kakyūsei; lit. "Elf Version Underclassmates"), was created by Pink Pineapple in 1998. The title distinguishes the anime from the similarly titled but unrelated OVA series of the same title, Kakyūsei, also produced by Pink Pineapple, but earlier, in 1995. It had a TV series produced in 1999, after the success of the OVA. The 14th episode of the TV series was never aired on television. A television series based on Kakyūsei 2 was also released in 1997, as well as 2006–2007 OVA sequels and spin-offs based on Kakyūsei 2, that were considerably more explicit than the TV version.

== Elf-ban Kakyūsei OVA ==
=== Plot ===
The story revolves around Mizuho Yuuki, whose best friend Miko has fallen in love with Tohru. Miko is fairly innocent and comes from a strict background so Mizuho tries not to get in the way of their relationship despite her growing awareness of Tohru who is currently boarding with her family, and accepts going on a date with the wealthy Haruhiko. There is also outside interference from Ai, a younger student in their school, who also likes Tohru.

=== Characters ===
- Mizuho Yuuki - voiced by: Riko Sayama (Japanese) - active with a strong personality, she enjoys playing tennis.
- Miko Kamiyama - voiced by: Miwa Yanagihara (Japanese) - innocent, comes from a strict family background.
- Tohru Nagase - voiced by: Susumu Chiba (Japanese) - popular and well liked, he is currently boarding with Mizuho's family as well as being her class mate.
- Haruhiko Satake - voiced by: Toru Ohkawa (Japanese) - comes from a rich family and has strong feelings for Mizuho.
- Tatsuya Yuuki - voiced by: Hiroko Takemasa (Japanese) - Mizuho's little brother.
- Ai Minamizato - voiced by: Minako Sango (Japanese)
- Mahoko Mochida - voiced by: Ai Uchikawa (Japanese)
- Miyuki Iijima - voiced by: Mie Sonozaki (Japanese)
- Minatsu Yamashita - voiced by: Hiroko Kajimura (Japanese)
- Reiko Shindou - voiced by: Ikumi Nagase (Japanese)
- Nana Minagawa - voiced by: Kanoko Hatamiya (Japanese)
- Minoru Goto - voiced by: Mitsuaki Madono (Japanese)
- Shizuka Mitsuki - voiced by: Rena Yukie (Japanese)
- Mizuho's mother - voiced by: Kumiko Takizawa (Japanese)
- Dogeza Master - voiced by: Yoshio Kawai (Japanese)

== Anime ==
- Elf-ban Kakyūsei (OAV): adaptation of the game
- Kakyūsei (TV): an alternative retelling
- Kakyūsei 2 (TV): an adaptation of Kakyūsei 2 game
- Kakyūsei 2: Anthology (OAV): an alternative retelling of Kakyūsei 2 (TV)
- Kakyūsei 2: Sketchbook (OAV): a spin-off from Kakyūsei 2 (TV) series
