= 1754 Hōreki River incident =

Coordinates: 35.147007°N 136.668607°E

- Location: Nōbi Plain, Gifu Prefecture, Japan
- Date: 1754–1755
- Target: Satsuma Domain samurai
- Attack type: Harassment in forced river improvement order by the Tokugawa bakufu
- Deaths: 85
- Victims: 85 died by disease or by seppuku

The 1754 Horeki River incident (宝暦治水事件, Hōreki Chisui Jiken) was an incident in which the Tokugawa shogunate ordered Satsuma Domain to carry out difficult flood control works in Mino Province near its border with Owari Province in the Chūbu region of Japan during the Hōreki era. Rivers subject to frequent flooding in this area included the Kiso River, Nagara River and Ibi River near Nagoya. Due to the difficulty of the project and due to malicious interference by shogunal authorities to make completion of the project more difficult, this order ultimately resulted in 51 Satsuma samurai committing seppuku, 33 samurai dying from disease and the responsible karō, Hirata Yukie, also committing seppuku. The river improvement project was finally completed in the Meiji period. The incident is also called the Hōreki Age River Improvement Incident and the Nōbi Plain River Improvement Incident.

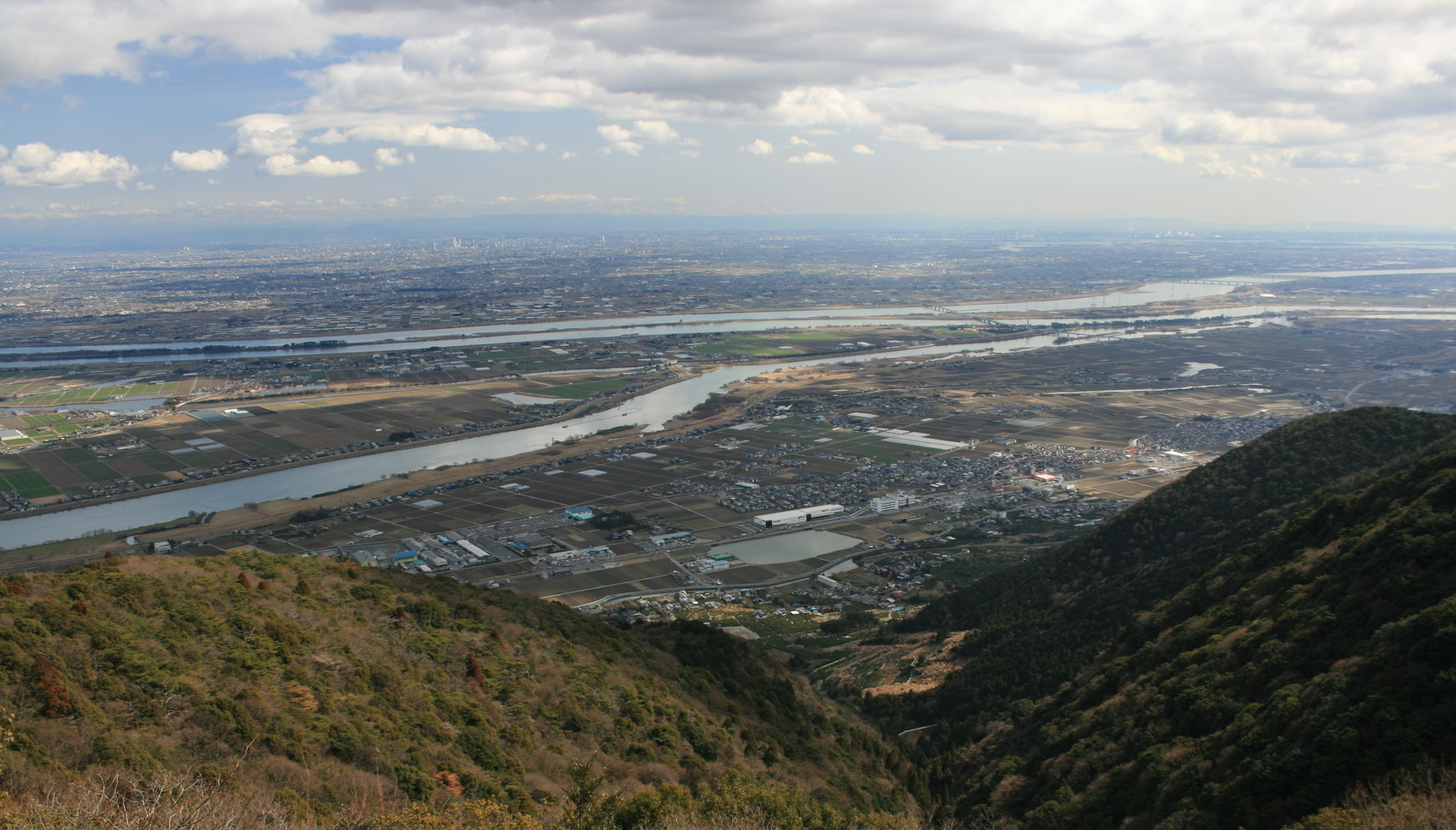
Three Rivers of Nōbi from Mount Tado, From bottom, Ibi River, Nagara River and Kiso River taken in 2010

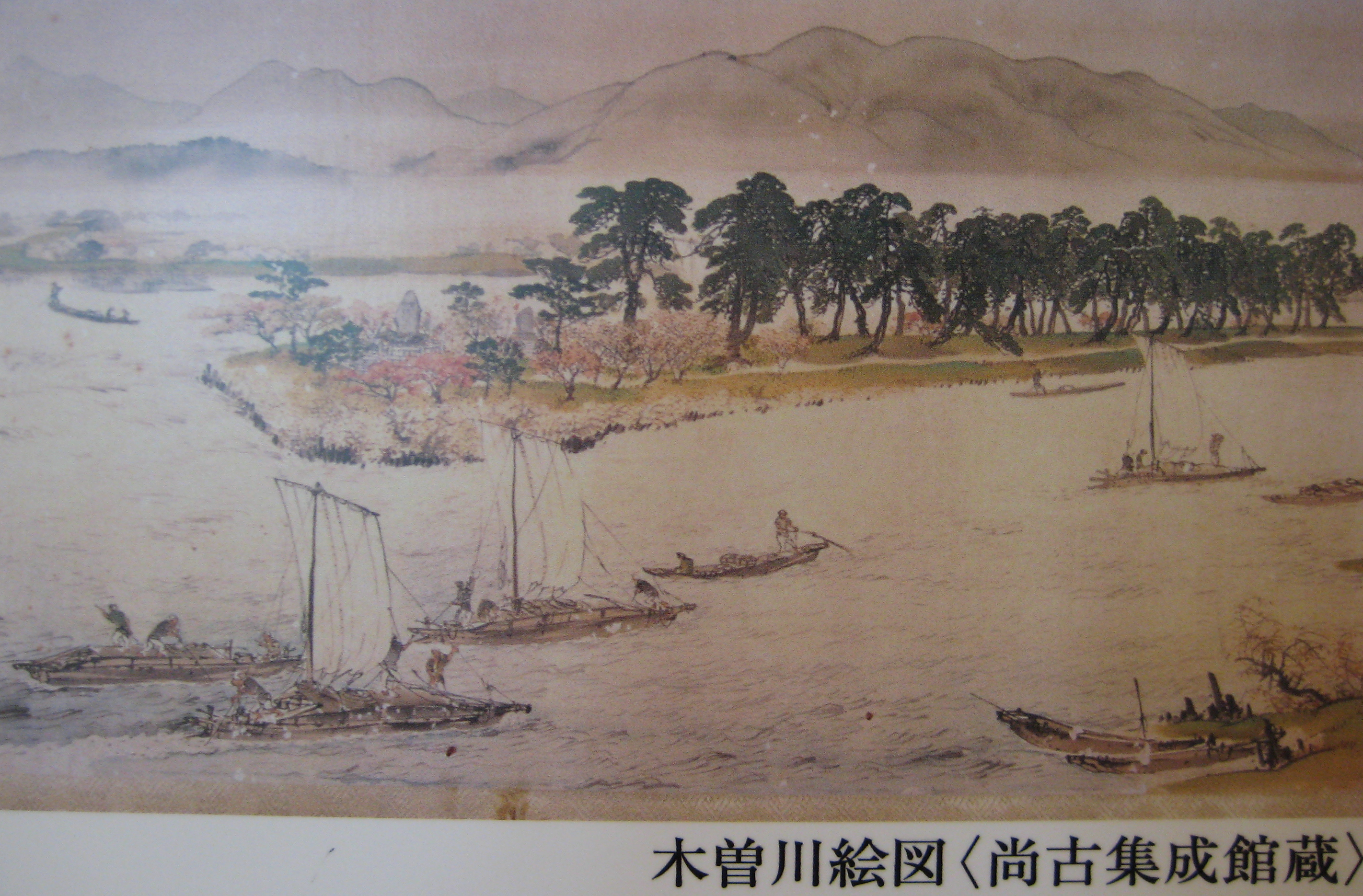
Senbon Matsubara of Horeki River Improvement Incident

== Background ==
The Shimazu clan of Satsuma Domain (present Kagoshima Prefecture) were once virtually independent rulers, and during the Sengoku period controlled nearly all of Kyushu. They opposed the rise of Tokugawa Ieyasu during the Battle of Sekigahara and with the establishment of the Tokugawa shogunate remained a powerful Tozama han which the shogunate continued to view with suspicion. The shogunate often called upon various of its feudal domains to construct public works projects, partly because the expense would help weaken their power and influence.

The plain of Nobi had a number of big rivers with complicated geographical features, resulting in many floods. There was a strict rule that the levee or dike of the river should be lower than the levee of Owari Domain, which was held by one of the main cadet branches of the Tokugawa clan. The division of the rivers into three was originally planned by Izawa Yasobē, the government head of Mino District in 1735, but his plan was not accepted. Instead, the Shōgun Tokugawa Ieshige ordered a river engineering project to be conducted by distant Satsuma Domain, knowing that this would pose a significant financial burden on the domain.

== Summary of the project ==
The formal order (Tetsudai Fushin), a special order from the shogunate such as building a castle and others, was issued to Satsuma daimyō Shimazu Shigetoshi. The karō of the domain, Hirata Yukie (1704–1755) was assigned to supervise the construction, and was assigned 947 people. It was clear from the start of the project that this order was manifestly a harassment of Satsuma by the shogunate and some Satsuma samurai were of the opinion that they should fight instead of complying, but they were overruled. The domain at that time already had debts exceeding 660,000 ryō in gold. Hirata Yukie sent a formal acceptance note on January 21, 1754 and borrowed 70,000 ryō from bankers in Osaka using sugar cane from Amami-Oshima as collateral, and reached Mino on February 9.

A project headquarters was established in a location named Motogoya at the residence of a local gōnō named Kitō Heinai, with an area of 4900 tsubo (about 16,200 square meters), and branch stations were established in four locations. The number of workers would eventually peak at 947 men.

=== Harassment ===
The river improvement works started on February 27. The enmity of the Tokugawa shogunate was obvious because they ordered the dike destroyed three times as it neared completion. Two of the leading samurai involved in the work, Nagayoshi Sobe and Otokawa Sadabuchi, committed seppuku in protest. Hirata deliberately concealed this protest from the shogunate, since it might seem to betray weakness and become an excuse for the attainder of the Shimazu clan. Funds ran out due to the unexpected additional expenses in reconstructing the dikes so many times. For lack of money, the food were restricted to one meal and one bowl of soup, regardless of working conditions. Neighboring peasants were forbidden to sell straw raincoats and straw sandals at a low cost, again attempting to maintain the illusion of a wealthy local economy.

The cost eventually rose to about 400,000 ryō, or more than 30 billion yen. An additional loan of 220,298 ryō was obtained by the domain from Osaka. In August 1754, 157 persons were infected with dysentery, of whom 33 died. The project was abandoned on May 22, 1755. Hirata committed seppuku the following morning for losses that the domain incurred.

=== Completion of River Improvement in the Meiji era ===
Flooding worsened after the completion of the river improvement works. The project was re-engineered with modern technology in the Meiji period under the direction of Johannis de Rijke (1842–1913), a Dutch civil engineer and an advisor to Japanese government.

== Aburajima Embankment National Historic Site ==
When the river was finally divided successfully in 1900, the Horeki Chisuishi (Horeki River Improvement Monument) was erected near the mouth of the rivers, and the Aburajima Embankment was planted with 1000 line trees from Kyushu. In 1938, a Shinto shrine, the Chisui Jinja, was also erected in this area to memorialize the 85 Satsuma samurai who died. The site was designated a National Historic Site of Japan in 1940.

=== Other memorials ===
In the city of Kaizu there is a Horeki Chisui Historic Spot Preservation Society which has planted Kaikozu trees (Erythrina crista-galli), native to the Kagoshima Prefecture. These appear for 35 kilometres (22 mi) along the Nanno-Sekigarara Route. The route was renamed "Satsuma Kaikouzu Street".

In Kagoshima, there is also a monument to the victims and a statue to Hirata Yukie.

Satsuma Gishiden (1977–1982), a gekiga drawn and written by Hiroshi Hirata, is a collection of fictional anecdotes revolving around the incident. The main theme of Satsuma Gishiden is the desperation and stoicism of the Satsuma samurai in the face of their ordeal.

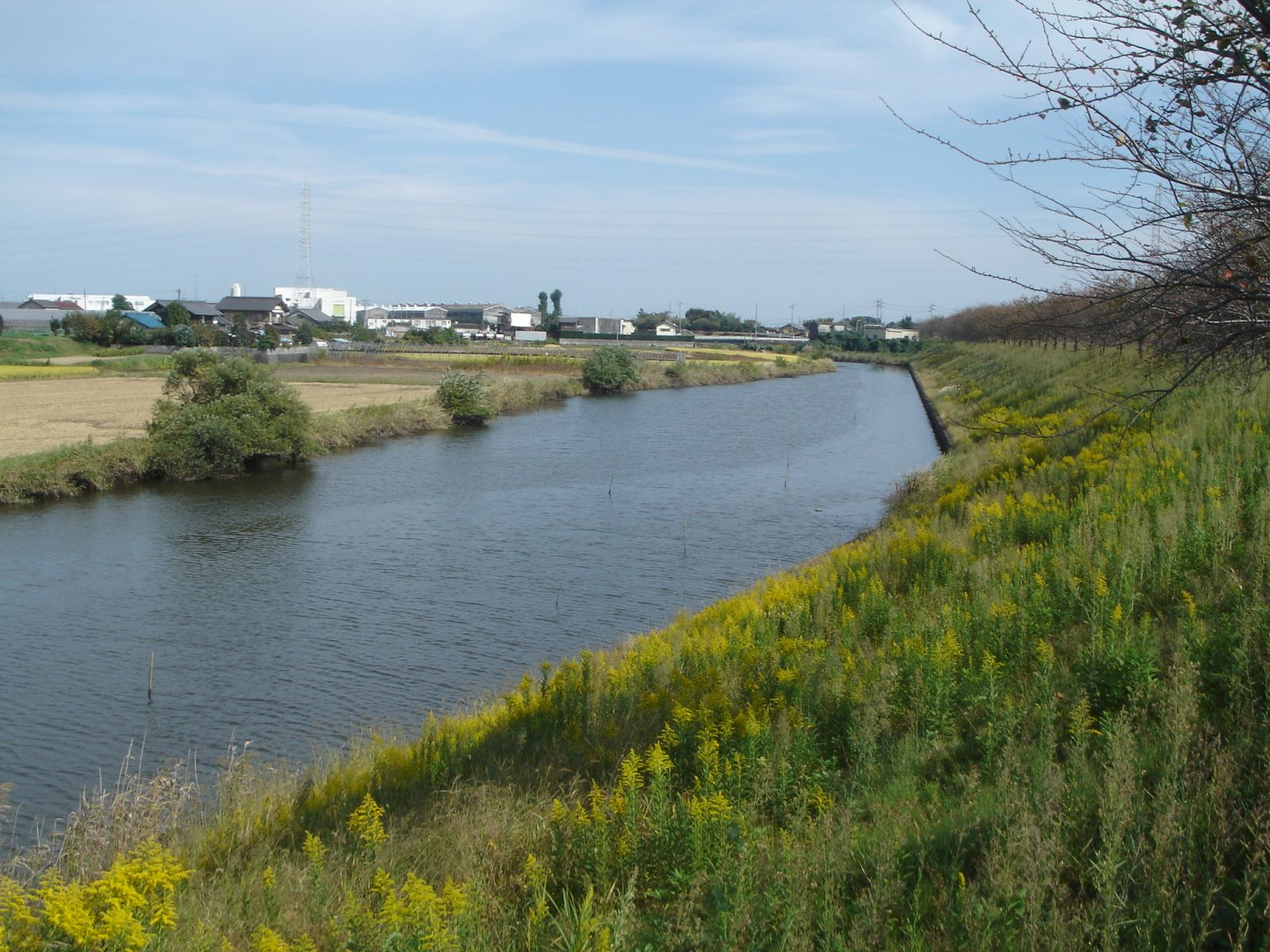
Ōgure River, site of the river improvement incident

== See also ==
- Kitō Heinai
- Wajū
