= Hirata Yukie =

- 平田 靭負
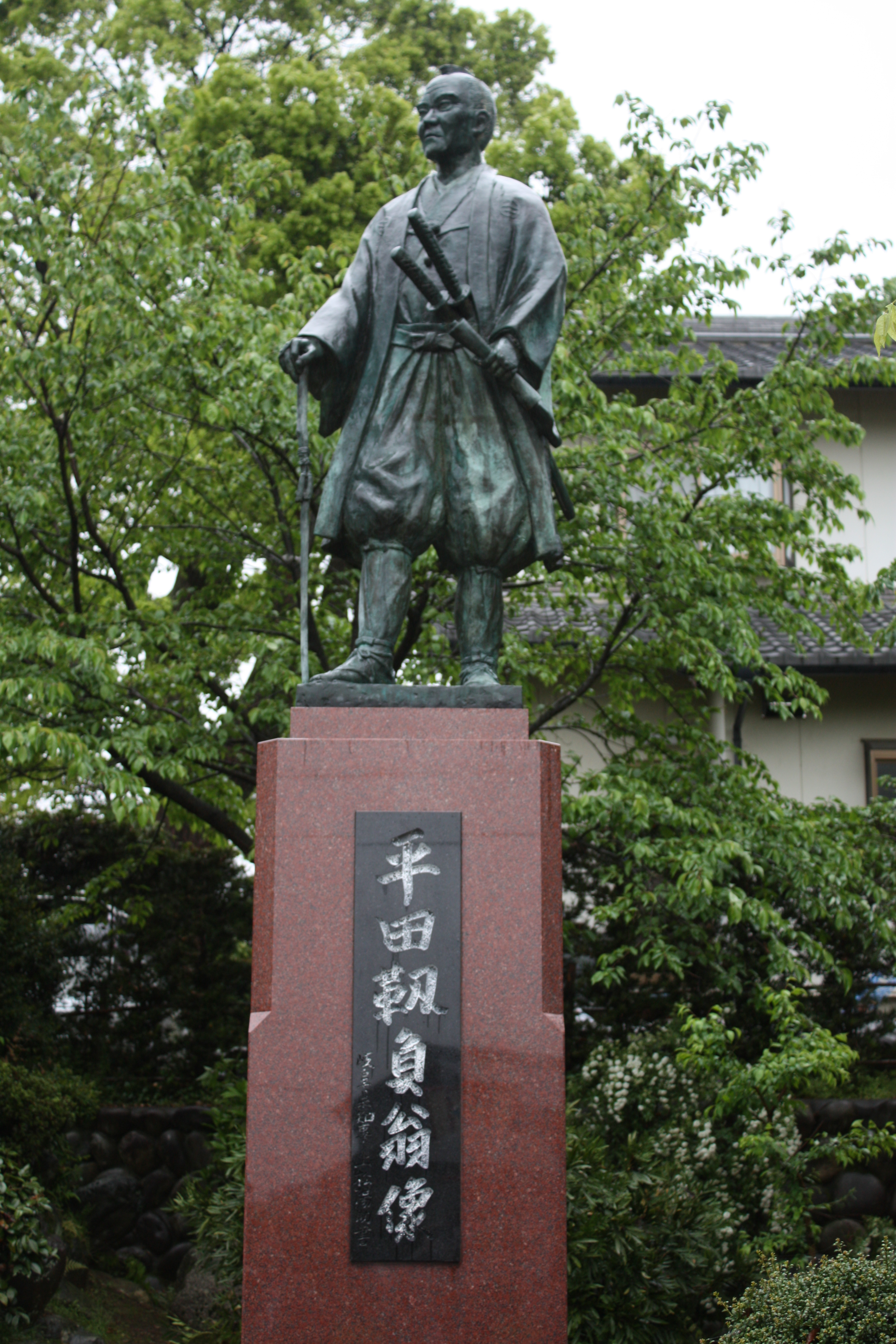
- "Statue of the Venerable Hirata Yukie" (平田靭負翁像, Hirata Yukie Ō zō), in Yōrō, Gifu Prefecture.

Personal details
- Born: September 10, 1704 Satsuma Province
- Died: July 4, 1755 (aged 50) Mino Province

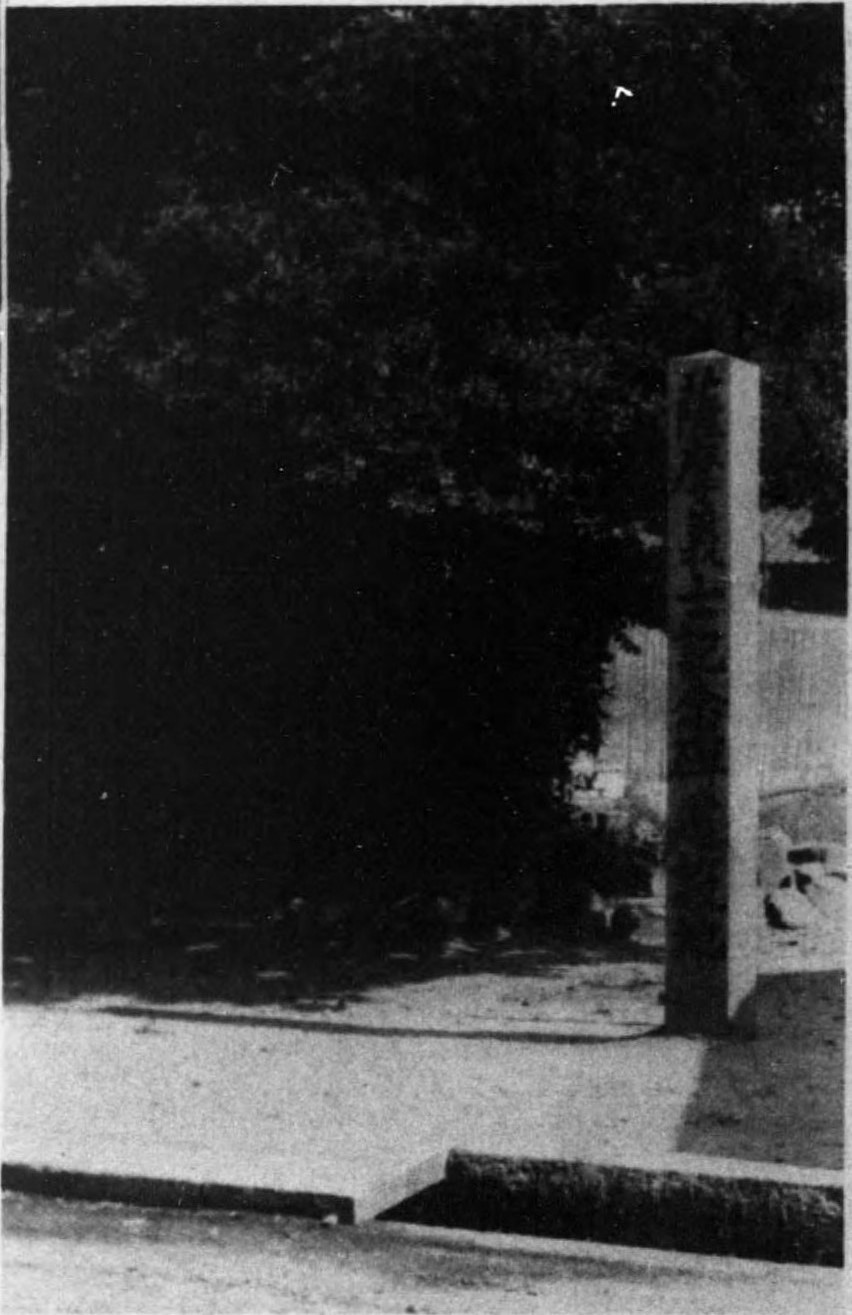
Stele marking the birthplace of Hirata Yukie in Kagoshima, photographed in 1936

Hirata Shinzaemon Yukie (平田 新左衛門 靭負; 1704–1755) was a Japanese karō and samurai retainer of the Satsuma Domain best known for his involvement in the 1754 Hōreki River incident. His courtesy title was Kamon (掃部)

== Biography ==
Hirata Yukie was born in 1704 to the family of Kagoshima samurai Hirata Masafusa (平田正房). In 1729, at the age of 24, he was commissioned as a general officer of ashigaru.

During the 1754 Hōreki River incident, Hirata was appointed by his domainal superiors as the bugyō overseeing engineering and construction work by Satsuma personnel across the numerous wajū. In the course of these labors, many Satsuma men died. Hirata himself died in 1755 after the project was terminated. According to official records he was one of the many victims of dysentery in the course of the incident, but a theory emerged in the late 19th century that he actually performed seppuku to atone for his failure to protect his fellow Satsuma men from the malicious intentions of the shogunate. He was buried at the Daikoku-ji in Fushimi, Kyoto.

After his death, family leadership was taken over by his grandson Hirata Kesajirō (平田 袈裟次郎).

== Commemoration ==
There are a number of statues of Hirata Yukie, in, among other places, Yōrō, Gifu and at the Kaizō-ji (海蔵寺) in Kuwana.

The 1977 semi-historical gekiga Satsuma Gishiden contains a sympathetic depiction of Hirata Yukie, including the folkloric incident of his killing a man with one of his own severed ribs.

== See also ==
- Kitō Heinai
