= Maizuru Castle Park =

Japanese castle

Kōfu Castle
- 甲府城
- Kōfu, Yamanashi Prefecture, Japan
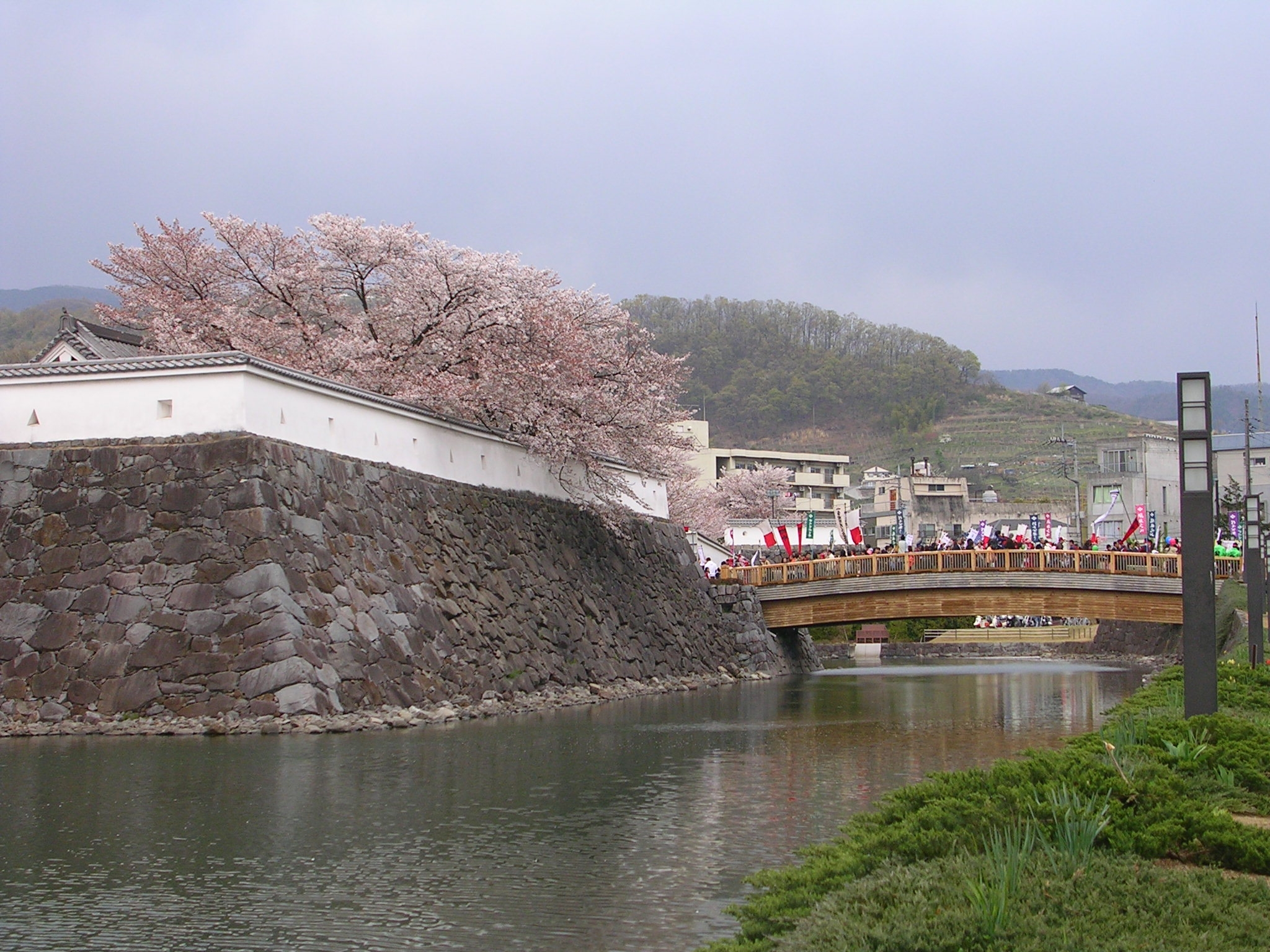
- Kōfu Castle with Cherry Blossoms

Site information
- Type: Hirayama-style castle (平山城)
- Open to the public: yes
- Condition: partially reconstructed

Location
- Kōfu Castle Kōfu Castle (Japan)
- Coordinates: 35°39′55.04″N 138°34′16.82″E

Site history
- Built: 1583
- Built by: Tokugawa shogunate, Hashiba Hidekatsu
- In use: 1583–1871
- Demolished: 1873

Kōfu Castle (甲府城, Kōfu jō) was a Japanese castle located in the city of Kōfu, Yamanashi Prefecture, in the Chubu region of Japan. The site has been protected as a National Historic Site since 2019. The castle is also known as Maizuru Castle, and the present-day surroundings are called Maizuru Castle Park (舞鶴公園, Maizuru-jō Kōen).

== Background ==
Kōfu Castle is located in the physical center of the city of Kōfu on a small hill. The city itself is located at the confluence of the Kamanashi River and the Fuefuki River. During the Sengoku Period after the local warlord (Takeda Shingen) seized control of the province from his father. He made Tsutsujigasaki Castle his seat. Before this time, the Kōfu area was subject to frequent flooding, and it was only through massive flood control projects which were undertaken by Takeda Shigen over a 20-year period that the area was considered inhabitable. After Takeda Shingen's death, his son Takeda Katsuyori was defeated by a coalition of the Oda clan and the Tokugawa clan in 1582. Oda Nobunaga placed his general Kawajiri Hidetaka in charge of Kai Province, but Nobunaga was assassinated only three months later and vengeful former Takeda clan retainers assassinated Kawajiri soon afterwards. The vacant province was fought over by Tokugawa Ieyasu and the Late Hōjō clan, with Ieyasu emerging victorious. However, after the 1590 Siege of Odawara, Toyotomi Hideyoshi forced Ieyasu to exchange his holdings for new territories in the Kantō region and gave Kai Province to his retainer Kato Mitsuyasu (1537–1593).

Kato originally governed from the old Tsutsujigasaki palace, but as that site had minimal defenses and had little room for expansion, he began work on a new castle at Ichijyomodoriyama, a small hill a short distance away, which had a small fort guarding the valley. This was later called "Kōfu Castle". He died before the completion of the new castle, and was succeeded by Asano Nagamasa (1547–1611), Hideyoshi's step-brother-in-law. Asano completed the castle in 1593.

== Layout ==
Kōfu Castle was originally T-shaped, with the main body spreading on the ridge of the hill from east-to-west, separated into three or four layers of terraces over a 200 by 100 meters area. The front of the castle protruded north-to-south and had the main gate. The inner bailey was at the top of the hill measuring 100 by 50 meters, with a four-story tenshu painted black with gold-colored roof tiles. Below the inner bailey were several enclosures with a complex system of stone walls, in some places up to 15 meters in height.

== Later history ==
After the Battle of Sekigahara, Kōfu Castle came into the hands of the Tokugawa clan with whom it remained until the end of the Tokugawa shogunate. The Tokugawa shogunate initially used Kōfu Castle as a stronghold that the shōgun could retreat to, should any enemies take Edo Castle. Although the tenshu constructed by Asano Nagamasa had fallen into ruin and was not replaced, the castle itself was kept in good repair and was ruled by a cadet branch of the clan.

Tokugawa Tsunatoyo, the daimyō of Kōfu, became the heir of the fifth Shōgun Tokugawa Tsunayoshi and moved to Edo Castle. He was replaced in 1704 by Yanagisawa Yoshiyasu, one of Tokugawa Tsunayoshi's closest retainers. Yanagisawa Yoshiyasu was also a descendant of the Takeda clan, and made strong efforts for restoring the prosperity of the region. However, his son Yanagisawa Yoshisato was transferred to Yamato Kōriyama Domain, and Kai province became tenryō territory ruled directly by the shogunate though an appointed hatamoto administrator. During this period, the honmaru of the palace and the Akagenenmon gate were destroyed by a large fire in 1727.

During the Boshin War of the Meiji restoration, Katsu Kaishū dispatched the Shinsengumi under Kondo Isami to seize Kōfu Castle before it could fall into the hands of the advancing Imperial army. However, the Imperial army led by Itagaki Taisuke reached Kōfu first and took the castle without a fight. The Imperial Army then defeated the Shinsengumi at the Battle of Katsunuma to keep the castle.

At the start of the Meiji period, the castle was abandoned, and in 1877 in accordance with government orders that all old fortifications were to be destroyed, all of the remaining castle structures were pulled down. The outer areas of the castle became the location of Kōfu Station, and other areas were occupied by government offices. In 1904 the area around the inner bailey was opened to the public as Maizuru Castle Park. Since the 1990s, archaeological excavations and reconstruction of the important castle features have been ongoing, and reconstructions of the gate and a yagura tower were completed in 2004. The tower functions as a museum that features many artifacts from the castle's original buildings.

The castle is a ten-minute walk from Kōfu Station on the JR East Chūō Main Line.

== Gallery ==
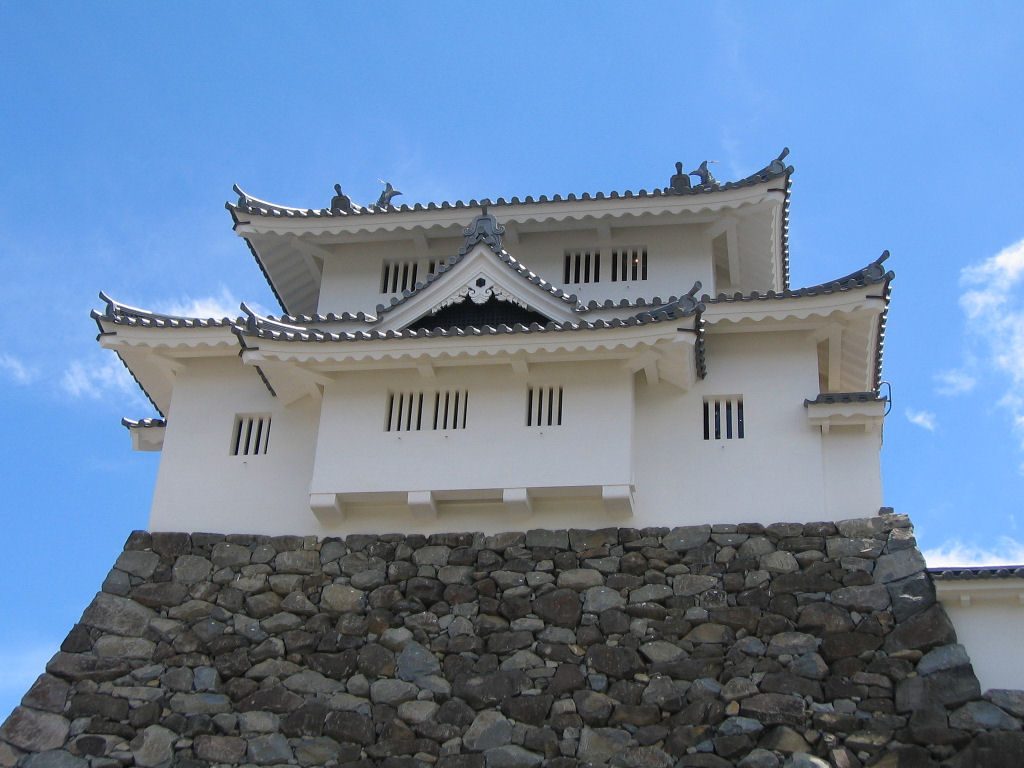
Inari yagura (reconstruction)

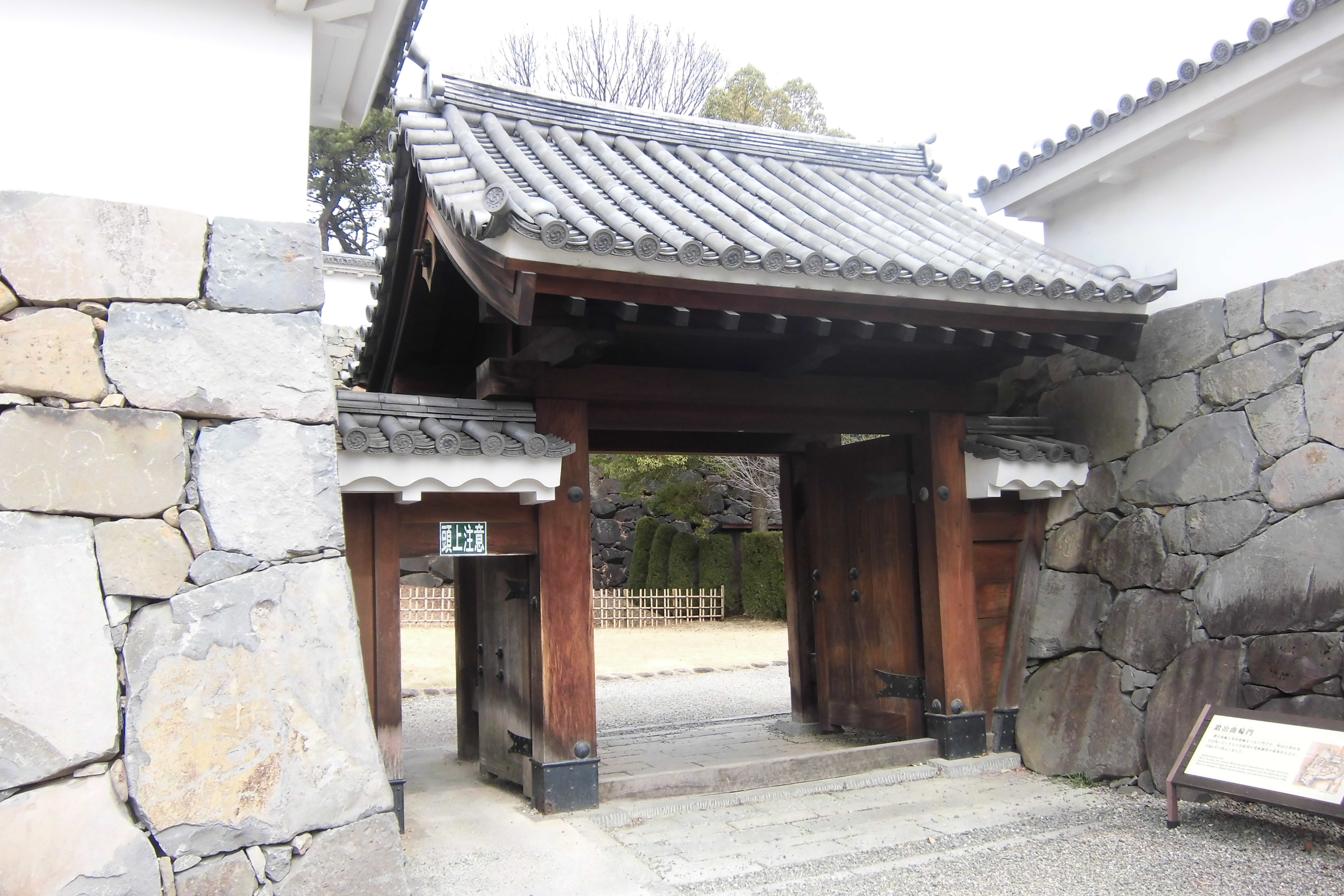
Kajikuruwa Gate (reconstruction)

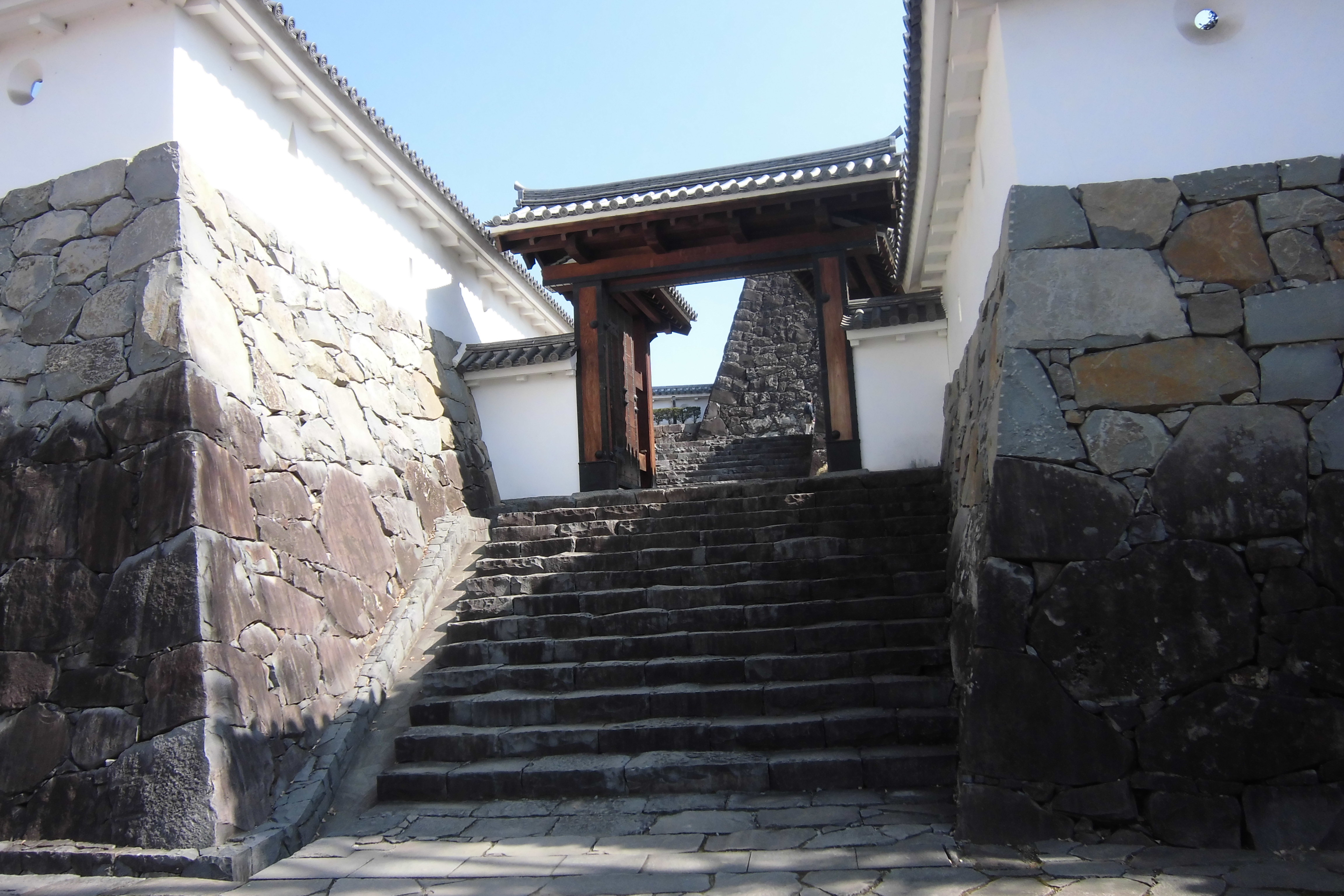
Uchimatsukage Gate (reconstruction)

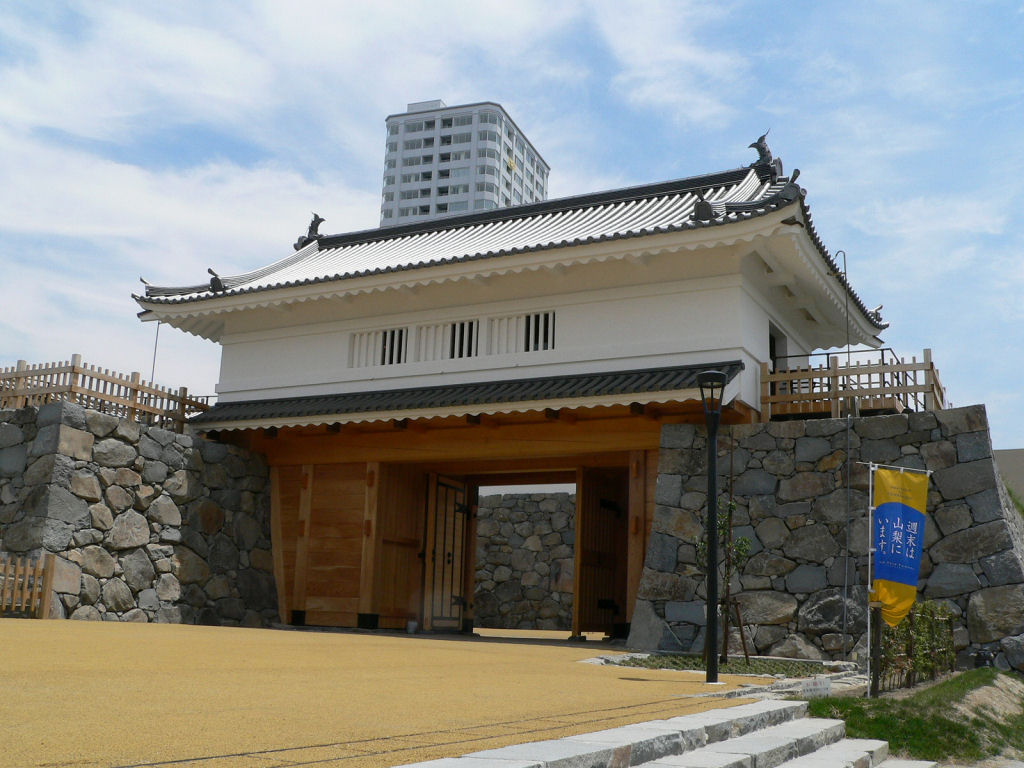
Yamanote Gate（(reconstruction)

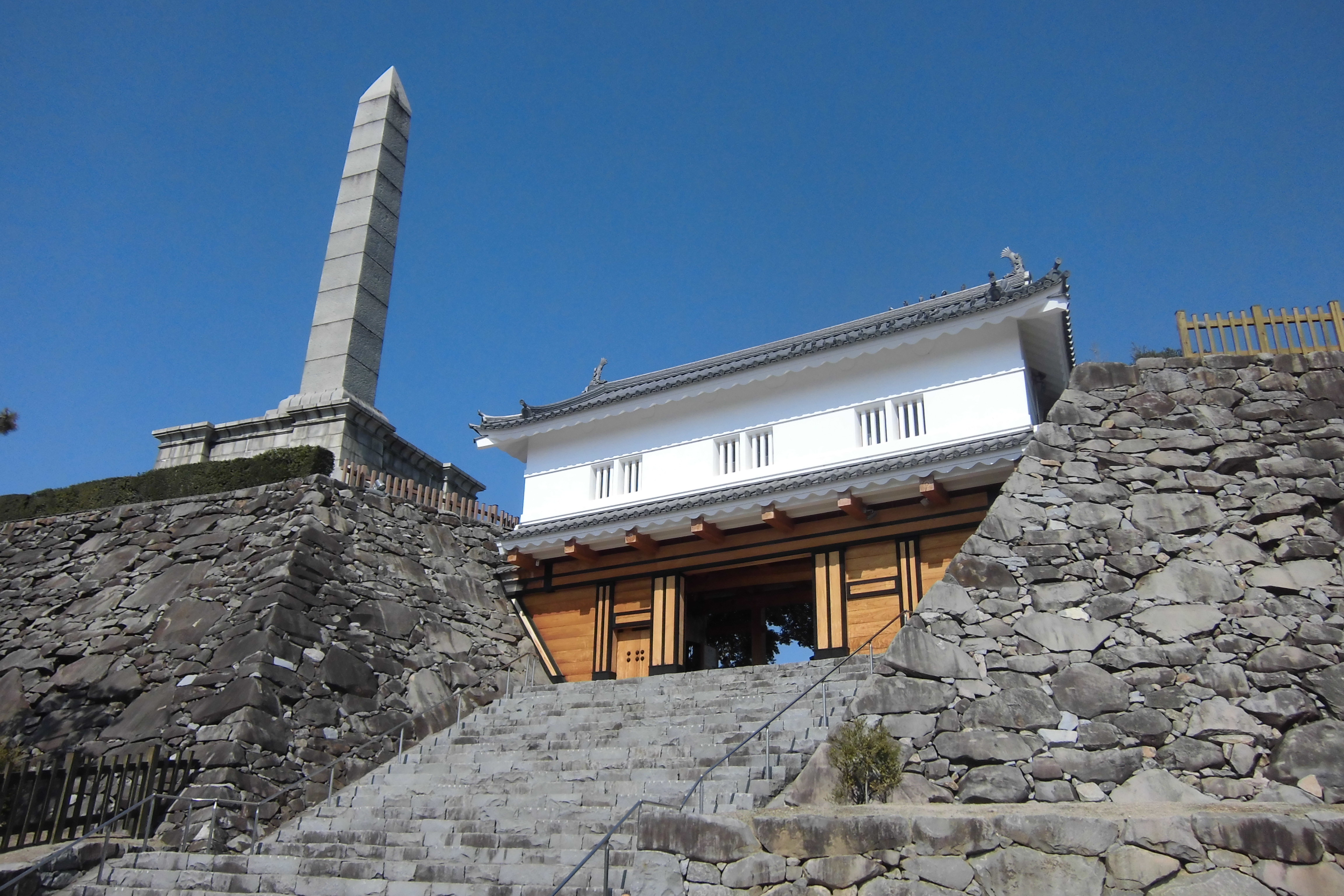
Kurogane Gate (reconstruction)

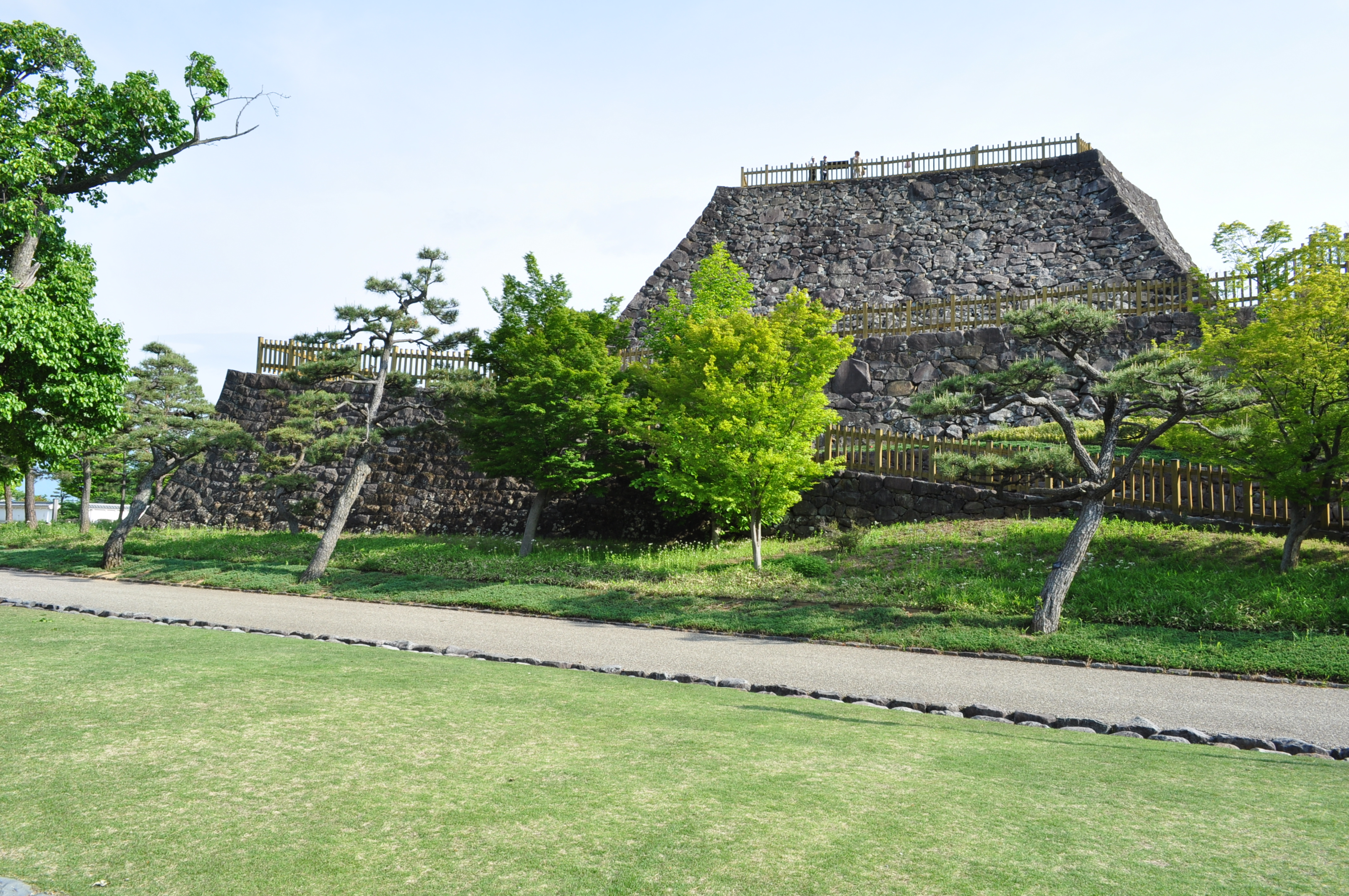
Base of the Tenshu

== See also ==
- List of Historic Sites of Japan (Yamanashi)

== Literature ==
- Benesch, Oleg and Ran Zwigenberg (2019). Japan's Castles: Citadels of Modernity in War and Peace. Cambridge: Cambridge University Press. p. 374. ISBN 9781108481946.
- De Lange, William (2021). An Encyclopedia of Japanese Castles. Groningen: Toyo Press. p. 600. ISBN 978-9492722300.
- Schmorleitz, Morton S. (1974). Castles in Japan. Tokyo: Charles E. Tuttle Co. pp. 144–145. ISBN 0-8048-1102-4.
- Motoo, Hinago (1986). Japanese Castles. Tokyo: Kodansha. p. 200 pages. ISBN 0-87011-766-1.
- Mitchelhill, Jennifer (2004). Castles of the Samurai: Power and Beauty. Tokyo: Kodansha. p. 112 pages. ISBN 4-7700-2954-3.
- Turnbull, Stephen (2003). Japanese Castles 1540–1640. Osprey Publishing. p. 64 pages. ISBN 1-84176-429-9.
