= Gono =

Gono may refer to:

== People ==
- Akihiro Gono (born 1974), Japanese mixed martial artist
- Gideon Gono (born 1959), Governor of the Reserve Bank of Zimbabwe
- Matt Gono (born 1996), American American football player
- Miroslav Gono (born 2000), Slovak football player

== Other ==
- Gono University
- Gonō Line, Japan
- Gōnō
