= Niigata City History Museum =

Niigata City History Museum (MINATOPIA)
- 新潟市歴史博物館 （みなとぴあ）
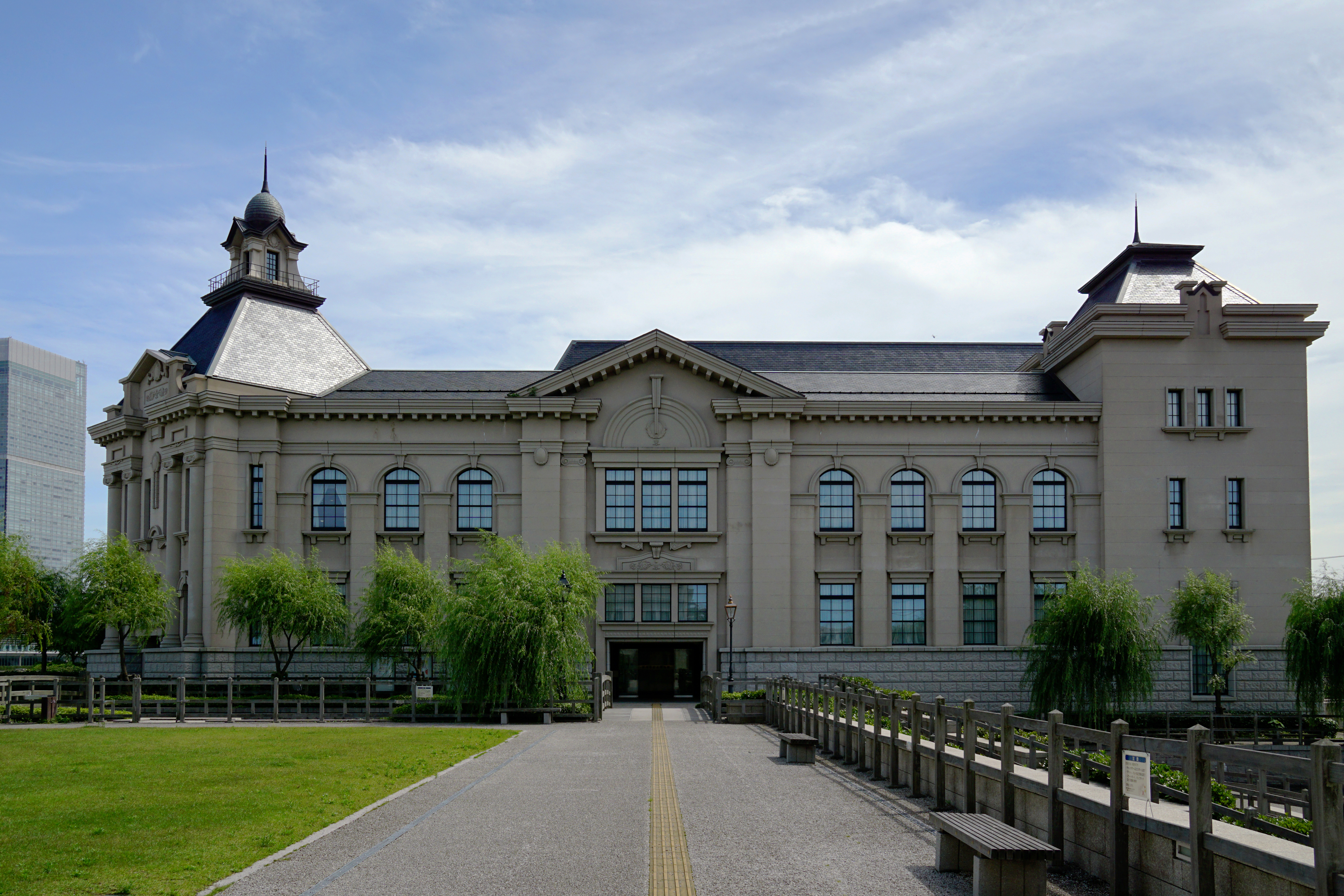

General information
- Location: 2-10 Yanagishimachō, Chūō-ku, Niigata, Niigata Prefecture, Japan
- Coordinates: 37°55′47.4″N 139°3′27.8″E
- Opened: 27 March 2004

Website
- www.nchm.jp/contents15_english/15index.html

Niigata City History Museum (新潟市歴史博物館, Niigatashi Rekishi Hakubutsukan) is a museum in Chūō-ku, Niigata, Japan. It is also called MINATOPIA (みなとぴあ).

== Access ==
=== Transit bus ===
There is a Niigata City Loop Bus stop ' Rekishi Hakubutsukan mae (歴史博物館前)' near the museum.

There is another bus stop ' Minatomachi-dori Ninochō (湊町通二の町)', 8 minutes' walk away from the museum. Transit bus operated by Niigata Kotsu C70 (line: C7) runs from Niigata Station Bus Terminal.

=== Water Shuttle ===
- Shinanogawa Water Shuttle: MINATOPIA

== See also ==
- Former Niigata Customs House - a building located on the grounds
- Northern Culture Museum
