= Former Niigata Customs House =

- 旧新潟税関
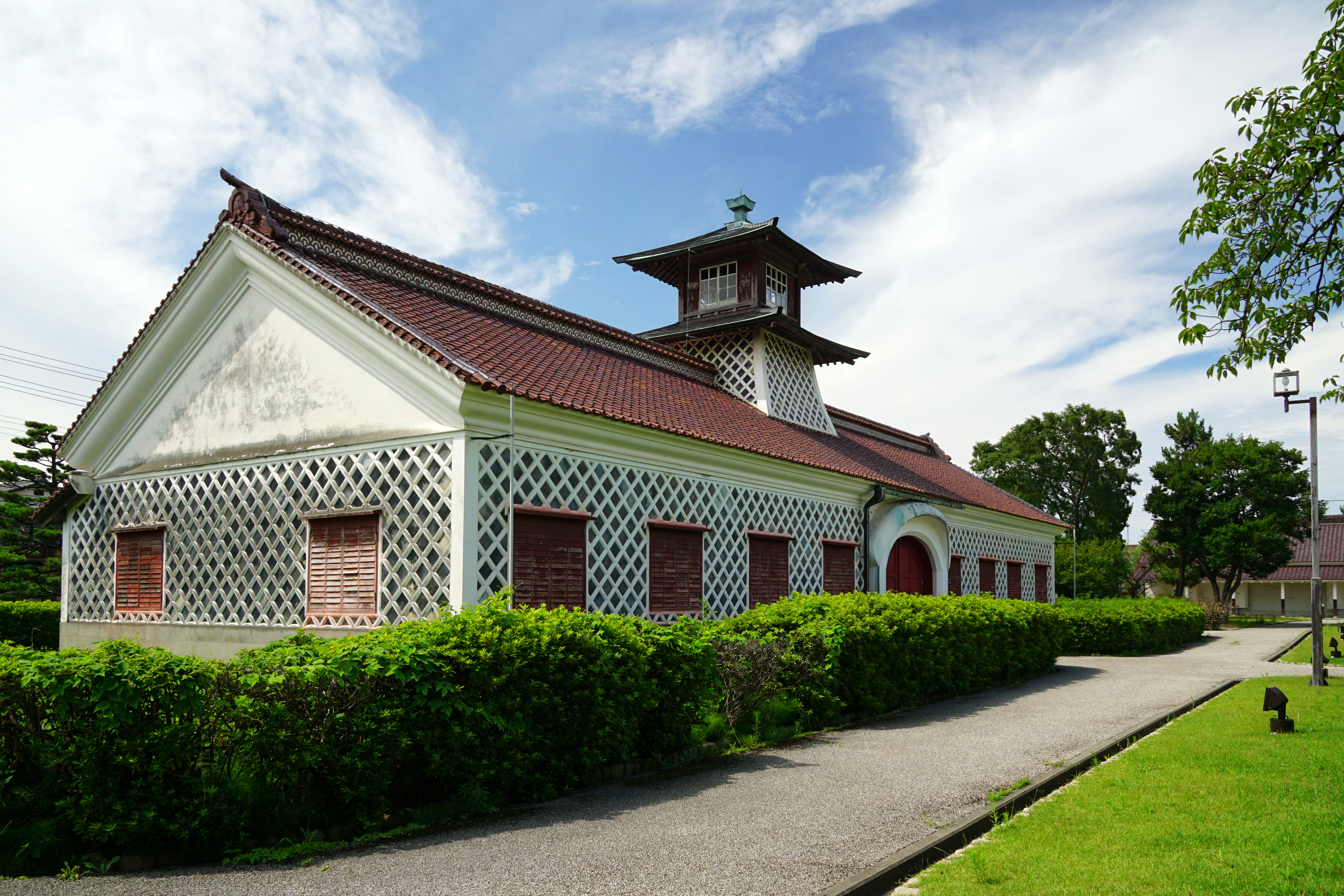
- The Former Niigata Customs House is an Important Cultural Property

- Location within Niigata Prefecture Location within Japan

General information
- Location: Niigata, Niigata Prefecture, Japan
- Coordinates: 37°55′49″N 139°03′27″E
- Opened: 1869
- Owner: Niigata City
- National Historic Site of Japan Important Cultural Property

Former Niigata Customs House (旧新潟税関, kyū-Niigata zeikan) is an early Meiji period building in the city of Niigata, Niigata, within the MINATOPIA, or park surrounding the Niigata City History Museum. The building was designated an Important Cultural Property of Japan and a National Historic Site of Japan in 1969. The building is an example of Giyōfū architecture, mixing western and Japanese elements. The building has red roof tiles and arched doorways, combined with "namako-style" plaster walls and a pagoda-like tower.

== Overview ==
The Treaty of Amity and Commerce (United States–Japan) of 1858, otherwise known as the "Harris Treaty" stipulated that the ports of Kanagawa, Hakodate, Nagasaki, Hyōgō and Niiigata be opened to foreign trade as treaty ports. Similar treaties were also signed with the United Kingdom, France, the Netherlands and Russia. Niigata was the largest port on the Sea of Japan which was under direct control of the Tokugawa Shogunate. However, in the case of Niigata, no action was taken until after the Meiji restoration and the port was only declared open to foreign shipping in 1868. The Niigata Customs House building was built in 1869, initially as a shipping office to coordinate the loading and unloading of vessels and warehousing of cargo, but from 1873 to 1966 was used as a government office to collect customs duties.

Since Niigata Port was located on the Shinano River, a riverbank near the mouth of the river was reclaimed to form a small artificial island, similar to Dejima in Nagasaki, and the customs office was located on this island. The building was constructed by local carpenters who visited Yokohama to view the Western-style buildings being erected in the treaty port there. The walls of the building utilized the Namako wall design that was popular at the time.

The building was damaged during the 1964 Niigata earthquake, and tsunami, and ceased to be used as a customs house in 1966. After its designation as a National Historic Site in 1969, It was turned over to the administration of the city of Niigata in 1970 and after several years of restoration to return it to its early Meiji period appearance, it now serves as a museum. The adjacent customs bonded warehouse was restored in 1982 in order to convey the scenery at the time of the opening of the customs office, and the stone steps of the landing site that had been buried in the ground due to the reclamation of the riverbank and land subsidence were also restored.

== See also ==
- List of Historic Sites of Japan (Niigata)
