= Satsuma Gishiden =

Japanese manga series

薩摩義士伝
- Genre: Adventure, historical
- Manga
- Written by: Hiroshi Hirata
- Published by: Nihon Bungeisha; Leed Publishing
- English publisher: NA: Dark Horse Comics
- Magazine: Weekly Manga Goraku
- Original run: 1977 – 1982
- Volumes: 6

Satsuma Gishiden (Japanese: 薩摩義士伝; lit. 'Tale of the Loyal Retainers of Satsuma') is a Japanese manga series written and illustrated by Hiroshi Hirata. It was serialized in Nihon Bungeisha's Weekly Manga Goraku magazine from 1977 to 1982 and published in six volumes.

== Plot ==
Satsuma Gishiden is a dramatic depiction of events surrounding the 1754 Hōreki River incident, and illustrates the melancholy fortitude of the samurai of Satsuma as well as that of the wajū people who fought the great rivers of the Nōbi Plain for centuries.

== Publication ==
Written and illustrated by Hiroshi Hirata, the series was serialized in Nihon Bungeisha's Weekly Manga Goraku magazine from 1977 to 1982. The series' individual chapters were collected into six tankōbon volumes. It was later re-released by Leed Publishing.

In October 2005, Dark Horse Comics announced that they licensed the series for English publication. They released three volumes.

== Reception ==
Jason Thompson of Anime News Network praised Hirata's artwork and the manga's historical background. He described Hirata's art as "more Western" than traditional manga artwork. Scott Green of Ain't It Cool News praised the story for its symbolism and political themes. Green also praised the artwork. Katherine Dacey of Manga Critic praised the manga's balance of historical and action scenes. Dacey also praised the artwork, describing the character designs as "rendered in miraculous detail".
