= Nanushi =

Japanese village leader in the Kantō region during the Edo period

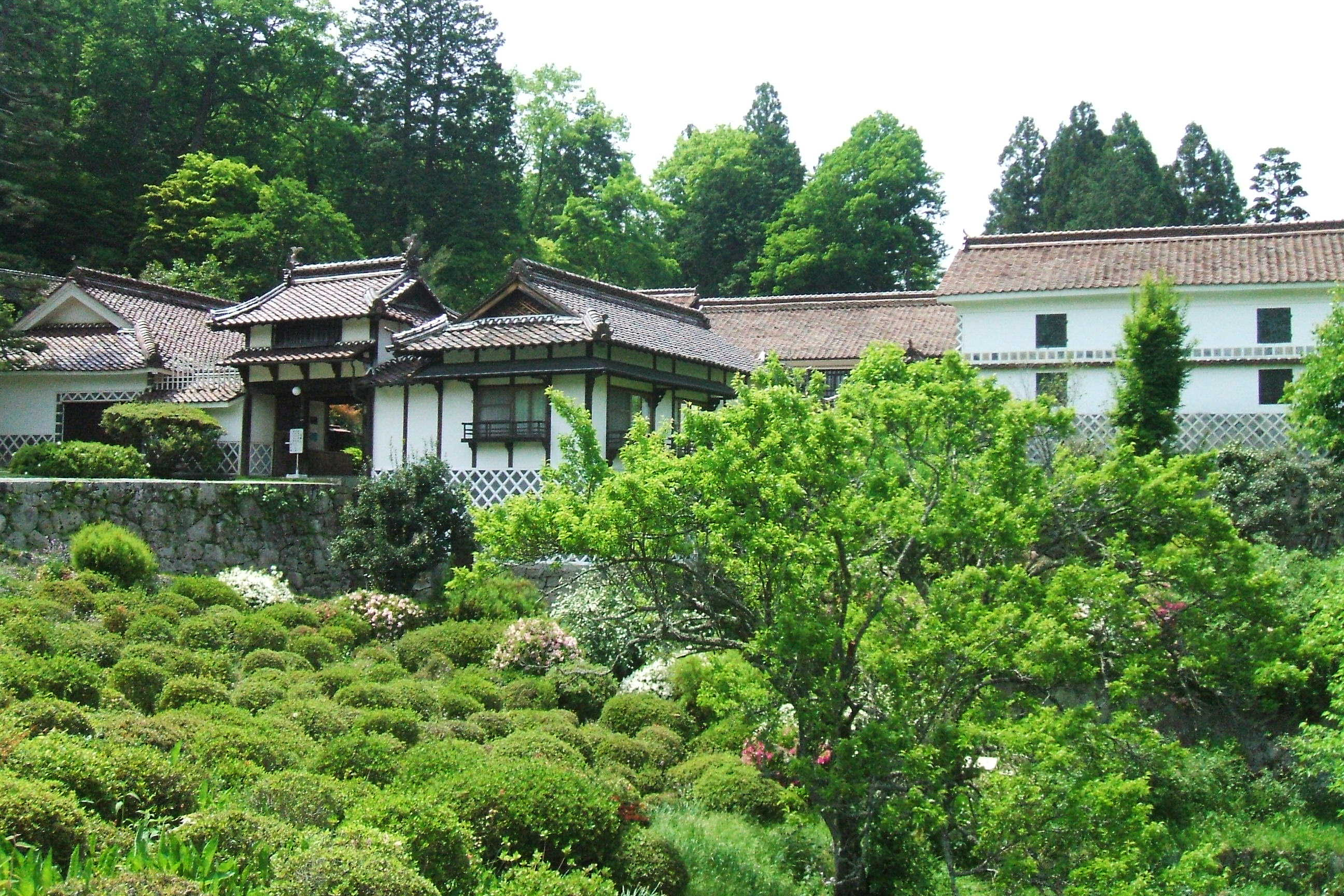
The house of a nanushi, the Nishie House in Takahashi, Okayama Prefecture

Nanushi (Japanese: 名主) were officials in Japan who administered villages (mura) under a district magistrate (gun-dai) in the Edo period. The most powerful nanushi, the ōjōya (大庄屋), administered up to several dozen villages, and were sometimes allowed privileges traditionally associated with the samurai class. The duties of a nanushi included tax collection and serving as the most local administrator of a rural village in direct contact with the villagers. The term nanushi was used in Kantō, while the official was called shōya (庄屋) in Kansai and kimoiri (肝煎) in Tōhoku and Hokuriku.

== Overview ==
The duties of nanushi included tax collection, general village administration, management of public natural resources (such as mountain, field, river and ocean) of a village called iriai, as well as negotiating with the territorial lord as the representative of the villagers. The most powerful nanushi, the ōjōya, administered between a dozen to several dozen villages, and ruled a territory valued between 7,000 and 10,500 koku. Some of them were given the privilege to bear a surname and to wear a katana (myōji-taitō) and were treated like members of the samurai class. Their duties also included the communication of laws and the coordination of lawsuits.

The post was typically monopolized by one or more powerful peasant families, the gōnō, through hereditary succession, though nominally appointed by the territorial lord who paid salary to the nanushi. The post was sometimes sold to the highest bidder, but was typically only given to a qualified person.

In castle towns (jōkamachi), there were town heads called machi-nanushi. In contrast to the nanushi of a village who served under a district magistrate (gun-dai), the machi-nanushi served under a town magistrate (machi-bugyō) or a ward head (machidoshiyori). A machi-nanushi was a townsman (chōnin).

== History ==
Both the terms nanushi and shōya, meaning a village head, derive from medieval terms. In the Middle Ages, nanushi (名主) was read as myōshu and referred to feudal lords of territorial fields (myōden) who were divided into petty lords (shōmyō) and magnates (daimyō), and shōya (庄屋) referred to the manor building of a manorial estate.

In the Edo period, a new system of village administration was established, with three types of village officials appointed in each village: nanushi, kumigashira (組頭), and hyakushōdai (百姓代). For each village there was one nanushi, a number of kumigashira, and one or more hyakushōdai. While the nanushi was the village head, the kumigashira were his advisors or assistants, and the hyakushōdai was the representative of village peasants who surveyed the work of village administrators. These offices were generally established between 1688 and 1704.

== See also ==
- Daimyo
- Gōnō
- Bugyō
- Gōzoku
