= Freshet =

High water levels caused by melting snow and ice

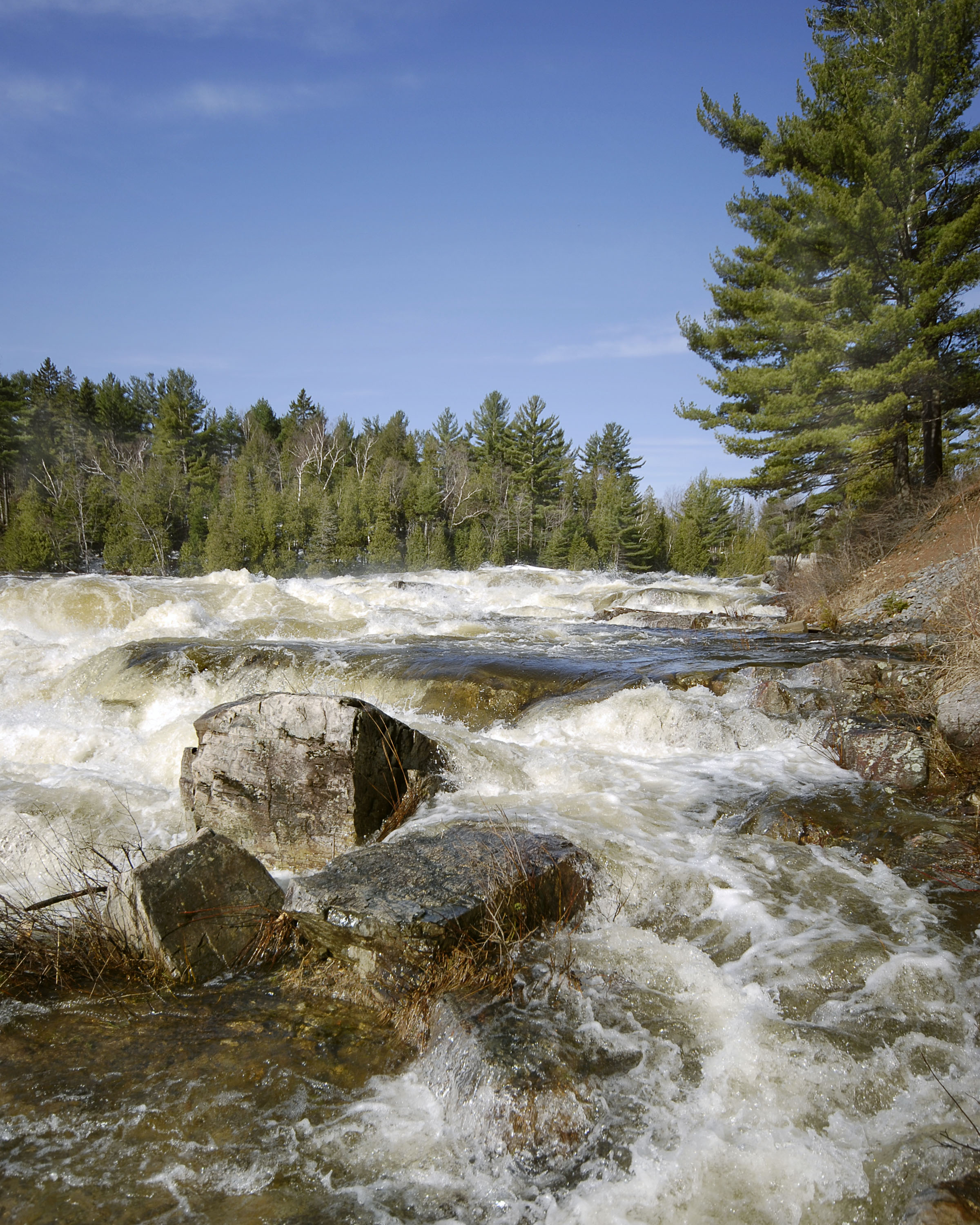
Freshet on Ouareau River in Rawdon, Quebec, Canada

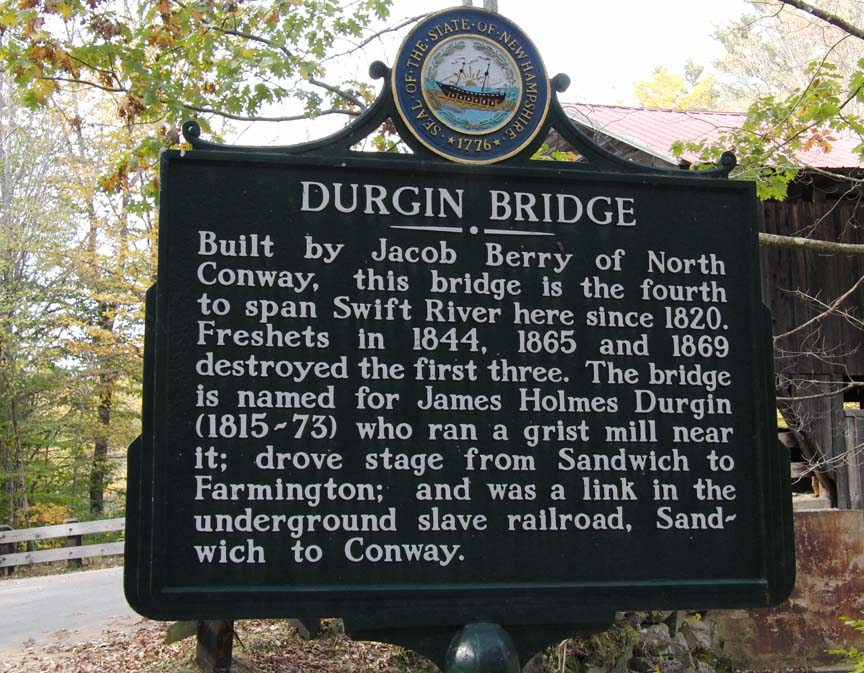
An example of usage of the term "freshet" is shown in the text on a historic marker at Durgin Bridge near Sandwich, New Hampshire.

A freshet is a snowmelt, an annual high water event on rivers resulting from snow and river ice melting.

== Description ==
A spring freshet can sometimes last several weeks on large river systems, resulting in significant inundation of flood plains as the snowpack melts in the river's watershed. Freshets can occur with differing strength and duration depending upon the depth of the snowpack and the local average rates of warming temperatures. Deeper snowpacks which melt quickly can result in more severe flooding. Late spring melts allow for faster flooding; this is because the relatively longer days and higher solar angle allow for average melting temperatures to be reached quickly, causing snow to melt rapidly. Snowpacks at higher altitudes and in mountainous areas remain cold and tend to melt over a longer period of time and thus do not contribute to major flooding. Serious flooding from freshets in southern US states are more often related to rain storms of large tropical weather systems rolling in from the South Atlantic or Gulf of Mexico, to add their powerful heating capacity to lesser snow packs. Tropically induced rainfall influenced quick melts can also affect snow cover to latitudes as far north as southern Canada, so long as the generally colder air mass is not blocking northward movement of low pressure systems.

In the eastern part of the continent, annual freshets occur from the Canadian Taiga ranging along both sides of the Great Lakes then down through the heavily forested Appalachian mountain chain and St. Lawrence valley from Northern Maine and New Brunswick into barrier ranges in North Carolina and Tennessee.

In the western part of the continent, freshets occur throughout the generally much higher elevations of the various west coast mountain ranges that extend southward down from Alaska even into the northern parts of Arizona and New Mexico.

The term can also refer to the following:

- A flood resulting from heavy rain or a spring thaw. Whereas heavy rain often causes a flash flood, a spring thaw event is generally a more incremental process, depending upon local climate and topography.
- A stream, river or flood of fresh water which empties into the ocean, usually flowing through an estuary.
- A small stream of fresh water, irrespective of its outflow.
- A pool of fresh water, according to Samuel Johnson's A Dictionary of the English Language and followed in Thomas Sheridan's dictionary, but this might have been a misinterpretation on Johnson's part, and it is at best not a common usage.
- A controlled release of extra water into a river from a dam or other impounding structure, in additional to normal compensation flows, intended to simulate high flow events which would normally occur naturally if the river was not impounded. They are designed to aid fish migration.

== Causes ==
Freshets are the result of the mass delivery of water to the landscape, either by snowmelt, heavy rains, or a combination of the two. Specifically, freshets occur when this water enters streams and results in flooding and high flow conditions. When freshets occur in the winter or early spring, the frozen ground can contribute to rapid flooding. This is because the meltwaters cannot easily infiltrate the frozen surface and instead run overland into rivers and streams, leading to a rapid flooding response. Deeper snow packs with large snow water equivalents (SWE) are capable of delivering larger quantities of water to rivers and streams, compared to smaller snowpacks, given that they reach adequate melting temperatures. When melting temperatures are reached quickly and snowmelt is rapid, flooding can be more intense. In areas where freshets dominate the hydrological regime, such as the Fraser River Basin in British Columbia, the timing of freshets is critical. In the Fraser River Basin, the annual freshet was observed 10 days earlier in 2006 compared to 1949. In these areas, earlier freshets can result in low flow conditions later in the summer or fall.

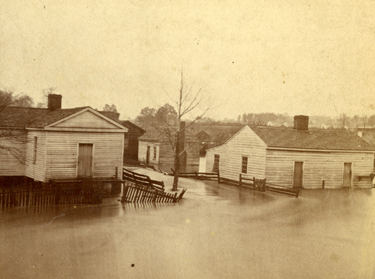
A freshet on the Ocmulgee river, Macon, GA, United States c. 1876

Freshets may also occur due to rainfall events. Significant rainfall events can saturate the ground and lead to rapid inundation of streams, as well as contributing to snowmelt by delivering energy to snowpacks through advection. In the tropics, tropical storms and cyclones can lead to freshet events.

== Ecology ==
The magnitude of freshets depends on snow accumulation and temperature. Smaller freshets have been associated with El Niño conditions, where the milder conditions lead to lower snow accumulations. The opposite is true under La Niña conditions. Runoff from freshets is a major contributor of nutrients to lakes. In La Niña conditions with stronger freshets, higher runoff, and high nutrient inputs, more positive ecological indicator species (Arcellacea) are present in lakes, indicating lower levels of ecological stress. In El Niño conditions, smaller freshets contribute less runoff and result in lower nutrient inputs to lakes and rivers. In these conditions, fewer positive ecological indicator species are present.

Migratory fish, such as salmon and trout, are highly responsive to freshets. In low flows present at the end of freshets, fish are more likely to ascend streams (move upstream). During high flows at the peak of a freshet, fish are more likely to descend streams. There are some species of fish that are less affected from freshets than others. Goby Pomatoschistusssp for example, show similar patterns of migration and recover in population abundance and distribution after/during freshet conditions. The benthic-estuarine species seem to better cope with freshets, some have even showed an attraction effect due to the extent of estuarine cues. Some species are affected by the consequences of freshets more than others. This is due to multiple factors, some include, but not limited to: differentiation in species biological anatomy, previous migration patterns, mating seasons, and feeding habits.

=== Biogeochemical Impacts ===
Freshets are often associated with high levels of dissolved organic carbon (DOC) in streams and rivers. During base flows, water entering streams comes from deep in the soil where carbon contents are lower due to microbial digestion. During a freshet, water is more likely to run overland, where it dissolves the abundant, less degraded carbon present in the uppermost soil layers before entering streams. High dissolved organic carbon (DOC) levels lead to a decrease in the net primary productivity of the stream by enhancing heterotrophic microbial growth. Freshets have also been linked to compressing salinity gradients, increasing turbidity, and in the most intense conditions of freshets they have decreased oxygen levels.

Artificial freshets have also been correlated with changes in migration patterns of adult Atlantic salmon. A study was conducted in southern Norway which showed significant alterations in migration distances. Comparing the data from pre-freshet, during freshet, and post-freshet the mean migration distances per hour of the salmon showed significant differences.

Freshets may cause catastrophic changes to society, specifically in the economy and agriculture of populated environments. The floods caused by high waters from the rivers have been documented to destroy historical monuments, destroy ecosystems as well as pose a great threat to any life living near the freshet event, including human life. The research of predicting the changes of water levels due to freshets have become a large topic in the scientific community due to prior and future catastrophic events.

== History ==
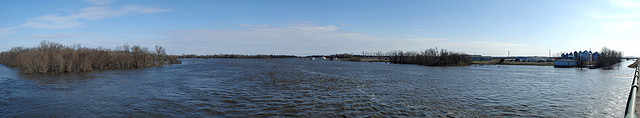
Panorama from the top of a bridge, showing the true extent of the recent overland flooding south of Winnipeg.

The 1997 Red River Valley Flood was the result of an exceptionally large freshet fed by large snow accumulations which melted due to rapidly warming temperatures, producing large volumes of meltwater which inundated the frozen ground. At the peak of the flood, the Red River reached a depth of 16.46 metres (54.0 ft) and a maximum discharge of 4,000 cubic metres per second (140,000 cu ft/s). This event has been referred to as "the flood of the century" in the areas impacted.

The Fraser River in British Columbia experiences yearly freshets fed by snowmelt in the spring and early summer. The largest freshet ever experienced in the Fraser River occurred in 1894 and resulted in an estimated peak discharge of 17,000 cubic metres per second (600,000 cu ft/s) and a peak height of 11.75 metres (38.5 ft) at Hope, BC. However, due to the low population this flood had a minor impact compared to the second largest flood in 1948, which had a peak discharge of 15,200 cubic metres per second (540,000 cu ft/s) and a peak height of 10.97 metres (36.0 ft) at Hope, BC. The 1948 flood caused extensive damage in the lower Fraser Valley and cost 20 million dollars at the time.

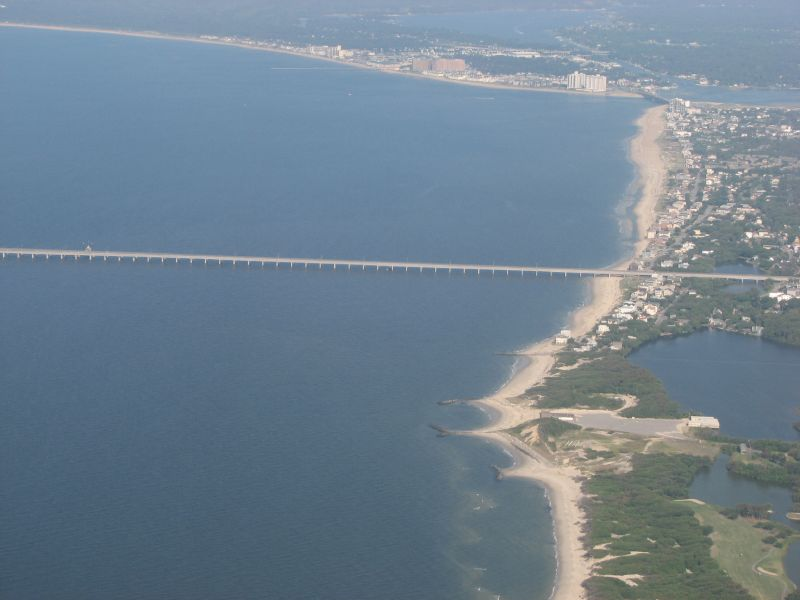
Aerial view of the southern entrance to the Chesapeake Bay Bridge-Tunnel. The water is the Chesapeake Bay and Virginia Beach is to the right.

In 1972, the Susquehanna River which flows into the Chesapeake Bay experienced a considerably large freshet due to Tropical Storm Agnes, resulting in flooding and increased sedimentation in the Chesapeake Bay. At the peak of the flood on June 24, 1972, the instantaneous peak flow was greater than 32,000 cubic metres per second (1,100,000 cu ft/s), and at the mouth of the river, the concentration of suspended solids was greater than 10,000 milligrams per liter.

In southwestern Japan the Ohashi River runs between two brackish-water lagoons. In this river Ammonia "beccarii" forma 1 (a benthic foraminiferan) has been found to colonize these waters depending on seasonal changes in the ecosystem. These organisms have been studied prior and post freshet events, and have been found to recover even when their habitat has been diminished by physical disturbances. The freshets in winter or early spring cause rapid flooding. The water abundance due to the melting of snow cannot easily infiltrate the frozen surface and run into nearby rivers, in this study the Ohashi River. Many of the organisms in this river have evolved to overcome the effects of the freshets

== See also ==
- Wajū
