= Wajū =

Hydraulic engineering and flood control structure

A wajū (輪中; lit. 'inside the circle') Japanese pronunciation: [wa(d)ʑɯː] is a hydraulic engineering and flood control structure unique to the alluvial floodplain of the Kiso Three Rivers in central Japan. It is comparable to the European polder. The hardships endured for centuries by farmers whose lives revolved around the wajū has given rise to the term "wajū spirit" (輪中根性, wajū konjō).

== History ==
Since prehistoric times sudden freshets along the course of the major rivers of Owari and Mino in late spring caused by snowmelt in the snow country, especially in the Japanese Alps and Koshi, created great suffering for agricultural communities. The wajū was developed to protect fertile riparian farmland from being submerged by rising water levels during these freshets. Wajū are known to have been in use since at least the 16th century, but some wajū are reputed to be much older, such as Takasu wajū which was allegedly completed in 1319.

To develop a wajū, an area of land, usually a river island, was enclosed by a levee ring. In the event of a levee failure, most wajū incorporated structures allowing for vertical evacuation. Between multiple waju with different internal water levels, a stake or post called a sadamegui (定杭; lit. 'regulating post') would be set up at the elevation of the mean water level.

One evacuation system used by those who could afford to build it, such as the well-to-do gōnō, was the mizuya (水屋), a sort of tower house above the high water line built on a foundation in ishigaki style. For lower class people, including peasants and rural samurai (gōshi), who couldn't afford to build mizuya, there was the inochizuka (命塚; lit. 'life [preserving] mound') an artificial earthen high ground similar to the terps of Northern Europe or the cattle mounds built on American ranches.

Over the centuries, the wajū suffered numerous failures due to engineering deficiencies. In the 18th century, Izawa Yasobē was among the first to suggest redirecting the rivers to relieve water pressure on the wajū and compensate for the inadequacies of the existing system of pressure-regulating aqueducts, known as hayodoyu (夙樋). In the late 19th century, the wajū were improved and reinforced using technology imported from Europe.

== Gallery ==
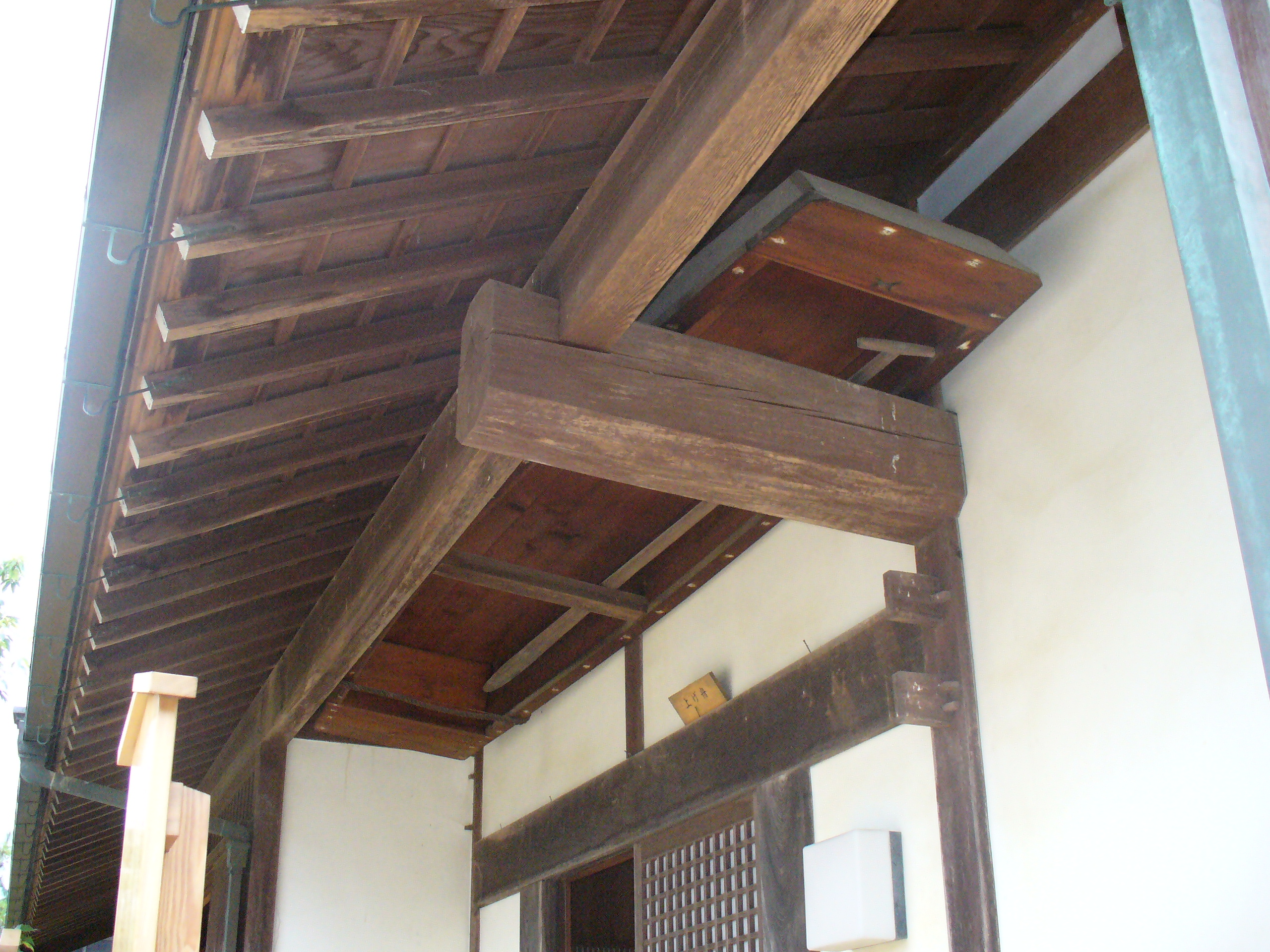
An agebune (上げ舟) punt stored in the rafters of a wajū building in case of rising water

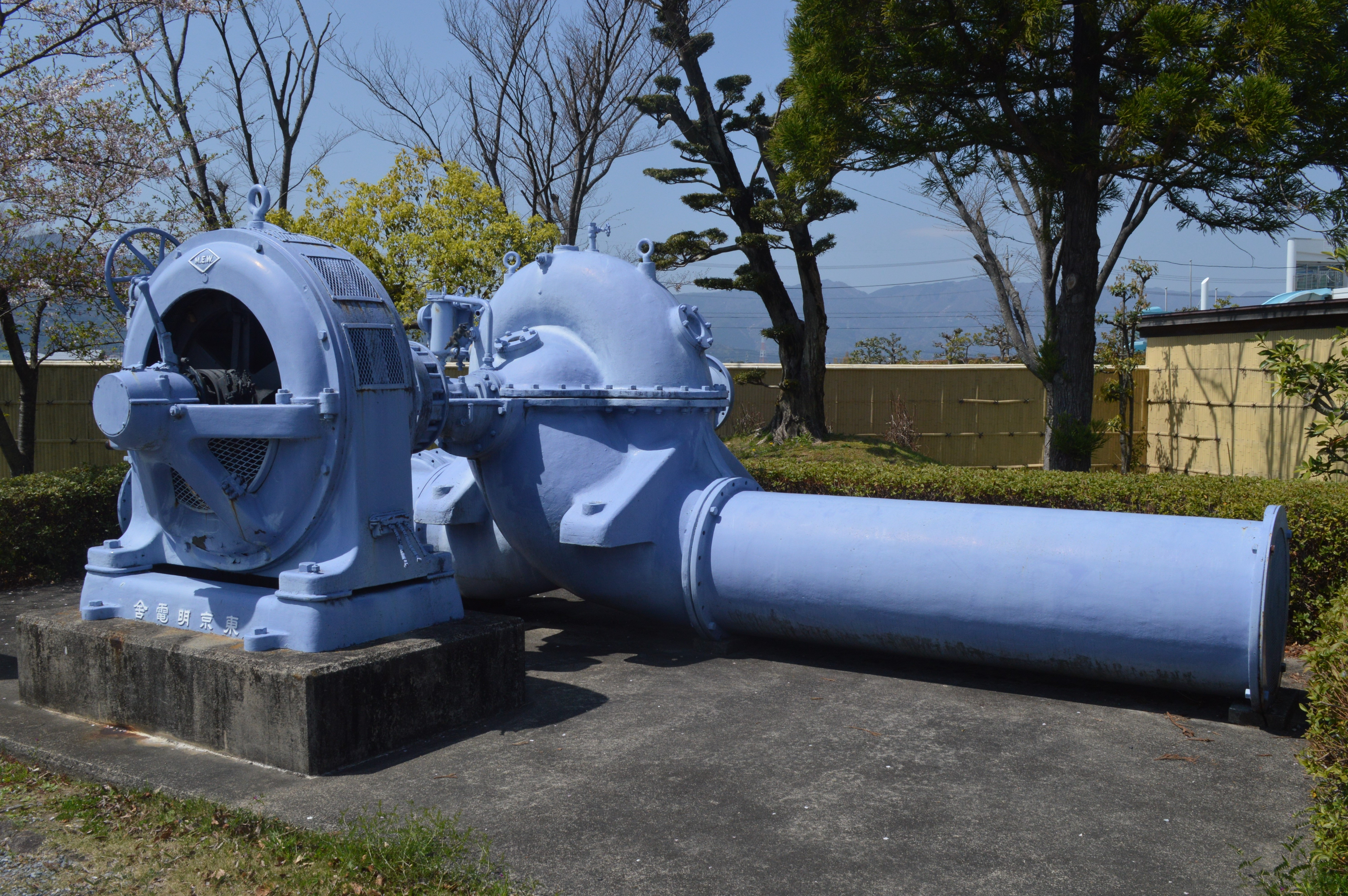
Early 20th century wajū pump by Meidensha at the Museum of History and Folklore in Kaizu

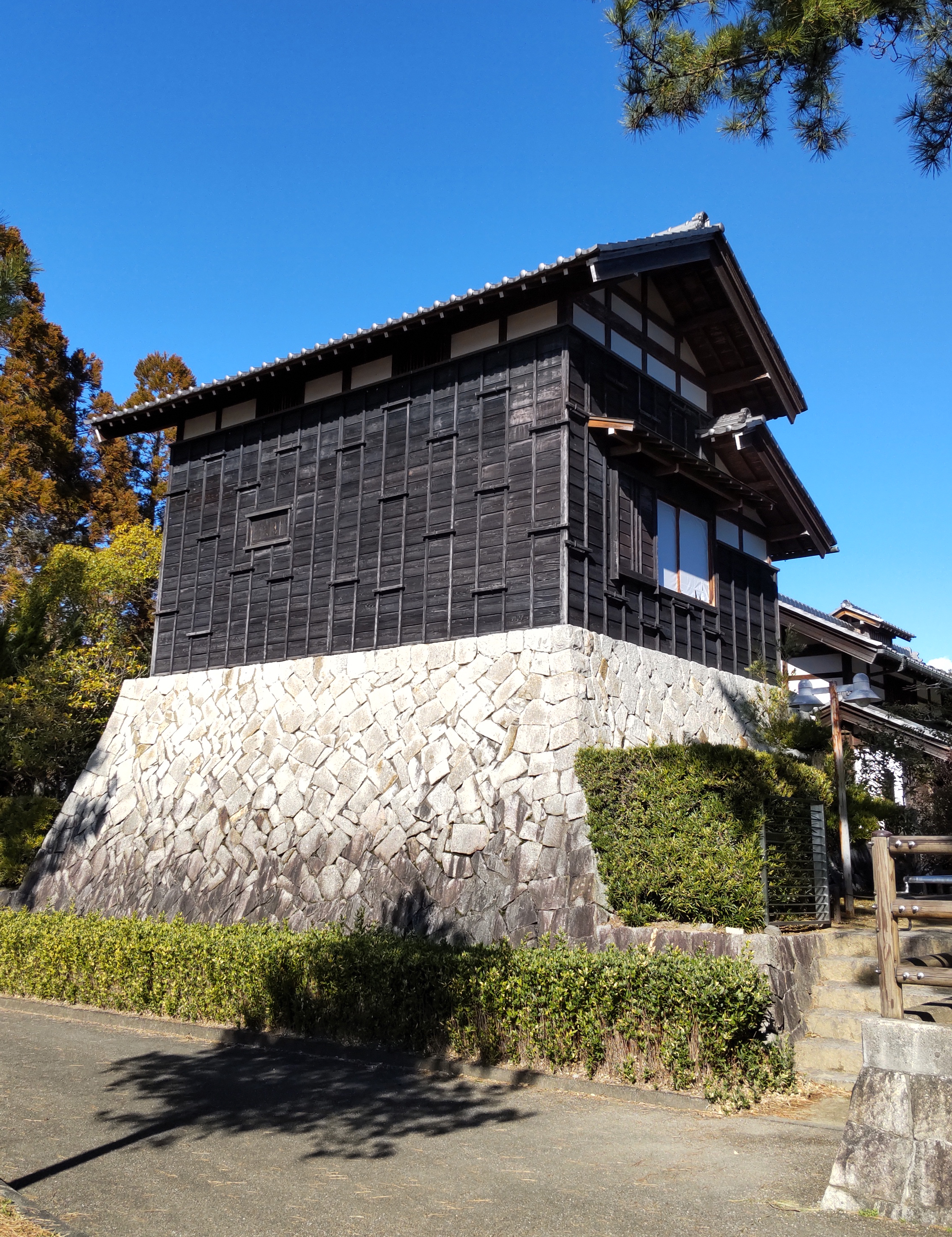
A mizuya flood tower in Kaizu

== See also ==
- Ōgaki Castle, which is protected by a wajū
- Johannis de Rijke
- Tatsuta wajū sluice gates
- 1754 Hōreki River incident
- Midai River embankments
