= Hiroshi Hirata =

Japanese manga artist (1937–2021)

Hiroshi Hirata (平田 弘史, Hirata Hiroshi, February 9, 1937 – December 11, 2021) was a Japanese manga artist best known in the United States for the samurai manga series Satsuma Gishiden, which is published in the United States by Dark Horse Comics. Hirata's works belong to the subset of manga known as "gekiga" ("dramatic pictures"), and his artwork has a realistic style comparable to Goseki Kojima's work on Lone Wolf and Cub. He was also known for his use of elaborate calligraphy for dialogue (he did the kanji for Akira), which has been preserved (though still translated) in the American editions of his work.

According to Frederik L. Schodt's Dreamland Japan: Writings on Modern Manga, famed Japanese author and militarist Yukio Mishima admired Hirata's work. Also, Usagi Yojimbo creator Stan Sakai has praised Hirata's artwork.

Hirata is one of the very few manga authors whose work has been translated into Hindi. A translation by Yoshiyo Takakura of his 1978 manga Chi Daruma Kenpo was published by Yukichi Yamamatsu's Delhi-based Ganga Yamato Company in 2005.

Hirata died of heart failure on December 11, 2021, at the age of 84.
