= Midai River embankments =

- 御勅使川旧堤防 (Japanese)
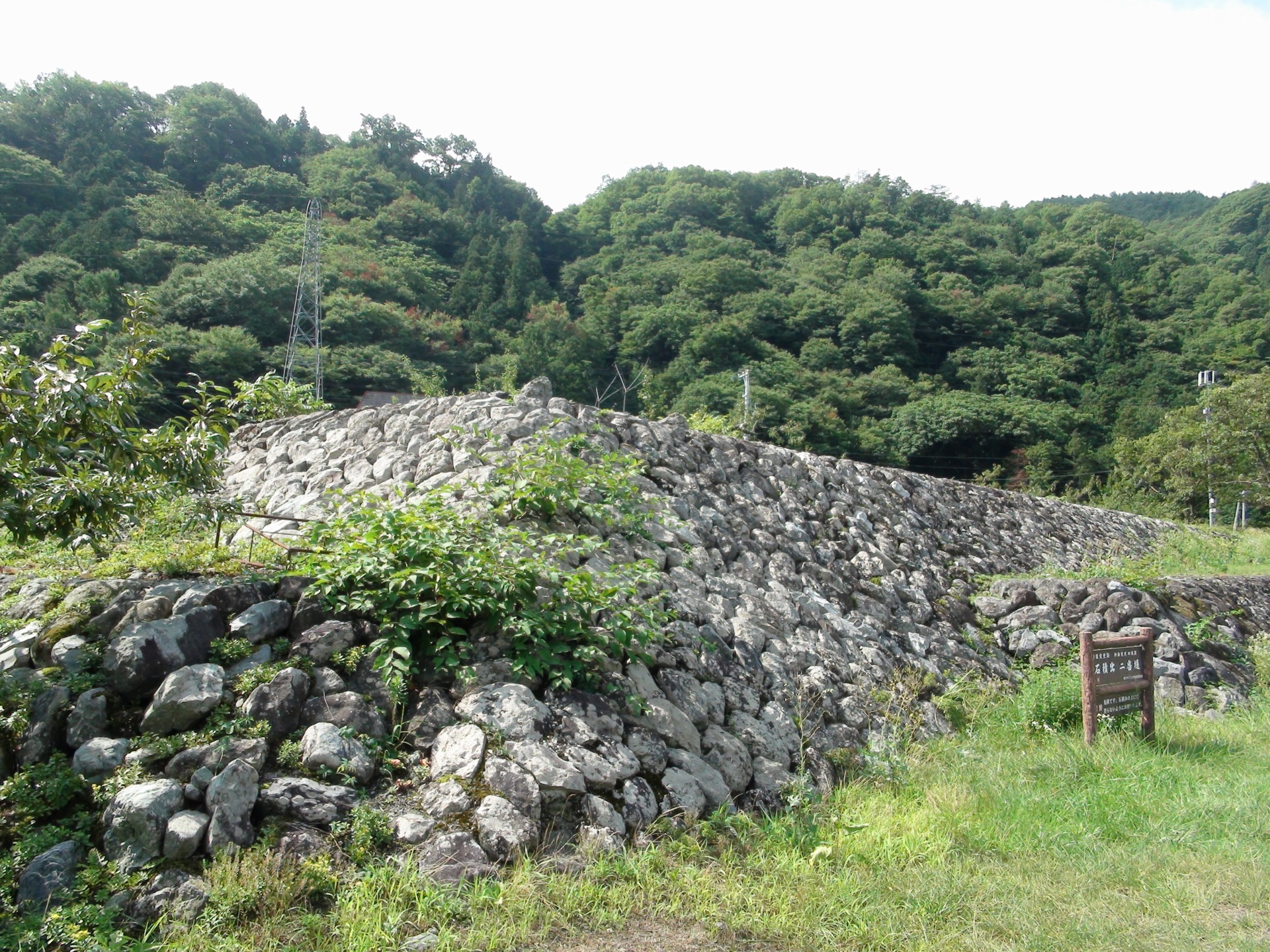
- Midai River embankments

- Midai River embankments Midai River embankments (Japan)
- 35°39′13″N 138°25′00″E
- Periods: Sengoku period
- Location: Nirasaki, Minami-Alps, Yamanashi, Japan
- Region: Chūbu region

Site notes
- Public access: Yes (no facilities)

The Midai River embankments (御勅使川旧堤防, Midai gawa kyū-teibō iseki) was a system of flood control levees constructed by the Sengoku period warlord Takeda Shingen to protect the central Kōfu Basin in the Chūbu region of Japan. These levees were located in what is now the cities of Nirasaki and Minami-Alps in Yamanashi Prefecture. The remnants were designated a National Historic Site of Japan in 2003, with the area under designation expanded in 2009.

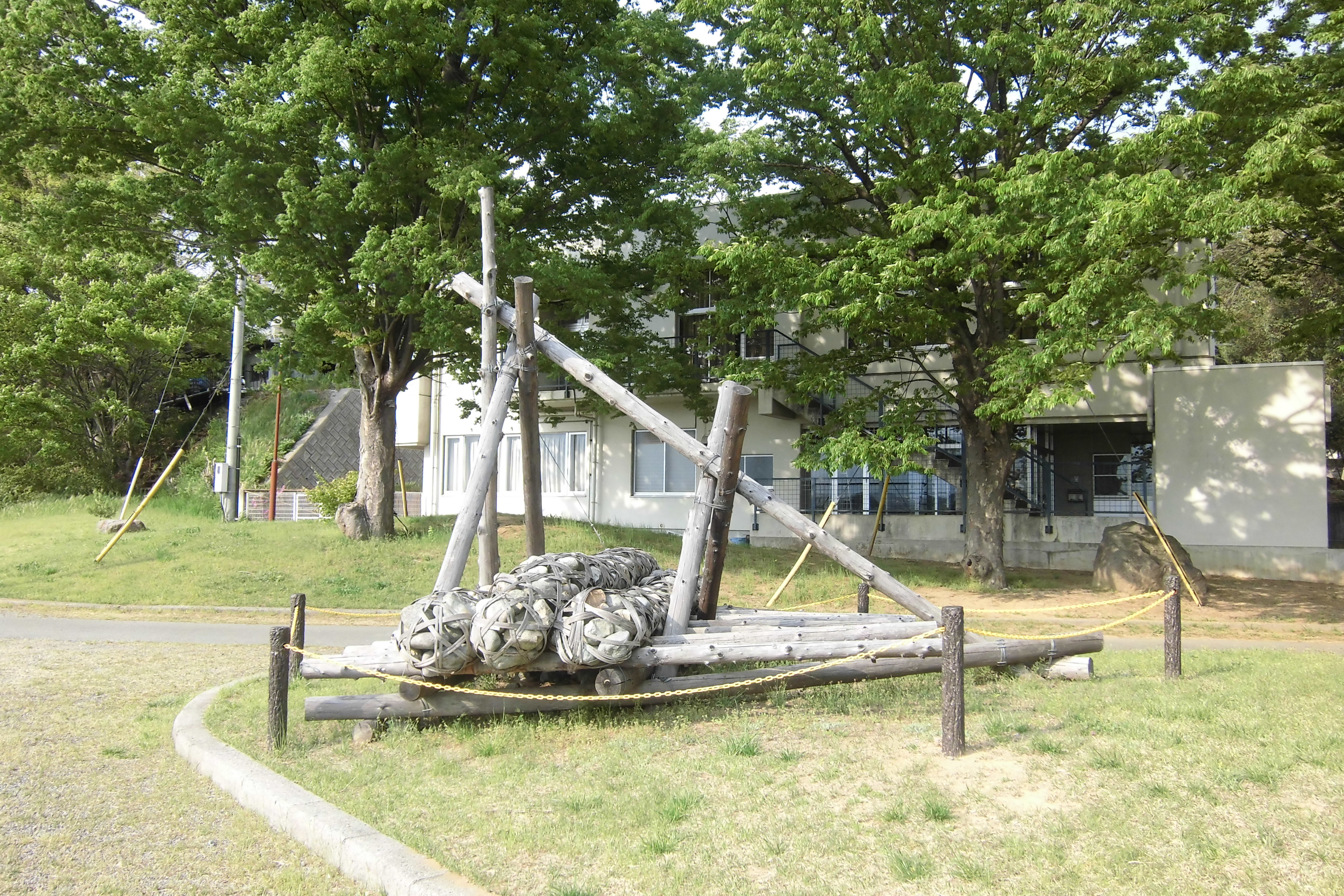
A traditional seigyū (聖牛) gabion device for altering river morphology from the nearby Shingen-zutsumi levees

== Overview ==
The Midai River is an 18.6 kilometer long tributary of the Kamanashi River which originates in the Southern Alps. It was subject to flash flooding due to snow melt off in spring and typhoons in summer and autumn. Massively flooding had been known to occur since ancient times, and even the name of the Midai River (御勅使川) comes from the fact that an Imperial envoy was sent to the area in 825 AD to investigate a flood disaster. The warlord of Kai Province, Takeda Shingen, considered that control of the river was essential for his clan to prosper and to control the province, as Kai Province had relatively little flat land for agriculture, and what little existed was concentrated on the flood plain of the Kamanashi River. Almost immediately after seizing power in the province from his father in 1541, he began an ambitious series of civil engineering projects which would continue over the next 20 years. His attention was first drawn to the alluvial fan of the Midai River at its confluence with the Kamanashi River, which flooded in 1542. Despite its relatively small size, this river carried a huge amount of earth and sand, forming an alluvial fan with an area four kilometers in radius. When the river flooded, it would push this debris into the main Kamanashi River, causing it to push the flow of the larger river into the Kōfu Basin. Therefore, in order to control the larger river, it was essential to control the Midai River first.

Shingen's strategy was to construct a series of dikes to solidify the flow path of the Midai River as it crossed the alluvial fan and to direct it to a series of pentagonal-shaped levees (patterned after a shogi chess pieces), which would divide the flow. A number of channels were dug to guide the divided flow to the Kamanashi River. In addition, a group of 16 huge boulders were places in the path of the merging flow to reduce the water velocity and kinetic energy, and location for the flow merging into the Kamanashi River was selected to be opposite the Takaiwa cliffs to further reduce its energy. Further levees were constructed along the banks of the Kamanashi River itself; in places these levees were doubled or even tripled as insurance in case the flood managed to breach the primary levee. In order to ensure the maintenance of these works, he exempted people living nearby from taxation in return for providing maintenance on the levees and promoted local matsuri to educate the people on the importance of flood control. Construction is estimated to have taken over twenty years. However, despite these efforts, flooding continued to occur during the Edo period (most notably in 1653), and the shape of the embankments have been altered a number of times.

The remaining portions of the levee is located 70 minutes on foot from the "Shio no Mae Iriguchi" bus stop on the Yamanashi Kotsu Bus from Kōfu Station on the JR Tōkai Chūō Main Line.

== See also ==
- Wajū
