= Northern Culture Museum =

- 北方文化博物館
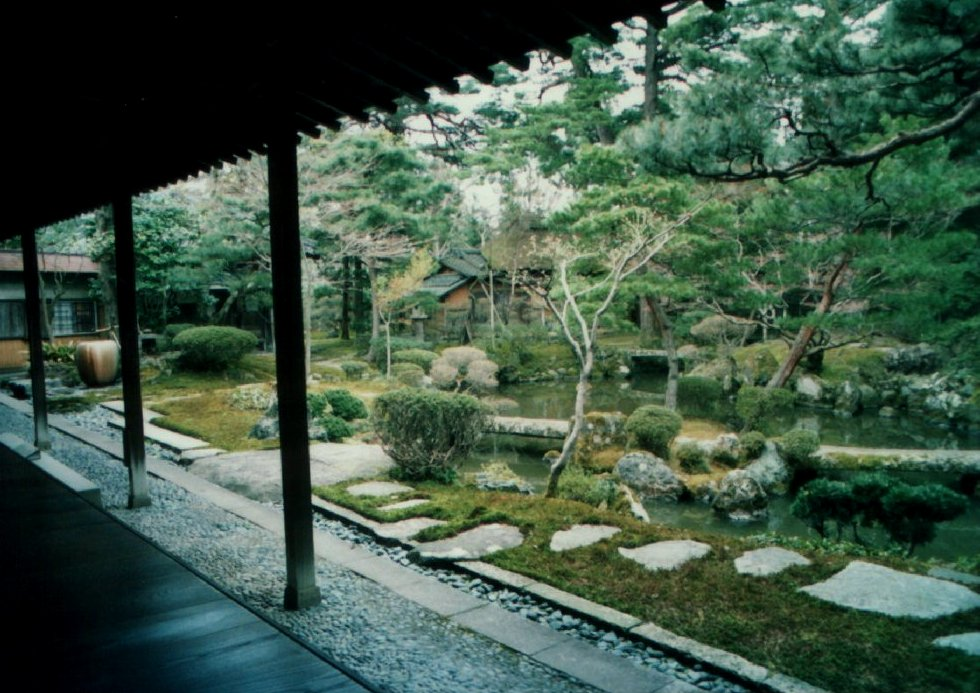
- Garden in the museum

General information
- Location: 2-15-25 Sōmi, Kōnan-ku, Niigata, Niigata Prefecture, Japan
- Coordinates: 37°49′46.62″N 139°9′7.73″E

Website
- hoppou-bunka.com/english/

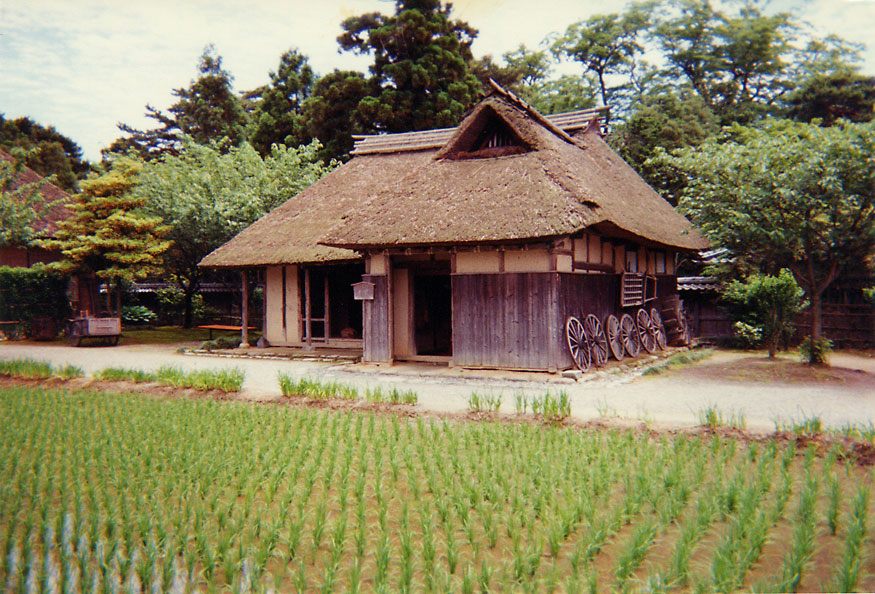
Reconstruction of a 19th-century peasant farmer's house and rice paddy at the museum

Northern Culture Museum (北方文化博物館, Hoppō Bunka Hakubutsukan) is an open-air museum in Kōnan-ku, Niigata, Japan. It contains the well known mansion of a wealthy farming family called gōnō (豪農), gardens and houses from the Edo period. There is also a branch in Chūō-ku, Niigata.

== Access ==
There is a bus stop 'Kami-sōmi Hakubutsukan-mae (上沢海博物館前)' near the museum. Transit bus operated by Niigata Kotsu S94 and S95 (line: S9) runs from Niigata Station Bandai Exit.

There is also YOKO-BUS stop 'Hoppō Bunka Hakubutsukan (北方文化博物館)'. YOKO-BUS runs from Shin'etsu Main Line Ogikawa Station.

== Surrounding area ==
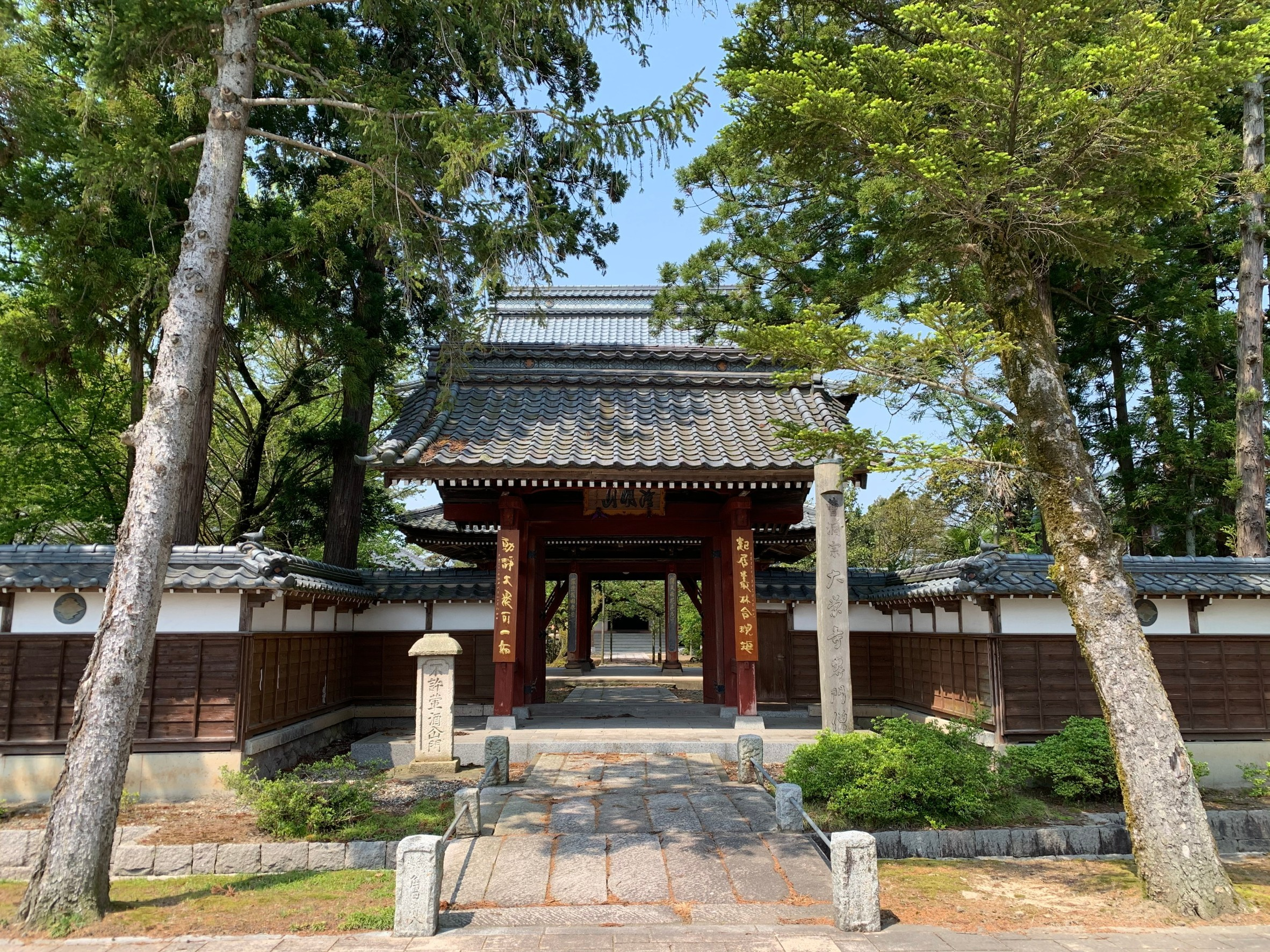
Daiei-ji temple

The museum is in the central area of former Sōmi Domain (沢海藩), the subsidiary of Shibata Domain.
