= Gōnō =

Peasantry in the Edo period and Meiji era

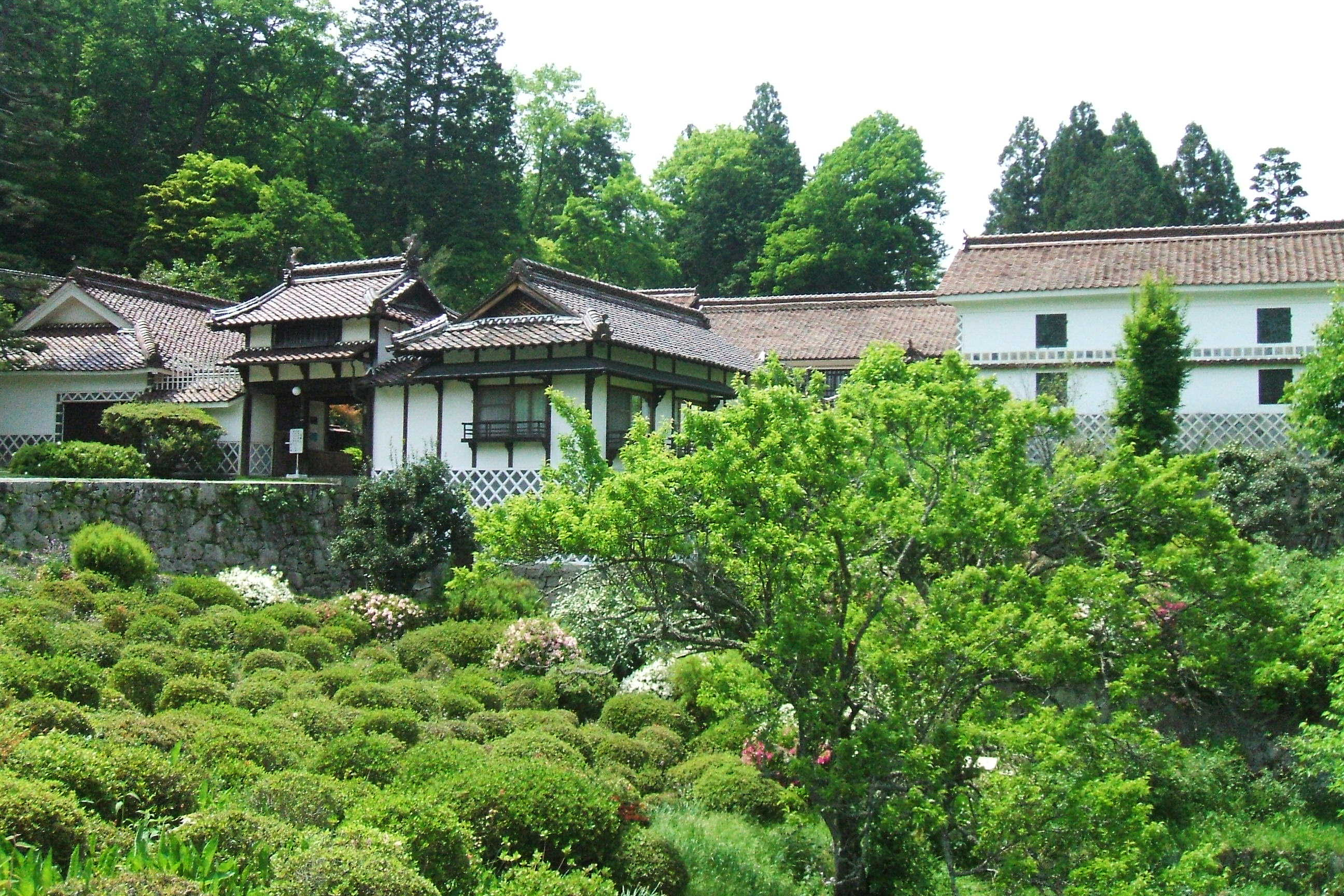
The house of a nanushi, the Nishie House in Takahashi, Okayama Prefecture

Gōnō (豪農) were the upper-class peasantry in the late Edo period and early Meiji era Japan. They held considerable wealth and power in local communities, and aside from being major landowners, some owned small rural industries or served as village officials (such as nanushi). They played an important role in the industrialization and development of capitalism in Japan.

== History ==
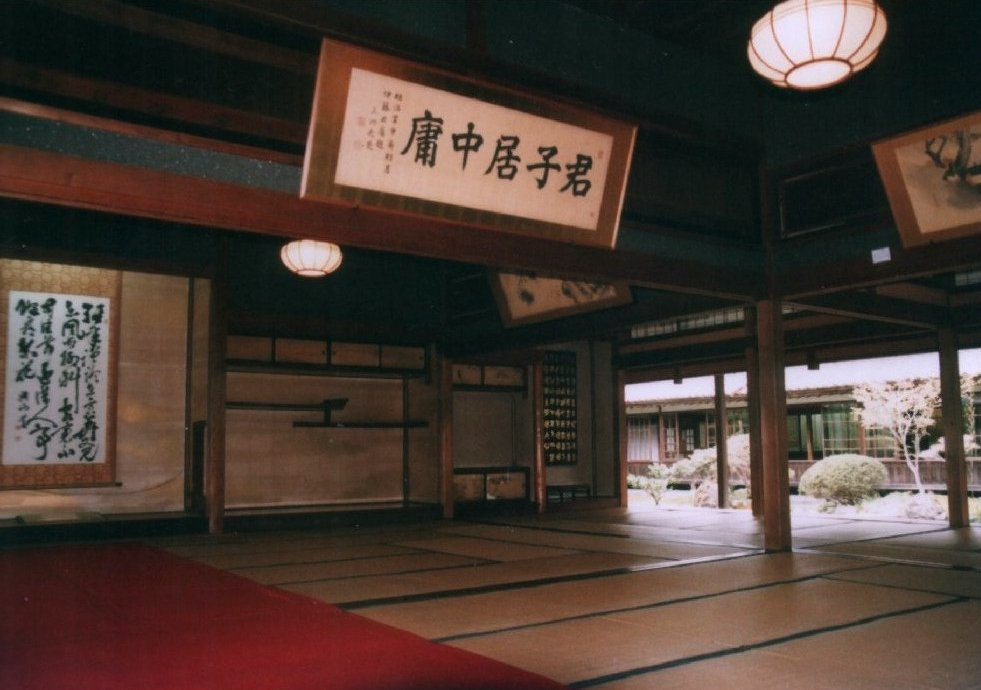
Interior of the former Itō Bunkichi house (now the Northern Culture Museum)

In the early Edo period, most peasants managed small farms, and the birth of gōnō is closely linked to the introduction of monetary economy in the mid-Edo period. The growing monetary economy caused social stratification among the peasantry, leading to the increase of wealthy peasants, the gōnō. On the other hand, this also led to the birth of many tenant farmers. The gōnō received land rent from the tenant farmers and bought the majority of their produce by lending in advance to corner the market.

Towards the end of the Edo period and the beginning of Meiji era, the gōnō became more and more dependent on employed labor. At the time, most gōnō owned about 5-10 hectares of land. Many gōnō became industrial landowners taking on silk farming and silk reeling. In cooperation with the feudal lords, they were the pioneers of industrialization. They also played a central role in producing goods for the city merchants (chōnin). They played an important role in political economy around the time of Meiji Restoration, and they are generally recognized to have been involved in the intrinsic development of capitalism.

During the period of collapsing feudalism, there was a brief trend of gōnō rising to the lordly class. However, after the Meiji Restoration, when the conditions for modernization were met, they once again developed capitalistic qualities.

In the early Meiji era, many gōnō became involved in the Freedom and People's Rights Movement, and especially the "gōnō rights". Such gōnō activists included Sugita Teiichi and Dogura Shōsaburō. Many gōnō began to demand a place for their opinions to be heard, such as a citizen assembly or a national diet, and criticized the Meiji oligarchy.

However, in the late Meiji era, a new land ownership system was installed, which led to the recession of land productivity. This, along with the collapse of the civil rights movement and the negative effects of Matsukata Deflation caused by the Satsuma Rebellion, drove the gōnō class into recession. The new land ownership system, along with the financial complications, meant that land was given to many small tenant farmers who were freed from the productivity-focused gōnō. The gōnō thus became landlords earning their income from land rent instead of the production.

== See also ==
- Gōzoku
- Petite bourgeoisie
