= Brigandine (video game) =

1998 video game

- North American cover art
- Developer: Hearty Robin
- Publishers: JP: Hearty Robin; NA: Atlus
- Designer: Yoichi Kawade
- Composers: Yumiko Mori; Atsushi Noguchi; Yusuke Yada
- Platform: PlayStation
- Release: JP: April 2, 1998; NA: November 13, 1998; Grand Edition: JP: May 5, 2000
- Genres: Turn-based strategy, tactical role-playing
- Modes: Single-player, multiplayer

Brigandine is a turn-based strategy game for the PlayStation video game console, created by developer Hearty Robin and released in 1998. It was released in North America by Atlus the same year, under the title Brigandine: The Legend of Forsena. In 2000, Hearty Robin released an expanded version of the game called Brigandine: Grand Edition, which included multiplayer support along with other new features. In the game, the player chooses one of the nations of the fictional continent of Forsena, and has the goal of conquering the other nations by taking their castles, using troops composed of humanoid commanders, and fictional creatures. Although primarily a strategy game, it also includes some characteristics of tactical role-playing games.

A sequel titled Brigandine: The Legend of Runersia, developed by Matrix Software and published by Happinet, was released on the Nintendo Switch in June 2020.

== Gameplay ==
In Brigandine, the player controls one of the six playable nations. Each nation possesses a number of units and castles. Units are organized into troops, each of which is composed of a human (or Elven) leader called a "Rune Knight" (or "knight" for short) and fictional creatures called "monsters", which include dragons, ghouls, and pixies. The goal of the player is to conquer the entire continent by attacking the enemy castles with the controlled nation's troops (or troops from allied nations). Likewise, troops are also used to protect the controlled nation's castles from enemy troops' attacks. Brigandine features two gameplay modes, both turn-based: a preparation mode and a battle mode.

Rune Knights and monsters have statistics typical of role-playing video game, such as experience points, hit points, attack, defense, magic points, and the like. Rune Knights also have character classes, and may switch between classes if certain conditions are met. Monsters don't have classes, but may be upgraded to more powerful forms, called promotions, when they have reached a minimum level or some special items are used. The number of monsters which may join a troop is limited by the Rune Knight's Rune Power statistic. Each nation is led by a ruler, who has a unique class but is otherwise similar to other Rune Knights.

=== Preparation mode ===
In this mode, each turn is represented by an in-game "month". The player may navigate and view statistics of all castles on the continent (although only the castles of the player's nation may be managed). Each month has an organize phase and an attack phase.

In the organize phase, the player may reallocate troops between castles, re-allocate monsters between troops, summon new monsters, equip and use items, change Rune Knights' classes, and promote monsters. The player may also send Rune Knights on quests.

To summon additional monsters, mana must be spent. Each castle generates mana at the beginning of each turn, which is added to the reserves of the nation that holds the castle. Monsters also have an upkeep cost; they consume mana every turn. Because of this, there is the option of deleting monsters.

Quest is not quite a gameplay mode, since they are not playable; they make the Rune Knight (and their troop) unavailable for a variable number of turns. During this time, the Rune Knight is involved in events (mostly random), which may benefit or hinder the player. Rulers cannot go on quests.

In the attack phase, each nation may send its own troops to adjacent enemy castles, which is treated as an attack. If the defending castle is occupied, a battle is marked to occur between the two groups of troops, unless the castle sending the troops is attacked first. (The order in which attacks process depends on the levels of the Rune Knights.) When battles are marked to occur, the game switches into the battle mode after the organize phase.

=== Battle mode ===
In this mode, each turn is a combat round. Battles take place on hexagonal grids; each unit (Rune Knight or monster) occupies one hexagon. Each unit, with rare exceptions, may act once each turn, and the units belonging to the same troop must act in sequence. A unit's action usually consists of movement followed by a physical attack, or of a magic spell/special attack. Magic spells cannot be used after moving, but some special attacks can.

Each side may bring at most three troops to a single battle, regardless of the number of troops that are attacking or defending the castle. Once a battle starts, the attacker has 12 turns to gain victory by defeating all of the defender's troops. A troop is defeated by having its leader reduced to 0 hit points, or when the leader retreats. If the ruler of a nation is reduced to 0 hit points or retreats, all other Rune Knights belonging to that nation retreat. If the attacker fails to gain victory within 12 turns, all their Rune Knights retreat.

In battle, each Rune Knight has an area around it called Rune Area. Outside of this area, the monsters belonging to the Rune Knight's troop become weaker. When a Rune Knight is reduced to 0 hit points or retreats, the monsters belonging to its troop may either retreat or be captured by the opposing side. A monster which is outside the leader's Rune Area has an increased chance of being captured.

Monsters which are reduced to 0 hit points are considered to be killed, and disappear forever. Rune Knights reduced to 0 hit points become unavailable to be used for one in-game month, but aren't affected otherwise.

Units and magic spells frequently have elements associated with them: red, blue, green, white, or black. Physical attacks and spells from units associated with a certain element are more effective against units associated with the opposing element (red opposes blue, white opposes black). Likewise, physical attacks and spells are less effective against units associated with the same element.

== Plot ==
The game begins with a scene showing Zemeckis, commander of the army of the Kingdom of Almekia, receiving a visit from a Rune Knight called Cador, who wields the title of "Death Knight". Zemeckis is convinced that he is being falsely accused of treason, and decides to rebel against the King of Almekia, Henguist. Zemeckis' rebellion is joined by other Rune Knights, and they successfully take over the nation of Almekia, renaming it the Esgares Empire. King Henguist dies at the hands of Cador, and the son of the King, Prince Lance, flees to the nearby Kingdom of Padstow with the Rune Knights who stayed loyal to the deceased king. These events are the trigger for the war between the nations of Forsena.

== Brigandine: Grand Edition ==
The expanded version of the game released in 2000 had many significant changes, including:

- Multiplayer game mode: allowing up to six players, each controlling a nation.
- The Esgares Empire became a fully playable nation, and gained plot cut scenes.
- Changes in battle mode gameplay:
  - Like in the Fire Emblem series, elements became based on the Rock, Paper, Scissors rule: red is effective against green, green is effective against blue, and blue is effective against red. White and black still oppose each other.
  - If, after 12 turns of battle, the attacker has a unit stationed on the defender's castle, the attacker now wins.
- Monsters became able to equip items.
- The player is redirected to a final boss when the continent is successfully conquered.
- The original 3D opening was replaced by an anime opening.
- Many dialog-only cut scenes were replaced by anime cut scenes.
- 3D battle animations replaced by simpler and faster 2D animations.
- Major changes to the soundtrack.
- New Rune Knights, character classes, items and monsters.
- Japanese voice acting was added, including the voice talents of Sōichirō Hoshi, Mitsuaki Madono, and Yuri Shiratori.

== Development ==
Hearty Robin, then known as Easlystaff, demonstrated the game at the September 1997 Tokyo Game Show.
