= Words Worth =

Japanese adult role-playing video game

- PC98 cover art

ワーズ･ワース
- Genre: Hentai, sword and sorcery
- Video game
- Developer: ELF Corporation
- Publisher: ELF Corporation; DMM Games (Digital)
- Genre: Eroge, role-playing video game
- Platform: Microsoft Windows
- Released: 1993-07-22 (PC98); 1993-08-27 (X68000); 1993-09-30 (TOWNS); 1999-03-25 (Win95); 2004-10-29 (XP); 2017-06-16 (Digital)
- Original video animation
- Directed by: Kan Fukumoto
- Produced by: Masatarō; Osamu Koshinaka
- Written by: Yōsei Morino
- Music by: Tōru Shura
- Studio: Green Bunny; Arms Corporation
- Licensed by: NA: NuTech Digital (former) Kitty Media
- Released: August 25, 1999 – November 25, 2000
- Episodes: 5
- Original video animation

Words Worth Gaiden
- Directed by: Hisashi Tomii
- Produced by: Masatarō; Osamu Koshinaka; Show Kumabe
- Written by: Yōsei Morino
- Music by: Tōru Shura
- Studio: Arms Corporation; Studio Kuma (Cooperation)
- Licensed by: NA: NuTech (former) Kitty Media
- Released: July 25, 2002 – September 25, 2002
- Episodes: 2

Words Worth (ワーズ･ワース, Wāzu Wāsu) is a Japanese adult role-playing video game originally released for NEC PC-98 computer systems, and remade for Microsoft Windows. The game's story is linear, with only one story decision near the end, leading to one of five different endings.

A five-part animated erotic direct-to-video series was adapted from the game's story. It also has a side story series, Words Worth Gaiden (ワーズ・ワース外伝) (known as Words Worth Outer Stories in the English release). The anime has the same general story, but the anime cuts out several characters and changes the plot mostly to create more sex scenes. The English dub is notable for featuring real life porn actresses Jenna Jameson and Nikki Dial. The rest of the English cast remained uncredited.

== Gameplay ==
The gameplay of Words Worth is similar to other fantasy games of the era such as The Elder Scrolls II: Daggerfall but with a tongue-in-cheek sexual undertone. It is a remake of the 1993 game of the same name and while the plot is near identical, the graphics, gameplay, and visuals have been greatly improved.

Words Worth is primarily a first-person dungeon crawler. Even though there are a few "friendly" areas, such as the hero Astro's bedroom and a town where the hero can rest and buy supplies, most of the game is spent in dungeon-like, maze-like areas (with an auto-map feature). There is no party in the game: Astro has to face the enemies alone. The enemies appear randomly. The 1999 remake has the players to click on the enemies to slash them and the combat is turn-based. The game has scenes with nudity and sexual situations.

Like most fantasy role playing games Words Worth has lots of focus on story and narrative plot points but unlike many contemporaries in the fantasy genre Words Worth is entirely voice acted. As the players play as a young hero trying to prove himself worthy while surrounded by vixens, the game falls into the style of many Japanese anime plots where a young awkward protagonist is surrounded by sexpot girls.

== Plot ==
The skill of sword-fighting is known to two tribes, the Tribes of Light (which consists of humans living on the world's surface) and Shadow (largely part-human-part-animal creatures and monsters living in an underground city, who enjoy a lifespan five times as long as the Tribe of Light and age one-fifth as quickly). The two tribes lived in peace and harmony, their domains separated by the "Words Worth" tablet—a huge monolith slab erected by an almighty creator. Although the tablet has writing on it, neither Tribe can read the text. One day, Words Worth was mysteriously destroyed by an unknown entity; its fragments were scattered among the domain of the Tribes of Shadow. The two Tribes blamed each other for the tablet's destruction, and started a war that has continued for 150 years (100 in the anime). Astral, prince of the Tribe of Shadow, desires to become a Swordsman of Shadow, but his father, King Wortoshika, forbids him to do so. He is engaged to Sharon, a beautiful swordswoman and Astral's childhood friend, who has feelings for Astral but wishes he were stronger.

== Characters ==
=== Tribe of Shadow ===
Astral
Prince of the Shadow realm, and heir to King Wortoshika. His name is based on Castor and is changed to 'Esterla' in the Media Blasters translation. He is a generic good-natured-but-oblivious video game protagonist who gains more experience over the course of the game. In the second half of the story, he is given the alias Pollux. In the anime, his character is more developed, being a natural swordsman who is also undisciplined and self-conscious (especially where his fiancée Sharon is concerned), and low on sexual morals. In both versions, he is eventually revealed to be the lost son of the legendary Light swordsman Pollux, after whom he was nicknamed because of his likeness with him. Voice actor: Kenichi Suzumura (credited as Ken Sozomura)

Sharon
One of the two most formidable officers (along with Kaiser) of the Shadow Realm army and a lifelong friend of Astral's. She is beautiful, but stern and commanding. Sharon is engaged to Astral, but is only attracted to men who are stronger than her in combat; she gradually falls in love with him as he proves his competence. The DOS version of the game included a sex scene with Sharon, but this was cut out in the Win95 edition. One of the game endings has Astral together with Sharon. In the Media Blasters translation, she is named Shalom. Voice actor: Rie Nakamizu

Nina
A catgirl who issues swordsman's licenses in the Shadow realm, and mother of Ariadne in the second half of the game. She has a secret crush on Astral. For many fans, she is the most-liked character in the series, likely due to her actions during the second half of the game. The DOS version of Nina was a clear parody of Lum, but her character was completely redesigned for the Win95 version. One of the game endings has Astral together with Nina. Voice actor: Emi Motoi (credited as Emi Nakano)

Kaiser
His name is the German word for 'emperor'. One of the two most formidable Shadow swordsmen, his pride and desire to win Sharon's heart often place him at odds with Astral. In the game, he attempts to seduce Sharon while she is under the influence of an aphrodisiac-poisoned wound caused by Fabris; in the anime, she more openly rejects his advances. In the game, he begins living with Sharon during the Miyu, Nina, and Delta's endings. Kaiser is renamed 'Caesar' in both official translations of the anime. Voice actor: Jōichi Sawada

Wortoshika
A large, muscular blue-skinned man, he is King of the Shadow tribe. His name could be a corruption of the term 'Wordseeker' due to the Japanese pronunciation. He is fiercely overprotective of his son. While ruthless and practical, he also has an honorable side. Voice actor: Takashi Tokorozawa

Tessio
Chief advisor to Wortoshika. Along with his Light counterpart, Menza, he is part of an evil entity which actually has caused the war between the two tribes. In the anime, they are aware of this, whereas in the game they are unwitting aspects of the dark entity. His name is based on Salvatore Tessio, and his look is based on Peter Clemenza; the opposite is true for Menza. Voice actor: Soichi Nagashima

Stallion
A lecherous half-horse, half-human officer of the Shadow tribe army. He believes that "women from the Tribe of Light are more attractive", and often takes female prisoners to a torture chamber to rape them. He is most famous in an internet meme for the quote, "Your resistance only makes my penis harder!" In the series' subsequent omake, he is seen marrying Eoria; this detail is briefly mentioned in all five of the game's endings. In the game, he has grown an incongruous white mustache in the second half. Voice actor: Shinya Furumoto

Hyde
A young Elf of the Shadow Tribe and Astral's best friend. Despite being a licensed swordsman, he is very timid and cowardly, and thus is ashamed of himself. In the game, he dies after succumbing to one of Club's machines; in the anime, he is slain by Sir Fabris after trying to stop him from raping Sharon. In both cases, his death affects Astral greatly.

Katra
A living, willful Skeleton Warrior and officer in the Shadow tribe army, he serves as a soldier and at times a messenger. Voice actor: Utako

Delta
A woman with gray, painted skin and bat wings, possibly a succubus. In the game, she only appears in the second half, and seems to often get stuck in erotic situations. In the anime, her curiosity gets the better of her when she follows Tessio and Menza, and is subsequently raped and hypnotized to serve the two in a plot against Astral. One of the game endings has Astral together with Delta (this was added in the Win95 edition); she marries Rigel if the player chooses Sharon's, Nina's, or Miyu's endings. Voice actor: Tsutomu Takashima (OVA) / Ben Takada (game)

Ariadne
Nina's and Astral's daughter. She only appears in the second half of the game. Uniting the blood from both the Light and Shadow Tribes, she ultimately plays the most vital role in reuniting the two tribes. Voice actor: Yoshino Kawayama

Carrot
A small fairy which can control monsters much larger than her. Appears in the second half of the game only, in which she is captured and molested by William, and marries Rigel during Delta's ending. She has a small cameo appearance in the anime's omake episode at Stallion's and Eoria's wedding.

Weiss
A friendly old person who dispenses advice to Astral. Weiss is male in the DOS version, female in the Win95 version, and does not appear in the anime.

=== Tribe of Light ===
Pollux
At the end of the first half of the game, Maria blasts Astral 20 years forward into the future, where he grows a beard and loses all memory of who he was. Eventually, he adopts the identity Pollux (named after a legendary swordsman whom he resembles) and fights for the Tribe of Light. In the game, he doesn't regain his memories until very near the end of the story, whereas in the anime he regains them much earlier. Voice actor: Aihime Yoshida

Pollux (Sr.)
A famous swordsman of the Tribe of Light, said to have died of illness but was in fact murdered, leading to his wife committing suicide. He had two children, a boy and a girl, who vanished after the attack. In the anime, it is revealed that Astral is his lost son, while the game also implies that Maria was the baby girl. The anime hints that he was killed by Wortoshika, while in the game, the combined form of Tessio and Menza was the culprit.

Miyu
A novice sorceress, daughter of Maria, and initially William's fiancé. She is named Mew in the NuTech translation and Mu in the game's fan-translation, and only appears in the second half of the game. Her life is saved by Pollux and slowly develops feelings for him. One of the game endings has Astral together with Miyu; in the Nina, Sharon and Delta endings she marries William. There are some indications that she actually might be Astral's niece (Maria and Astral are hinted to be siblings in the game) or daughter (from his raping her mother in the anime), and as a result a sexual relationship between them would be incestuous. Voice actor: Naoko Takano (credited as Mirei Yamano)

Maria
A sorceress, daughter of King Fabris, and mother of Miyu in the second half of the game, where she prefers to teleport enemies away rather than fight them. In the anime, she is raped by Astral after he falls into her prison cell. In the game, she is only an adopted child of Fabris, her biological parents being hinted to be the original Pollux and Maria, making her Astral's sister. Voice actor: Mimi Yamano

Maria (Sr.)
Wife of the original Pollux, who threw herself into a lake along with her baby girl after her husband's death and her son's disappearance. She is biological mother of Astral and, in the game, Maria. Her magic ring was passed down to Maria and later on to Miyu.

Fabris
An older and more experienced knight, stronger than both Kaiser and Sharon. He is revealed at the end of the first half to be the (adoptive) father of Maria and king of the Tribe of Light, shortly after Astral severs his right arm. In both versions of events, he lusts over Sharon after seeing her fight, actively attempting to rape her in the anime and coating one of his daggers with an aphrodisiac—which successfully injures Sharon—in the game. He is named Fabrees in the Media Blasters translation. Voice actor: Ikuya Fujiki

Menza
Chief advisor to Fabris. Along with his Shadow counterpart, Tessio, he is part of an evil entity which actually has caused the war between the two tribes. In the anime, they are aware of this, whereas in the game, they are unwitting aspects of the dark entity. His name is based on Peter Clemenza, and his look is based on Salvatore Tessio—the opposite is true for Tessio.

Epo
A blue-haired swordswoman, named April in the fan-translation and Media Blasters translation. In the game, she is forced to strip by Astral and starts bawling (which scares Astral away); 20 years later, in the second half of the game, she becomes a shopkeeper in town. The DOS version of Epo is a parody of Nadia from Nadia: The Secret of Blue Water, but her character was completely redesigned for the Win95 version. Epo has a small cameo appearance in the anime series as a stall owner, but is one of the main characters in the Gaiden anime, where it documents her adventures which lead her to conclude that the life of a swordswoman was not for her. She gets lost in the realm of the Shadow tribe and runs into monsters who sexually assaulted her at every turn. Her final monster encounter was Stallion, who begins molesting her, but is interrupted when Astral falls from a cliff and knocks Stallion into the water. Epo, still aroused by the sensations of Stallion's treatment of her, invites Astral to take her virginity.

Sabrina
A dark-skinned, taciturn female knight, Sabrina is tortured, interrogated, and molested when she is captured by the Tribe of Shadows. She is strong-willed and would do nearly anything to destroy the enemy Tribe of Shadows. In the second half of the game, she becomes the mother of Rita. She also appears in the Gaiden anime, where she is Persia's dominant lesbian lover.

Rita
A dark-skinned Light tribe swordswoman, and daughter of Sabrina who appears in the game's second half only. In the game, she is timid and reluctant to fight. At some point, she gets her posterior trapped in a hole in the ground; Pollux notices it in the ceiling and attempts to attack it. Later on, he jokingly calls her "butt-girl". In the anime, she is much more outgoing, and has a chance encounter with Wortoshika. Rita attempts to defeat him in the name of the Tribe of Light, but finds that he is too powerful and states that a death by him would be an honorable one. Instead, Wortoshika attempts to procreate in order to produce an heir following Astral's disappearance. It is implied that during this encounter, Rita and Wortoshika develop strong feelings for one another; Wortoshika offers her a home in the Shadow Tribe if the Tribe of Light refuses to take her back, and Rita sheds tears of anguish when Wortoshika later dies in the anime. Voice actor: Chiyo

Persia
Servant and student of Sabrina who does not appear to enjoy sword-fighting. She is an adolescent in the game, but a juvenile adult in the Gaiden anime, where she has sexual encounters with both Astral and Sabrina.

Silvanna
A tomboyish fencer, possibly a cousin of Maria. She is named Silverna in the NuTech translation. In the game, she is captured and raped by Stallion. In the second half, she is the mother of Eoria. In the anime, she was captured along with Maria during the initial encounter with the Tribe of Shadow and is molested by two pig guards; Maria comes to her rescue before they can go through with their plans to gang-rape her.

Eoria
Daughter of Silvanna, whom she strongly resembles in both appearance and personality. She appears only in the second half of the game. Stallion attempts to rape her in the second half by giving her an aphrodisiac, but Pollux stops Stallion and as a result, Eoria comes on to Pollux instead, snapping out of the drug-induced trance in mid-kiss. In an omake of the anime series, she is shown marrying Stallion, a detail mentioned in all five of the game's endings.

Bellabella
A nymphomaniac sorceress who uses magic mushrooms for both magical and sexual purposes, and because of this appears to age very slowly (having exactly the same appearance in the second half of the story 20 years later). She is one of the two characters who is shown to have actual sexual intercourse with Astral in the game (the other being Nina). She is named Belladonna in the game's fan translation and does not appear in the anime.

Club
A master trap-maker, he is named Kaleb in the fan-translation. In the game, he is one of the initial party to get captured by the Shadow Tribe (along with Fabris, Dark, Silvanna, Sabrina, and Maria), and later kills Hyde. In the anime, he has a very small unnamed appearance, piloting one of his war machines. Voice actor: Akio Suyama

Dark
A fearless and brave swordswoman. In the second half, she is the mother of Vega. She does not appear in the anime and is renamed Arkia in the fan-translation.

Norman
A somewhat pretentious swordsman, he has a power move that parodies the kamehameha from Dragon Ball. Boyfriend of Epo, he is later killed by Astral. Norman makes a small appearance in the Gaiden anime as the injured boyfriend of Epo who attempts to find her when she falls in the river and gets lost.

Vega
Daughter of Dark, she appears only in the second half of the game. Vega often contemplates finding a boyfriend and starting a family. In the DOS version, she is a swordswoman who has a sexual encounter with Pollux; in the Win95 version, she is an archer and has no such encounter. She has a small cameo appearance in the anime's omake episode at Stallion's and Eoria's wedding.

Algol
A cowardly swordsman who is very greedy and attracted to gold. He has a habit of calling people by absurd names and appears in the second half of the game. In all of the game's endings, he marries one of the four unnamed female shopkeepers (though which one is never specified). Algol is not present in the anime.

Rigel
A dark-skinned lecherous swordsman, Rigel appears in the second half of the game. He believes that "women from the Tribe of Shadow are more attractive", making him somewhat of a counterpart to Stallion. In fact, he and Stallion fight over Delta at one point. Rigel makes a very brief cameo appearance in the anime. He marries Carrot in the Delta and harem endings, and Delta herself in all others.

William
Son of Fabris, and fiancé of Miyu, he appears as a very young child standing up to Astral in the first half; 20 years later, he has "matured" into a cowardly swordsman who seizes credit for Pollux's achievements. William occasionally displays pedophilic tendencies (as evidenced by his treatment of Carrot).

== Spin-offs ==
=== Words Worth no Hitobito ===
Words Worth no Hitobito (ワーズ・ワースの人々) is a cross-over between Words Worth and The Mystery of Nonomura Hospital. In the first half of the game, Umihara, the main protagonist of The Mystery of Nonomura Hospital, enters the world of Words Worth as summoned by Wortoshika. The game takes place in the intervening 20 years between Astral's disappearance and reappearance. In the second half, Sharon from Words Worth comes into the world of Nonomura Hospital and has a sexual affair with Umihara.

== Release history ==
The original video game was made by ELF Corporation in 1993. The game was remade for Windows 95 in 1999, with changed character designs, different gameplay, full-voice added to the supporting characters, 3D polygon graphics, and an opening animation sequence. That same year, the anime adaptation was also released. The series was originally released in English by NuTech Digital in 1999, but the license was lost due to NuTech being sued for failure to pay royalties. According to AnimeNation, that license was awarded in 2007 to Media Blasters, which released the series under Kitty Media.

The Canada Border Services Agency ruled in 2007 that Words Worth is obscene under subsection 163(8) of the Criminal Code and is prohibited from being brought into the country.

In 2003, Words Worth was released in German by Trimax as Am Ende des Lichtes (At the End of the Light). Trimax also released Words Worth Gaiden in 2009 as Die Kriegerinnen des Lichts (The She-Warriors of Light).

== Anime episode list (1999–2000) ==
| No. | Title | Original release date |
|---|---|---|
| 1 | "The Legend of Light and Shadow" "Hika to Kage no Densetsu" (光と影の伝説) | August 25, 1999 |
In their perpetual war against the Shadow People, the Light Tribe under their king Fabris launches yet another assault against the underground realm. Eager to prove his prowess as a warrior and his worth to his fiancé Sharon, Astral asks his father, King Wortoshika, for a swordsman's license, but is refused since Wortoshika secretly has other plans for him. With the aid of Nina, who has been harboring a crush on him, Astral obtains a license illegally. On his way out of the palace, he stumbles into the dungeon of Light Tribe prisoner Maria, whom he naïvely rapes.
| 2 | "Pantheon of Play" "Kamigami no Tawamure" (神々の戯れ) | November 25, 1999 |
After recovering from her ordeal, Maria frees the other Light Tribe prisoners. Astral proceeds to the battlefield, but is diverted when he has to rescue Nina from a monster and has sex with her after she confesses her feelings for him. Arriving at the battlefield, he sees Fabris killing his friend Hyde and preparing to rape Sharon, so he rushes in and cuts off Fabris's arm. Maria then arrives, and in retaliation she blasts Astral with an unpredictable power spell, which inexplicably casts him to the surface and 20 years into the future.
| 3 | "The Legendary Swordsman" "Densetsu no Kenshi" (伝説の剣士) | May 25, 2000 |
Amnesic, Astral wanders the Light Tribe's realm, where he is mistaken for Pollux, a long-lost legendary warrior. After saving Fabris' granddaughter Mew from a rabid bear, he is introduced to the king, who decides to exploit his lack of memory to initiate a decisive last strike against the Shadow Tribe, which has sealed off its borders. After rescuing Mew from another monster, he has sex with her before heading for the border. However, Menza and Tessio, the chief advisors to the Light and Shadow Kings, are secretly two parts of a sinister creature which has destroyed the Word Worth Tablet in the first place and now grows worried that Wortoshika has been collecting its pieces in order to learn its secret. Delta eavesdrops on them, but they catch her, rape her, then brainwash her into serving them.
| 4 | "Light, Shadow and Darkness" "Hika, Kage Soshite Yami" (光、影そして闇) | August 25, 2000 |
Delta seduces Astral and then tries to kill him until the Light swordswoman Rita drives her away. After unwittingly opening the borders of the Shadow Realm for Fabris, Astral descends into the underground in the company of Rita. The two become separated, and Astral encounters Sharon in battle, while Rita ends up in the Words Worth chamber and is claimed by Wortoshika, who wishes to sire a child who unites the blood of Light and Shadow and would be the only one who can decipher the tablet. Tessio and Menza make their move and assault Wortoshika and Rita to prevent this from happening.
| 5 | "Glimmer's End" "Kirameki no Hate" (煌めきの果て) | November 25, 2000 |
While battling Sharon, Astral finally recovers his memories and makes love with Sharon, who has been harboring feelings for him since her rescue from Fabris. Things get only a little complicated when Mew makes her way into the Shadow Realm in order to be at Astral's/Pollux's side and Astral discovers that he has sired a daughter with Nina. Delta attacks them, but Mew uses her magic to cure her brainwashing. After learning of the dark creature and its intentions, Light and Shadow join forces and defeat it. Before Wortoshika succumbs to his injuries, he reveals Astral to be a Light Tribe child once kidnapped and raised by Wortoshika to facilitate the deciphering of the Words Worth Tablet. With these conditions, Astral and Nina's daughter, Ariadne, manages to reveal the tablet's secret, uniting the two tribes again.

=== Special episodes (2002–2009) ===
The series spawned two additional Gaiden OVA episodes and one comedic Omake episode. The Gaiden episodes take place in the final third of the episode "Pantheon of Play", the Omake following the conclusion of the original series.

| No. | Title | Original release date |
|---|---|---|
| 1 | "Outer Story: Within The Furious Waters" "Honryū no naka de…" (外伝 前編 - 奔流の中で…) | July 25, 2002 |
April is knocked into a river following a battle. As her boyfriend Norman searches for her, she is molested by a frog monster before escaping and is chased by Tessio. Astral observes Sabrina being raped by Shadow Tribe soldiers before she and her girlfriend Persia escape with Astral and Stallion in hot pursuit. Astral is distracted by three succubi and has sex with them, draining his energy. Stallion catches April and molests her. While Persia is separated from Sabrina, she finds Astral and nurses him back to health. Sabrina returns, angrily attacks Astral, and knocks him off a cliff.
| 2 | "Outer Story: Towards the Fierce Waves" "Dotō no naka de…" (外伝 外編 - 怒涛の中へ…) | September 25, 2002 |
Just as Stallion is about to rape April, Astral falls on him and knocks him away. April is so aroused that she has sex with Astral. Sabrina tortures and rapes Persia as punishment for helping an enemy. After they finish, April decides she is not meant be a soldier and abandons the war. Astral finds Menza sneaking around and follows him. In a chamber, Persia and Sabrina intercept Astral and lock the doors. Sabrina fights him until she slips and is knocked out. Persia then fights him until he breaks her spear. Part of the ceiling collapses from cannon fire outside and Astral is knocked out while pushing her out of the way. Persia tries to kill him, but cannot and cries. He wakes up and has sex with her. Afterwards, she pretends to talk in her sleep to tell him that Sabrina's sword unlocks the room, allowing him to escape.
| Omake | "Sharon's Home Cooking vs. Mew's Cosplay vs. Nina's Established Fact—Three-Cornered Battle" (特典映像 - シャロンの手料理 vs ミューのコスプレ vs ニーナの既成事実 三つ巴の決戦) | December 18, 2009 |
While the Tribes of Light and Shadow have peacefully reunited and are living together on the surface, life in Astral's household has not gotten any easier as Sharon, Nina, and Mew still fiercely vie for his attention. Sharon tries to impress him by cooking, Nina argues that she deserves him because of their daughter Ariadne, and Mew tries to impress him by cosplaying as a catgirl. Just as they come to blows, they discover that Astral just had sex with Delta. Enraged, the three beat him up. Notes: Released as part of a Premium Collectors DVD box in Japan. No U.S. release.
