= Advancer Tina =

1996 Japanese science fiction anime OVA

アドバンサー・ティナ (Adobansā Tina)
- Genre: Science fiction, horror, hentai
- Original video animation
- Directed by: Kan Fukumoto
- Produced by: Masanori Kobayashi; Osamu Koshinaka
- Written by: Wataru Amano
- Music by: Ann Fu
- Studio: Dandelion
- Licensed by: NA: Kitty Media
- Released: August 21, 1996
- Runtime: 45 minutes
- Episodes: 1

Advancer Tina (アドバンサー・ティナ, Adobansā Tina) is a 1996 Japanese science fiction, horror and hentai original video animation (OVA) directed by Kan Fukumoto and animated by Dandelion. It follows a convicted criminal tasked with investigating a potentially habitable planet where several previous expeditions have disappeared. A novelization by the anime's screenwriter, Wataru Amano, was published the same year.

== Plot ==
In 3113 of the New Space Century, three thousand years after pollution has rendered Earth uninhabitable, humanity travels through space in search of habitable planets and natural resources. An interplanetary government known as the Domestic Union of Arms (DUA) governs human settlements. Professional explorers known as Advancers undertake dangerous planetary surveys. After several expeditions to the planet Omega-13 fail to return, Mugal, a DUA official, recruits Tina Owen, an Advancer serving a 2,000-year prison sentence for the unauthorized destruction of a "foul" planet. He promises to cancel her sentence if she discovers a habitable region on Omega-13.

Tina travels to space station M-75, where a young man named Akira Sato helps her fend off a group of attackers and guides her to a black market. There, she outbids another Advancer, Garuda, for a spaceship named Spider. She befriends Frill, an orphaned refugee with psychic abilities who can communicate with humans, animals and plants. Frill becomes attached to Tina, who initially intends to leave her at the station for her own safety. Through Frill's telepathic abilities, Tina explores her fragmentary childhood memories, which suggest a possible connection to the legendary planet Noah. Tina has no clear memories of her life before entering an Advancer training centre at approximately fourteen years of age. Both Frill and Akira join the expedition, the latter hoping to avenge his family, who were murdered by Ortega, a former Advancer turned pirate believed to have travelled to Omega-13.

During their journey, Tina and her companions discover Garuda's spaceship under attack by a tentacled alien creature emerging from a drifting vessel. Tina and Akira board the vessel, where Garuda and his three female companions have taken refuge. Two of the women are killed by the creature, but Garuda and Joanna are rescued. The group also recovers a voice recorder revealing the discovery of substantial gold deposits on Omega-13 and a confrontation involving Ortega, who apparently sought to monopolize the planet's wealth.

After landing on the apparently barren planet, Tina investigates its unusual environment. Frill reveals that she is of mixed human and Shamoan ancestry and senses the presence of numerous hostile plants. Meanwhile, Garuda and Akira investigate what appears to be an excavation site. The explorers are attacked by alien organisms, and Garuda sacrifices himself to help the others escape, asking Tina to protect Joanna.

Unbeknownst to the others, Joanna has been infected by the alien creature. Aboard Tina's spaceship, she transforms into a monstrous hybrid of the creature and Ortega, which the protagonists defeat. After Tina submits her report on Omega-13, Mugal informs her that her sentence will be reduced to 1,000 years upon verification of her findings. Frill and Akira remain with Tina as members of her crew while her next assignment is being considered.

== Production and release ==
Advancer Tina was directed and storyboarded by Kan Fukumoto from a screenplay by Wataru Amano, with Shigeru Yamazaki also involved in the direction. Hironobu Saito served as character designer and animation director, while Kenji Teraoka provided mechanical designs. The music was composed by Ann Fu. Animation was produced by Dandelion, with Green Bunny and Beam Entertainment also credited as production companies. Beam Entertainment was subsequently acquired by Happinet in 1999. The producers included Masanori Kobayashi and Osamu Koshinaka.

The 45-minute science fiction horror OVA was released in Japan on August 21, 1996, and was distributed in North America by Media Blasters under its Kitty Media label in 1997. In April 1997, the Quebec film classification authority restricted a 48-minute version of the anime to viewers aged 18 and over on account of its violent and erotic content.

Both censored and uncensored editions were made available in North America. In June 1997, Media Blasters founder John Sirabella discussed plans to allow customers who had purchased the censored edition to exchange it for the uncensored version, following requests from retailers and viewers. The anime was also included in the compilation Best of Kitty Volume 1.

Although the ending leaves open the possibility of further adventures involving Tina, no sequel was produced.

== Related media ==
A novelization of the anime, written by its screenwriter Wataru Amano, was published in Japan in 1996 as the thirteenth volume of the JoyMate series.

== Reception ==
Writing in the third edition of The Anime Encyclopedia (2015), Jonathan Clements and Helen McCarthy considered the anime's premise promising, comparing its mission undertaken by a convicted criminal to The Dirty Dozen (1967) and its depiction of interstellar adventures to Dirty Pair. They also identified similarities to the Alien franchise, particularly in the depiction of the extraterrestrial creature and its reproductive cycle. However, they felt that the film soon became a "tacky exploitation movie". They criticized the disproportionate amount of time devoted to assembling the crew rather than exploring Omega 13, the supporting characters' limited narrative functions, the predictable ending, and the overall quality of the production, concluding that the film was "shoddily assembled from start to finish".

Clements and McCarthy also referred to Advancer Tina in their discussions of other pornographic science fiction anime. They likened Alien from the Darkness (1997) to Advancer Tina, noting similarities to the Alien franchise. They regarded both works as unsuccessful later examples of a genre already represented by Battle Can Can (1987).

Jim Cox, writing for the horror website Grimoire of Horror in 2023, offered a more favorable assessment. He praised the detailed character designs, fluid animation, action sequences and cyberpunk aesthetics. He considered Tina a multidimensional protagonist, highlighting her attempts to learn about her past and reconcile her human and cyborg identities. Cox also appreciated the film's worldbuilding and its combination of science fiction, body horror and adult animation, while acknowledging that its sexually explicit content limited its mainstream appeal.

== Analysis ==
Media scholar Holger Briel, in his discussion of the historical and cultural origins of sexually explicit imagery in Japanese popular culture, identified Advancer Tina as an example of tentacle erotica, alongside such anime as La Blue Girl and Alien from the Darkness. The anime's imagery, including a scene depicting sexual violence against women dressed as nuns, has also been discussed in Anime and Philosophy: Wide Eyed Wonder (2010).
