= Él (video game) =

Japanese adult visual novel

- Él/Elle
- Original box art for the PC-9801 Japanese release of Elle.

エル (él)
- Created by: ELF Corporation
- Video game
- Developer: ELF Corporation
- Publisher: ELF Corporation; DMM Games (Digital)
- Genre: Eroge, role-playing video game
- Platform: Microsoft Windows
- Released: 1991-06-13 (MSX2, PC98, X68000, TOWNS); 2000-09-29 (Win95); 2017-06-23 (Digital)
- Original video animation
- Directed by: Katsuma Kanazawa
- Produced by: Osamu Koshinaka; Taro Miyabi; Akio Sakai
- Written by: Katsuma Kanazawa
- Music by: Shojo-han Dai
- Studio: Arms; Himajin (Note: Credited alongside Arms for Animation Production (アニメーション制作) in the opening credits, and as Animation Production Assistance (アニメーション制作協力) in the ending credits.)
- Licensed by: NA: NuTech (former) Kitty Media
- Released: April 25, 2001 – July 25, 2001
- Episodes: 2

Elle, also known as Él (エル, eru), is a Japanese adult visual novel developed by ELF Corporation which was originally released on June 13, 1991. A remake produced by ELF Corporation retitled Él was released on September 29, 2000. Green Bunny produced an anime original video animation titled Él which was released in two volumes in 2001. The series depicts the survivors of a nuclear war that are gathered in a single, tightly monitored city.

== Plot ==
In December 1999, a nuclear war devastates the Earth and renders most of the world inhospitable. To ensure the survival of humanity the "Megaroasu plan" is carried out, but a terrorist organization called the Black Widow attacks and tries to disrupt the plan. The story takes place in 2008. The player takes the role of an unnamed Hero with an unknown past who is an expert marksman. The heroine is El Miles, and includes an ensemble of minor characters to advance the plot. The game is a simple click adventure with only one ending as with many games of the genre.

For the 2000 remake, the story was the same with the exception of the setting being refocused to 2030. The graphics were updated and included three-dimensional computer graphics. The script was dubbed by a cast of professional voice actors, but the cast credits were private and not released.

== OVA plot ==
After a nuclear war triggered by environmental pollution, a group of survivors start the Megaro Earth Project, a city built under a dome to protect the last fragments of humanity. El Miles is a "sniper" – a policewoman defending the city against the terrorist organization Black Widow. El has been placed in charge of protecting Parsley, a pop singer nearly raped by Black Widow operatives. The singer then finds herself falling in love with El, and attempts to seduces her. El discovers that some of her fellow snipers are becoming Black Widow operatives, and she is constantly tormented not only by their leader Gimmick, but also by unusual blackouts and of unexplained visions of another reality. At the end of the second episode, the whole world El Miles lived in was actually just a 'created dream' and only El and a man named Joe are the last of humanity which was disrupted by Parsley.

== Releases ==
The first release, titled Elle was originally released on June 13, 1991. A remake produced by ELF Corporation retitled Él was released on September 29, 2000. The original release was on PC-9801, the software was on four 5" 2HD floppy disks. The remake was released for Windows 95, 98, Me, 2000, and XP on CD.

Green Bunny produced an anime original video animation titled Él which was released in two volumes in 2001. Nutech Digital acquired the rights to the Él OVA in 2001. The English release of the volumes 1 and 2, and the box set would follow in January 2002, featuring an English dub which included the voice talents of adult actresses Shelbee Myne and Lola.

OVA credits include:

- Kazuma Kanezawa: Director, Screenwriter
- Masaki Kawai: Original Character Design
- Takeo Takahashi: Art Director, Storyboard, Character Designer, Supervision
- Yukio Segami: Character Designer, Animation Director
- ARMS and Green Bunny: Production.

== Reception ==
Chris Beveridge reviewed both English localizations of the series. The Nutech Digital release was originally reviewed in 2002 and was positive, noting the strong visuals with only a few seconds of cross coloration on the second episode. The Kitty Media release was also reviewed favorably, among its differences from the Nutech Digital release was redubbing the work for release. The strong points of the OVA were its writing and execution of the surprise ending, but the large cast of characters resulted in poor development of secondary characters. The visuals from the original release do not hold up when compared to newer works in the 2007 review because of the increasing industry standards.
