= Sexfriend =

Japanese hentai game and anime

セックスフレンド (Sekkusufurendo)
- Genre: Hentai
- Video game
- Developer: CODEPINK / STONE HEADS
- Genre: Visual novel, eroge
- Platform: Windows
- Released: March 20, 2003
- Original video animation
- Directed by: Kurige Katsura
- Produced by: Riki; Toshihide Ota
- Written by: Kurige Katsura
- Music by: Toru Yukawa
- Studio: CODEPINK, Green Bunny
- Licensed by: Kitty Media
- Released: January 1, 2004
- Runtime: 30 minutes per episode
- Episodes: 2

Sexfriend (セックスフレンド, Sekkusufurendo) is a hentai computer game and anime. Sexfriend focuses on the protagonist, Tomohiro Takabe, who has his first sexual encounter in the nurse's office after school with his classmate, Mina Hayase. He eventually desires a real romantic relationship, not just "friends with benefits". Another student, Kaori Nonomiya, sees Tomohiro and Mina having sex and runs off disappointed because she also loves Tomohiro. She eventually joins them in a threesome.

== Cast ==
- Wasshoi Taro: Takabe Tomohiro
- Dynamite Ami: Mina Hayase
- Kanari Kanzaki: Kaori Nonomiya
- Erena Kaibara: Nurse Taeko Nonomiya
- Bokyle: Otoko, Additional Voices

== Credits ==
- Kurige Katsura: Director, Screenplay, Storyboard
- Shida Tadashi: Animation Director, Character Designer
- Toru Yukawa: Music
- Ayumi Shimazu: Art Direction
- Kanashi Bari: Color Design
- Dynamite Ami: Theme Song Performer
