= NuTech Digital =

American entertainment company

NuTech Digital California
- Type: Private company
- Founded: 1993
- Defunct: 2007
- Headquarters: Van Nuys, California, United States
- Area served: United States
- Key people: Lee Kasper, Joe Giarmo
- Website: nutechentertainment.com

NuTech Digital, Inc. was a company that licensed and distributed karaoke products, general entertainment films (action-adventure, horror, and comedy), and children's animated films. In 2005, Nutech became focused on producing and distributing live concert footage. IT is not to be confused with the Canadian Nutech Digital Inc. in Winnipeg,

== History ==
In 1993, NuTech Entertainment, Inc. was founded for the purpose of licensing and distributing karaoke software. In 1997, NuTech Digital, Inc. was founded for the purpose of licensing and distributing films. In 1999, the two entities merged into NuTech Digital, Inc. and NuTech Entertainment, Inc. was dissolved in 2001.

In 2003, Nutech developed a digital rights management application that would work with DVD download, rentals and peer-to-peer networks like KaZaA, Limewire, and Morpheus. The application was aimed at preventing piracy and included the capabilities to self-delete works from the computer after a set number of plays or days from download. In November, NuTech signed a deal for exclusive rights to Happinet Pictures works in North America, Canada, and Mexico. The agreement was made after the initial success of Words Worth and resulted in obtaining rights to the final two episodes and works like Immoral Sisters and Genmukan.

In March 2004, NuTech entered into a distribution deal with Liberty International Entertainment Inc. for 65 classical music titles. In May, it secured a million dollar contract with Dollar Tree stores for its DVD content. In June, NuTech became aware that its stock was listed on the Berlin-Bremen Stock Exchange without their consent or permission. NuTech enlisted U.S. attorneys Richardson & Patel to remove the listing, which was done so five days later. NuTech's official stance was that this was a shorting scheme to drive the cost of the stock down.

In 2005, NuTech had begun moving away from distribution of animation to focus on producing and distributing music concerts, but during this time hentai titles accounted for 59% of its sales. In May, NuTech signed a multi-year agreement to deliver its content through CinemaNow's broadband video-on-demand service. In November 2005, Ken Groove Media sued NuTech over $300,000 in bounced checks and violation of contract for NuTech's digital streaming and possibly violating its pricing guidelines of the contract. As a result of the lawsuit, the rights of 34 titles were transferred to Adult Source Media.

In January 2006, NuTech filed a lawsuit against rapper Mike Jones, claiming at least $116,846 in damages after Mike Jones allegedly failed to show up for an October 10 concert. Also in 2006, NuTech entered into a licensing agreement over its content to MusicGiants. The company closed its operations in 2007.

== Divisions ==
=== Anime Division ===
In 2001, NuTech announced that it has acquired the rights to D+Vine (Luv), él, Angels in the Court, Inmu 2, Karakuri Ninja Girl, Words Worth, Bizarre Cage, Black Mail 2, Immoral Sisters, Isaku, Isaku Respect, Luv Wave, Pure Mail, School of Darkness and Yu-No. As a result of the 2005 lawsuit 34 titles were transferred to Adult Source Media; these titles included: Chu², Class Reunion Again, Dark Shell, Dream Hazard, Harvest Night, Magical Kanan, Magic Kanan Special (Summer Camp), Maids in Dream, MaMa, Momiji, Pianist, Princess Memory, and Romance in the Flash of a Sword.

Listed under the Digital Versatile and Nutech brands, NuTech was ranked the fifth leading supplier for 2002 anime releases, with 54 releases. NuTech's rivals included Pioneer with 133 titles, ADV Films with 89 titles, Media Blasters with 62 titles, and Funimation with 55 titles released for 2002.

The titles it acquired have since been redistributed to other companies, such as Critical Mass and Kitty Media.

=== NuTech Platinum Concert Series ===
NuTech Platinum Concert Series was a division created in 2001 to capitalize the market for DVDs of live concert performances, capturing them with the company's equipment. Contracts included NuTech to retain internet and television broadcast rights to the performances. NuTech teamed up with Morris Marketing, a well-known Hollywood public relations agency, to promote the new division.

=== Telco operations ===
In 2007, NuTech purchased Jump Communications assets which were valued at $3.7 million with the intention of expanding their market and to better compete in the telecommunications market.

== Business reports ==
In 2002, 2QY sales were $1,142,741; 3QY sales $902,070. In 2003, 2QY sales were $966,815; 3QY sales $956,981.

== Staff ==
- Lee Kasper, chairman, president and CEO of NuTech Digital.
- Joe Giarmo, Vice President and Head of Production for NuTech
