= Devadasy =

2000 anime OVA about a giant human-piloted robot

- De:vadasy

創世聖紀デヴァダシー (Sosei Seiki Devadashi)
- Genre: Mecha
- Created by: Kazumi Fujita
- Original video animation
- Directed by: Nobuhiro Kondō
- Produced by: Hiroaki Inoue; Kinya Watanabe; Ikuo Satō
- Written by: Shō Tokimura
- Studio: AIC; Studio Gazelle
- Licensed by: NA: Media Blasters
- Released: November 25, 2000 – January 25, 2001
- Runtime: 23 minutes each
- Episodes: 3
- Video game
- Publisher: Green Bunny
- Genre: Strategy, dating sim
- Platform: Windows 95/98
- Released: April 28, 2000

De:vadasy (創世聖紀デヴァダシー, Sosei Seiki Devadashi) is a 2000 PC video game and anime OVA about a giant human-piloted robot. The series was produced by AIC and animated by Studio Gazelle.

== Plot ==
When aliens invade, the Earth's only effective defense is the giant robot Devadasy. Devadasy is piloted by male protagonist Kei and one of two female co-pilots, Misako and Naoki, and is powered by their "sexual energy".

=== OVA series ===
425 days since enemy landing, pilot Kei Anno is deployed in a Devadasy to counter an alien nanomachine attack on a city, but he deviates from orders following a psychic signal. This turns out to be another mecha, piloted by his colleague Amara, which was buried in a mountain of alien matter and now acts seemingly against humanity. Kei attacks eagerly, but both mechas receive heavy damage, and their command center remotely shuts them down. Both pilots are safely recovered, allowing Kei and Amara to have a romantic reencounter. However, the alien nanomachine mass reactivates her abandoned mecha, forcing them to launch the first with Kei and Amara together, and another female pilot, Naoki Matsudo, volunteers jealously to take her place.

Throughout the first episode, the story goes back to 53 days before, when Kei and his childhood friend Naoki are recruited by Misako Takashina for Spirits, an international organization that protects humanity through the use of Devadasy. Kei is moved along with Misako and six other girls to a house where young pilots are trained, after which he is introduced to a mysterious dark-skinned girl, Amara Minakushi, chosen to pilot the Devadasy with Key. The boy has been previously having erotic dreams with Amara, highlighting a psychic connection between them.

The second episode opens with a flashback showing an alien artifact crashing in the Earth's prehistoric times. The origin of the alien invasion is revealed to be a massive black octahedron that arrived to the planet back then and is returning now. Twenty years before present time, an expedition led by Kei's grandfather is also shown to find a hibernating Amara in an ancient temple in Tibet, as well as the Devadasy and prophecies about the invasion. Upon discovering this in the pilot school, and under effect of special drugs, Kei suffers headaches and altered behavior, even trying to rape Naoki, so Takashina seduces him to obtain his sperm, finding that Devadasy's nanomachines are affecting him.

Upon being deployed against the corrupted Devadasy, Kei deduces the alien mass is dying and attacks viciously, but a flashback of the rape attempt disturbs him, and their enemy capitalizes to infect their Devadasy. Kei eventually finishes the mission, but Kei is left traumatized, only snapping back to go have sex with Amara.

In the third chapter, Spirits is made part of the United Nations, which order Devadasy to be moved to China. However, upon activating Devadasy in Japan, the infection manifests, making it generate nanomachines. Amara tells Kei that this isn't the seed she and Devadasy planted on him, and that it isn't their child. Instead, despite their efforts, Devadasy releases a shining alien parasite that tries to absorb them. Takashina and officer Yamada self-destroy the evacuated Spirits base, which interrupts the process, but the alien absorbs instead the explosion's energy and takes the physical form of a mecha, carrying a captured Naoki as its pilot.

The alien mecha attacks the weakened Devadasy, but Kei manages to pilot it and pierce the enemy cockpit. In a seat above Naoki, a biomechanical doppelganger of Kei speaks telepathically to him through Amara, telling him that he was created for an eternal future, to create new life out of humanity and itself, Devadasy. It's also possibly implied that Amara is Naoki's mother. Ultimately, Kei destroys the alien and Naoki is saved, but the Spirits command muses the war has just begun.

The last and ambiguous scene, possibly a dream, shows a younger Kei and Amara in school, with her laughing at him being scolded in class, before her laugh turns mysterious.

== Release history ==
De:vadasy was initially released in Japan marketed as an all-age appropriate title, but was soon changed to being classified as an adult-only title. Though the anime contains no explicit on-screen sexual content, the change to being classified as an adult title was made due to implied off-screen sex and significant innuendo, as well as changes in Japanese law around the time of its release. No edits were made to the content of the anime in the change from an all-age to adult title.

De:vadasy has been released in the United States by Media Blasters under their non-adult Anime Works label.

== Reception ==
De:vadasy has received mostly negative reception from critics, who criticized the series for being overly derivative of Neon Genesis Evangelion. Mike Toole, writing for Anime News Network, described the series as "cheap" and "shoddy", and not worthy of a purchase even at bargain prices. Carlos Ross, writing for THEM Anime, was particularly critical of the protagonist Kei, who he described as "completely unlikeable". Ross came to a similar conclusion about the series as Toole, saying that the anime is possibly not worth watching even for free. Chris Beveridge of AnimeOnDVD.com was somewhat more positive about the series, suggesting that it would have been interesting if it was expanded into a full television series.
