= Angels in the Court =

Japanese visual novel

- Cover art of the original game

コートの中の天使達 (Court no Naka no Tenshi-tachi)
- Genre: Harem, Erotica
- Video game
- Developer: Pinpai
- Publisher: Pink Pineapple
- Genre: Visual novel
- Platform: Windows
- Released: September 22, 1999
- Original video animation
- Directed by: Satoru Sumisaki
- Produced by: Saburo Omiya
- Written by: Muto Yasuyuki
- Music by: Mari Adachi; Mie Sonozaki
- Studio: Pink Pineapple
- Licensed by: NuTech Digital
- Released: October 27, 2000 – December 15, 2000
- Runtime: 30 minutes
- Episodes: 2
- Original video animation

Kaette Kita Court no Naka no Tenshitachi
- Directed by: Kenrana Namisato
- Music by: Kahoru Sasajima; Kimiko Koyama; Mari Adachi; Anda Zakimie
- Studio: Pink Pineapple
- Released: October 26, 2001 – January 25, 2002
- Runtime: 30 minutes
- Episodes: 2
- Novel series

Court no Naka no Tenshi-tachi: Ano Hitomi Niaitakute
- Written by: Muto Yasuyuki
- Published by: KSS Books
- Original run: August 30, 2001 – July 30, 2002
- Volumes: 2

Court no Naka no Tenshi-tachi (コートの中の天使達, Kōto no Naka no Tenshi tachi) is a Japanese erotic visual novel developed by Pinpai and published by Pink Pineapple, released on September 22, 1999 for Windows. It was adapted into a four-episode animated series by the company from October 27, 2000, to January 25, 2002; the first two of which were localized in North America as Angels in the Court by NuTech Digital.

== Gameplay ==
Being a visual novel, Court no Naka no Tenshi-tachi has characteristically minimal gameplay; it does however incorporate elements similar to a simulation game.

Each girl is equipped with four stats: fitness, technique, tactics and combination. Periodically between scenes, the player is given the chance to coach a specific girl; the offer can, however, be declined. One-on-one coaching increases a specific character's stats while, usually at the end of certain scenes, the player trains the entire team at once.

Scenes are composed of sequential story and character interactions which flow consecutively until the player is presented with actions or responses to choose from. As choices are intricately linked to alternating routes of plot, the direction of the story is changed, leading to erotic scenes between characters and ultimately one of various endings. In order for the player to watch all the possible endings in this regard, he or she will have to effectively replay through the game several times, all the while making different selections.

== Plot ==
Ou Motoura is a Japanese, former national men's volleyball player and celebrity, single, independent, and employed at the fictional Aota Academy (アオタ 学園, Aota Gakuen) as a coach for the boys' volleyball team. When a member is expelled for fighting, the group dissolves, leaving Motoura to transfer to the girls' team instead. The exchange a sullen, unwanted one, with his reputation as a sportsman on the line, Motoura swallows his pride and takes up their training. It is only afterward, however, that he begins to develop feelings for them.

== Characters ==
Oh Motoura (元浦 央, Motoura Ou)
The main protagonist of the series, Oh Motoura is a twenty-seven-year-old, former volleyball star, semi-retired, and working at Aota Academy as a coach. A fit and handsome bachelor, his life takes an unusual turn when he is reassigned to train the girls' volleyball division, a change he is discontent with. Though his initial impression is an indifferent one, over the course of their training, Motoura is enamored by his new students, such that he becomes romantically involved with them. Of his most interesting features, Motoura is almost never seen without his sunglasses on. In the series, he has spikey silver blue hair and dark grey eyes.
Shou Marui (円井 晶, Marui Shou)
Shou is a student and member of the girls' volleyball team, regarded as the group's leader, best attacker, and who plays left-front. A modest, down-to-earth character, Shou is affectionate, athletic, playful, responsible and spirited. Unlike the rest of the girls, she takes an immediate liking to Motoura, welcoming him as her trainer and being the first to have a crush on him.
Kumi Marui (円井 玖美, Marui Kumi)
Kumi is Shou's capricious sister, also a student and member of the volleyball team who plays front-center as their designated setter. Unlike in the animated series, where she is very much like her sibling, Kumi's incarnation in the game is that of a strict, brash, self-righteous girl with a quick, often loud temper. In spite of her difficult attitude, and much to her denial and vex, Kumi is easily the most sensitive of the group, prone to fits of emotion and grief.
Nao Inabe (伊那 部尚, Inabe Nao)'
Voiced by Shayla LaVeaux (anime)
Stern and cocksure, Nao is a fellow student and team member who plays front-right. The notably more matured of the group, Nao is outwardly assertive, determined, voluptuous, and unafraid of speaking her mind. Considered one of the better players, coupled with a firm commandment, Nao is the second most admired and respected member behind Shou.
Mayumi Kitajima (喜多嶋 麻由美, Kitajima Mayumi)
A somewhat nondescript individual, Mayumi is a student who plays back-center. She is noticeably the only nonwhite member of the team and while cheerful, is for the most part an uninvolved character. Mayumi has a hobby of collecting dolls and is good friends with Mio Matsuda.
Kuzuha Shionogi (潮乃木 葛葉, Shionogi Kuzuha)
Kuzuha is a student who plays back-left to center. The most soft-spoken of the team, Kuzuha habitually keeps to herself and generally says very little, although on the court she is noted as a competent player. Sexually abused as a child, at the hands of an undisclosed man, Kuzuha is an obstinate though heterosexual misandrist; a paradox that comes to haunt her when she finds herself attracted to Motoura!
Mio Matsuda (松田 未依, Matsuda Mio)
Mio is a student who plays back-right to center. A meek girl by nature, Mio is easily intimidated and scared, traits that make her the periodic target of bullies. Despite this, she is surprisingly friendly and rigid, especially in the company of Mayumi, with whom she shares an interest for dolls, anime, and manga. Though she can often seem like a pushover, Mio is a good listener and can show courage when the need arises.
Kozue Nekoda (音胡田 こずえ, Nekoda Kozue)
With hair in pigtails and unzipped jersey knotted beneath her chest, Kozue is overtly the most lascivious member of the group. A student who acts as a substitute player, frustrated no doubt, she takes an immediate interest in Motoura, pouring her sex appeal on him every opportunity she can. Regardless of her sloven behavior, Kozue is an outgoing, attentive volleyball player.
Fumie Shiratori (白鳥ふみえ, Shiratori Fumie)
Hitomi Kido (木戸ひとみ, Kido Hitomi)
Fumie and Hitomi are a couple of girlfriends who drop by to join the team later in the game, becoming separately trainable characters after they are acquired. They are practically never seen apart, and with the exception of Shou, who the pair bond with the most, owed to their unsupported pride, timidity, and whininess, become the most disliked members of the league.
Nanase Morimura (森村 奈々瀬, Morimura Nanase)
Voiced by Brooke Haven (anime)
Nanase Morimura is a second-year middle school transfer student who is the only character exclusive to the animated series. She visits the group early into her arrival looking to join the team, winning a match single-handedly against four of the girls and thus, becoming accepted. It is only discovered later however, that her prolific skill only becomes available to her when she is sexually aroused, a trait she becomes dependent on Oh for.
Haruo Kabanishi (カバニシ ハルオ, Kabanishi Haruo)
Haruo Kabanishi is Motoura's "arch enemy" and a rival volleyball coach employed at O-Ring Academy-(Ōringu Gakuen (Oリング 学園)).
Aiko Yada (ヤダ アイコ, Yada Aiko)
Aiko Yada is a wing spiker for O-Ring Academy's volleyball team. She is rumored to be a shoo-in for the All Japan Team, it is hinted that she has romantic feelings for Haruo as seen when the latter was fondling with her breasts.

== Media ==
=== Anime ===
Court no Naka no Tenshi-tachi was adapted into a four-episode, direct-to-video animated series by Pink Pineapple, parent of Pinpai, from October 27, 2000, to January 25, 2002. NuTech Digital acquired the licenses for the first pair of episodes around May 2001, publishing them under the name Angels in the Court as separate VHS and DVD releases until when they were bundled into a DVD box set from November 2001 onward. Notably, the English dubs featured the voices of Brooke Haven and Shayla LaVeaux. Additionally, Banzaï, a French redistributor, published an iteration of the series under the name Vestiaire Olympique. The concluding two episodes, titled Kaette Kita Court no Naka no Tenshi-tachi (帰ってきたコートの中の天使達, Kaette Kita Court no Naka no Tenshi tachi) ("Return of Angels in the Court") were released to DVD on October 26, 2001 and January 25, 2002, but were never localized outside Japan.

The original two episodes of Court no Naka no Tenshi-tachi did not contain an opening animation and thus, no opening theme. The ending credits were however, accompanied by the song Koi no Super Ace (恋のスーパーエース, Koi no Supa Esu) ("Love's Super Ace"), performed by Mari Adachi and Mie Sonozaki. The second pair of episodes were opened with Kimihe no Victory (キミへのVictory) ("Victory To You"), performed by Kahoru Sasajima and Kimiko Koyama, and closed with the song Watashi ha Ball (私はボール, Watashi ha Boru) ("I Am A Ball"), performed by Mari Adachi and Anda Zakimie.

The anime received generally positive reviews. Industry aggregator Mania.com gave the box set a B, calling the visuals "solidly done" with "good animation, pretty girls, and [has] some seriously funny scenes."

=== Novels ===
Besides its adaption into an animated series, Court no Naka no Tenshi-tachi was published into a two volume novel series by now-defunct KSS Books, written by Muto Yasuyuki and based on his screenplay for the anime. Retitled Court no Naka no Tenshi-tachi: Ano Hitomi Niaitakute (コートの中の天使達 あの瞳に逢いたくて, Koto no Naka no Tenshi-tachi: Ano Hitomi Niaitakute), the books were published on August 30, 2001, and July 20, 2002, respectively.
