= Brigandine: The Legend of Runersia =

2020 video game

- Developer: Matrix Software
- Publisher: Happinet
- Director: Satoshi Ohwada
- Producer: Kazuhiro Igarashi
- Designer: Tasuki Ito
- Programmer: Noboru Ikeda
- Artists: Raita Kazama; Jin Tamura; Yuta Koyano
- Writer: Kenji Terada
- Composer: Tenpei Sato
- Engine: Unity
- Platforms: Nintendo Switch; PlayStation 4; Windows
- Release: June 25, 2020: Nintendo Switch; June 25, 2020; PlayStation 4; December 10, 2020; Windows; May 11, 2022
- Genres: Turn-based strategy, tactical role-playing
- Mode: Single-player

Brigandine: The Legend of Runersia is a turn-based strategy game developed by Matrix Software and published by Happinet. It is a sequel to the 1998 PlayStation game Brigandine: The Legend of Forsena, and features the same core gameplay with a new setting. The player chooses one of six nations of the continent of Runersia and must guide it to conquer the others and unify the land using powerful Rune Knights and their summoned monsters. The game was released worldwide for Nintendo Switch and PlayStation 4 in 2020, and for Windows in May 2022.

A sequel titled Brigandine: Abyss, developed by Happinet, will be releasing on PlayStation 5, Nintendo Switch 2, Xbox Series X, Xbox Series S, and Steam in 2026, with NIS America publishing the game in the west.

== Gameplay ==
As in the previous game, gameplay in Brigandine: The Legend of Runersia is a mix of tactical, turn-based battles and grand strategy. The player assumes control of one of six nations, each with its strengths and weaknesses. They must use troops to attack and occupy enemy castles while defending their own. Each troop consists of several monsters under the command of a human leader called a Rune Knight. There are over 100 unique Rune Knights, and each nation has a single Rune Knight designated as the "ruler". Both monsters and Rune Knights have hit points and mana pools and can become stronger by leveling up by gaining experience with the use of various skills and spells.

Rune Knights and their monsters confront enemy troops in turn-based battles, with the outcome deciding who controls a given castle. To win a battle and occupy/defend a castle, the player must either defeat all enemy Rune Knights and force them to retreat or overwhelm the enemy to the extent that they voluntarily withdraw to avoid further damage. A defeated Rune Knight becomes wounded and must spend time recovering, while defeated monsters are dead but can be revived with a specific item. If one side's Ruler is defeated in battle, all of the accompanying Rune Knights are forced to withdraw regardless of their condition. If no troops are posted at a castle to defend it, an invading troop can occupy that castle without a battle.

The game has two main phases on the strategy end: Organization and Attack. In the Organization Phase, the player decides where to move their troops, how to compose them, whether to send idle Rune Knights on automated quests for rare items, and which castles to attack. The turn-based battles make up the Attack Phase. All six nations perform an Organization Phase and an Attack Phase in sequence. These combined actions are called a "season" and mark the passage of time. A single year in the game is made of 24 seasons, with higher difficulty settings placing a limit on how many seasons may pass before the game will automatically end; an easy game has no limit, a normal game is capped at 120 seasons or five years, and a hard game is capped at 60 seasons or two and a half years. To conquer Runersia, the player must occupy all of the continent's castles at once.

The game is divided into two modes. The Main Mode features a story-based experience for each of the six nations. The Challenge Mode or "Alternate Chapter" is comparable to a sandbox in which the player can assemble a semi-custom army by first choosing a nation and its ruler and then selecting nine Rune Knights from among those that the player has previously recruited in Main Mode, regardless of their affiliation. Challenge Mode campaigns also receive a Strategy Score based on the player's speed and performance, encouraging the player to strive for higher and higher scores, and achieving victory requires fulfilling each of 10 different victory conditions throughout a campaign.

== Plot ==
The game features a multi-faceted war between six nations, five of which bear powerful armor relics called Brigandines, for complete control of the continent of Runersia. The conflict was instigated in the year 781 by a series of consequential events: the Norzaleo Kingdom's monarch dying under unexplained circumstances, civil unrest in the Holy Gustava Empire precipitating an invasion of Norzaleo, the disappearance of the Republic of Guimoule's president, a revolution within the Mana Saleesia Theocracy, the emergence of the Shinobi Tribe, and the United Islands of Mirelva seizing the opportunity provided by the chaos to plunder the mainland.

The six nations of Runersia are:

- Norzaleo Kingdom: An island monarchy established by the hero Adessa that follows the Mohana sect of the Rune faith and frequently clashes with Gustava. It wields the Brigandine of Justice. Its troops are led by Prince Rubino IV, the uncrowned son of the late King Rubino III.
- Republic of Guimoule: A nation founded by Mohana Carridine, the progenitor of the Mohana sect of the Rune faith, and the rival of Mana Saleesia. It wields the Brigandine of Glory. Its troops are led by Eliza Uzala, daughter and recognized successor of Guimoule's incapacitated 15th president, Alden Uzala.
- Shinobi Tribe: An isolationist, matriarchal tribe born from the former mercenary nation of Hazam, which was destroyed by Norzaleo and Guimoule. It wields the Brigandine of Freedom. Its troops are led by Talia, daughter of the tribe's chief, Della.
- Mana Saleesia Theocracy: A powerful nation in the mana-rich heartlands of Runersia founded by the progenitor of the Zai sect of the Rune faith, and the rival of Guimoule. It wields the Brigandine of Sanctity. Its troops are led by Rudo Marco, who usurped his more moderate father, Holy Sovereign Romanov, to spread the Zai sect across the land.
- United Islands of Mirelva: A loose alliance of seven pirate clans who banded together for mutual protection in the wake of Hazam's collapse. It wields the Brigandine of Ego. Its troops are led by the ambitious Captain Stella Hamett, daughter of Mirelva's chairman, Ginium Hamett.
- Holy Gustava Empire: A scorned nation founded by exiles from Norzaleo that follows the Zoar faith, which worships the hero Zoar and considers the Rune God to be fallible. It lacks a Brigandine of its own. Its troops are led by Tim Gustav, the 13th emperor, who seeks to capture the Brigandines and prove the innate superiority of his clan to the world.

== Development ==
Brigandine: The Legend of Runersia was a joint project between developer Matrix Software and publisher Happinet for Nintendo Switch. The game took two and a half years to develop. Producer Kazuhiro Igarashi joined Happinet subsidiary E3 Staff in 1998, the same year it released Brigandine: The Legend of Forsena on PlayStation. E3 Staff was dissolved before Igarashi was able to work on a Brigandine title like he had hoped, but he was given an opportunity to help revive the series when Happinet reopened its game development department in 2013. The publisher initially considered a remake but as the core staff members of the first Brigandine were not available, a team was assembled to create a new entry in the franchise. According to Igarashi, many companies were considered as partners for the game's development but the employees of Matrix Software were the only ones to bring a strategy guide for the first Brigandine game to their initial meeting. They were hired after the producer learned that many of them were fans of the series and had a deep understanding of the gameplay. Igarashi explained that the creators wished to add to the originality of the gameplay of the earlier Brigandine games while not being directly influenced by any other intellectual properties. The team focused on its tactical elements, which they saw lacking within pay-to-win strategy games that were popular in Japan at the time. Igarashi revealed that the developers worked closely with Nintendo Japan to ensure that the game's large number of 3D models possible on a battlefield map would run smoothly on the Switch hardware. A multiplayer option was considered during the planning stage of development, but with campaigns taking tens of hours to complete, the developers concluded that many players would lack the necessary environment to play online or would find it too challenging to play this way.

Kenji Terada was brought on as the game's scenario writer after Igarashi met him in Ikebukuro thanks to a mutual contact. Terada's notably wrote the scenarios for the first three games in Final Fantasy series. Having been a long-time fan of his previous work, Igarashi asked Terada directly to draft the new project's fantasy world. Terada chose to craft an "old-fashioned, traditional fantasy story" in place of "something heavy". The plot was designed to only be seen in its entirety by the player completing nation's campaign and then piecing them together. A large, diverse cast of characters was devised and each of the game's nations was given its own history and ideology so that the player could decide its heroes and villains. With a specific vision of the game's visual style in mind, Igarashi's first choice for the game's art and character design was Raita Kazama, an artist for both the Disgaea and Xenoblade series. Kazama was given more freedom with The Legend of Runersia than with his previous jobs. He chose to give members of each nation distinct features from one another based on varying cultures, industries, ideologies, and religions. In all, Kazama and his team created over 100 unique designs for the game's named knights. After an email exchange, Igarashi met composer Tenpei Sato in Shibuya to discuss composition of the game's musical score. Sato, who previously did soundtracks for Brigandine: Grand Edition and the Disgaea series, was promptly put in charge of the music for The Legend of Runersia. He composed the music after much of the plot and illustrations were already completed and tailored songs specifically to each nation starting with the Norzaleo Kingdom. Sato composed a total of 38 songs for the game. Recording sessions for the game's voice acting took about one and a half months with Terada working closely with the actors, adjusting the dialogue scripts as necessary.

== Release ==
Brigandine: The Legend of Runersia was revealed by publisher Happinet for Nintendo Switch in September 2019, accompanied by the game's first teaser trailer and gameplay screenshots. The game was released worldwide on June 25, 2020. Most of the game's development was completed prior to the declaration of the COVID-19 pandemic in early 2020. The developers were able to spend much of early part of that year making adjustments and fixing bugs despite an increasing number of employees having to stay home from work and close collaboration between the developers becoming a challenge due to the pandemic. Planned releases for both a free demo and the game's full version stayed on schedule. The demo was released on the Nintendo eShop and contained a tutorial and an opening segment of the Norzaleo Kingdom campaign.

The retail release of the game features both digital and physical editions. The digital edition consists of the standard version of the game, and is published by Happinet in all regions. A physical standard edition and a limited edition were produced for Japan by Happinet, while Limited Run Games produced a physical standard edition and collector's edition for North America. The limited edition includes a copy of the game, a soundtrack CD, the "Art of Runersia" art book, and the "Tactics of Runersia" strategy book. The collector's edition includes a copy of the game, a soundtrack CD, a reversible poster, and an enamel pin depicting the emblem of the Holy Gustava Empire. A PlayStation 4 version of the game was released worldwide on December 10 the same year. A Windows port of the game was released via Steam on May 11, 2022. It includes post-game content via "Creative Mode", in which players can pick their preferred power balance and starting knights and play at leisure without a time limit.

== Reception ==
Reception

Aggregate score
Aggregator	Score
Metacritic	NS: 76/100; PS4: 71/100; PC: 72/100

Review scores
Publication	Score
4Players	NS: 82/100; PS4: 39/100
Famitsu	33/40
Game Informer	7.5/10
Nintendo Life	7/10
Nintendo World Report	8/10
RPGamer	3.5/5
RPGFan	NS: 85/100; PS4: 68/100
RPG Site	8/10

Brigandine: The Legend of Runersia received "mixed or average" reviews for PlayStation 4 and PC according to review aggregator Metacritic; the Nintendo Switch version received "generally favorable" reviews.

RPG Site's Chao Min Wu praised the game's character art, soundtrack, and gameplay, comparing it to the board game Risk in terms of its focus on territory acquisition and defense. He also noted that despite the seemingly overwhelming number of gameplay elements, the core experience was relatively simple. Criticism was directed at the length of battles, which were described as "exhausting" when multiple battles were triggered in a single turn, the ease with which the AI could be exploited given that it preferentially attacked nations with smaller armies, and the low graphical quality of the game's 3D models.

Game Informer's Kimberley Wallace identified the depth of customization available for the player's troops in the form of a wide variety of upgradeable units with multiple classes and unique abilities as a highlight of the game. She panned its battles as slow and repetitive, however, and claimed that although the game was a "decent and functional" strategy RPG well-positioned for the greater attention brought to the genre by the recent success of Fire Emblem: Three Houses, it did nothing unexpected or especially memorable.

=== Sales ===
According to Famitsu, the game debuted at #6 in Japan with 15,242 units sold in the first week. The game also debuted at #4 in Taiwan according to Media Create.
