= Alien from the Darkness =

1996 Japanese animated science fiction horror film

- Logo of the OVA
- 淫獣エイリアン
- Also known as: Lust Alien
- Type: OVA
- Genre: Science fiction; Horror; Hentai
- Directed by: Norio Takanami
- Screenplay by: Shino Taira
- Character designer: Oborodzukiyo
- Music by: CUE
- Country of origin: Japan
- Original language: Japanese
- No. of episodes: 1

Production
- Art director: Tsutomu Nishikura
- Sound director: Hajime Takakuwa
- Cinematographer: Yousuke Moriguchi
- Color designer: Haremi Miyakawa
- Editor: Koganei Editing Room
- Studio: PP Project
- Producer: Saburō Ōmiya
- Production company: Pink Pineapple
- Runtime: 45 minutes

Original release
- Release: 1996

Alien from the Darkness (Japanese: 淫獣エイリアン, Hepburn: Injū Eirian), also known as Lust Alien, is a 1996 Japanese science fiction horror hentai original video animation (OVA) directed by Norio Takanami, written by Shino Taira and released by Pink Pineapple. The film follows the all-female crew of a spacecraft who inadvertently bring a hostile extraterrestrial aboard their vessel, an motif influenced by the Alien franchise.

== Plot ==
Returning from a mining expedition to the planet Kerun, the all-female crew of the federal government's scientific exploration vessel Muze receives a distress signal from a civilian cargo ship, the Zogne. After docking with the drifting spacecraft, the crew discovers numerous bodies bearing signs of mysterious deaths. They also find capsules containing Metrogria, a prohibited and highly toxic substance. The only apparent survivor is a beautiful woman named Flair Mytomeyer, discovered in a suspended animation chamber. Claiming to suffer from amnesia, Flair is brought aboard the Muze for medical treatment.

Hikari, the ship's computer specialist, begins analyzing the encrypted records retrieved from the Zogne with the assistance of the ship's computer, Elle (eL). Captain Sarah orders the cargo ship destroyed after the discovery of its illegal cargo. During preparations for its destruction, a crew member, Annie, dies under circumstances resembling those of the Zogne crew.

Eventually, Flair is revealed to be a shape-shifting extraterrestrial organism disguised as a human woman. The alien begins attacking the crew, whose subsequent deaths and increasingly erratic behavior mirror what happened aboard the Zogne. Among its victims are Keith, Captain Sarah and the ship's physician Hilda, who is Sarah's lover. Before dying, Sarah urges Hikari and her older sister Yuri to abandon the ship.

Meanwhile, Hikari's pet ferret, Einstein, inadvertently helps her discover a concealed supply of Metrogria. Another crew member, Lind, reveals that she had intended to use the government vessel to smuggle the substance and sell it on the black market. She attempts to seize control of the ship but is attacked by the alien.

With the assistance of Elle, Hikari discovers the alien's true nature. Conventional weapons prove ineffective against it, but Hikari realizes that Metrogria is lethal to the creature. When the alien corners the sisters, Yuri sacrifices herself to allow Hikari to escape. Armed with a single Metrogria projectile, Hikari confronts and wounds the creature before ejecting it into space through an emergency hatch. Yuri is apparently lost with it.

In a post-credits scene, Yuri unexpectedly returns to the control room and embraces Hikari. Her sinister expression and Einstein's hostile reaction suggest that the alien may have survived by assuming Yuri's appearance.

== Production and release ==
Alien from the Darkness was directed by Norio Takanami, with music by CUE. Writing in the third edition of The Anime Encyclopedia (2015), Jonathan Clements and Helen McCarthy identified the Alien films as a major influence on the OVA and compared it to another pornographic science fiction anime released in 1996, Advancer Tina.

The OVA was released on VHS in Japan in 1996. A Japanese DVD edition followed on October 26, 2001. In North America, it was distributed on VHS and DVD by Kitty Media, with the DVD released on May 27, 2003, featuring Japanese and English audio tracks and English subtitles.

== Reception ==
While Clements and McCarthy in their The Anime Encyclopedia; offered no editorial opinion about the OVA in its entry, writing about a similar 1987 OVA Battle Can Can cited Alien from the Darkness they described it and Advancer Tina as examples of the disappointing subsequent development of pornographic science fiction anime, claiming that the works show that "there truly was no hope for the genre".

Hannah Stanton of THEM Anime Reviews awarded the OVA one out of five stars, considering it a very weak production, although "a step above Cool Devices or La Blue Girl". Although she praised the character designs and acknowledged the presence of a semi-coherent narrative, she criticized the predictable plot, dialogue, stereotypical characterization and the introduction of too many characters for the film's short running time. She suggested that a multi-episode production might have allowed for better character development.

Chris Beveridge of The Fandom Post gave the OVA a C grade. He considered its combination of action, horror and adult content effective but formulaic, and criticized its lack of originality and its failure to develop the large cast sufficiently to engage the viewer. He was more positive about the technical presentation of the North American DVD release.

In a more positive retrospective review published in 2023, Jim Cox of Grimoire of Horror argued that the smuggling and mutiny subplots helped distinguish the OVA from Ridley Scott's Alien (1979). He praised its characterization, animation, visual detail and cinematography, suggesting that the production had considerable merit as a science fiction horror film independent of its adult content.

== See also ==
- Alien
- Advancer Tina
