= Dark Shell =

2003 original video animation

- Dark Shell: Lust in the Cage
- Cover of the first Dark Shell episode

ダーク・シェル ～檻の中の艶～ (Dāku Sheru Ori no Naka no Namameki)
- Genre: Erotic, psychological thriller
- Original video animation
- Directed by: Katsuma Kanazawa
- Studio: ARMS
- Licensed by: NuTech Digital (former); Adult Source Media (current)
- Released: 2003
- Runtime: 30 minutes
- Episodes: 2

Dark Shell: Lust in the Cage (ダーク・シェル ～檻の中の艶～, Dāku Sheru Ori no Naka no Namameki) is a 2003 Japanese erotic original video animation directed by Katsuma Kanazawa. The storyline follows the grisly fates of a group of civilian women in a fictional, war-torn Tokyo, as they are repeatedly raped by the soldiers that are supposed to protect them. The box set was released on July 2, 2004, by NuTech Digital. Another release was done by Adult Source Media October 11, 2006.

== Production and release ==
The original studio which headed the project was Echo Animation Studio having been produced by Blue Eyes, Doo Lee Production and ARMS. Katsuma Kanazawa directed the OVA. The Japanese released included DVD and VHS releases, the first volume was released on June 25, 2003, and the second volume was released on September 25, 2003.

The American release has been done under two companies. First by NuTech Digital which would release the box set on July 2, 2004. In 2006, as a result of the lawsuit against Nutech Digital by Ken Groove Media alleging breach of contract Adult Source Media acquired the rights to Dark Shell as a result. The case concerned breach of contract and Ken Grove Media and concerned 34 titles, which were sold online and under a contract price. A second release was done by Adult Source Media in 2006.

== Reception ==
Beveridge of Mania offered a mixed review of the work. The content and bleak setting with sex and extreme violence would appeal to few viewers. The graphics and character development were only average, but was filled with negativity from the characters. The localization conducted by NuTech was criticized for the timing of the subtitles to the English dub which resulted in scenes of dialogue being separated from the speaker and the misspellings of the subtitles. This opinion was backed up by Saito who would not recommend the OVA because of its excessive violence, noting that the women are raped and killed after and during sex.
