= G-Taste =

Japanese manga series

- First volume cover
- Genre: Erotic
- Manga
- Written by: Hiroki Yagami
- Published by: Kodansha
- Magazine: Mr. Magazine (1996–2000); Young Magazine Uppers (2000–2004)
- Original run: 1996 – 2004
- Volumes: 7
- Original video animation
- Directed by: Katsuma Kanazawa
- Music by: Shin'ichi Yuuki
- Studio: Green Bunny & AIC
- Licensed by: NA: SoftCel Pictures, Critical Mass
- Released: December 18, 1999 – April 24, 2003
- Runtime: 30 minutes (each)
- Episodes: 7
- Original video animation

G-Best
- Directed by: Katsuhiko Nishijima
- Music by: Shin'ichi Yuuki
- Studio: AIC PLUS+
- Released: November 22, 2010
- Runtime: 25 minutes

G-Taste is a Japanese erotic manga series written and illustrated by Hiroki Yagami and serialized in Kodansha's Mr. Magazine from 1996 to 2000, before being moved to Young Magazine Uppers from 2000 to 2004. The "G" in "G-taste" is used symbolically as the letter between "F" (for "Fetish") and "H" (for "hentai"). The anime was originally licensed in the US by SoftCel Pictures; the rights have since expired and now Critical Mass has since bought the rights. Not all of the series has been licensed as only the first five episodes have been released in the US. Episodes 6 and 7 have, to date, not been released in the US at all. An additional single episode OVA was released in 2010 bundled with the G-Best - G-Taste Best Selection compilation manga from Kodansha.

The G-taste comics consist of a collection of four scene erotic vignettes, which typically each focus on a particular female character. Characteristically, they feature very little male involvement in sexual acts, which contributes to the voyeuristic atmosphere. They are not usually very graphic, abiding by the Japanese legal restriction on not showing genitals. Some of the activities shown include masturbation, bondage, lesbian sex etc.

== Characters ==
The characters of G-taste include the stock figures of Japanese pornography, including the school girl, office clerk, secretary, nurse, waitress, receptionist, campaign girl, maid, doctor, teacher, wife and mother.

=== G-taste #1 ===
- Takaoka Yōko (高岡 陽子): An office lady.
- Kisaragi Riona (如月 里緒菜): An office clerk who feels aroused when wearing red clothes.
- Shihōdō Yuki (四方堂 由姫): A housewife who often prefers to wear Chinese cheongsam.
- Nagai Reiko (永井 麗子): An office lady.
- Mizukoshi Sayaka (水越 沙耶香): A high school teacher who engages in forbidden relationships.
- Morimura Nana (森村 奈々): A maid employed by Baron Masquerade.
- Endō Miki (遠藤 美季): A high school student who wants to get an all-over tan.
- Takigawa Aya (多岐川 綾): An office lady.
- Akiyama Asami (秋山 麻美): An office lady.
- Okazato Shōko (岡里 翔子): A lady who loves to dress in high heels and tight clothing.
- Tsuchiya Emiri (土屋 絵美理): A fleeter who loves to dress in leathers and dominatrix clothing.

=== G-taste #2 ===
- Yagisawa Moe (八木沢 萌): An office lady.
- Leotard High Heels (レオタード・ハイヒール): A space police officer who often finds herself bound up in shibari; her real name is unknown.
- Kawamura Misuzu (川村 美鈴): A high school student who loves to expose herself to her brother, also became Mizukoshi Sayaka's lover.
- Jōgasaki Yui (城ヶ崎 唯): A waitress.
- Fujisawa Ryōko (藤沢 涼子): A woman who likes to dress in traditional clothing.
- Nishina Aoi (仁科 葵): A bus guide.
- Senō Asuka (瀬能 明日香): A nurse.
- Fubuki Kyōka (風吹 京花): A doctor who works at the same hospital Asuka works at, who often does "personal examinations" with the nurse.
- Saotome Keiko (早乙女 慶子): A teacher.
- Mochizuki Kana (望月 香奈): A student who is seduced by Keiko after she is caught masturbating.
- Baron Masquerade (マスカレード男爵): A wealthy person who spies on women through many means; later, it is revealed that the Baron is a woman. Her real name is unknown.
- Kannazuki Mai (神無月 舞): Chief secretary to Baron Masquerade and head of household.
- Lady O (O嬢 [黄色人子]): A masked announcer. Her real name is unknown.

Reappearing in issue #2 are Takaoka Yōko, Mizukoshi Sayaka and Shihōdō Yuki.

=== G-taste #3 ===
- Miura Ayumi (三浦 あゆみ): A woman who likes to display high-heel shoes.
- Hoshino Mayu (星野 麻由): An idol, also appears as a maid working for Baron Masquerade.
- Konno Ayaka (紺野 彩香): An idol, also appears as a maid working for Baron Masquerade.
- Egawa Yuka (江川 由佳): Someone who enjoys giving fellatio.
- Nomura Mizuki (野村 瑞季): A woman who wraps her body up in gift tape to make her a "present".
- Kisaragi Marina (如月 麻里菜): A Shintō shrine maiden, Kisaragi Riona's elder sister.
- Nogami Tōko (野上 東子): An event companion.
- Tokiwa Izumi (常盤 いずみ): A baton twirler and idol star.
- Kamizono Fumika (神薗 史華): A receptionist.
- Saiki Mayu (斉木 まゆ): A waitress.
- Aizawa Kanae (相沢 香苗): A nurse and co-worker of Senō Asuka.
- Elena A. Sladkaya (Елена А. Сладкая) (エレーナ・スラードカヤ): A model, most likely Russian.
- Kisaki Yui (樹崎 結): A hostess.
- Yuminaga Shizuka (弓長 静花): A hostess.
- Natsugawa Aya (夏川 綾): A hostess and Shizuka's lover.
- Ōsawa Natsumi (大澤 夏実): A woman who gets tangled up with a riding crop.

Also appearing in this episode are Kannazuki Mai, Shihōdō Yuki and Kisaragi Riona.

=== G-taste #4 ===
- Mizutani Risa (水谷 理沙): A maid who works for Baron Masquerade, frequently serves as Morimura Nana's lover.

Also appearing in this volume are Baron Masquerade, Kannazuki Mai, Morimura Nana, Hoshino Mayu and Konno Ayaka.

=== G-taste #4 1/2 ===
Most of this special volume of G-taste includes single picture scenes of characters, plus character designs. Some of these are colourized repeats of what had appeared in previous volumes.

- Noda Yūko (野田 優子): One picture, shown in a shower scene, occupation unknown.
- Ogawa Miki (小川 美希): One picture, shown in a shower scene, occupation unknown.
- Fujiwara Mariko (藤原 茉莉子): One picture, shown as an event hostess in scene with Nagasaki Kumiko.
- Nagasaki Kumiko (長崎 公美子): One picture, shown as an event hostess in scene with Fujiwara Mariko.
- Andō Miyuki (安藤 美幸): Two pictures (one single, one with Makimura Saki), an office lady.
- Amano Kotomi (天野 琴美): One picture, an office lady.
- Ronmei (龍梅 [ロンメイ]): Multiple pictures, a fashion model, real name unknown.
- Hachiōji Kyōko (八王寺 京子): One picture, an office lady.
- Hanasaki Yumeo (花咲 夢緒): One picture with design sheets in colour and black and white, a baton twirler.
- Saeki Nagisa (佐伯 渚): One picture, a police officer.
- Sawatari Mika (沢渡 美華): One picture, a bunny girl.
- Makimura Saki (牧村 咲): One picture with Andō Miyuki, an office lady.
- Lisa Goldfinger (リサ・ゴールドフィンガー): One picture, occupation unknown, most likely American.
- Kizaki Yui (木崎 維): One picture, a waitress at a bar.
- Midorikawa Mayo (緑川 真世): One picture, shown undressing, occupation unknown.
- Jane Fox (ジェーン・フォックス): One picture, occupation unknown, most likely American.
- Kamizono Fumika (神園 史華): Character design in both colour and black and white, a high school student.
- Matsunaga Yōko (松永 葉子): Character design in both colour and black and white, a high school student.
- Sanada Tamaki (真田 珠樹): Character design in both colour and black and white, a high school student who also works at a market.
- Kiriyama Hitomi (霧山 瞳): Character design in both colour and black and white, an office lady.
- Takashiro Mizuho (高城 瑞穂): Character design in both colour and black and white, an office manager.
- Izumi Masumi (和泉 真純): Character design in both colour and black and white, a high school student.

Also appearing in this publication are Kisaragi Marina, Mizutani Risa, Ōsawa Natsumi, Yuminaga Shizuka, Natsugawa Aya, Mizukoshi Sayaka (in a multi-page story), Yagisawa Moe (in a multi-page story, plus singles portraits), Lady O, Tsuchiya Emiri (in a coloured repeat of her first appearance in volume #1), Shihōdō Yuki, Hoshino Mayu and Konno Ayaka (two paired portraits and a short story), Morimura Nana, Mizutani Risa, Kannazuki Mai, Baron Masquerade (as a woman), Saiki Mayu (design sheets in colour and black and white), Aizawa Kanae (design sheets in colour and black and white) and Elena A. Sladkaya (design sheets in colour and black and white).

=== G-taste #5 ===
- Hasumi Ren (蓮見 蓮): A nurse and co-worker of Senō Asuka.
- Fubuki Tōka (風吹 東花): A doctor at the hospital where Ren and Asuka work, she is also Kyōka's twin sister.
- Hanasaki Tomoyo (花咲 知世): A high school student who is also a baton twirler, Yumeo's younger sister.

Also appearing in this volume are Hanasaki Yumeo, Kisaragi Riona, Hoshino Mayu, Konno Ayaka, Senō Asuka, Fubuki Kyōka, Endō Miki, Kannazuki Mai, Shihōdō Yuki, Jōgasaki Yui, Mizukoshi Sayaka, Kawamura Misuzu and Leotard High Heels.

=== G-taste #6 ===
- Kawamura Sayuri (川村 さゆり): A police officer, also appeared in the manga Futari ni Omakase.
- Ikegami Asami (池上 麻美): A police officer, also appeared in the manga Futari ni Omakase.
- Kusakabe Jun (草壁 純): A police officer, also appeared in the manga Futari ni Omakase.
- Shingyōji Yuna (真行寺 由奈): A News Planet rookie announcer.
- Morino Kiyomi (森野 聖美): A woman made to be one of Santa Claus' elves.
- Mōri Mio (毛利 未織): A woman trialling a nail clipper.

Also appearing in this volume are Hanazaki Tomoyo, Tokiwa Izumi, Kawamura Misuzu, Mizukoshi Sayaka, Fubuki Tōka, Kisaragi Marina, Kisaragi Riona, Hachiōji Kyōko, Hoshino Mayu, Konno Ayaka, Shihōdō Yuki, Kannazuki Mai, Nishina Aoi, Senō Asuka, Aizawa Kanae, Hasumi Ren and Fubuki Kyōka.

=== G-taste #7 ===
- Hiiragi Mirei (柊 美礼): A traditional Japanese woman often depicted in a kimono.

Also appearing in this volume are the majority of the characters who appeared in previous volumes of the series.

== Adaptations ==
G-taste has also released a number of short films, mostly dramatizations of its comic stories. They are distinguished by realistic entourage. It has also spawned a number of computer games, namely Munasawagi no Yokan: Yagami Hiroki no Game-Taste for the original PlayStation and Mahjong G-taste for arcades and PlayStation 2.
