= Wish me mell =

Mell
- Sanrio character
- Official illustration of Mell, done by Miyuki Okumura
- First appearance: 2010
- Last appearance: present
- Created by: Miyuki Okamura
- Voiced by: Nao Tōyama

In-universe information
- Nickname: Wish me mell
- Species: Rabbit
- Gender: Female
- Occupation: Mail carrier
- Nationality: French

Wish me mell (ウィッシュミーメル, Uisshu mī meru) is a character series created by Sanrio on December 27, 2010, with character designs done by Miyuki Okumura, who designed Cinnamoroll. The main heroine of the series is a rabbit named Mell, who is meant to be a character that expresses the feelings everyone has, simply stating "Thank you", "I am sorry" or "I like you!", connecting hearts in the process.

The series image song is "Stay the Same," performed by Japanese singer Mai Kuraki. The song itself is used in some Sanrio Puroland events.

== Development ==
The series debuted on December 27, 2010, and is officially targeted toward girls ages 15–20, mainly high school and college students, who were too shy to express their feelings toward others. On its official debut, the main character design was not revealed and that the character "Just won't come out" of her egg-shaped house. Sanrio stated that her official release describes her as being "withdrawn" and implores her fans to send her as many messages and Tweets as possible to encourage her to show her face, leading to criticisms of her being a hikikomori. On January 25, 2011, the official character design of Mell was revealed for the first time. An official Ameba blog, Facebook, Twitter and Vine account were made for the fans to interact with the characters of the series. The official blog is updated with site and story updates for the series.

A special promotion of Wish me mell were done in collaboration with the Ritsumeikan University in Kyoto during June 2011 for its Journey of Cheer event, making it the first Sanrio series to have a joint collaboration between the company and the academia.

In July 2011, the official blog stated that the series had ended its first chapter. It began the second chapter a day later. The second chapter introduces to two new characters: an alpaca named Roseanne and a puppy named Maimai. Maimai is based on the Japanese pop singer Mai Kuraki, who collaborated with Sanrio on releasing the series's image song "Stay the Same". The official PV and the song is included in Mai's 10th album Over the Rainbow, released January 11, 2012.

In a new blog entry, Sanrio announced that the company will collaborate with the Japanese fashion company Angelic Pretty to release special accessories based on Wish me mell. On October 2, Sanrio will introduce another collaboration to the series, with two several teaser blogs showing a new character's arrival in Merci Hills. In October 6, the character is revealed to be Buzzy, the official mascot of Karel Capek, a tea shop in Japan. Sanrio announced the collaboration with Karel Capek to make merchandise and tea-related goods based on the Wish me mell series, with illustrations from Utako Yamada.

On October 12, 2012, Sanrio released several stamps of the Wish me mell characters for the instant messaging software LINE.

== Story ==
Mell lives in the magical world of Merci Hills (メルシーヒルズ, Merushī hiruzu), located beyond the rainbow where everyone is living happily while their feelings are connected toward each other and words like "Thank you" can bring warmth to everyone's hearts. Mell and her friends were guided by the rainbow fairy, Ciel, who gives them advice. All the denizens of Merci Hills are students who came from other countries. Mell and her friends are also students living in Merci Hills, but they have their own mission given to them by Ciel.

The story depends on the blog entries on the official blog, excluding site updates and promotions.

=== Chapter 1: Seven-Colored Mission ===
The series's first chapter focuses on Mell, a rabbit from France who is withdrawn from everyone, believing she doesn't have any friends. Ciel, looking at this situation, asked everyone to send as many letters to everyone to make her come out. At the same time, Mell's friends came to study at the Hills and Ciel asked them to take care of the special eggs and told them if they polish them every day, the eggs will change color. And when all seven eggs were gathered, something good will happen. Each of the students accepted the mission and they all received the eggs from Ciel. Then, they went to Mell's house and decided to cheer her up and wanted to help her, though it never worked as her house stayed shut. One day, Poco found a strange egg on the Merci lake and brings it into Mell's house. He told Mell to take good care of it and it will be a secret between the two. As the days go by, Lutz, the postman of Merci Hills visited Mell's house and delivered a special letter to her and also said that it's his last day in Merci Hills as his studies are over and is leaving the place so he can go back to his country, Kenya. As Mell reads the letter, she felt for the first time, the warmth of caring in her heart, reminding her that she really has friends to care for her. Mell herself decides to come out of her house for the first time and meet up with Lutz, deciding to become a postman in order to connect everyone's hearts, just like how everyone connected theirs to her. As Lutz is happy with the rabbit's determination, he gave her his red mailbag as a keepsake and leaves.

Mell is then introduced to another friend from Australia, a koala named Lou who recently moved into the Hills to study. Ciel gave her the egg for him to polish on. One day, the egg that Poco entrusted to Mell, on March 1st, is started to crack and later, on March 2nd, was hatched into a young dragon girl named Nina. Ciel explained that Nina is from Nordic Countries, and her egg got washed up onto the lake of Merci Hills. She has no idea who her mother was, confusing Mell and her friends about her origin but decided to find out who Nina's mother was. Ciel asked Nina if she can handle the mission of taking care of the egg and she agrees. On each hardship she and her friends endure, they never forgot their mission of polishing the eggs. But each of them has their own goal: Marin's goal is to have good food, Poco's goal is to make everyone laugh and smile, Chico's goal is to find the charming points to her friends, Aro's goal is to believe in someone, Lou's goal is to confront each difficulty and obstacle he faces, Nina's goal is to find her mother and Mell's goal is to connect everyone's hearts. In those times, each of the eggs that have been polished changed its colors. Mell then received a letter from Lutz along with a souvenir: a keychain with red Masai beads. Mell keeps it as a lucky charm.

One day Nina finds a circus flyer with the main attraction being a dragon who can breathe an Aurora Flame, she feels that this is her mother and starts crying. And later, in Merci Hills, a circus came to town with the main attraction a dragon who can use the Aurora Flame. She was a great performer in the circus and believed from the rumors that she could be Nina's mother. As the day of the performance came, everyone went to see the dragon and find out if she is Nina's mother. Nina is very anxious, thinking that she may not be the one she's been searching for. As the dragon blows its Aurora Flame, everyone was dazzled and amazed by the colors. At long last, Nina is happy that she finally found her mother, continuing her performance in the circus. After the performance, Nina's mother asked Mell to deliver a very special letter to Nina before leaving Merci Hills. Nina received the letter from her mother through Mell later on, saying how she was doing. At the same time, the last egg has shone in its bright color. As the seven eggs were gathered, a rainbow formed above the skies of Merci Hills, connecting it to the human world.

However, during the fortunate event, Mell received a special letter from the college students in Japan, saying that she can deliver and connect the feelings of everyone there. Mell accepted the mission and decided to cross the Rainbow Bridge, leaving Merci Hills as she ventures to Japan to connect everyone's feelings in the human world. The others were studying back at Merci Hills to fulfill their goals.

=== Chapter 2: Strange new Creatures ===
The second chapter of the series focuses on Mell visiting the human world for the first time as well as introducing to two new characters in Merci Hills: Roseanne, a purple alpaca and Maimai, a pink girl puppy. The story mostly focuses on the meeting between Mell and Maimai and the mysteries behind the Prism Candy.

== Characters ==
Mell (メル, Meru)
Mell (Born on September 20) is a white rabbit from France, who lives in Merci Hills for a long time. She is withdrawn from everyone and thinks she doesn't have any friends to care for her. Until the letters sent by everyone reminded her she has friends to support her and decided to leave her egg-shaped house for the first time. Mell's tail is dyed in various pastel colors, though it is white in the prologue, since her birth. She is considered a bit of a scatterbrain, but nevertheless she has a kind and sincere heart. Mell has a great admiration for Lutz, who once delivered a very special letter to her that warmed her heart. Mell has Lutz's red mailbag as a keepsake when he left Merci Hills and went to Kenya, only returning once to see how she's doing. Mell is guided by Ciel and her mission is to connect the feelings of others as a postman of Merci Hills. She also has the ability to go to the human world by crossing the rainbow at the foot of the Rainbow Post Office. Mell became an honorary staff member of Sanrio Puroland in 2014 and currently works in the post office. She also starred in a live-action series of shorts found on Sanrio Puroland's official Youtube channel where she can be seen working along with meeting guests. Her mail bird is Sunday (サンディ, Sandi).

Ciel (シエル, Shieru)
Ciel is a rainbow fairy who looks after the denizens of Merci Hills. She lives in the "Fairy Tree" which is at the center of Merci Hills. She acts as the narrator of the story in the blogs and is Mell's conscience.

Chico (チーコ, Chīko)
Chico (Born on March 31) is a purple cat from Japan and one of Mell's best friends. Chico is very capricious and yet impatient, sometimes wanting to go to her own way. Her tail is dyed with pink and purple stripes, inspiring Mell to dye her tail. She loves fashion and gossip but has rivalry issues with Roseanne. Her mail bird is Saturday (サタディ, Satadi).

Poco (ポコ, Poko)
Poco (Born on December 3) is a blue and white panda from China and one of Mell's best friends. Poco is rather klutzy, cheerful, and energetic. He sometimes loves gags and likes listening to Maimai's concerts. He brought a strange egg to Mell, which later hatched into a dragon named Nina. His mail bird is Wednesday (ウェンズディ, Uenzudi).

Marin (マリン, Marin)
Marin (Born on July 3) is a green and yellow turtle from Hawaii. She has a multicolored shell on her back and wears a purple bow on her head. She likes food, though occasionally sometimes has a scatterbrained personality like Mell. Her mail bird is Thursday (サーズディ, Sāzudi).

Aro (アロ, Aro)
Aro (Born on May 7) is a light brown bear from the United Kingdom. He is a very good photographer and good at handling his camera. He is the most rational of the students in Merci Hills. He usually goes along with Roseanne during his visit to his bar. His mail bird is Tuesday (チューズディ, Chūzudi).

Nina (ニィナ, Nyina)
Nina (Born on March 2) is a green dragon from the Nordic countries. Once debuting as an egg given to her by Poco, the egg hatched into a dragon, surprising both her and Poco. She is quite young though caring, sometimes wondering who her real parents are. In the Miracle Circus short, she saw her true mother in the performance as well as the Aurora Flame that she's searching for. In the later story blog, Nina received a letter from her mother for the first time. Her mail bird is Friday (フライディ, Furaidi).

Lou (ルゥ, Ruu)
Lou (Born on November 11) is a pink koala from Australia. Lou is a very active character of the students, being cheeky and strong. He loves to play soccer, but sometimes has a bit of a rivalry with Aro. In the story, he leaves Merci Hills and went back to his home country for Christmas Day. He later returns in Merci Hills with a souvenir to Poco: a yellow clown bag, that makes a laughing sound and making anyone laugh, when touched. His mail bird is Monday (マンディ, Mandi).

Lutz (ルッツ, Ruttsu)
Lutz (Born on January 10) is a yellow-furred and blue-maned lion from Kenya. Lutz serves as the postman in Merci Hills while studying in town. As he delivered his letter that opened Mell's heart, he told her that he was leaving Merci Hills to go back to his country after his study, telling her to take care of things while he's gone. He gave her his red mailbag as a keepsake. Usually, he knows Maimai and Roseanne once before meeting Mell and his mane style was once messy until Roseanne styled it.

Roseanne (ロザンヌ, Rozan'nu)
Roseanne (Born on February 14) is a purple alpaca from Italy, who debuted in the second chapter of the character series. He is a choreographer who likes to dance and likes boys. Roseanne serves as Maimai's manager and knows Lutz for a long time, though he has rivalry issues with Chico. Roseanne works as a bartender at the Roseanne Bar, where Aro sometimes has a drink and discusses his problems with him.

Maimai (マイマイ, Maimai)
Maimai (Born on October 28) is a pink puppy from Japan, who debuted in the second chapter of the character series. Maimai is a singer and diva, who is very good at singing and knows both Lutz and Roseanne for a long time. She likes watermelon and has a very friendly and caring personality. In the short "Maimai's Humming Concert", she performed a song for the denizens of Merci Hills, which caught Mell's attention and she later met her for the first time. The girls became best friends later on. Maimai is based on the Japanese singer Mai Kuraki and Sanrio collaborated with Northern Music for the character's creation.

Buzzy (バジー, Bajī)
Buzzy (birthdate unknown) is a yellow and black striped honey bee, who appeared in the second chapter of the series. She moved to Merci Hills and made her residence in the Cafe Merci Lake, on the northeast side of Merci Hills. Mell first meet her while passing through the cafe, seeing her unpacking her stuff. She made friends with her and then invited her for some tea. Both girls became friends later on. Buzzy then decides to leave the hills to set her new journey to enjoy tea from all across the world. She said goodbye to Mell afterward. After she left, she left a jar of honey in the Lakeside cafe for Mell as a remembrance.

Buzzy herself is one of the creations of Utako Yamada, who first appeared in the children's book Buzzy the Honeybee (みつばちバジーちゃん, Mitsuba chi bajī-chan), which was published in October 2006. She is also the mascot character of Karel Capek, a tea shop in Japan, and Sanrio collaborated with the company to make merchandise and tea-related goods based on the Wish me mell series.

== Media ==
=== Animated shorts ===
Several animated shorts that coincides with the storyline of the series were released by Sanrio and animated by Fanworks, who animated The Bears' School and Hanoka. The first short, "Miracle Circus" is released in June 2011, limited to Mobile Users only. It was released on YouTube several days later. The second short, "Maimai's Humming Concert" is also connected to the story blogs, which explains how Mell met Maimai.

=== Books ===
Shufunotomo published a storybook based on the series titled Wish me mell: Rainbow Colored Words (Wish me mell ～虹色のコトバ～, Uisshu mī meru ~Nijiiro no kotoba~) on May 26, 2011.

=== Live appearances ===
The titular character appeared in Sanrio Puroland live shows, sometimes featuring other Sanrio characters.

== Reception ==
Wish me mell was dubbed as the 17th highly voted Sanrio character franchise in the 26th Sanrio Character Ranking in 2011. In 2012, after the introduction of Maimai, Mell became the 12th highly voted Sanrio character while Maimai became the 14th highly voted Sanrio character in the 27th Sanrio Character Ranking.
