= Utako =

Utako is a Japanese female given name. Notable people with the name include:

- Utako Hanazono (1905–1982), Japanese writer, modern dancer, geisha and a Japanese traditional dance master
- Hayashi Utako (1865–1946), Japanese educator and social worker
- Nakajima Utako (1844–1903), Japanese waka and tanka poet and conservatory founder
- Utako Okamoto (1918–2016), Japanese medical doctor, medical scientist, academic
- Utako Shimoda (1854–1936), Japanese educator, poet of the Meiji and Taishō period
- Utako Takeuchi (born 1915), Japanese journalist and politician
- Utako Wakamatsu (born 1981), Japanese former competitive figure skater
- Utako Yamada, Japanese writer, illustrator and translator
