= List of titles by Green Bunny =

Green Bunny (グリーンバニー, Gurīn Banī) was a Japanese animation label for Access-A INC. (株式会社アクセスエー) beginning in 2003, specializing in the production of hentai OVAs. It is a subdivision of the Japanese corporation Happinet, owned by Bandai Namco Holdings.

As of July 3, 2006, the official site announced the closure of its site on July 31, 2006. Access-A INC. later abandoned the Green Bunny label sometime later, before November 2006. Some Green Bunny titles were later published by MS Pictures.

== Titles ==
The following is a list of notable titles from Green Bunny. Some of the Green Bunny releases are licensed by Anime Works by removing all of the sex scenes, but not the nudity.

=== 1997–1999 ===
Title	Japanese title	No. of episodes	Start date	End date
Tokio Kidou Police (Tokio Private Police)	ＴＯＫＩＯ機動ポリス	2	July 21, 1997	August 21, 1997
Kite	A カイト	2	February 25, 1998	October 25, 1998
Midnight Panther	ミッドナイトパンサー	2	August 25, 1998	December 18, 1998
Gakuen Sodom (Professor Pain)	学園ソドム	2	August 25, 1998	April 25, 1999
Gosenzo San-e (Masquerade)	御先祖賛江	4	September 25, 1998	March 25, 1999
SpaceOfera Agga Ruter (Spaceship Agga Reuter)	SpaceOfera アッガ・ルター	4	October 25, 1998	April 25, 1999
Natural (Teacher's Pet)	ナチュラル	4	February 25, 1999	June 25, 2000
Detective File.1: Kindan no Ai (Bondage House)	ディテクティブ file.1 禁断の愛	1	May 25, 1999	—N/a
Words Worth	ワーズ･ワース	5	August 25, 1999	November 25, 2000
G-Taste	ジィ・テイスト	7	December 18, 1999	April 24, 2003

=== 2000–2005 ===
Title	Japanese title	No. of episodes	Date
De:vadasy	創世聖紀デヴァダシー	3	2000
Mezzo Forte	メゾフォルテ	2	2000
Oni-Tensei	鬼点睛	4	2000
Yarima Queen (Sex Demon Queen)	ヤーリマクィーン	1	2000
Zoku Gosenzo	続・御先祖賛江	4	2000
Bakuhatsu Sunzen!! Tenshi no Countdown (Countdown to Delight)	爆発寸前！！ 天使のカウントダウン	1	2001
Custom Dorei (Custom Slave)	カスタム奴隷	1	2001
él	エル	2	2001
Inma Seiden	新世紀 淫魔聖伝	6	2001
Inju Gakuen Fukkatsu (La Blue Girl Returns)	淫獣学園 復活篇	4	2001
Karakara-sama no Himitsu	カラカラ様のひみつ	1	2001
Kowaremono (Kowaremono: Fragile Hearts)	こわれものII	2	2001
Natural Obsessions 2	ナチュラル2 デュオ	4	2001
Pure Mail	ピュアメール	2	2001
Ryoujoku no Machi (City of Sin)	凌辱の都市 〜狂宴のセレモニー〜	1	2001
See In	SeeIn青 -シーンAO-	2	2001
Virgin Night	初夜 -ヴァージン・ナイト-	1	2001
Gakuen Maria—Bakunyū Teachers	学園まりあ ～爆乳ティーチャーズ～	1	2002
Nijuso Wana ni Ochita Onnatachi	二重奏〜罠に落ちた女たち〜	1	2002
Tsubaki-iro no Prigione (Heritage From Father)	椿色のプリジオーネ	3	2002
Words Worth Gaiden (Wordsworth: Outer Story)	ワーズ・ワース外伝	2	2002
Yoru ga Kuru! (Square of the Moon)	夜が来る!	4	2002
Daiakuji	大悪司	8	2003
Genmukan ~Aiyoku to Ryojoku no Inzai~	幻夢館〜愛欲と凌辱の淫罪〜	2	2003
Hotaruko (Crimson Climax)	蛍子	3	2003
Imouto de Ikou! (Forbidden Love)	妹でいこう！	2	2003
Lingeries	ランジェリーズ	3	2003
Nikutai Teni (Body Transfer)	肉体転移	2	2003
Sexfriend	セックスフレンド	2	2004
Yoka no Ken (Samurai XXX)	妖香の剣	2	2004
ARISA	もけもけ大正電動娘 ARISA	2	2005
Kuro Ai (Dark Love)	黒愛 一夜妻館・淫口乱乳録	2	2005
Maid in Heaven SuperS	MAID iN HEAVEN SuperS	2	2005
Yakin Byoutou San (Night Shift Nurses: Experiment)	夜勤病棟・参	3	2005

=== Re-releases ===
Title	Japanese title	No. of episodes	Start date	End date
Orchid Emblem	オーキッド☆エンブレム	1	June 21, 1997	—N/a
Advancer Tina	アドバンサー・ティナ	1	August 21, 1997	—N/a
Cream Lemon	くりいむレモン	36	October 25, 1999	August 25, 2000
Kojin Jugyo (Private Psycho Lesson)	個人授業	2	January 25, 2003	—N/a

=== MS Pictures releases ===
- Square of the MOON
- Genmukan ~Aiyoku to Ryojoku no Inzai~
- Sexfriend
- Words Worth Ultimate Pack 02
- Words Worth Ultimate Pack 01
- Daiakuji
- HO TA RU KO
- Natural2 -Duo- Kumiko & Hinami Pack
- Natural2 -Duo- Chisato & Kuu Pack
- Maid in Heaven SuperS
- Gakuen Sodom the guilty party
- Nikutaiteni
- Tsubaki-iro no Prigione Complete Edition
- Kuroai.
- él Complete Edition
- Pure Mail
- 'Kowaremono' II Complete Edition
- SeeIn AO Complete Edition
- Midnight Panther Complete Edition
- Natural Complete Edition
- Natural Another Complete Edition
- Orchid Emblem fukkokuban
- La Blue*Girl fukkakuhen Complete Edition Vol.2
- La Blue*Girl fukkakuhen Complete Edition Vol.1
- Advancer Tina
- Space Ofera Agga Ruter Complete Edition VOL.1
- Space Ofera Agga Ruter Complete Edition VOL.2
- G-Taste Yagisawa Moe. Morimura Nana.Kannazuki Mai hen
- G-Taste Mizukoshi Sayaka.Kawamura Misuzu. Senou Asuka. Shingyouji Yuna hen
- Office Lingeries

== Plots In Green Bunny Hentai ==
Daiakuji - The Xena Buster After getting released from prison, Akuji Yamamoto noticed that the world is a totally different place During his imprisonment, the hierarchal structure flipped upside down, making it a world where the women dominated over men. Militia, churches, businesses and private businesses are operated by a female figure. Men were powerless, being controlled and enslaved by the women in Osaka. Being angered by the situation, Akuji and his partner Satsu begin their payback by teaching the stuck-up girls in Osaka a little lesson.

Body Transfer Kenichi and several of his classmates friends stay after school to look at a new archaeological find, a bizarre looking mirror. Suddenly, the entire school is transported to an alternate dimension and a magic field surrounds it to prevent them from escaping. Also, their minds have switched to other people's bodies. The only way to switch bodies is when their sexual emotions are high. Kenichi must find a way to return everything back to normal until the dimension falls apart.

Sex Demon Queen Kuri and Linna, a pair of two beautiful and deadly sorceresses, live in an age when all manner of unclean beasts and demons wreak havoc on the general population as they seek to gratify their unquenchable lust. Kuri has dedicated her magic to stopping these foul beasts, though her partner would rather cavort with these demons than kill them. However, this odd couple won't stand for rape, and as they rescue a damsel in distress, they are noticed by the Sex Demon Queen, who seeks to have them as her own. Since they resist, the Queen unleashes all the lust within Linna and Kuri, who become powerless to stop their voracious appetites.
