= Utako Yamada =

Japanese writer and illustrator (born 1963)

Utako Yamada 山田 詩子
- Born: 1963 (age 62–63); Nagoya, Aichi Prefecture
- Occupations: Author, illustrator
- Writing career
- Genre: Children
- Website: www.karelcapek.co.jp

Utako Yamada (山田詩子, Yamada utako) is a Japanese writer, illustrator and translator from Tokyo, Japan. She is the author of 3 official children's books, on which the most notable were The Story of Cherry the Pig and Buzzy the Honeybee. She also owns a tea shop named Karel Capek located in Kokubunji, Tokyo. She is married in Tokyo and has two sons.

== Career ==
Utako was born in 1963 in Nagoya, Aichi Prefecture. After graduating in the Ritsumeikan University's Department of Sociology in Kyoto, she moved to Kokubunji, Tokyo, in 1987 and opened her tea shop, Karel Capek which is named after a Czech writer. At the time she is planning on selecting and blending tea, doing recipes and sweet packages, she became active on illustrating and writing stories and creating characters, some of them are based on her real life experiences. In 2002, she opened the Karel Capek Sweets shop in Kichijoji, which focuses on tea and sweets. She also worked on designing products for tea and tea accessories.

Utako created 3 official children's books published in Japan, one which is translated in English. She also translated some of the Winnie the Pooh storybooks in Japanese and write various recipe books regarding tea and sweets. Utako also collaborated with Sanrio to make merchandise and tea-related goods based on the Wish me mell series.

== Major works ==
- British Sweets for Teatime (ティータイムのイギリス菓子, Tītaimu no Igirisu kashi) (November 2003, Bunka Shuppan Kyoku) ISBN 978-4579208791
- Story of Tea: Teatime Diary (紅茶のおはなしティータイムダイアリー, Kōcha no o hanashi tītaimudaiarī) (2002, FELISSIMO) ISBN 978-4894322431
- Story of Tea 3 (紅茶のおはなし3, Kōcha no o hanashi suri) (November 2001, FELISSIMO) ISBN 978-4894322424
- Story of Tea 2 (紅茶のおはなし2, Kōcha no o hanashi tsu) (November 2001, FELISSIMO) ISBN 978-4894322417
- Story of Tea 1 (紅茶のおはなし1, Kōcha no o hanashi wan) (November 2001, FELISSIMO) ISBN 978-4894322400
- My First Tea Book: Life with Delicious Tea (おいしい紅茶のある暮らし, Oishī kōcha no aru kurashi) (November 1998, Media Factory) ISBN 978-4894322400
- Tea Lover's Menu Book (紅茶好きのメニューブック, Kōcha-suki no menyūbukku) (February 1999, Bunka Shuppan Kyoku) ISBN 978-4579206544
- Good Teatime Book (たのしいティータイムブック, Tanoshī tītaimubukku) (October 2001, Shufutoseikatsusha) ISBN 978-4391125535
- The Story of Cherry the Pig (ぶたのチェリーのおはなし, Buta no cherī no ohanashi) (September 2002, Kaiseisha. Translated and Published in English by Barnes & Noble) ISBN 978-4033309705
- Little Rabbit Pipin's Birthday (こうさぎピピンのたんじょうび, Kōsagi pipin no tanjōbi) (October 2003, Kaiseisha) ISBN 978-4033309804
- Buzzy the Honeybee (みつばちバジーちゃん, Mitsuba chi bajī-chan) (October 2006, Kaiseisha) ISBN 978-4032277609
