= Happinet =

Japanese entertainment company

Happinet Corporation
- Logo used since 1991
- Native name: 株式会社ハピネット
- Romanized name: Kabushiki-gaisha Hapinetto
- Formerly: Tōshō Co., Ltd. (1969–1972); Tōshō Corporation (1972–1991)
- Type: Public
- Traded as: TYO: 7552
- Industry: Entertainment
- Founded: June 7, 1969; 57 years ago
- Founder: Hiroshi Kawai
- Headquarters: Komagata, Taitō, Tokyo, Japan
- Area served: Japan
- Products: Toys; Anime; Video games; Home video
- Owner: Bandai Namco Holdings (26.71%)
- Subsidiaries: Happinet Hobby Marketing; Happinet Media Marketing; Maxgames; Happinet Vending Service; Happinet Logistics Service; Broccoli; Happinet America
- Website: www.happinet.co.jp

Happinet Corporation (Japanese: 株式会社ハピネット, Hepburn: Kabushiki-gaisha Hapinetto) is a Japanese entertainment company.

== History ==
In February 1968, Hiroshi Kawai left Bandai to establish his own toy business. Kawai founded Tōshō Co., Ltd. (有限会社トウショウ, Yūgen-gaisha Tōshō) on June 7, 1969. In September 1972, it changed its name to Tōshō Corporation (株式会社トウショウ, Kabushiki-gaisha Tōshō).

Tōshō merged with two other companies, Dairin Inc. (株式会社ダイリン, Kabushiki-gaisha Dairin) and Seikō Inc. (株式会社セイコー, Kabushiki-gaisha Seikō), to form Happinet in October 1991. In November 1994, Bandai acquired shares of Happinet. Happinet first appeared on the Tokyo Stock Exchange in December 1998.

Happinet acquired Beam Entertainment and its adult label, Green Bunny, in December 1999. It renamed the division Happinet Pictures Corporation (株式会社ハピネット・ピクチャーズ, Kabushikigaisha Hapinetto Pikuchāzu) in July 2002.

In October 2023, Happinet became the Japanese film distributor for A24. Happinet has also been the exclusive manufacturer and seller of home video releases in Japan for Sony Pictures Entertainment Japan since May 1, 2024 and Walt Disney Japan since the following October 1. Since July 1, 2025, similar deals with NBCUniversal Entertainment Japan, Warner Bros. Japan and Paramount Pictures International went into effect.

== Products ==
Happinet had an exclusive anime licensing agreement with NuTech Digital in 2003. In addition to producing and distributing anime and films, Happinet acquired the rights to foreign films for Japanese distribution.

TV anime

- Angel's 3Piece!
- B Gata H Kei
- Between the Sky and Sea
- Chrono Crusade
- Citrus
- Daily Lives of High School Boys
- Ancient Ruler Dinosaur King DKidz Adventure: Pterosaur Legend
- Ancient Ruler Dinosaur King DKidz Adventure
- The Familiar of Zero
- Flip Flappers
- Full Metal Panic! The Second Raid
- Full Metal Panic? Fumoffu
- Gin'iro no Olynssis
- Grimoire of Zero
- Iroduku: The World in Colors
- Kakuriyo: Bed and Breakfast for Spirits
- Manyū Hiken-chō
- Operation Han-Gyaku-Sei Million Arthur
- The Price of Smiles
- Rage of Bahamut: Manaria Friends
- Regalia: The Three Sacred Stars
- Rocket Girls
- Romeo × Juliet
- Rosario + Vampire
- Rosario + Vampire capu2
- Shomin Sample
- Xenosaga: The Animation

Anime films

- The Girl Who Leapt Through Time

OVAs

- Kite: International Version
- Mezzo Forte: International Version

Live action films

- The Complex
- Helter Skelter
- Himeanole
- The Host
- Hula Girls
- My Man

Video games

- Brigandine: The Legend of Runersia
- Teenage Mutant Ninja Turtles: Shredder's Revenge (Japanese localization)
