= Harenchi Gakuen =

Japanese manga series by Go Nagai

- First tankōbon volume cover

ハレンチ学園
- Genre: Erotic comedy
- Manga
- Written by: Go Nagai
- Published by: Shueisha
- Imprint: Jump Comics
- Magazine: Weekly Shōnen Jump
- Original run: August 1, 1968 – September 25, 1972
- Volumes: 13
Further information
Live-action film
Directed by	Yuji Tanno
Written by	Gan Yamasaki; Tatsuhiko Kamoi
Music by	Naozumi Yamamoto
Studio	Nikkatsu
Released	May 2, 1970
Runtime	82 minutes
Live-action film
Harenchi Gakuen: Shintai Kensa no Maki
Directed by	Yuji Tanno
Written by	Gan Yamasaki; Tatsuhiko Kamoi
Music by	Naozumi Yamamoto
Studio	Nikkatsu
Released	August 1, 1970
Runtime	85 minutes
Live-action film
Harenchi Gakuen: Tackle Kiss no Maki
Directed by	Isao Hayashi
Produced by	Sanehiko Sonoda; Kunifumi Tokieda
Written by	Tatsuhiko Kamoi
Music by	Hajime Kaburagi
Studio	Nikkatsu
Released	September 12, 1970
Runtime	83 minutes
Television drama
Directed by	Yoneyuki Shibata; Yuji Tanno
Written by	Keishi Kubota; Tatsuhiko Kamoi
Original network	Tokyo Channel 12 (now TV Tokyo)
Original run	October 1, 1970 – April 1, 1971
Episodes	27
Live-action film
Shin Harenchi Gakuen
Directed by	Isao Hayashi
Produced by	Sanehiko Sonoda; Kunifumi Tokieda
Written by	Gan Yamasaki; Tatsuhiko Kamoi
Music by	Hajime Kaburagi
Studio	Nikkatsu
Released	January 3, 1971
Runtime	83 minutes
Manga
Heisei Harenchi Gakuen
Written by	Go Nagai
Published by	Nihon Bungeisha; Jitsugyo no Nihon Sha
Magazine	Weekly Manga Goraku; Weekly Manga Sunday
Original run	May 13, 1994 – December 12, 1995
Live-action film
Heisei Harenchi Gakuen
Directed by	Hiroyuki Muramatsu
Written by	Junki Takegami
Studio	GAGA Communications; Tokuma Shoten
Released	February 2, 1996
Runtime	82 minutes
Original video animation
Heisei Harenchi Gakuen
Directed by	Toshō Noma
Music by	BANG HEADS
Studio	Pink Pineapple; Wise Guy
Released	March 1, 1996
Runtime	47 minutes
Manga
Harenchi Gakuen: The Company
Written by	Go Nagai; Teruto Aruga
Illustrated by	Teruto Aruga
Published by	Shueisha
Magazine	Business Jump
Original run	March 1, 2007 – April 16, 2008
Volumes	3
- icon

Harenchi Gakuen (ハレンチ学園; lit. 'Shameless School') is a Japanese manga series written and illustrated by Go Nagai. The manga was one of the first to be serialized in Shueisha's shōnen manga magazine Weekly Shōnen Jump, where it ran from 1968 to 1972, with its chapters collected in thirteen tankōbon volumes. A modern-day version of the manga, Heisei Harenchi Gakuen, was serialized by Nihon Bungeisha and Jitsugyo no Nihon Sha in Weekly Manga Goraku and Weekly Manga Sunday, respectively, from 1994 to 1995. A sequel to the original series, illustrated by Teruto Aruga and titled Harenchi Gakuen: The Company, was serialized in Shueisha's Business Jump from 2007 to 2008.

Harenchi Gakuen was adapted into four live-action films and a twenty-seven-episode Japanese television drama. Heisei Harenchi Gakuen was adapted into a direct to video live-action film and an original video animation (OVA).

Harenchi Gakuen became the first big success for Nagai and is widely considered the first modern erotic manga and credited for being the first ecchi manga series.

== Characters ==
Yasohachi Yamagishi (山岸 八十八, Yamagishi Yasohachi)
Portrayed by: Kenbō Kaminarimon (Harenchi Gakuen), Masahiro Oyake (Shintai Kensa no Maki), Hiroshi Chiba (Tackle Kiss no Maki, Shin Harenchi Gakuen), Fumihiko Kobayashi (drama)
Voiced by: Yoshiyuki Yamaguchi
AKA Boss (親分, Oyabun). The violent yet pure hearted protagonist. He is the son of a butcher. He is assumed dead at the end of the 1st series, but is alive in part 2.
Mitsuko Yagyū (柳生 みつ子, Yagyū Mitsuko)
Portrayed by: Kenbō Kaminarimon (Harenchi Gakuen), Masahiro Oyake (Shintai Kensa no Maki), Hiroshi Chiba (Tackle Kiss no Maki, Shin Harenchi Gakuen), Fumihiko Kobayashi (drama)
Voiced by: Yoshiyuki Yamaguchi
Portrayed by: Miyuki Kojima
AKA Jūbei (十兵衛). The beautiful descendant of the Yagyū ninja family and the heroine of the story. Like Yamagishi, she is assumed dead at the end of the 1st series, but seen alive in part 2.
Fukurokōji (袋小路, Fukurokōji)
Portrayed by: Jun Otani (Shintai Kensa no Maki)
AKA Ikidomari (イキドマリ, Ikidomari; Dead End) Yamagishi’s subordinate. During the Harenichi War, the harsh situation forces him to experience shell shock and he commits suicide.
Sayuri Yoshinaga (吉永さゆり, Yoshinaga Sayuri)
AKA Hige Godzilla (ヒゲゴジラ, Hige Gojira; Bearded Godzilla). He greatly resembles a caveman, sporting a bushy beard around his mouth, wearing tiger pelt, and usually carrying a club. A teacher at the school, he speaks in a style of Japanese typically used by women. At the end of the 1st series he is seen severely wounded and crawling away from a pile of dead bodies.

== Production ==
In 1968, while Shueisha was getting prepared to launch its first manga publication, Weekly Shōnen Jump, in order to compete with other magazines from rival companies (like Weekly Shōnen Magazine from Kodansha and Weekly Shōnen Sunday from Shogakukan), Nagai was invited to be one of the first manga artists publishing in the new magazine. He contemplated this, since he had to design a long-running series instead of the autoconclusive short stories that he had been developing until that point. He accepted, and the series became Nagai's first big success when Shōnen Jump sold more than one million copies. With Harenchi Gakuen, Nagai became the originator of ecchi manga, opened the door for a series of taboo-shattering gag comics, and also became the symbol of an entire generation. This work has influenced the world of manga, effecting both social mores and what was considered appropriate for manga.

Harenchi Gakuen started with the idea of making a manga around a school. Nagai liked the word "Harenchi" (scandal), which was used commonly to advertise adult movies. For him, scandal and school were like oil and water, and he thought that mixing them would be funny. At first, Nagai did not have an idea of what stories to develop, but his assistant at the time was boasting about how he had peeped on the girls during their physical examinations from a hole in the roof of his school; this idea was developed into the plot of the manga. Originally, open erotic references did not appear in Harenchi Gakuen. The first physical examination scenes only showed from the shoulders up, but there were a lot of girls drawn, and their images became popular. The editor asked Nagai to go further, which Nagai was eager to do.

The inspiration for Harenchi Gakuen came from the West. Nagai liked foreign movies and used to read Playboy magazine and other erotic magazines when he was a child. For the depiction of breasts, he took particular inspiration from the Venus de Milo. According to Nagai, what he in fact drew was not about eroticism per se, but about Japan's culture of shame. He wanted embarrassment to be the eroticism of the stories.

== Media ==
=== Manga ===
Written and illustrated by Go Nagai, Harenchi Gakuen was serialized in Shueisha's shōnen manga magazine Weekly Shōnen Jump from August 1, 1968, to September 25, 1972. Shueisha collected its chapters in thirteen tankōbon volumes, released from November 30, 1969, to December 31, 1974. The series has been republished in various editions; Shueisha released twelve bunkoban volumes from November 30, 1976, to May 31, 1977. Kodansha released seven volumes from March 6 to September 6, 1986, Tokuma Shoten released seven bunkoban volumes on June 1, 1995; Koike Shoin released six volumes from July 20 to December 20, 2007; for the series 50th anniversary, Shogakukan released six aizoban volumes from June 29 to August 30, 2018.

A modern-day version of the manga, titled Heisei Harenchi Gakuen (平成ハレンチ学園; "Heisei Shameless School"), was serialized by Nihon Bungeisha and Jitsugyo no Nihon Sha in Weekly Manga Goraku and Weekly Manga Sunday, respectively, from May 13, 1994, to December 12, 1995. A sequel to the original series, illustrated by Teruto Aruga and titled Harenchi Gakuen: The Company (ハレンチ学園～ザ・カンパニー～, Harenchi Gakuen ~ Za Kanpanī ~), was serialized in Shueisha's seinen manga magazine Business Jump from 2007 to 2008. Its chapters were collected in three tankōbon volumes, released from August 17, 2007, to June 19, 2008.

=== Live-action films ===
Four live action films were produced by Nikkatsu; the first film, Harenchi Gakuen. premiered on May 2, 1970; the second film, Harenchi Gakuen: Shintai Kensa no Maki, premiered on August 1, 1970; the third film, Harenchi Gakuen: Tackle Kiss no Maki, premiered on September 12, 1970; the fourth film, Shin Harenchi Gakuen, premiered on January 3, 1971. A direct-to-video film, Heisei Harenchi Gakuen, was released by Tokuma Shoten on February 2, 1996.

=== Drama ===
A twenty-seven-episode television drama adaptation was broadcast on Tokyo Channel 12 (now TV Tokyo) from October 1, 1970, to April 1, 1971.

=== Original video animation ===
An original video animation (OVA), based on Heisei Harenchi Gakuen and produced by Pink Pineapple, was released on March 1, 1996. It was re-released on DVD on February 23, 2007.

== Reception ==
Harenchi Gakuen was criticized by some as vulgar because it introduced overt eroticism to children. Male students and teachers were depicted as being preoccupied with catching glimpses of girls' panties or naked bodies. Many parents, women's associations, and PTAs protested.

In particular, the PTA protests over Harenchi Gakuen were notorious. Nagai was bombarded with interview requests from newspapers, magazines and TV. Whenever he flew outside of Tokyo, TV cameras were waiting for him. He was branded a "nuisance" and even an "enemy of society". He, however, had a clear sense of what things he could or could not do with the manga.

At first, Nagai did not think that the opposition was against him, since he was aware of the standards that applied with movies and similar things for an audience below 18 years old. At that time, he never drew sex scenes, avoided pictures of genitals and made nudes cute rather than sexy, though the manga regularly showed male genitals throughout its run, including a castration scene. His fans supported him throughout the PTA protests. They sent him letters where they expressed how they were aware that the adults cracking down on them were reading raunchier stuff than what Nagai was producing.

The PTA managed to prevent the distribution of the magazine in some parts of Japan. As a result of the protests, when the series was about to be cancelled because of the PTA, Nagai changed the theme in Harenchi Gakuen into a more mature and serious matter, from nonsense gags with sexy touches, to a full-scale war where murder was depicted in the bloody way for which many know him. This led to the famous ending of Harenchi Gakuen, symbol of freedom and of rejection of the hypocrisy, where all students and teachers, while defending their freedom of expression, are killed by the PTA and other parental forces. This was the ironic answer that Nagai gave to the PTA. (In the end, this was not the actual ending of Harenchi Gakuen, as the title would subsequently return to publication for several years.)

The protests were not only against the manga, but also against the TV series, which was also extremely popular and remains one of TV Tokyo's highest-rated programs ever with ratings as high as 32% at its peak.
