= Angel (manga) =

Hentai manga series and OVA

- Angel #3 published by Shogakukan (1990)
- Manga
- Written by: U-Jin
- Published by: Shogakukan; Cybele Publishing (Note: While the manga started publishing in 1988, it was interrupted in 1991 after several controversies. As such, Shogakukan edition is incomplete and the manga was completed in tankōbon only.)
- Magazine: Weekly Young Sunday (Note: While the manga was originally published in a non-erotic magazine, it was considered a hentai manga.)
- Original run: 1988 – 1993
- Volumes: 7 (Note: Shogakukan version had only three volumes, but the complete version by Cybele had a total of 7, although with a different length than the other previous volumes)
- Original video animation
- Directed by: Hideki Takayama
- Written by: Muneo Kishi
- Music by: Takeo Miratsu
- Studio: Project Team Mu
- Released: October 25, 1990
- Runtime: 45 minutes
- Video game
- Publisher: Cocktail Soft
- Genre: Simulation
- Platform: NEC PC-9801
- Released: October 1, 1993
- Original video animation

Shin Angel
- Directed by: Hiromitsu Oota (1); Kaoru Tooyoka (2–5)
- Produced by: Osamu Koshinaka; Jirou Souka (1); Saburou Oomiya (2–5)
- Written by: Wataru Amano (1); Koji Sakakibara (2–5)
- Music by: Keisaku Irie
- Studio: Triple X
- Licensed by: NA: SoftCel Pictures
- Released: October 21, 1994 – November 22, 1995
- Runtime: 29–46 minutes
- Episodes: 5
- Live-action film

Angel: Ichiban Saisho wa Anata ni A.Ge.Ru
- Studio: dez
- Licensed by: NA: Kitty Media
- Released: February 14, 1997
- Runtime: 66 minutes
- Live-action film

Angel: Shotai Fumei no Joo-sama!? (Hen)
- Studio: dez
- Licensed by: NA: Kitty Media
- Released: April 4, 1997
- Runtime: 70 minutes
- Manga

Angel: the women whom delivery host Kosuke Atami healed
- Written by: U-Jin
- Published by: Nihon Bungeisha
- Magazine: Weekly Manga Goraku
- Original run: 2006 – 2008
- Volumes: 5
- Manga

Angel season 2: the women whom delivery host Kosuke Atami healed
- Written by: U-Jin
- Published by: Nihon Bungeisha
- Magazine: Weekly Manga Goraku
- Original run: 2008 – 2010
- Volumes: 5

Angel is a hentai manga series written and illustrated by U-Jin. The original manga series met with controversy in 1990–1991 in Japan and was retired from its magazine serialization. It was adapted into an OVA of the same name. The manga was also succeeded by a manga called Angel: the women whom delivery host Kosuke Atami healed, and succeeded again by another manga called Angel: the women whom delivery host Kosuke Atami healed season 2.

== Original manga publication ==
Angel, also known as Angel: Highschool Sexual Bad Boys & Girls Story (prior to the Japanese controversy), Angel: Delight Slight Light Kiss Story (after it resumed serialization but before its complete ban) and currently Angel: Sexual boys and girls highschool story (in order to differentiate it from the sequels), started its publication in the magazine Weekly Young Sunday published by Shogakukan. Because of the controversy, its serialization was interrupted in 1991 and only three volumes were published by Shogakukan. It was later fully reprinted by Cybele Publishing (also known as Cybele Shuppan), which also included two new volumes for a total of 7 volumes, although Cybele volumes had in fact less pages than Shogakukan volumes. In the cover of the Cybele volumes, the legend "We came back!" can be read above the title, in reference to the incident that provoked its temporal ban. The manga was published in Taiwan by company Li-Yi, in France by Tonkam and in Spain by Norma Editorial in Cybele's edition.

=== Volumes ===
- Shogakukan (Young Sunday Comics, 1989–1990)

Japanese release date	Vol.	ISBN
June 1989	1	4091511414
December 1989	2	4091511422
April 1990	3	4091511430

- Cybele Publishing (Cybele Comics, 1993) This version includes several autostereograms. Since foreign versions were based on this one, they also include the autostereograms.

Japanese release date	Vol.	ISBN
June 1993	1	4915858758
July 1993	2	4915858782
September 1993	3	4915858812
September 1993	4	4915858847
October 1993	5	4915858871
November 1993	6	4915858901
December 1993	7	4915858944

- Cybele Publishing (Cybele Bunko, 1995–1996)

Japanese release date	Vol.	ISBN
November 1995	1	488332401X
December 1995	2	4883324052
January 1996	3	4883324079
March 1996	4	4883324117
April 1996	5	4883324133
May 1996	6	488332415X

- Ohzora Publishing (also known as Chu Shuppan) (Missy Comics, 2007–2008)

Japanese release date	Vol.	ISBN
October 2007	1	978-4776793946
October 2007	2	978-4776793953
November 2007	3	978-4776794127
December 2007	4	978-4776794264
January 17, 2008	5	978-4776794400

Along with this volumes, there is another collection which combines Angel with Konai Shasei, another manga by U-Jin. The collection is simply called Konai Shasei X Angel (校内写生×ANGEL, kōnai shasei x angel). Instead of a regular numbering, each volume has a different subtitle.

- Ohzora Publishing (Missy Comics, 2006–2007)

Japanese release date	Vol.	ISBN
February 2006	Densha Bishōjo Hen	4776719002
May 2006	Gakuen Bishōjo Hen	4776719428
July 2006	Hokago Bishōjo Hen	4776719762
September 2006	Koisuru Bishōjo Hen	4776720280
October 2006	Imouto Kei Bishōjo Hen	477672068X
February 2007	Junkoi Bishōjo Hen	4776721368
April 2007	Shiroi Bishōjo Hen	978-4776721796

The series is also available in ebook format by eBookJapan.

== Media ==
=== OVAs ===

==== Angel ====
The first OVA, a single episode anime titled Angel, was released on VHS and LaserDisc on October 25, 1990 by Pioneer LDC's brand Humming Bird. It was later re-released by Tairiku Shobo. A DVD of the anime was released in October 25, 2001 by Happinet Pictures (a division of Namco Bandai) through their Green Bunny label with standard number GBBH-1896.

==== New Angel ====
The second OVA consisted of five episodes. New Angel (新・エンジェル, Shin Enjeru), was originally released from October 21, 1994 to November 22, 1995. It was produced by Pink Pineapple and Triple X.

No.	Title	Length	Original release date
1	"New Angel" "shin enjeru" (Japanese: 新・エンジェル)	46 mins.	October 21, 1994
While taking obscene pictures, Kozuke and his classmate, Shinoyama meet a girl who smiles at Kozuke. Shinoyama snaps a photo and they later find out that she is supposedly a ghost. Shinoyama spreads the rumor that Kozuke is cursed and everyone at school avoids him, excepting Shizuka. She suggests that they go to a medium for help. While Shizuka waits, Kozuke finds that the medium is an attractive woman with whom he must make 'physical contact' (sex) in order to remove the curse. But the curse is not removed. Later, a guy tells Kozuke that the 'ghost girl' wants to meet with him. While meeting the girl Kozuke faints, waking up to find that the girl is giving him a blowjob and they have sex. Kozuke discovers that the girl is indeed a ghost. He meets Shizuka outside a temple and then goes after Shinoyama for spreading the false rumor.
2	"Flying Angel" "soratobu tenshi" (Japanese: 空飛ぶ天使)	29 mins.	April 21, 1995
While meeting with Yamada, Kozuke sees Ochiai Miki trying to commit suicide. Kozuke convinces her to have sex with him before that. He finds out that Kawamura Kunihiko threw out Miki's love note without reading it. With the help of Shizuka, Kozuke finds that Kawamura never got Miki's note. Kozuke later discovers that Kawamura also wrote his own love note. They try to find Miki, but the girl behind the problems stops Kozuke and takes off with Kawamura. She later has sex with Kozuke to obtain pictures for blackmailing. When Shizuka goes to find Kawamura while Kozuke goes to watch Miki, the mysterious girl tries to blackmail Shizuka. Shizuka instead beats her up to find Kawamura's location. As part of Kozuke's plan, Miki falls of a plane with a parachute, coming to the conclusion that she doesn't want to die. Afterwards, Kawamura and Miki confess their feelings.
3	"Blue Experience" "aoi taiken" (Japanese: 青い体験)	29 mins.	June 30, 1995
4	"A Bride for a Week" "isshuukan no hanayome" (Japanese: 一週間の花嫁)	33 mins.	August 25, 1995
5	"The Last Night" "saigo no yoru" (Japanese: 最後の夜)	31 mins.	November 22, 1995

In the US, the OVA has been released by SoftCel Pictures. It was originally released in VHS format in 1995, 1996 and 1998 and it was released in both uncut and edited versions for the first four episodes. It was also released in DVD format by the same company in two volumes, the first released in May 13, 2003 and the second in June 24, 2003.

Shin Angel was also released in France, in VHS by Katsumi vidéo and in DVD by Anime Erotik, and also in Spain in VHS and DVD by Manga Films (although only the first 4 episodes were released by Manga Films) and on TV by Arait Multimedia.

=== Video games ===
A video game for the NEC PC-9801 based on Angel and with the same title was released in October 1, 1993 by the Japanese company Cocktail Soft.

=== Live-action films ===
Two adult live-action films based on the manga were produced. The first one, Angel: Ichiban Saisho wa Anata ni A.Ge.Ru (エンジェル 一番最初はあなたにア・ゲ・ル, enjeru ichiban saisho wa anata ni a.ge.ru), was released in February 14, 1997 and the second one, Angel: Shotai Fumei no Joo-sama!? (Hen) (エンジェル 正体不明の女王様！？【編】, enjeru shōtai fumei no joō-sama!? hen), was released in April 4, 1997. Both films have the participation of Japanese Adult Video actresses Yui Kawana and Mizuki Kanno and were released by the company dez.

Both films were released in the US by Kitty Media in DVD format in July 8, 2008 as a single release called Angel Collection.

=== Manga sequels ===
In 2006, a sequel of the original manga started in the magazine Weekly Manga Goraku published by Nihon Bungeisha, titled Angel: the women whom delivery host Kosuke Atami healed, also known as Angel: Renai Hoshi Jin Atami Kosuke (ANGEL～恋愛奉仕人・熱海康介～, ren'ai hōshi jin atami kōsuke) and more commonly simply as Angel. Also created by U-Jin, this manga follows the new adventures of Kosuke Atami, now a divorced 34-year-old man who works as a host and helps people in a similar way as he did as a highschooler.

No.	Release date	ISBN
1	November 17, 2006	978-4-537-10555-1
2	May 18, 2007	978-4-537-10654-1
3	September 20, 2007	978-4-537-10708-1
4	February 18, 2008	978-4-537-10790-6
5	June 19, 2008	978-4-537-10839-2

Following the previous sequel, in 2008, also in Nihon Bungeisha's Weekly Manga Goraku, the manga titled Angel season 2: the women whom delivery host Kosuke Atami healed, more commonly known as Angel season 2, was released. Also done by U-Jin, the manga follows the same premise as the previous manga series.

No.	Release date	ISBN
1	December 19, 2008	978-4-537-10912-2
2	May 20, 2009	978-4-537-10960-3
3	December 9, 2009	978-4-537-12538-2
4	May 10, 2010	978-4-537-12597-9
5	October 8, 2010	978-4-537-12648-8

== Reception ==
=== Criticism and controversy in Japan ===
The manga depicted high schoolers in several sexual situations. In the aftermath of the Saitama serial kidnapping murders of young girls, a moral panic against otaku was prevalent and several manga were singled out for their contents, among them Angel. PTAs managed to force the suspension of the manga for a while and volume 3 became the last by Shogakukan and the tankōbon became banned. The problem centered in housewives who believed that Angel was too sexually explicit for a seinen publication and that the manga had become pretty popular. The incident with Angel eventually lead to the creation of the Comic Hyogen no Jiyu o Mamoru Kai (コミック表現の自由を守る会, komikku hyōgen no jiyū o mamoru kai; loosely translated as Committee to protect the freedom of expression in Comic).

While the manga was still being serialized in the magazine, U-Jin included a "message from the author" chapter as a form of protest. When it temporary resumed serialization, the sexual content was reduced and the subtitle changed to Delight Slight Light Kiss Story, until it was finally banned.

Eventually, publication resumed years later with Cybele Publishing, which re-published Angel since the beginning to eventually publish the complete manga, now labeled as Adult Comic (成人コミック, seijin komikku).

=== Youth controversy in France ===
Upon the release of the third volume in France, Angel was banned from exhibition in stores. The argument of anti-manga people, relayed by the press at the time, was that the manga is dangerous for youth because of eroticism and violence it diffuses. Tonkam, however, for which Angel was the first erotic manga, finished the translation of the 7 volumes.

=== New Angel ===
Stig Høgset, writing for THEM Anime Reviews, found New Angel technically good, as the art and animation were good, but felt the story was "boring and stupid". Chris Beveridge noted that the episodes were not scripted by U-Jin, thus lacking some of his distinctive style, and feels that it is an example of a hentai series which merely "spices up" a "regular" anime series. Bamboo Dong, writing for Anime News Network, felt that the writing of the series made it "fun to watch", with humour and interesting backgrounds for the female characters, and noted that the sex scenes are "pretty graphic". Bamboo Dong felt the transition between non-sex scenes and sex scenes was not smooth in the second volume.
