= Miyuki (disambiguation) =

Miyuki is a feminine Japanese given name.

Miyuki may also refer to:

- Miyuki (manga), a Japanese manga series by Mitsuru Adachi
- Japanese destroyer Miyuki, a Fubuki-class destroyer in the Imperial Japanese Navy prior to World War II
- Miyuki, the 29th scroll of The Tale of Genji

== People with the surname ==
- Hidetoshi Miyuki (三幸 秀稔, born 1993), Japanese footballer
- Sanae Miyuki (深雪 さなえ, born 1959), Japanese voice actress
