= Minami no Teiō =

Japanese manga series

- First tankōbon volume cover, featuring Ginjirou Manda

ミナミの帝王
- Manga
- Written by: Dai Tennōji
- Illustrated by: Rikiya Gō
- Published by: Nihon Bungeisha
- Magazine: Weekly Manga Goraku
- Original run: 1992 – 2026
- Volumes: 188
- Manga

Minami no Teiō: Young-hen
- Written by: Dai Tennōji
- Illustrated by: Rikiya Gō
- Published by: Nihon Bungeisha
- Magazine: Weekly Manga Goraku
- Original run: 2006 – 2013
- Volumes: 9
- Original video animation

Naniwa Kinyuu Den: Minami no Teiou
- Directed by: Yoshitaka Fujimoto
- Produced by: Hiroshi Iwakura
- Written by: Yuu Yamamoto
- Music by: Hiroyuki Ishizuka
- Studio: Studio Kikan
- Released: 22 September 1993 – 27 May 1994
- Runtime: 46 minutes
- Live-action television film

Nanba Kin'yū-den Minami no Teiō Tokubetsu-hen Mitsuyaku
- Released: 21 December 1996
- Live-action television film

Shin Minami no Teiō
- Released: 21 September 2010
- icon

Minami no Teiō (ミナミの帝王; lit. 'King of Minami') is a Japanese manga series written by Dai Tennōji and illustrated by Rikiya Gō. It has been serialized in Nihon Bungeisha's Weekly Manga Goraku from 1992 to 2026. It is one of the longest manga series, with 188 volumes published. It has been adapted into several live-action films, including original videos and two television films and also into two original video animations.

== Premise ==
Set in Osaka Minami, the story follows Ginjiro Manda (萬田銀次郎), a ruthless loan shark who charges ten percent interest every ten days. Feared as the "Demon of Minami", Manda is uncompromising in his collection methods and is infamous for pursuing those who flee.

== Media ==
=== Manga ===
Written by Dai Tennōji and illustrated Rikiya Gō, Minami no Teiō started it serialization in Nihon Bungeisha's Weekly Manga Goraku in 1992. It finished after 34 years in the magazine on 27 February 2026. Nihon Bungeisha released its first tankōbon volume on 16 March 1992. The 188th and last volume was released on 9 April 2026.

==== Volumes ====
No.	Release date	ISBN
1	16 March 1992	978-4-537-03744-9
2	3 June 1992	978-4-537-03759-3
3	2 September 1992	978-4-537-03778-4
4	16 November 1992	978-4-537-03793-7
5	3 March 1993	978-4-537-03816-3
6	28 April 1993	978-4-537-03830-9
7	1 July 1993	978-4-537-03842-2
8	1 September 1993	978-4-537-03854-5
9	1 November 1993	978-4-537-03866-8
10	9 February 1994	978-4-537-03878-1
11	9 April 1994	978-4-537-03891-0
12	9 June 1994	978-4-537-03904-7
13	9 August 1994	978-4-537-03917-7
14	8 October 1994	978-4-537-03929-0
15	9 December 1994	978-4-537-03943-6
16	9 February 1995	978-4-537-03956-6
17	7 April 1995	978-4-537-03969-6
18	9 June 1995	978-4-537-03982-5
19	9 August 1995	978-4-537-03995-5
20	9 October 1995	978-4-537-09607-1
21	16 December 1995	978-4-537-09623-1
22	10 February 1996	978-4-537-09643-9
23	6 April 1996	978-4-537-09656-9
24	7 June 1996	978-4-537-09666-8
25	5 August 1996	978-4-537-09675-0
26	9 October 1996	978-4-537-09684-2
27	5 December 1996	978-4-537-09696-5
28	7 February 1997	978-4-537-09706-1
29	9 April 1997	978-4-537-09718-4
30	9 June 1997	978-4-537-09728-3
31	9 August 1997	978-4-537-09738-2
32	9 October 1997	978-4-537-09749-8
33	5 December 1997	978-4-537-09760-3
34	9 February 1998	978-4-537-09770-2
35	9 April 1998	978-4-537-09779-5
36	9 June 1998	978-4-537-09788-7
37	8 August 1998	978-4-537-09797-9
38	8 October 1998	978-4-537-09806-8
39	7 December 1998	978-4-537-09817-4
40	9 February 1999	978-4-537-09828-0
41	8 April 1999	978-4-537-09840-2
42	9 June 1999	978-4-537-09849-5
43	7 August 1999	978-4-537-09859-4
44	9 October 1999	978-4-537-09874-7
45	6 December 1999	978-4-537-09884-6
46	19 February 2000	978-4-537-09896-9
47	19 April 2000	978-4-537-09912-6
48	19 June 2000	978-4-537-09924-9
49	6 October 2000	978-4-537-09945-4
50	9 December 2000	978-4-537-09959-1
51	8 February 2001	978-4-537-09973-7
52	9 April 2001	978-4-537-09987-4
53	7 June 2001	978-4-537-10001-3
54	9 August 2001	978-4-537-10018-1
55	9 October 2001	978-4-537-10030-3
56	8 December 2001	978-4-537-10045-7
57	8 February 2002	978-4-537-10060-0
58	9 April 2002	978-4-537-10076-1
59	7 June 2002	978-4-537-10092-1
60	9 August 2002	978-4-537-10108-9
61	9 October 2002	978-4-537-10126-3
62	9 December 2002	978-4-537-10144-7
63	7 February 2003	978-4-537-10164-5
64	9 April 2003	978-4-537-10183-6
65	9 June 2003	978-4-537-10200-0
66	7 August 2003	978-4-537-10216-1
67	9 October 2003	978-4-537-10233-8
68	9 December 2003	978-4-537-10252-9
69	9 February 2004	978-4-537-10270-3
70	9 April 2004	978-4-537-10286-4
71	9 June 2004	978-4-537-10303-8
72	9 August 2004	978-4-537-10320-5
73	7 October 2004	978-4-537-10339-7
74	9 December 2004	978-4-537-10358-8
75	9 February 2005	978-4-537-10374-8
76	9 June 2005	978-4-537-10408-0
77	10 August 2005	978-4-537-10423-3
78	7 October 2005	978-4-537-10442-4
79	9 December 2005	978-4-537-10458-5
80	9 February 2006	978-4-537-10475-2
81	7 April 2006	978-4-537-10491-2
82	8 June 2006	978-4-537-10501-8
83	9 August 2006	978-4-537-10518-6
84	6 October 2006	978-4-537-10586-5
85	8 December 2006	978-4-537-10557-5
86	9 February 2007	978-4-537-10598-8
87	9 April 2007	978-4-537-10631-2
88	7 June 2007	978-4-537-10649-7
89	9 August 2007	978-4-537-10693-0
90	9 October 2007	978-4-537-10724-1
91	7 December 2007	978-4-537-10753-1
92	9 April 2008	978-4-537-10807-1
93	9 June 2008	978-4-537-10832-3
94	8 August 2008	978-4-537-10858-3
95	9 October 2008	978-4-537-10880-4
96	8 December 2008	978-4-537-10904-7
97	9 February 2009	978-4-537-10926-9
98	9 April 2009	978-4-537-10948-1
99	10 June 2009	978-4-537-10964-1
100	8 August 2009	978-4-537-10988-7
101	8 October 2009	978-4-537-12502-3
102	10 February 2010	978-4-537-12562-7
103	10 April 2010	978-4-537-12582-5
104	28 June 2010	978-4-537-12603-7
105	9 August 2010	978-4-537-12625-9
106	8 October 2010	978-4-537-12646-4
107	8 December 2010	978-4-537-12681-5
108	9 February 2011	978-4-537-12712-6
109	8 April 2011	978-4-537-12730-0
110	16 July 2011	978-4-537-12764-5
111	8 August 2011	978-4-537-12773-7
112	8 October 2011	978-4-537-12792-8
113	9 December 2011	978-4-537-12823-9
114	7 April 2012	978-4-537-12873-4
115	8 June 2012	978-4-537-12894-9
116	9 August 2012	978-4-537-12918-2
117	9 October 2012	978-4-537-12939-7
118	7 December 2012	978-4-537-12969-4
119	9 February 2013	978-4-537-12996-0
120	9 April 2013	978-4-537-13019-5
121	7 June 2013	978-4-537-13042-3
122	9 August 2013	978-4-537-13062-1
123	9 December 2013	978-4-537-13106-2
124	8 February 2014	978-4-537-13135-2
125	9 April 2014	978-4-537-13152-9
126	9 June 2014	978-4-537-13172-7
127	9 August 2014	978-4-537-13191-8
128	9 October 2014	978-4-537-13209-0
129	8 December 2014	978-4-537-13235-9
130	9 April 2015	978-4-537-13275-5
131	9 June 2015	978-4-537-13297-7
132	8 August 2015	978-4-537-13323-3
133	9 October 2015	978-4-537-13348-6
134	9 December 2015	978-4-537-13374-5
135	9 February 2016	978-4-537-13401-8
136	9 April 2016	978-4-537-13426-1
137	9 June 2016	978-4-537-13451-3
138	8 August 2016	978-4-537-13469-8
139	8 October 2016	978-4-537-13490-2
140	10 December 2016	978-4-537-13517-6
141	9 March 2017	978-4-537-13555-8
142	10 May 2017	978-4-537-13579-4
143	10 July 2017	978-4-537-13601-2
144	7 September 2017	978-4-537-13621-0
145	9 November 2017	978-4-537-13649-4
146	9 January 2018	978-4-537-13676-0
147	9 March 2018	978-4-53-713706-4
148	9 July 2018	978-4-537-13769-9
149	7 September 2018	978-4-537-13804-7
150	9 November 2018	978-4-537-13837-5
151	9 January 2019	978-4-537-13856-6
152	9 March 2019	978-4-537-13892-4
153	8 June 2019	978-4-537-13932-7
154	9 September 2019	978-4-537-13975-4
155	9 December 2019	978-4-537-14175-7
156	10 February 2020	978-4-537-14201-3
157	9 May 2020	978-4-537-14239-6
158	18 July 2020	978-4-537-14262-4
159	17 October 2020	978-4-537-14294-5
160	9 February 2021	978-4-537-14338-6
161	8 May 2021	978-4-537-14370-6
162	18 August 2021	978-4-537-14398-0
163	18 October 2021	978-4-537-14420-8
164	9 December 2021	978-4-537-14438-3
165	19 February 2022	978-4-537-14464-2
166	9 May 2022	978-4-537-14500-7
167	7 July 2022	978-4-537-14524-3
168	9 November 2022	978-4-537-14566-3
169	9 February 2023	978-4-537-14605-9
170	7 April 2023	978-4-537-14630-1
171	18 May 2023	978-4-537-14643-1
172	8 August 2023	978-4-537-14679-0
173	10 October 2023	978-4-537-14702-5
174	7 December 2023	978-4-537-14735-3
175	8 February 2024	978-4-537-14765-0
176	8 April 2024	978-4-537-14802-2
177	7 June 2024	978-4-537-14833-6
178	7 August 2024	978-4-537-14864-0
179	8 October 2024	978-4-537-14905-0
180	9 December 2024	978-4-537-14934-0
181	7 February 2025	978-4-537-14958-6
182	9 April 2025	978-4-537-17215-7
183	9 June 2025	978-4-537-17248-5
184	7 August 2025	978-4-537-17274-4
185	9 October 2025	978-4-537-17304-8
186	26 December 2025	978-4-537-17347-5
187	9 February 2026	978-4-537-17361-1
188	9 April 2026	978-4-537-17374-1

=== Minami no Teiō: Young-hen ===
A prequel manga, titled Minami no Teiō: Young-hen (ミナミの帝王 ヤング編, Minami no Teiō Yangu-hen) (and later Minami no Teiō: Young-hen – Riken Kūkō (ミナミの帝王 ヤング編 利権空港, Minami no Teiō Yangu-hen Riken Kūkō)), was published from 2006 to 2013, and nine volumes were released from 30 November 2006 to 29 June 2013.

No.	Release date	ISBN
1	9 November 2006	978-4-537-10550-6
2	8 December 2006	978-4-537-10561-2
3	9 March 2007	978-4-537-10613-8
4	10 May 2007	978-4-537-10641-1
5	19 November 2007	978-4-537-10777-7
6	19 December 2007	978-4-537-10778-4

=== Minami no Teiō: Young-hen – Riken Kūkō ===
No.	Release date	ISBN
1	18 July 2009	978-4-537-10987-0
2	8 August 2011	978-4-537-12774-4
3	29 June 2013	978-4-537-13054-6

=== Films ===
The first original video film was released on 26 June 1992. The first theatrical film was released on 26 June 1993.

=== Incomplete list ===
- The King of Minami Returns: Scholarship and Oreore Fraud (2016)
- The King of Minami The Movie (2017)
- The King of Minami Returns: The Price of a Life (2017)
- The King of Minami Returns: Light and Shadow (2017)

== Reception ==
By January 2026, the manga had over 60 million copies in circulation.

== See also ==
- List of best-selling manga
