= Monkey Peak =

Japanese manga series

- First tankōbon volume cover

モンキーピーク (Monkīpīku)
- Genre: Horror
- Manga
- Written by: Kōji Shinasaka
- Illustrated by: Akihiro Kumeta
- Published by: Nihon Bungeisha
- English publisher: NA: Antarctic Press
- Imprint: Nichibun Comics
- Magazine: Weekly Manga Goraku
- Original run: September 2, 2016 – August 23, 2019
- Volumes: 12
- Original net animation
- Studio: Tomovies
- Released: October 26, 2018 – April 1, 2019
- Runtime: 2 minutes
- Episodes: 20
- Manga

The Rock
- Written by: Kōji Shinasaka
- Illustrated by: Akihiro Kumeta
- Published by: Nihon Bungeisha
- Imprint: Nichibun Comics
- Magazine: Weekly Manga Goraku
- Original run: September 2, 2019 – September 24, 2021
- Volumes: 9

Monkey Peak (モンキーピーク, Monkīpīku) is a Japanese manga series written by Kōji Shinasaka and illustrated by Akihiro Kumeta. It was serialized in Nihon Bungeisha's seinen manga magazine Weekly Manga Goraku from September 2016 to August 2019. An original net animation adaptation was streamed on Production I.G's Anime Beans app between October 2018 and April 2019.

== Synopsis ==
The story focuses on a group of pharmaceutical company employees who go on a mountain hike together and face tragedy at the hands of mysterious apes when they reach the summit.

== Media ==
=== Manga ===
Written by Kōji Shinasaka and illustrated by Akihiro Kumeta, Monkey Peak was serialized in Nihon Bungeisha's seinen manga magazine Weekly Manga Goraku from September 2, 2016, to August 23, 2019. The series' chapters were collected into twelve tankōbon volumes from February 9, 2017, to October 18, 2019.

On May 14, 2024, Antarctic Press launched a Kickstarter campaign to release a hardcover English version of the first volume with a goal of $1,000. It reached its goal on the first day.

A sequel manga titled Monkey Peak: The Rock was serialized in the same magazine from November 1, 2019, to September 24, 2021. The sequel's chapters were collected into nine tankōbon volumes from March 18, 2020, to January 19, 2022.

==== Volumes ====
No.	Release date	ISBN
1	February 9, 2017	978-4-53-713546-6
2	May 10, 2017	978-4-53-713582-4
3	August 9, 2017	978-4-53-713612-8
4	November 9, 2017	978-4-53-713650-0
5	February 9, 2018	978-4-53-713692-0
6	April 28, 2018	978-4-53-713732-3
7	July 27, 2018	978-4-53-713770-5
8	November 9, 2018	978-4-53-713838-2
9	February 9, 2019	978-4-53-713885-6
10	May 29, 2019	978-4-53-713922-8
11	August 8, 2019	978-4-53-713958-7
12	October 18, 2019	978-4-53-713993-8

==== Monkey Peak: The Rock ====
No.	Release date	ISBN
1	March 18, 2020	978-4-53-714216-7
2	June 19, 2020	978-4-53-714255-6
3	September 17, 2020	978-4-53-714281-5
4	December 19, 2020	978-4-53-714320-1
5	March 18, 2021	978-4-53-714349-2
6	June 17, 2021	978-4-53-714381-2
7	September 17, 2021	978-4-53-714407-9
8	December 18, 2021	978-4-53-714441-3
9	January 19, 2022	978-4-53-714452-9

=== Anime ===
A 20-episode original net animation adaptation produced by Tomovies was streamed on Production I.G's Anime Beans app on October 26, 2018, to April 1, 2019.

== Reception ==
The series as a whole has over 2 million copies in circulation.

== See also ==
- Tōhai, another manga series with the same writer
