= Weekly Manga Goraku =

Japanese weekly manga magazine

Weekly Manga Goraku 週刊漫画ゴラク
- Cover of the June 17, 2005, issue
- Categories: Seinen manga
- Frequency: Weekly
- First issue: 1968
- Company: Nihon Bungeisha
- Country: Japan
- Based in: Tokyo
- Language: Japanese
- Website: gorakuweb.com

Weekly Manga Goraku (週刊漫画ゴラク, Shūkan Manga Goraku) is a Japanese weekly manga magazine published since 1968, by Nihon Bungeisha. The magazine is published every Friday.

== Serialized works ==
Listed alphabetically by title.

- 69 Denashi (Yasuhito Yamamoto)
- Ad Boy (Makoto Niwano)
- Aisu Otoko - Iceman (Mio Murao)
- Akane Toyori (Shun Sekiguchi)
- Angel: the women whom delivery host Kosuke Atami healed (U-Jin)
- Angel: the women whom delivery host Kosuke Atami healed season 2 (U-Jin)
- Ari Jigoku (Toshiyuki Itakura)
- Asakusabito (Masaharu Nabeshima)
- Baddoman - Akutarou (Yukio Tamai)
- Bakumeshi! (Shigeru Tsuchiyama)
- Bonkura (Tsuru Moriyama)
- Cement Boy (Shigeru Okamura)
- Chloe no Ryuugi (Daisuke Imai)
- Dai-46-dai: Natsume Kirou Emon - Kouryuu no Mimi Hatsugenhen (Masaharu Nabeshima, Arimasa Oosawa)
- Danjiru Matsuri (Sayumi Sakuragi)
- Dark (Keigo Izuki, Seisaku Kanou)
- Datsugoku Doctor Inochiya Enma (Jun Tomizawa)
- Densha Doori Icchoume (Kunihiko Ikeda)
- Dirty (Dai Tennouji)
- Dogenzaka Alice (Shigeyuki Iwashita)
- Dogesen (Keisuke Itagaki, Rin Kasahara)
- Dokaban Shachou (Atsushi Jinbo)
- Dokacook (Yasuhiro Watanabe)
- Dororo to Enma-kun (Go Nagai)
- Double - Haitoku no Rinjin (Yasuyuki Kunitomo)
- Dr. Ashura (Ryou Koshino)
- Edomae no Shun (Mori Tsukumo, Terushi Satou)
- Fechi no Ana (Masakazu Yamaguchi)
- First Lady (Masaru Miyazaki, Yoshihide Fujiwara)
- Gannibal (Masaaki Ninomiya)
- Gedoubou (Shinji Hiramatsu)
- Gedoubou & Murder License Kiba (Shinji Hiramatsu)
- Gekiai (Mia Amiya)
- Gekiman! (Go Nagai)
- Gekiman! - Mazinger Z Hen (Go Nagai)
- Gekiman! Cutie Honey Hen (Go Nagai)
- Gift ± (Yuka Nagate)
- Ginga Legend Weed (Yoshihiro Takahashi)
- Ginga Legend Weed: Orion (Yoshihiro Takahashi)
- Ginga: The Last Wars (Yoshihiro Takahashi)
- Ginga Densetsu Noah (Yoshihiro Takahashi)
- Ginga Shōnen Densetsu Dog Days (Yoshihiro Takahashi)
- Ginga Densetsu: Requiem (Yoshihiro Takahashi) (ongoing)
- Girls Be... (Hiroyuki Tamakoshi)
- Goku!! Otokojuku (Akira Miyashita)
- Gokurakugo (Shinji Hiramatsu, Uni Yasue)
- Gokutsuma Keiji (Issaku Wake, Masahito Kagawa)
- Gottsuan Desu (Kenji Okamura)
- Hadaka no Ringo (Sayaka Yamazaki)
- Hakkenshi (Kenji Okamura, Bakin Takazawa)
- Hakuryuu (Dai Tennoji, Michio Watanabe)
- Hakuryuu Hadou (Dai Tennoji, Michio Watanabe)
- Hakuryuu Legend (Dai Tennoji, Michio Watanabe)
- Haru no Sakana (Yuuichirou Sueda, Kei Honjou)
- Hi no Tori (Fumiyo Kouno)
- Higher Ground (Funwari)
- Hokori (Yoichi Takahashi)
- Honesty (Shou Kitagawa)
- Horus no Te (Tatsuya Seki)
- Jadou (Shigeru Tsuchiyama)
- Jikoman (Yukio Tamai)
- Jinnai Ryuujuujutsu Rurouden Majima, Bazeru!! (Makoto Niwano)
- Kabuki no Fudou (Subaru Mizuki, Michinori Okitani)
- Kaden no Den-san (Atsushi Jinbo)
- Kurokan (Norifusa Mita)
- Kurokōchi (Richard Woo and Koji Kono)
- Heisei Harenchi Gakuen (Go Nagai)
- Minami no Teiō (Dai Tennōji and Rikiya Gō)
- Monkey Peak (Kōji Shinasaka and Akihiro Kumeta)
- Reverse Edge: Ōkawabata Tanteisha (Garon Tsuchiya and Akio Tanaka)
- Shiritsu Kiwamemichi Kōkō 2011 (Akira Miyashita)
- Satsuma Gishiden (Hiroshi Hirata)
- Violence Jack (Go Nagai)
