= Emi Uwagawa =

Japanese voice actress (born December 30)

- 宇和川恵美
- Born: December 30; Kobe, Hyōgo Prefecture, Japan
- Occupations: Voice actress; narrator
- Years active: 1993–present
- Agent: Aoni Production

Emi Uwagawa (宇和川恵美, Uwagawa Emi; born December 30) is a Japanese voice actress and narrator from Kobe, Hyōgo Prefecture, Japan affiliated with Aoni Production. She is best known for her role as Sun Shang Xiang in the Dynasty Warriors and Warriors Orochi series.

== Filmography ==
=== Television animation ===
- Gegege no Kitaro as Azuki-Babaa (second voice)
- Haré+Guu (TV) as Adi
- Jigoku Sensei Nube as Mini Yuurei, Shizuka Kikuchi
- Kindaichi Shōnen no Jikenbo as Fujiko Akamine (Ep. 95-99)
- One Piece as Rika
- Outlaw Star as Clerk
- Rumbling Hearts as Miki
- Sailor Moon Sailor Stars as Airport Announcer (Ep. 173); Ami's Friend (ep 170); Announcer (Ep. 175,180,189); Big Sister (ep 186); Bodyguard (ep 187); Child (ep 177); Girl (Ep. 169,192); Hostess on Train (ep 183); Mirror Paredri (ep 168); Nurse (ep 185); Reporter (ep 195); Schoolgirl (Ep. 176); Secretary (Ep. 174,179,181); Stewardess (Ep. 188); Tulip (Ep. 171)
- Sailor Moon SuperS as Announcer (Ep. 147); Child (Ep. 144); Child (Ep. 153); Child A (ep 158); Freaks (ep 162); Girl B (Ep. 149); Samurai-Onna (Ep. 166)
- Sentimental Journey as Noriko (Ep. 4)
- Yu-Gi-Oh! as Kageyama Sister B (Ep. 15), Woman Announcer (Ep. 22)

=== Theatrical animation ===
- Crayon Shin-chan: Arashi wo Yobu Mouretsu! Otona Teikoku no Gyakushuu as Reception woman
- Yu-Gi-Oh! as Shun
- Jigoku Sensei Nube: Kyoufu no Natsu Yasumi! Asashi no Uni no Gensetsu as Shizuka
- Sailor Moon SuperS: The Movie as Bonbon Babies
- Sailor Moon SuperS: Plus - Ami's First Love as Girl

=== Original video animation (OVA) ===
- Jungle Wa Itsumo Hale Nochi Guu Deluxe as Adi

=== Drama CD ===
- School Days: Original Drama CD Vol. 1 as Itaru Itou

=== Tokusatsu ===
- Mirai Sentai Timeranger as Sniper Reihou (ep 15)

=== Video game roles ===
- Atwight Eks in "Tales of Destiny 2" (Japanese)
- Atwight Eks in "Tales of Destiny PS2" (Japanese)
- Itaru Itou in "School Days" (as Kagetsu Nanba)
- Itaru Itou in "Summer Days"/"Shiny Days" (as Kagetsu Nanba)
- Miyuki in "Xenosaga" (Japanese)
- Sun Shang Xiang in "Dynasty Warriors 3" (Japanese)
- Sun Shang Xiang in "Dynasty Warriors 4" (Japanese)
- Kururu (Girl Type) in "Kemono Friends" (Japanese)
