= Tōhai =

Japanese manga series

- First tankōbon volume cover

凍牌
- Genre: Sports (mahjong), suspense
- Manga
- Written by: Kōji Shinasaka
- Published by: Akita Shoten
- Imprint: Young Champion Comics
- Magazine: Young Champion
- Original run: June 27, 2006 – April 12, 2011
- Volumes: 12
- Manga

Tōhai: Hitobashira-hen
- Written by: Kōji Shinasaka
- Published by: Akita Shoten
- Imprint: Young Champion Comics
- Magazine: Young Champion
- Original run: May 10, 2011 – May 23, 2017
- Volumes: 16
- Live-action film
- Directed by: Yūichi Onuma
- Written by: Yūichi Onuma
- Music by: Taku Unami
- Studio: KZ Entertainment
- Released: May 18, 2013
- Manga

Tōhai: Minagoroshi-hen
- Written by: Kōji Shinasaka
- Published by: Akita Shoten
- Imprint: Young Champion Comics
- Magazine: Young Champion
- Original run: September 26, 2017 – June 8, 2021
- Volumes: 10
- Manga

Tōhai: Cold Girl
- Written by: Kōji Shinasaka
- Published by: Akita Shoten
- Imprint: Young Champion Comics
- Magazine: Young Champion
- Original run: September 28, 2021 – present
- Volumes: 13
- Anime television series
- Directed by: Jun Hatori
- Written by: Mariko Kunisawa
- Music by: Yūsuke Shirato; Yuki Kishida
- Studio: East Fish Studio
- Original network: MBS, TBS, BS-TBS, RKB, HBC
- Original run: October 5, 2024 – April 5, 2025
- Episodes: 25

Tōhai (凍牌) is a Japanese manga series written and illustrated by Kōji Shinasaka. It was serialized in Akita Shoten's seinen manga magazine Young Champion from June 2006 to April 2011. A sequel manga, Tōhai: Hitobashira-hen, was serialized in Young Champion from May 2011 to May 2017. A third series, Tōhai: Minagoroshi-hen, was serialized in Young Champion from September 2017 to June 2021. A fourth series, Tōhai: Cold Girl, has been serialized in Young Champion since September 2021.

A live-action film adaptation premiered in Japan in May 2013, and an anime television series adaptation produced by East Fish Studio aired from October 2024 to April 2025.

== Plot ==
Money, women, organs. Kei, a high school boy, frequents the underground mahjong parlor teeming with desires, earning him the moniker 'K of the ICE' in the underworld due to his cold-hearted strategy and stylish gameplay. Rumors also circulate that he keeps a girl at his home.

== Characters ==
Kei (ケイ)
Voiced by: Kohsuke Tanabe
Dōjima (堂嶋)
Voiced by: Shunsuke Takeuchi
Amina (アミナ)
Voiced by: Fairouz Ai
Noriyuki Takatsu (高津 則之, Takatsu Noriyuki)
Voiced by: Tsuyoshi Koyama
Yū Katsuragi (桂木 優, Katsuragi Yū)
Voiced by: Chinatsu Akasaki
Hideharu Seki (関 ひではる, Seki Hideharu)
Voiced by: Toshihiko Seki
Hatakeyama (畑山)
Voiced by: Takehito Koyasu
Ai (アイ)
Voiced by: Yoko Hikasa

== Media ==
=== Manga ===
Written and illustrated by Kōji Shinasaka, Tōhai was serialized in Akita Shoten's seinen manga magazine Young Champion from June 27, 2006, to April 12, 2011, with its chapters collected into twelve tankōbon volumes.

A sequel manga, titled Tōhai: Hitobashira-hen, was serialized in the same magazine from May 10, 2011, to May 23, 2017, and was collected into sixteen volumes.

A third series, titled Tōhai: Minagoroshi-hen, was serialized in the same magazine from September 26, 2017, to June 8, 2021, and was collected into ten volumes.

A fourth series, titled Tōhai: Cold Girl, began serialization in the same magazine on September 28, 2021, and has been collected into thirteen volumes as of October 2026.

==== Tōhai ====
No.	Release date	ISBN
1	December 20, 2006	978-4-253-14778-1
2	May 18, 2007	978-4-253-14779-8
3	October 19, 2007	978-4-253-14780-4
4	April 18, 2008	978-4-253-14781-1
5	September 19, 2008	978-4-253-14782-8
6	January 20, 2009	978-4-253-14783-5
7	June 19, 2009	978-4-253-14802-3
8	October 20, 2009	978-4-253-14803-0
9	February 19, 2010	978-4-253-14804-7
10	July 20, 2010	978-4-253-14805-4
11	January 20, 2011	978-4-253-14806-1
12	June 20, 2011	978-4-253-14840-5

==== Tōhai: Hitobashira-hen ====
No.	Release date	ISBN
1	October 20, 2011	978-4-253-14943-3
2	March 19, 2012	978-4-253-14944-0
3	August 20, 2012	978-4-253-14945-7
4	January 18, 2013	978-4-253-14946-4
5	June 20, 2013	978-4-253-14947-1
6	November 20, 2013	978-4-253-14948-8
7	March 20, 2014	978-4-253-14949-5
8	July 18, 2014	978-4-253-14950-1
9	December 19, 2014	978-4-253-15216-7
10	May 20, 2015	978-4-253-15217-4
11	August 20, 2015	978-4-253-15218-1
12	January 20, 2016	978-4-253-15219-8
13	June 20, 2016	978-4-253-15220-4
14	November 18, 2016	978-4-253-15221-1
15	March 17, 2017	978-4-253-15222-8
16	July 20, 2017	978-4-253-15223-5

==== Tōhai: Minagoroshi-hen ====
No.	Release date	ISBN
1	April 20, 2018	978-4-253-14131-4
2	September 20, 2018	978-4-253-14132-1
3	January 18, 2019	978-4-253-14133-8
4	June 20, 2019	978-4-253-14134-5
5	October 18, 2019	978-4-253-14135-2
6	March 19, 2020	978-4-253-14136-9
7	July 20, 2020	978-4-253-14137-6
8	December 18, 2020	978-4-253-14138-3
9	May 20, 2021	978-4-253-14139-0
10	August 19, 2021	978-4-253-14140-6

==== Tōhai: Cold Girl ====
No.	Release date	ISBN
1	March 17, 2022	978-4-253-30701-7
2	July 20, 2022	978-4-253-30702-4
3	November 18, 2022	978-4-253-30703-1
4	April 20, 2023	978-4-253-30704-8
5	September 20, 2023	978-4-253-30705-5
6	January 18, 2024	978-4-253-30706-2
7	June 19, 2024	978-4-253-30707-9
8	October 18, 2024	978-4-253-30708-6
9	March 18, 2025	978-4-253-30709-3
10	July 18, 2025	978-4-253-30710-9
11	December 19, 2025	978-4-253-00946-1
12	May 20, 2026	978-4-253-01366-6
13	October 20, 2026	978-4-253-01973-6

=== Live-action film ===
A live-action film adaptation directed and written by Yūichi Onuma premiered in Japanese theaters on May 18, 2013. The film starred Gōki Maeda, Hidekazu Ichinose, and Yasukaze Motomiya.

=== Anime ===
An anime television series adaptation was announced on January 11, 2024. It is produced by East Fish Studio and directed by Jun Hatori, with Mariko Kunisawa overseeing series scripts, Sayaka Anesaki designing the characters, and Yūsuke Shirato and Yuki Kishida composing the music. The series aired from October 5, 2024, to April 5, 2025, on the Animeism programming block on MBS, TBS, and BS-TBS. (Note: MBS and TBS listed the series premiere on October 4, 2024, at 26:23, which is effectively October 5 at 2:23 a.m. JST.) The opening theme song is "Gambling Hall" (ギャンブリングホール), performed by Masayoshi Ōishi, while the first ending theme song is "Plastic Showcase" (プラスティック・ショーケース) performed by Taiyo to Odore, Tsukiyo ni Utae, and the second ending theme song is "Tumbling Dice", performed by Enako and Kayano Kusano.

As of January 29, 2025, the anime has been released on Pony Canyon's YouTube channel.

==== Episodes ====
No.	Title	Directed by (Note: Production staff information is taken from the ending credits of each episode.)	Written by	Storyboard by	Original release date
1	"The Boy"; Transliteration: "Shōnen" (Japanese: 少年)	Yoshito Hata	Mariko Kunizawa	Jun Hatori	October 5, 2024
2	"The Girl"; Transliteration: "Shōjo" (Japanese: 少女)	Ying Xing Mao	Mariko Kunizawa	Jun Hatori	October 12, 2024
3	"Dojima"; Transliteration: "Dōjima" (Japanese: 堂嶋)	Satoshi Nakagawa	Mariko Kunizawa	Takashi Iida	October 19, 2024
4	"Hatakeyama"; Transliteration: "Hatakeyama" (Japanese: 畑山)	Shiggeki Awai	Miya Asakawa	Moe Aratani, Yuri Isowa	October 26, 2024
5	"Pinky Toe"; Transliteration: "Koyubi" (Japanese: 小指)	Daiki Nishimura	Koji Miura	Takashi Iida	November 2, 2024
6	"The Decision"; Transliteration: "Sentaku" (Japanese: 選択)	Shigeki Awai, Misato Aoyama	Mariko Kunizawa	Tomoaki Takahashi	November 9, 2024
7	"The Mastermind"; Transliteration: "Kuromaku" (Japanese: 黒幕)	Ying Xing Mao	Koji Miura	Takashi Iida	November 16, 2024
8	"Deadly Resolve"; Transliteration: "Kesshi" (Japanese: 決死)	Masahito Otani	Miya Asakawa	Kentaro Iino	November 23, 2024
9	"Last Round"; Transliteration: "Shūkyoku" (Japanese: 終局)	Satoshi Nakagawa	Mariko Kunizawa	Minoru Ohara	November 30, 2024
10	"Sharp Eyes"; Transliteration: "Keigan" (Japanese: 慧眼)	Shigeki Awai	Koji Miura	Moe Aratani	December 7, 2024
11	"Blind Demon"; Transliteration: "Anki" (Japanese: 暗鬼)	Misato Aoyama	Miya Asakawa	Takashi Iida	December 14, 2024
12	"Your Worth"; Transliteration: "Kachi" (Japanese: 価値)	Yoko Morishita	Koji Miura	Tomoaki Takahashi	December 21, 2024
13	"The Tournament"; Transliteration: "Taikai" (Japanese: 大会)	Ying Xing Mao	Mariko Kunizawa	Moe Aratani	January 11, 2024
14	"Fingertips"; Transliteration: "Yubisaki" (Japanese: 指先)	Shigeki Awai	Koji Miura	Takashi Iida	January 18, 2024
15	"The Queen"; Transliteration: "Joō" (Japanese: 女王)	Masahito Otani	Miya Asakawa	Tomoaki Takahashi	January 25, 2025
16	"The Secret"; Transliteration: "Himitsu" (Japanese: 秘密)	Shigeki Awai	Takumi Watanabe	Minoru Ohara	February 1, 2025
17	"Miscalculation"; Transliteration: "Gosan" (Japanese: 誤算)	Ying Xing Mao	Mariko Kunizawa	Takashi Iida	February 8, 2025
18	"Burning the Boats"; Transliteration: "Haisui" (Japanese: 背水)	Misato Aoyama	Koji Miura	Tomoaki Takahashi	February 15, 2025
19	"A Godlike Feat"; Transliteration: "Kamiwaza" (Japanese: 神業)	Masahito Otani	Mariko Kunizawa	Takashi Iida	February 22, 2025
20	"The Ryūō"; Transliteration: "Ryūō" (Japanese: 竜凰)	Daiki Nishimura	Miya Asakawa	Takashi Iida	March 1, 2025
21	"The Ice Man"; Transliteration: "Kōri no Otoko" (Japanese: 氷の男)	Ken Kiyota	Mariko Kunizawa	Tomoaki Takahashi	March 8, 2025
22	"Two Choices"; Transliteration: "Futatsu ni Hitotsu" (Japanese: 二つに一つ)	Ying Xing Mao	Takumi Watanabe	Takashi Iida	March 15, 2025
23	"The House of Despair"; Transliteration: "Zetsubō no Yakata" (Japanese: 絶望の館)	Ken Kiyota	Koji Miura	Tomoaki Takahashi	March 22, 2025
24	"The Winner"; Transliteration: "Saigo no Shōsha" (Japanese: 最後の勝者)	Ying Xing Mao	Miya Asakawa	Minoru Ohara	March 29, 2025
25	"Gambling Chips"; Transliteration: "Hitobashira" (Japanese: 人柱)	Daiki Nishimura	Mariko Kunizawa	Takashi Iida	April 5, 2025

== See also ==
- Monkey Peak, another manga series by the same author
