= Private Psycho Lesson =

Original video animation

- Cover art from the DVD release of Private Psycho Lesson

個人授業 (Kojin Jugyo)
- Genre: Comedy, Drama, Hentai
- Original video animation
- Directed by: Tetsurō Amino
- Written by: Ryusei
- Studio: J.C. Staff; Blue Mantis; Tokuma Japan
- Licensed by: NA: Anime HotShots, a label of Central Park Media defunct
- Released: September 27, 1996 – November 1, 1996
- Runtime: 30 minutes per episode
- Episodes: 2

Private Psycho Lesson (個人授業, Kojin Jugyō) is a hentai anime created by U-Jin in 1996. It contains two episodes, both stories showcase Dr. Sara Iijima, a beautiful and buxom psychiatrist and her unique therapeutic abilities, as well as the adventures she gets into. There's also one volume of manga.

Green Bunny re-released the anime on January 25, 2003.

== Synopsis ==
Even as a young girl, Sara Iijima was a large-breasted woman. Because of this, she had felt self-conscious about herself... especially with men who were constantly leering at her. This only intensified when she was attacked by a rapist with a breast fetish. Although she escaped unharmed, this only made worse her insecurities. It was only because of the intervention of Dr. Chang that she was able to feel good about herself. Out of gratitude, Sara became Dr. Chang's protege in the method of psychic feedback, the method which was used to cure her of her insecurities.

However, Dr. Sara's method of therapy is vastly different from what Dr. Chang had used. By swinging her huge breasts in a circle, she is able to induce a hypnotic trance in her patients, after which she is able to learn what is bothering the patient and offer the proper solution for them. There is a risk of using this: Sara is often vulnerable to the sexual appetites of her patients and she must maintain control of the situation in order to do so.

Sara is not alone, though. She is often accompanied by her companion Tamine, a young man who cannot seem to get a woman, no matter how hard he tries to. But Tamine is devoted to Sara (mostly because of her huge breasts, which he is able to cop a feel whenever the chance arises), and aids her in helping others in need.

== Episodes ==
=== Episode One ===
The first episode, entitled "Yuri", features Sara investigating a schoolgirl who works as a prostitute and also has murderous tendencies.

Sara had been hired the local social worker services to investigate Yuri Saito, a young student at a university who was working as a prostitute after school. During her investigation at a shopping center, she had found out that Yuri had shredded a bra in a department store with a box cutter in a fit of anger. Later, when she disguised herself as a customer, she lost control of the situation and was seduced by Yuri in which she sucked on her Sara's left breast, this then would follow up by Yuri taking off Sara's panties in which Yuri would proceeded to perform cunnilingus on Sara. In the throes of passion, Sara nearly didn't escape with her life when Yuri suddenly attacked her with the same knife she used earlier and threatened to slash her huge breasts. She had almost thrown-away her career when Dr. Chang had shown up at her apartment and persuaded her to continue.

When Sara met Yuri again, she was able to turn the tables on her by having sex with Yuri, then was able to hypnotize her. She then found out that Yuri had blamed herself for her mother's death when she was born and soon learns that her mother died from a terminal illness, as Yuri was growing up she didn't receive any affection from her father who was so devastated since her mother's death. Sara has successfully convinced Yuri that she was not responsible and not to blame herself as she comforts her, the next day on her way to school Yuri tosses the pager-(that she had received from her boss) into a river. Sara erased the session from Yuri's mind and went after the true culprit... the university's dean, who was Yuri's pimp and 'persuaded' him to get out of the business.

=== Episode Two ===
In the second episode, entitled "Erika", Sara confronts fellow friend and psychotherapist Erika who is attempting to brainwash the school.

Erika claimed to have improved upon Dr. Chang's psychic feedback technique. However, Alex, one of the patients that she had treated back in America later raped her, then committed suicide as a result. Because of this, Erika believed that the extent to most people couldn't be trusted; causing her to think that hypnotizing techniques would "help" other people like Alex. She then used a modified version of her technique to brainwash the male members of the university to sexually assault Sara and then the female members to rape and seduce Tamine; Sara then reveals that Erika was so traumatized by Alex's death that she became terrified of building trusting relationships with other patients on a one-to-one basis.

It required Sara (with a little help from Tamine, who had manipulated her breasts to induce hypnosis) to overcome Erika and her army of brainwashed students to the bottom of the problem. After Sara hypnotized Erika, we soon learn that Alex did not commit suicide; when Alex was walking by himself he encountered his delinquent friends-(hinting that Alex was a former gang member) and they threatened to kill him if he decided to quit the gang then was forced by his friends to rape Erika to prove his loyalty to them. However they caught him attempting to run away which caused the gang members to kill Alex-(by shooting him in the head) and make the scene look like a suicide; the reason Alex wanted to quit the gang was because he wanted to start over and make a change in his life. Suddenly, Alex's spirit appears and happily thanks Erika for everything that she done for him, even explaining that this was the first time he's ever felt truly happy; when Erika wakes up Sara reminds her that it's not too late to start over and that she can start fresh again. After de-programming the students, Erika decides to go back to America. The episode ends with Sara pointing to the audience and saying her catchphrase "The lesson is over".

=== Characters ===
Sara Iijima (飯島 サラ, Iijima Sara)
- Voiced by: Hirori Mori (Japanese); Candi Washington (English)
Sara is the main protagonist of Kojin Jugyou.

Yuri Saito (斎藤 ゆり, Saito Yuri)
- Voiced by: Kotomi Ryuguden (Japanese); Syndi Snackwell (English)
Yuri is a female college student at St. Sakuragaoka University.

Erika Shimada (島田 エリカ, Shimada Erika)
- Voiced by: Rumi Goto

Tamine (タミね)
- Voiced by: Sho Mineta (Japanese); Chris Sands (English)
Tamine is Sara's companion, acquaintance, and best friend.

Doctor Chang (チャン博士, Chang-sensei)
- Voiced by: Touzainanboku (Japanese); Jimmy Zoppi (English)

Mr. Saito (斉藤さん, Saito-san)
- Voiced by: Torakichi Ie (Japanese); Chris Sands (English)

== Reception ==
The Anime Encyclopedia′ authors state that Private Psycho Lesson "is a variant on the elder erotic initiatress [which is] also seen in Rei Rei", but find the script's treatment of rape "particularly offensive". They also note that U-Jin "knows what his audience wants, but he's capable of delivering it more cleverly".
