= Vixens (manga) =

Manga by U-Jin

ヴィジョナリイ (Vijonarī)
- Genre: Comedy, Hentai
- Manga
- Written by: U-Jin
- Published by: Cybele Publishing
- Imprint: Cybele Comics
- Original run: June 1994 – March 1995
- Volumes: 10
- Original video animation

Visionary
- Directed by: Teruo Kigure
- Written by: Ryo Saga
- Music by: Masahiko Kikuchi
- Studio: Knack Productions
- Licensed by: NA: Anime 18
- Released: August 25, 1995 – April 21, 1996
- Episodes: 3

Vixens, known in Japan as Visionary (ヴィジョナリイ, Vijonarī), is a hentai manga by U-Jin published by Cybele publishing in June 1994, the OVA series was released on August 25, 1995, to April 21, 1996, It contains three episodes and contains the use of BDSM and Omorashi.

== Episodes ==
Merged number	Merged title	Original number	Original title	Plot
1	Anata no Yume Kanaemasu (あなたの夢かなえます)	1	SM Snake (SM スネーク)	A nerd guy named Yujita summons a sexy android named Doreimon from the 22nd century. Using her futuristic powers and a strange creature called SM Snake, she'll try to help him score his dream girl.
1	Anata no Yume Kanaemasu (あなたの夢かなえます)	2	Miracle Alien (ミラクル•エイリアン)	Yujita tries to lose his virginity to a call girl. After she mocks him about his manhood size he runs away and asks Doreimon for help. She calls Miracle Alien who helps guys with a small penis.
2	Joshikō Nama wa Chō Etchi (女子校生は超エッチ)	3	Skydiving in Love (愛のスカイダイビング, Ai no Skydiving)	Koban and Sameo have a very strange arrangement. Koban gets Sameo's leftovers, but he also pays for Sameo's dates! One day, Koban rescues a pretty girl named Shiori from an attacker in the park. Koban immediately falls for Shiori, but is too shy to say anything. Sameo then proceeds to set up Koban and Shiori... on a skydiving date!
2	Joshikō Nama wa Chō Etchi (女子校生は超エッチ)	4	New Century Queen (ニユー•センチユリークイーン)	Mai Inoue desperately wants to become a showbiz personality, and she's ready to do just about anything to make her dream come true. Mai decides to join the upcoming beauty pageant "New Century Queen", where claiming the title may be her ticket to fame. To improve her chances, Mai decides to get acquainted with the handsome producer Akagi. But Akagi has plans of his own...
3	(same as original)	5	The Vampire Tradition (美少女ヴァンパイア伝説, Bishōjo Vampire Densetsu)	Pretty girls are disappearing from St. Stoker University, and the student council president thinks vampires are behind it! When her friends are kidnapped, Kanna - a 19-year-old transfer student from Europe - decides to take action.
