= Miyuki Kojima =

Japanese actress and singer (born 1952)

Pai Pai Miyuki
- パイパイ 美ゆき
- Born: 23 March 1952 (age 73); Bunkyō, Tokyo, Japan
- Other names: Miyuki Kojima (former stage name)
- Occupations: Actress; singer
- Years active: 1967–
- Notable work: Harenchi Gakuen series
- Television: Harenchi Gakuen; Kita no Kuni kara; Maido osawagaseshimasu
- Height: 154 cm (5 ft 1 in)

Pai Pai Miyuki (パイパイ 美ゆき; born 23 March 1952, in Tokyo) is a Japanese actress and singer. Until 1970, she used the stage name Miyuki Kojima (児島 みゆき, Kojima Miyuki). She is represented with Kagawa Office. She graduated from Musashino-shi Daiichi Elementary School, Musashino Municipal First Junior High School, and Nakano Fumizono High School (now Otsuma Nakano High School).

== Biography ==
At the age of 14, she was chosen as the chorus group (Young Fresh) and was singing such as "Masked Ninja Red Shadow" and "Hyokkori Hyoutan Island". In 1968, she appeared as a voice actress in the feature animation film Andersen Monogatari.

In 1970, all four works were produced in the latter part of Nikkatsu (the fourth work was made in 1971) and made a debut in three titles Harenchi Gakuen (also at Yuri Harenchi Gakuen aired on the same year she acted as Mitsuko Yagyuu and she made a spotlight as a "Sexy Talent").

In 2017, she was cast in Ariyoshi's Meeting for Reviewing, and changed her stage name to "Pai Pai Miyuki".

== Filmography ==
Year	Title	Role	Distributor	Ref.
1968	Andersen Monogatari	Child	Toei Animation	
1970	Harenchi Gakuen		Nikkatsu	
1970	Harenchi Gakuen: Karada Kensa no Maki		Nikkatsu	
1970	Harenchi Gakuen: Tackle Kiss no Maki		Nikkatsu	
1970	Ichido wa Ikitai Onna Furo		Nikkatsu	
1975	Kigeki Joshi Gakusei: Hanayakana Chōsen		Shochiku	
1975	Nippon Bijo Monogatari: Onna no Naka no Onna		Shochiku	
1976	Oshare Dai Sakusen		Toho	
1977	Kiri no Hata	Nobuko Kawahara	Toho	
1978	Track Yarō Ichibanhoshi Kita e Kaeru	Kiyoko Sakura (policewoman)	Toei Company	
1978	Hakata-kko Junjō		Shochiku	
1982	Tora-san, the Expert		Shochiku	
1983	"Blow The Night!" Yoru o buttobase		Joy Pack Film	
1985	Anata dake Goodnight: Ā Denjirō		Eagles Company	
1986	Furin		Nikkatsu	
1991	Yoru be naki Otoko no Shigoto-goroshi		Argo Pictures	
1998	Hageshī Kisetsu		KSS	
1999	Nihongokudōshi: Yabō no Gundan		Museum	
2002	Sangeki-kan: Yumeko		Full Media	

=== TV series ===
Run	Title	Role	Network	Production	Notes
1967	Tokubetsu Kidō Sōsa-tai		EX	Toei Company	Episode 292 "Seishun no Tsuioku"
1970	Harenchi Gakuen	Jūbee (Mitsuko Yagyuu)	TX	Nikkatsu	
1971	Wanpaku Bangaichi	Miyuki	TX	Nikkatsu	
1971	Zenigata Heiji	Ochiyo	CX	Toei Company	Episode 283 "Okame to hyottoko"
1971	Onna wa tsurai yo		TBS		
1971–72	Court ni kakeru Seishun	Tomoko Tanaka	CX	Toho	
1972	Kimero! Finish	Keiko Igawa	TBS	Toho	
1972	Kōya no Surōnin		EX	Mifune Pro	1st Series Episode 28 "Dotō: Wakasa-tōge no Kuroi Wana"
1972	Tobidase! Seishun		NTV	Toho	Episode 24 "Kōchō! Anata made ga son'na koto o!?"
1972–73	Ai-chan ga Iku		CX	Daiei TV	
1973	Henshin! Ponpoko-dama		TBS	KHK	
1973	Hashire! Kē 100	Maiko	TBS	C.A.L	Episode 11 "Ohyaku-do mairi no Ishidan Nobore!"
1973–74	Boku wa Ojisan		NTV		
1974	Suiyō Gekijō / Terauchi Kantarōikka	Shungiku	TBS		Episode 7
1975	G-Men '75	Ikuyo	TBS	Toei	Episode 8 "Hadaka no Machi"
1975	G-Men '75	Masako Kitami	TBS	Toei	Episode 24 "Futarigumi Keikan Gang"
1975	Ushiro no Shōmen	Izumi	EX		
1975–76	Jitte Muyō: Kuchō Hori Jiken Jō	Oshin	NTV	Toei	
1976	G-Men '75	Nobuo Fujiwara's sister	TBS	Toei	Episode 36 "Onna Keiji o Osotta Otoko"
1976	G-Men '75	Yukari	TBS	Toei	Episode 53 "Satsujin Drive no Nazo"
16 Aug 1976	Mito Kōmon	Osetsu	TBS	C.A.L	Part 7 Episode 13 "Nakuna Wara Shikko -Akita-"
1976	Nakaseru aitsu		NTV		
1977	G-Men '75		TBS	Toei	Episode 89 "Keishichō Kenjū Tōnan Jiken"
1977	Seishi Yokomizo Series / Akuma ga Kitarite Fue o Fuku	Sumi	MBS	Toho	
1977–78	Paula TV Shōsetsu / Fumiko to hatsu	Miyako	TBS		
1978	G-Men '75	Only woman	TBS	Toei	Episode 181 "Miyanomori Kōban 21-ji no Dekigoto"
1978	Monkey	Rasetsunyo	NTV	International Refurbishment	Episode 24 "Kaen Yama!! Bashō Ōgi no Ai"
1979	G-Men '75	Hiromi Kano	TBS	Toei	Episode 189 "Kikiippatsu! Otoshidama Bakudan Camera"
1979	G-Men '75	Ashiro	TBS	Toei	Episode 216 "Kuchisake Onna Renzoku Satsujin Jiken"
1979	G-Men '75	Miki Imada	TBS	Toei	Episode 231 "Kikiippatsu! Kurumaisu no Onna Keiji"
1979	Sobaya Umekichi Torimonochō	Prostitute	TX	International Refurbishment	Episode 13 "Namidaame Koroshi Jinbetsuchō"
1980	G-Men '75	Hiromi Eguchi	TBS	Toei	Episode 247 "Gozen 0-ji no Hyōryū Shitai"
1980	G-Men '75	Yasuyo Fujikawa	TBS	Toei	Episode 255 "Onna ga Hotta Otoshiana"
1980	G-Men '75	Teruyo Gomi	TBS	Toei	Episode 286 "Skirt Kirisaki Ma"
1980	Tetsudō Kōankan	Motomi	EX	Toei	Episode 35 "Chibikko Dai Sōsa-sen!"
1980	Hissatsu Shigoto Hito	Oshino	ABC		Episode 41 "Owaza Kasane Uragaeshi"
1980	Ultraman 80	Tomoe (Peace Women's University lecturer)	TBS	Tsuburaya Productions	Episode 29 "Kaijū Teiō no Ikari"
1980	Kiri Sute Gomen	Ochika	TX	Kabukiza TV	1st Series Episode 18 "Onna-tachi no Adauchi Mujō"
1981	G-Men '75	Reiko Mizuno	TBS	Toei	Episode 305 "No-pan Kissa Satsujin Jiken"
1981	Furisode Gomen: Edo Fuyō-dō-i-kan	Kosome	CX	Toho	
1981	Ore wa Omawari-kun	Michiko Oyama	NTV	Union Motion Picture	
1981–82	Kita no Kuni kara	Kogomi	CX		
1982	Taiyō ni Hoero!	Machiko Sudo	NTV	Toho	Episode 502 "Kuse"
1982	Tokusō Saizensen		EX	Toei	Episode 293 "Kogarashi no Machi de!"
1983	Shin Onna Sōsa-kan		EX		Episode 3 "Binihon Model-goroshi no Komori-uta"
1984	Ōoku		KTV	Toei	Episode 42 "Shōjo-tachi no Furyō Hakusho"
1984	Kaze no Naka no aitsu		NTV		
1985	Maido osawagaseshimasu	Masayo Sanokura	TBS		
1985	Sukeban Deka		CX	Toei	
1985	Kyoto Yōkai Chizu 3 "Toribeyama ni Sumu 800-sai no Joshidai-sei"		EX		
1986	Onna Futari Sōsa-kan		ABC	Telepac	Episode 9 "Propose no Amai Wana"
1987	Zenigata Heiji		NTV	Union Motion Picture	Episode 17 "Abunai Oyako"
1991	Nananin no Onna Bengoshi Dai 1 Series	Kazuko Urasawa	EX	PDS	Episode 6 "Bijin Gekai no Kanzen Hanzai! Abaka reta Scandal"
1991	Shuhei Asahina Mystery 1	Kiyomi Kajiwara	NTV		
1995	Drama Shinginga / Haikei Jichikai Nagatono		NHK		
1997	Ultraman Tiga	Miyuki Ba	MBS	Tsuburaya Pro	Episode 26 "Evil Monster Realm of the Rainbow"
1997	Hamidashi Keiji Jōnetsu Kei	Toshiko Matsuzawa	EX	Toei	2nd Series Episode 11 "Shutoken Dai Panic! Furenzoku Satsujin Yokoku no Nazo!?"
1998	Taxi Driver's Mystery Diary 8 "Ai to Shi no Satsujin Meiro"		EX		
1998	Bishōjo Shinseki Gazer		EX		
2001	Kenji Yuko Kasumi 18 "Kokoro no Tenshi"		NTV		
2002	Kyotaro Nishimura Travel Mystery 37 "Yamagata Shinkansen Tsubasa no Onna"		EX		
2002	Keishichō Kanshikihan 14	Snack mama	NTV		
2007	Dondo Hare	Tomoko Maeda	NHK		Episodes 130 to 132
2010	Hanchō: Jinnan-sho Asaka Han	Fund female staff	TBS		3rd Series Episode 1
2014	Kenji Yuko Kasumi 6	Toshie Kuroda	CX		

=== Variety ===
Run	Title	Network	Notes
1971–76	TV Jockey	NTV	First Assistant
1972 – Sep 1975	Nichibeitaikō Roller Game	TX	
Oct 1973 – Sep 1974	Best 30 Kayōkyoku	EX	
1975	Kinkin Gira Gira Dai Hōsō	TX	In charge of DJ withnickname "Gira Gira"
1976–77	Meiro de Date!	TX	
	Ano Hito wa Ima!?	NTV	
2017	Ariyoshi's Meeting for Reviewing	NTV	

=== Others ===
Year	Title	Network	Notes
1984	Sekaiichi e no Chōsen: Nanboku America Tairiku Jūdan	TX	Narrator

== Discography ==
=== Single codes ===
Date	Title	Label	Lyrics	Composition	Arrangement	C/w	Lyrics	Composition	Arrangement	Notes
1 Sep 1969	Aporo Uchūsen	Nippon Crown	Shinichi Sekizawa	Saburo Iwakawa		Atarimae no uta	Yasuyuki Ouchi	Saburo Iwakawa		"Atarimae no uta": Sung with Minori Matsushima
25 Dec 1970	Dō iu wake ka	Crown Record	Hiroko Oya	Hiroyuki Nakagawa	Shiro Tsuchimochi	Kotchi o Muite	Hiroko Oya	Hiroyuki Nakagawa	Shiro Tsuchimochi	Debut release
25 Jun 1971	Wanpaku Bangaichi	Crown Record	Takeshi Kitahara	Naozumi Yamamoto	Akihiko Takashima	Wanpaku Kyōdaibun	Takeshi Takaba	Naozumi Yamamoto	Akihiko Takashima	
25 Sep 1971	Bi Yuki no Ai no Samba	Crown Record	Chikako Hara	Hiroyuki Nakagawa	Shiro Tsuchimochi	Koi o shita no yo Mama	Wa Osasa	Hiroyuki Nakagawa	Shiro Tsuchimochi	
25 Feb 1972	Sayonara o Oikakete	Crown Record	Tsugihodo Kasai	Hiroyuki Nakagawa	Hitoshisan Kosugi	Hana no Yosōi	Yoshimi Sugimoto	Hiroyuki Nakagawa	Hitoshisan Kosugi	
1972	Hirusagari no Machi		Daizaburo Nakayama	Daigo Kamata		Umibe no Madrigal	Daizaburo Nakayama			"Hirusagari no Machi": Not for sale record produced for promotion by Shinjuku men's shop "Kawano"; "Umibe no Madrigal": constituted by Daizaburo Nakayama, recited by Kojima and Tatsuya Katsura
25 May 1974	Koi wa kake hiki	King Record	Mieko Arima	Masahiko Aoi		Ki ni naru Koneko-chan	Mieko Arima	Masahiko Aoi		
25 Oct 1974	Anata no Heya de	King Record	Toyohisa Araki	Makoto Kawaguchi		Shanpan Kouta	Toyohisa Araki	Makoto Kawaguchi		

== See also ==
- List of Japanese actresses
