= U-Jin =

Japanese manga artist (born 1959)

- Born: June 15, 1959 (age 67) Ube, Yamaguchi
- Area: Artist
- Notable works: Angel; Sakura Diaries

U-Jin (遊人, Yūjin) is a Japanese manga artist specializing in lewd and pornographic manga. U-Jin has created many manga over his career and is well known for his portrayals of cute pneumatic female figures.

== Works ==
- Taxi Driver (TAXIドライバー, Takushii Doraibā) (1987)
- Angel (1988)
- Himei wa o-shizuka ni (悲鳴はお静かに) (1989)
- Kōnai Shasei (校内写生) (1989)
- Kyūkyoku no Chef wa Oishinbo Papa (究極のシェフは美味しんぼパパ) (1989)
- U-Jin Brand (遊人ブランド, Yūjin Burando) (1991)
- Juliet (1992)
- Walking on (ウォーキングオン, Wōkingu On) (1992)
- Chō DNA Senshi Frogmen (超DNA戦士 フロッグマン, Chō Dīenuē Senshi Furogguman) (1993)
- Lyceenne (1993 Artbook)
- Nankyoku 28-gō (南極28号, Nankyoku Nijūhachigō) (1994)
- U-Jeune (遊ジェンヌ, Yūjennu) (1994 Artbook)
- Vixens (ヴィジョナリイ, Vijonarī) (1994)
- Infinity (インフィニティ, Infiniti)
- Kanojo no Inbō (彼女の陰謀)
- Sigh (サイ)
- Fobia (フォビア)
- Chō Quatres (超キャートルズ, Chō Kyātoruzu)
- Sakura Diaries (桜通信, Sakura Tsūshin) (1995)
- Private Psycho Lesson (個人授業, Kojin Jugyō) (1996)
- Premium (プレミア, Puremia)
- Loose Socks (Artbook)
- Shampoo Colon (シャンプーコロン, Shanpū Koron)
- Refreme (リフレイム, Rifureimu) (1999)
- Girls Rush (ギャルズラッシュ, Gyaruzu Rasshu) (1999)
- Sakuranbo Tsūshin (桜んぼ通信) (Artbook)
- Fruit Punch (フルーツ・ポンチ, Furūtsu Ponchi) (2001)
- Peach! (2001)
- Candy (キャンディー [遊人Sweetgirlsイラスト集]) (2002)
- Up-To-Date
- Gakuen Tengoku (学園天国) (2003)
- Angel: the women whom delivery host Kosuke Atami healed (2006)
- Angel season 2 (2008)
- Osanazuma Marple no Jikenbo (幼な妻マープルの事件簿, Osanazuma Māpuru no Jikenbo) (2009)
- Q&I (Kyūkyoku no Chef wa Oishinbo Papa and Infinity)
