= Miyuki =

- Pronunciation: MEE-yoo-kee
- Gender: Female

Origin
- Origin: Japanese
- Meaning: Different meanings depending on the kanji used
- Region of origin: Japan

Miyuki is a feminine Japanese given name.

== Written forms ==
Miyuki can be written using different kanji characters and can mean:

- 美幸, "beautiful fortune" or "beautiful happiness"
- 深雪, "deep snow"
- 美雪, "beautiful snow"
- 美由紀, "beautiful reason for history"
- 幸, "happiness" or "good fortune"

The name can also be written in hiragana (みゆき) or katakana (ミユキ).

== People with the name ==
- Miyuki (Epcot), candy sculptor appearing in the Japanese pavilion in the Epcot Center at Walt Disney World
- Miyuki Akiyama (秋山 美幸; born 1984), Japanese volleyball player
- Miyuki Fukumoto (福本 幸; born 1977), Japanese high jumper
- Miyuki Hashimoto (橋本 みゆき; born 1980), Japanese singer
- Miyuki Hatanaka (畑中 みゆき; born 1975), Japanese freestyle skier
- Miyuki Hatoyama (鳩山 幸; born 1943), former Japanese first lady, wife of Yukio Hatoyama, formerly performed as an actress Miyuki Waka at the Takarazuka Revue
- Miyuki Iguchi, Japanese athlete
- Miyuki Imori (井森 美幸; born 1968), Japanese television personality, idol, actress and singer
- Miyuki Ishikawa (石川 ミユキ; 1897–1987), Japanese midwife and serial killer
- Miyuki Izumi (泉 美幸; born 1975), Japanese women's footballer
- Miyuki Kanbe (神戸 みゆき; 1984–2008), Japanese actress, model and singer
- Miyuki Kano (狩野 美雪; born 1977), Japanese volleyball player
- Miyuki Katagiri (片桐 美雪; born 1948), Japanese alpine skier
- Miyuki Kawamura (河村 美幸; born 1994), Japanese women's basketball player
- Miyuki Kawanaka (川中 美幸; born 1955), Japanese enka singer
- Miyuki Kitagawa (北川 みゆき; born 1967), Japanese manga artist
- Miyuki Kobayashi (writer) (小林 深雪), Japanese writer
- Miyuki Kobayashi (canoeist) (小林 美幸; born 1967), Japanese sprint canoeist
- Miyuki Koizumi (小泉 深雪; born 1979), Japanese model
- Miyuki Kojima (児島 みゆき; born 1952), Japanese actress and singer
- Miyuki Komatsu (小松 みゆき; born 1971), Japanese actress
- Miyuki Maeda (前田 美順; born 1985), Japanese badminton player
- Miyuki Maekawa (前川 みゆき; born 1956), Japanese fencer
- Miyuki Matsuda (松田 美由紀; born 1961), Japanese actress
- Miyuki Matsuhisa (松久 ミユキ; born 1945), Japanese artistic gymnast
- Miyuki Matsushita (松下 美由紀; born 1969), Japanese voice actress
- Miyuki Miura (三浦 美幸; born 1949), Japanese karateka
- Miyuki Miyabe (宮部 みゆき; born 1960), Japanese writer
- Miyuki Nakagawa (中川 未由希; born 1986), Japanese field hockey player
- Miyuki Nakajima (中島 みゆき; born 1952), Japanese singer
- Miyuki Okumura (奥村 心雪), Japanese graphic designer
- Miyuki Ono (小野 みゆき; born 1959), Japanese actress
- Miyuki Satoh (佐藤 美幸), Japanese curler
- Miyuki Sawashiro (沢城 みゆき; born 1985), Japanese voice actress
- Miyuki Shimazaki (島崎 みゆき; born 1974), Japanese volleyball player
- Miyuki Shirata (白田 美由希; born 1984), Japanese sprint canoeist
- Miyuki Tai (born 1980), Japanese badminton player
- Miyuki Takahashi (高橋 みゆき; born 1978), Japanese volleyball player
- Miyuki Takahashi (athlete) (高橋 美由紀; born 1946), Japanese pentathlete
- Miyuki Tanobe, Canadian painter
- Miyuki Ueda (上田 みゆき; born 1944), Japanese voice actress
- Miyuki Uehara (上原 美幸; born 1995), Japanese long-distance runner
- Miyuki Ueta (上田 美由紀; born 1974), Japanese murderer
- Miyuki Watanabe (渡辺 美優紀; born 1993), Japanese singer, actress and idol
- Miyuki Yamashita (山下 美幸; born 1971), Japanese rower
- Miyuki Yanagita (柳田 美幸; born 1981), Japanese women's footballer
- Miyuki Yokoyama (横山美雪, born 1989), former Japanese AV actress

== Fictional characters ==
- Miyuki (Tokyo Godfathers) (ミユキ), a character in the anime film Tokyo Godfathers
- Miyuki (美幸), protagonist of the manga series Miyuki-chan in Wonderland
- Miyuki, a character in the manga series Murciélago
- Miyuki, a character in the video game KanColle
- Miyuki (みゆき), a character in the video game Ordyne
- Miyuki, a character in the manga series YuYu Hakusho
- Miyuki Aiba (相葉みゆき), a character in the anime series Tekkaman Blade
- Miyuki Asakura (朝倉みゆき), a character in the video game Guns Girl Z
- Miyuki Ayukawa (鮎川みゆき), a character in the anime Basquash!
- Miyuki Chinen (知念みゆき), a character in the anime Fresh Pretty Cure!
- Miyuki Chitose (千歳 みゆき), a character in the manga series The Prince of Tennis
- Miyuki Enomoto (榎本美由紀), a character in the light novel series Haruhi Suzumiya
- Miyuki Hebinuma (蛇沼みゆき), a character in the manga series Kowloon Generic Romance
- Miyuki Hoshizora (星空 みゆき), a character in the anime series Smile PreCure!
- Miyuki Irie (入江 みゆき), a character in the anime series Angel Beats!
- Miyuki Itsumi (ミユキ・イツミ), a character in the video game Xenosaga
- Miyuki Kazuya (御幸一也), a character in the manga series Ace of the Diamond
- Miyuki Kikuchi (菊地みゆき), a character in the manga series Futari Ecchi
- Miyuki Kitano (北野みゆき), a character in the manga series Mizuiro Jidai
- Miyuki Kobayakawa (小早川 美幸), protagonist of the manga series You're Under Arrest
- Miyuki Kotobuki (寿みゆき), a character in the visual novel Tokimeki Memorial 2
- Miyuki Kujo (九条みゆき), a character in the light novel Shomin Sample
- Miyuki Kuwano (桑野みゆき), a character in the manga series Nurse Angel Ririka SOS
- Miyuki Minase (水瀬美雪), a character in the video game Digimon Survive
- Miyuki Nanase (七瀬 美雪), a character in the manga series The Kindaichi Case Files, Psychic Detective Yakumo
- Miyuki Ozu (小津 深雪), a character in the tokusatsu series Mahō Sentai Magiranger
- Miyuki Rokujō (六条 深雪), a character in the manga series Strawberry Panic
- Miyuki Sagara (相楽 深行), a character in the novel series Red Data Girl
- Miyuki Sakuragi (桜木みゆき), a character in the manga The Yakuza's Guide to Babysitting
- Miyuki Shiba (司波 深雪), a character in the light novel series The Irregular at Magic High School
- Miyuki Shirakawa (白川みゆき), a character in the video game Macross Ace Frontier
- Miyuki Shiratori (白鳥みゆき), a character in the manga series Shutendoji
- Miyuki Shirogane (白銀 御行), a character in the manga series Kaguya-sama: Love Is War
- Miyuki Sone (曽根みゆき), a character in the visual novel You and Me and Her: A Love Story
- Miyuki Suzumura (鈴村みゆき), a character in the anime Tropical-Rouge! Pretty Cure
- Miyuki Takamachi (高町 美由希), a character in the visual novel Triangle Heart
- Miyuki Takara (高良 みゆき), a character in the manga series Lucky Star
- Miyuki Tezuka (手塚 海之), a character in the tokusatsu series Kamen Rider Ryuki
- Miyuki Wakamatsu (若松 みゆき) and Miyuki Kashima (鹿島 みゆき), characters in the manga series Miyuki
- Miyuki Yoshinaga (吉永 みゆき), a character in the tokusatsu series Kamen Rider Blade
