= Nihon Bungeisha =

Japanese publisher

Nihon Bungeisha Co., Ltd 株式会社日本文芸社
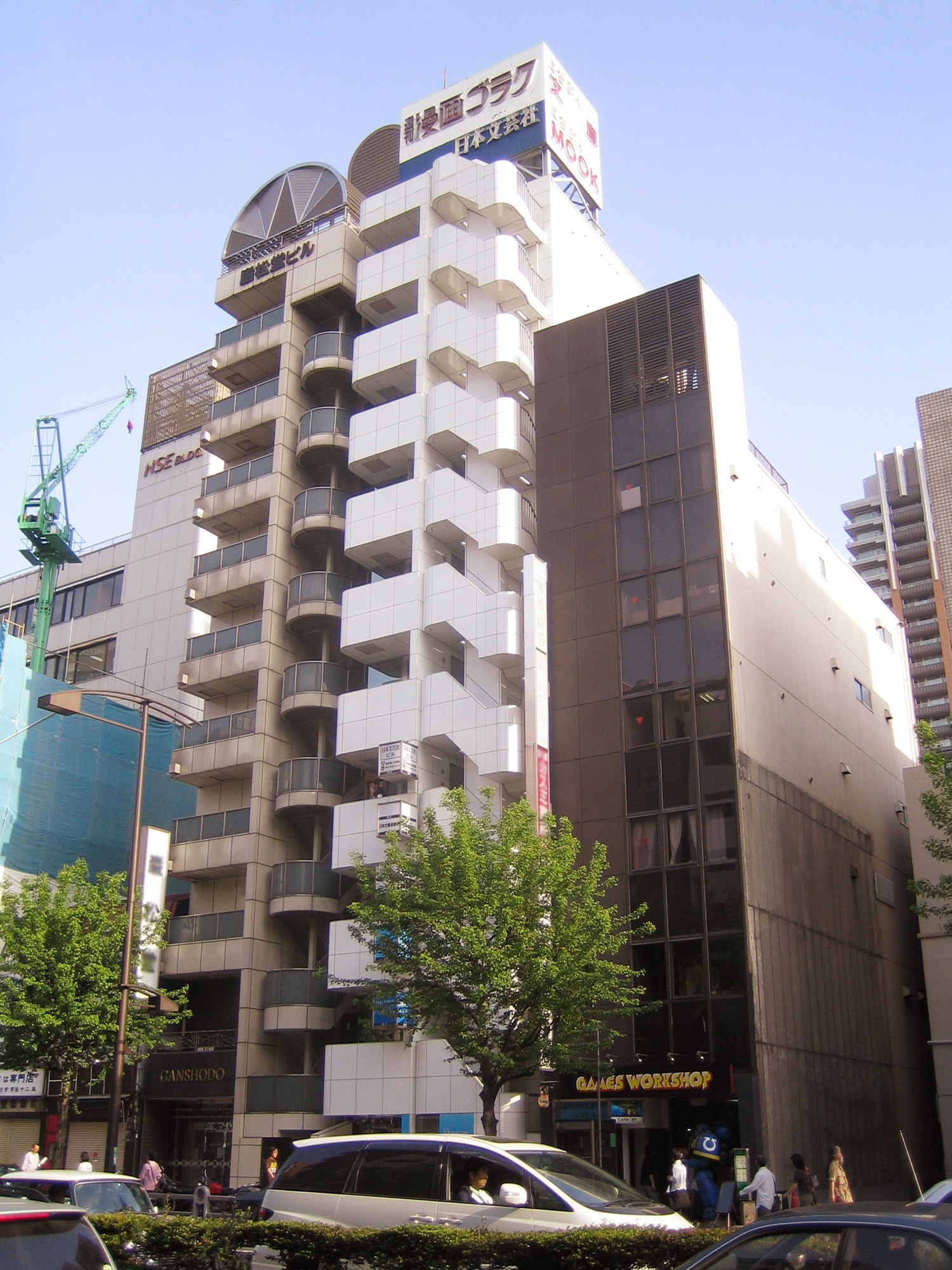
- Type: Kabushiki gaisha
- Industry: Publishing
- Founded: January 1959
- Headquarters: 〒101-8407; Tokyo-to, Chiyoda-ku; Kanda-Jinbōchō 1-7
- Area served: Japan
- Products: Magazines, manga, picture books, light novels, educational books, reference books, other books
- Number of employees: 73 (as of December 31, 2009)
- Website: http://www.nihonbungeisha.co.jp/

Nihon Bungeisha Co., Ltd. (株式会社日本文芸社, Kabushiki Kaisha Nihon Bungeisha), or Nichibun (にちぶん), is a book and magazine publisher established in 1959 and based in Chiyoda, Tokyo, Japan.

== Magazines ==
- Weekly Manga Goraku
- Comic Heaven
- Bessatsu Manga Goraku
- Manga Goraku Nexter
- Golf Lesson Comic
- Manga Pachinko Dairenshō
- Hissatsu Pchisuro Fan
- Keiba Gold
- Illust Logic
- Skeleton Club
- Conbini Comic Kawaguchi Hiroshi Tankentai Mikaku Ninseibutsu no 5-banashi
