= Akane Tsunemori =

Fictional character from Psycho-Pass

- Psycho-Pass character
- Akane Tsunemori as seen in Psycho-Pass official website
- First appearance: Psycho-Pass Episode 1: "Crime Coefficient"
- Created by: Gen Urobuchi
- Designed by: Akira Amano
- Voiced by: Japanese: Kana Hanazawa; English: Kate Oxley

Akane Tsunemori (Japanese: 常守 朱, Hepburn: Tsunemori Akane) is a protagonist of the anime series Psycho-Pass. She is introduced as a novice Inspector assigned to Division One of the Public Safety Bureau's Criminal Investigation Division. Over the course of the series, Akane examines the social and ethical underpinnings of the Sibyl System's governance of Japan and her own idealistic values. Akane is noted for her remarkable psychological fortitude, which keeps her Psycho-Pass score consistently low in the face of extraordinary challenges. In addition to the anime series, Akane appears as the protagonist of the continuation film Psycho-Pass: The Movie (2015), and the manga and novel adaptations of the series.

Akane was created as a relatable audience surrogate who would evolve into a noticeably strong-willed protagonist by the second series and the 2015 film. Writer Gen Urobuchi stated that when creating the duo of Akane and Kogami, their traits were balanced to make them striking. However, in retrospect, Urobuchi believes Akane became one of the strongest characters he ever created. Akane is voiced in Japanese by Kana Hanazawa and by Kate Oxley in the English dubs.

Critical reception to Akane in early episodes was mixed as the media felt she was too weak due to her inexperience in the force. However, her character arc in the first anime and her stronger portrayal starting from there to her role in the sequels and the film earned major praise. Her dynamic with Kogami was also well received by the audience.

== Creation ==
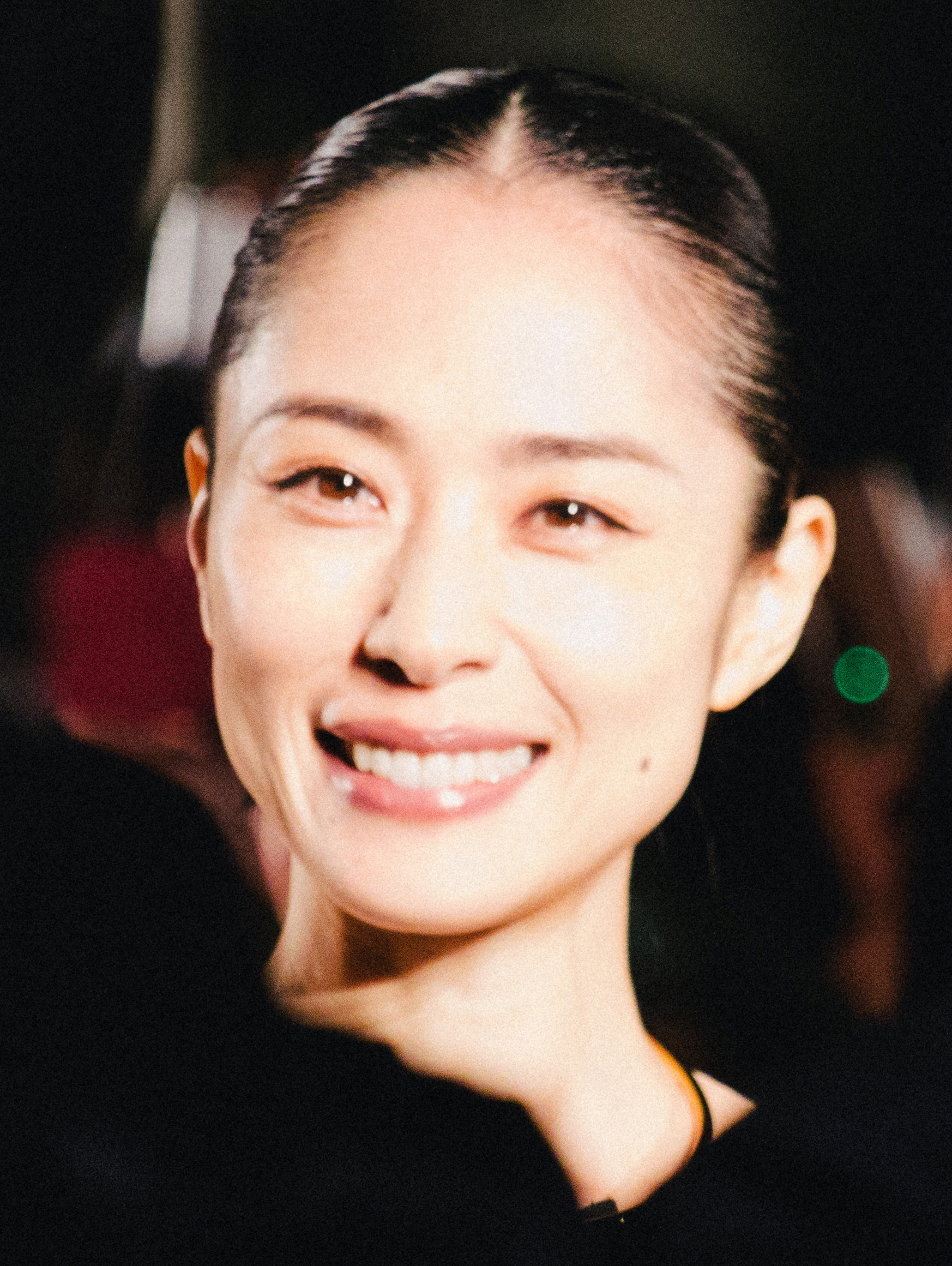
Tsunemori was inspired by Eri Fukatsu's (pictured) character from Bayside Shakedown: Sumire Onda

Akane Tsunemori was conceptualized by Production I.G staff to be the most relatable character in the series, acting as an audience surrogate who would critique the setting and the ideological conflict between the protagonist Shinya Kogami and the antagonist Shogo Makishima. One of the staff's objectives for the series was also to chart Akane's transformation into a heroine. Writer Gen Urobuchi said that when he created Kogami and Tsunemori, he tried to balance their traits. Writer Tow Ubukata, who supervised the second anime series, called Kogami a "wild" character, the Japanese characters for his last name referring to his traits of loneliness and strength. The duo was further stated to resemble the lead characters from the Japanese police comedy-drama Bayside Shakedown, Sumire Onda and Shunsaku Aoshima.

Akane is introduced in Psycho-Pass as an innocent rookie who matures through her experiences. During episode 11 of the series, one of Akane's best friends is murdered in front of her by Makishima. Urobuchi originally wanted the anime staff to show Akane's emotional reaction to the murder by having her throw up, but this did not make it to the final cut. Gen Urobuchi said that while creating Kogami and Akane, he tried to balance their traits but felt that Akane ended up becoming one of his strongest characters because of her development in the first television series when she clashed with Makishima and her ideals.

Because the first Psycho-Pass series focused primarily on the clash between Kogami and Makishima, the second television series introduced an antagonist who acted as Akane's nemesis now that the plot centered around her. Psycho-Pass: The Movie characterized her as even more assertive and self-sufficient. Much attention is focused on Akane as Kogami is not present in contrast to the first series where the duo balanced each other's personalities. The creators were inspired by films like Apocalypse Now and Saving Private Ryan, to tell a story about Akane searching a war zone for the renegade Kogami. The non-romantic dynamic between the two characters appealed to the creators because of the deep trust they have for each other.

For Providence, Shiotani specifically wanted Akane Tsunemori to be the film's protagonist while Shinya Kogami would remain as her partner in a sense of a buddy cop. The center of the story was the strong relationship between Akane and Kogami. While Fukami found the idea of a romance these two as romantic, he aimed to go further. Instead, they act more like comrades, fighting the same enemy. Fukami was always conscious of the relationship and distance between the two when writing the script. Ubukuta found the idea of a romance could be troublesome to the narrative as it would affect more their personalities. Ubukata said Tsunemori is artless as she does not possess a peculiar way of thinking about things and doesn't lose the courage to say things that ought to be a given as though they are a given. This change led to similarities with Kogami. Shiotani wanted to rebuild Akane's and Kogami's relationship returns even if they belonged to a different organisation. The scenes in which the two of them appear together came together naturally. He reflected that Kogami is frank about his voice without paying attention about how he is received while Akane is more straightforward. Shiotani wanted strong scenes about their relationship shaped by the entire franchise. Nevertheless, he considers Akane mindful. Saiga's death scene was one of the hardest to animate, most notably the expression Akane performs upon seeing him. Saiga's voice actor was worried about the impact the character would live in the protagonist.

=== Design ===
Sketches of Tsunemori by Akira Amano.

Wanting the series to be "anti-moe", the production team avoided showing Akane removing her clothes, and instead featured scenes where Kogami would remove his. Akane's physical appearance was designed by manga artist Akira Amano. Due to her and Kogami being the lead characters, Kyoji Asano felt like he could care about them. Director Naoyoshi Shiotani shared similar feelings, stating he wanted Akane's traits to balance with Kogami's as they are the main duo of Psycho-Pass. He further stated that one of her original characteristics was her "masculine" traits despite her gender. Since the character's creation, Shiotani had thoughts about what would her role be in the future, most notably regarding her imprisonment in Psycho-Pass 3.

While Akira Amano conceived her looks, Kyoji Asano handled the anime design. Asano emphasized the major contrasts between them when illustrating Kogami and Akane; Kogami wields a weapon freely with one hand, and Akane wields it with both hands indicating that she is less highly trained. In adapting Amano's design under Shiotani's direction for the 2015 anime, animator Naoyuki Onda drew multiple outfits that Tsunemori wears such in order to make her fashionable in her civilian life. However, Onda expressed difficulties in designing others looks for the character something which made him ask for help for other designers working in the movie.

=== Casting ===
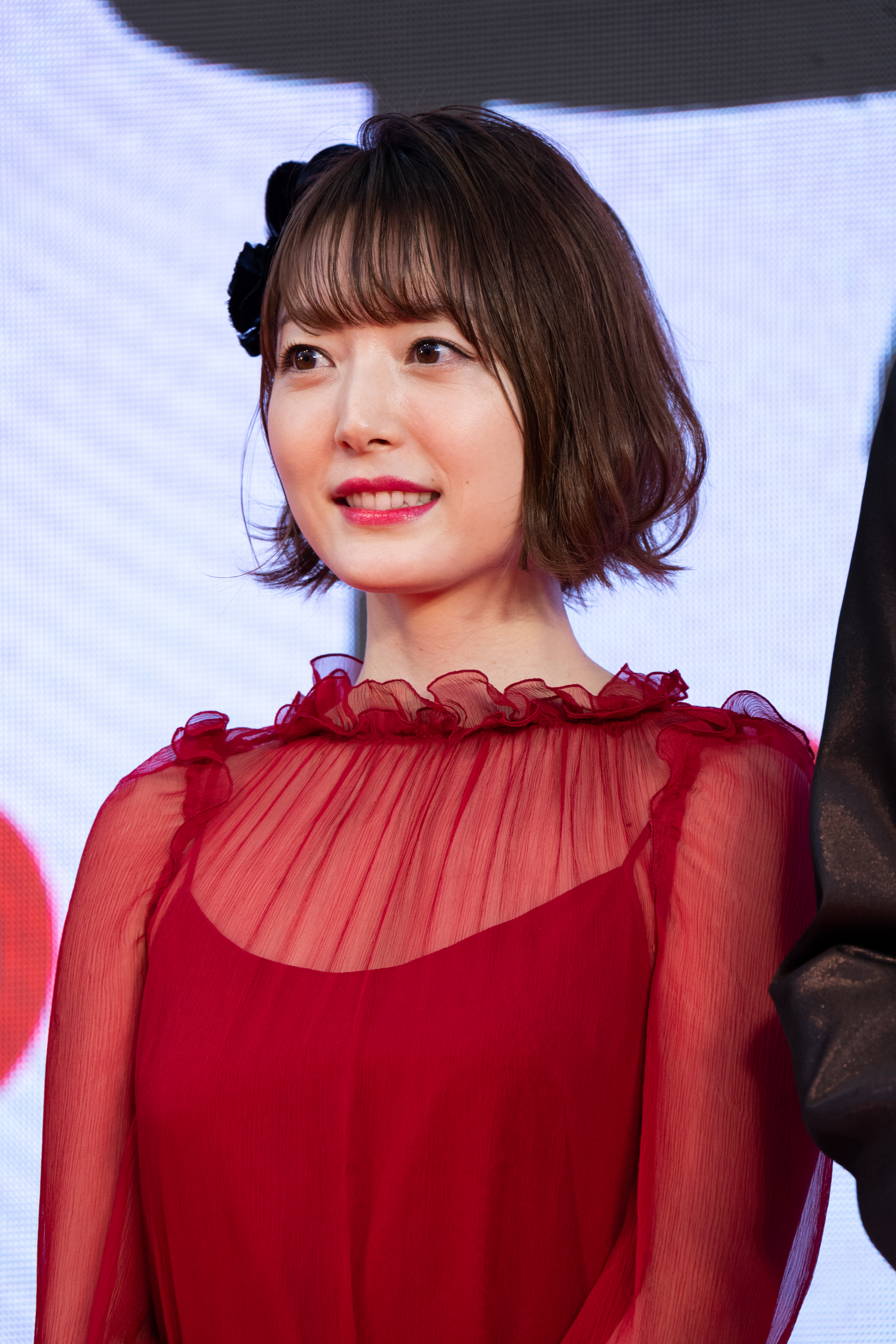
Kana Hanazawa voices Akane in Japanese

Japanese actress Kana Hanazawa, who voices Akane in Japanese. said that her character is initially portrayed as a weak person but following the second episode, she starts showing potential for a lead. Hanazawa said one of the focal points of the series after the third episode was the changes Akane would undergo; she would be influenced by many unfamiliar, traumatic experiences she must endure as part of her policing role.

For the movie, Hanazawa was surprised at the proposal that she speak multiple English lines at the end in the movie although she enjoyed her work. The anime staff praised how she managed to convey different takes on Akane since the first series. Her stronger persona was felt to be faithful to the original Tsunemori from previous television series. Both Japanese actors playing Kogami and Akane agreed noted their characters did not share a romantic relationship by the movie's events despite their close interactions; one of them believed Ginoza had more romantic potential with Akane. The duo was said to resemble Sumire Onda and Shunsaku Aoshima, the lead characters from the Japanese police comedy-drama Bayside Shakedown. Kazuhiro Yamaji, who plays Joji Saika, said that since his character has been a mentor to Akane since the first television series, he could see notable growth of the lead in the film which can be also seen thanks to the work of Hanazawa. Hanazawa expressed joy in doing the role after 10 years as she was touched by the role the character took, reflected in the ending theme "Tōjisha".

English voice actress Kate Oxley said that after debuting Baki The Grappler of being a major actress due to her lack of experience. She was often cast by Funimation in minor roles including young males until one of her first female characters: Tsunemori. Upon being cast for Psycho-Pass, Oxley expressed joy due to liking the work as well as the multiple actors behind the English dub. Tsunemori was the first lead character Oxley played in her career having been selected by the casting director Zach Bolton. Oxley feels lucky for having been cast in the series. The actress expressed pressure over attracting most fans who were more attached to the Japanese cast but noted that by the time she started working in the series, there was a growing popularity for English dubs which led to a relief as he she believes both the cast and the fandom wished to see more Psycho-Pass and popularity would help. In regard to other actors, Oxley was pleased with working with Kogami's Robert McCollum due to their previous experience in other works. In retrospect, she found her experience positive, regarding Tsunemori as a strong protagonist due to how she connects with her across the narrative. For Oxley, the most important part of Tsunemori was she questioned society often but still goes along with the flow but still retains her morals and values.

== Appearances ==
=== Psycho-Pass ===
The 20-year-old main female protagonist of Psycho-Pass, Akane joins Division One of the Public Safety Bureau's Criminal Investigation Division as a rookie Inspector. She is initially uncomfortable with apprehending or executing people based on their potential criminal behavior. On her first assignment, Akane stuns Enforcer Shinya Kogami and prevents the execution of a kidnap and assault victim whose Psycho-Pass spiked because of the trauma they had endured. While Akane is reprimanded, Kogami expresses gratitude for her intervention. Akane's tendency to question protocol puts her at odds with the cautious senior Inspector, Nobuchika Ginoza. As Division One pursues criminal mastermind Shogo Makishima, who seeks to undermine Sibyl, Makashima retaliates by taking Akane's best friend Yuki hostage. Makashima threatens to execute her unless Akane uses a shotgun to kill him, instead of relying on Sibyl and her Dominator. Akane attempts to use the shotgun, but hesitates and misses. Makishima retaliates and executes Yuki in front of her. Akane and Kogami later arrest Makishima but he escapes P.S.B. custody, prompting Kogami to go rogue to kill Makishima himself. Sibyl reveals the true nature of the Sibyl System: a group mind of asymptomatic human brains working in tandem to judge individuals. Sibyl wants to add Makishima's brain to their collective and asks Akane to arrest Makishima before Kogami can kill him, in exchange for sparing Kogami's life. Akane accepts Sibyl's offer and leads Division One to Makishima as he attempts to poison the country's food supply. Akane is incapacitated while doing so. Kogami uses the opportunity to execute Makashima. Sibyl informs Akane it will not kill her because it knows she will keep its secret out of self-preservation, and to avoid the mass chaos revealing it would cause.

=== Psycho-Pass 2 ===
In Psycho-Pass 2 the C.I.D. find itself under attack by Kirito Kamui, an anti-Sibyl terrorist invisible to Sibyl's scanners. Kamui is immune to Sibyl's judgment because he was implanted with body parts and personalities of several victims of a plane crash caused by Sibyl many years ago. Sibyl's scanners see him as a collective entity, which it does not know how to judge. Tōgane attempts to influence Akane to murder Kamui by murdering Akane's grandmother and framing Kamui. Kamui uses a hacked Dominator to force Akane to lead him inside Sibyl's processing center. Sibyl implores Akane to eliminate Kamui, but she attempts to arrest him instead. Kamui then reveals the true reason he brought Akane; Sibyl's adjustment means that Psycho-Pass scores now factor in a Dominator wielder's own judgment and morality as well. Kamui believes Akane's sense of justice and morality is significant enough that she could judge and execute Sybil if she wished. Kamui then suggests Akane voluntarily join Sibyl, in the hopes that her morality will permeate throughout the collective and transform it into a truly benevolent force. Tōgane ambushes them and tempts Akane to murder him by confessing to killing her grandmother. Kamui intervenes by simultaneously killing Tōgane and letting Tōgane kill him.

=== Psycho-Pass: The Movie ===
In the 2015 film Psycho-Pass: The Movie, Akane thwarts a terrorist plot by illegal immigrants from the Southeast Asia Union, or SEAUn, a war-torn superstate importing Sibyl technology to police its population. After seeing evidence that Kogami trained them, Akane is granted permission to travel to SEAUn to investigate and potentially arrest him. Akane meets Kogami, who is surprised to hear about the SEAUn terrorists in Japan. Akane goes with Kogami to visit the rebel headquarters which also houses many refugees. When the base comes under attack, Akane returns to the capital and hacks SEAUn's Sybil system to grant C.I.D. analyst Shion Karanomori access. They discover SEAUn's Psycho-Pass scanners have been hacked to mask the high Psycho-Pass scores of Colonel Wong and his forces. Akane is subdued by Wong and reunited with Kogami, who has also been captured. Wong admits to planning a coup d'état, and having Chairman Han assassinated and replaced with an imposter shortly after Akane arrived. Karanomori disables the Psycho-Pass hack on Wong and his men, revealing them as threats to Sibyl's scanners and security drones. Akane's team also arrives to save her. Akane confronts the Han imposter and confirms it is a cyborg controlled by Sibyl. Akane argues that Sibyl depriving the people of SEAUn a say in their own government will create more unrest and civil conflict, and betrays fundamental human rights. She convinces Sibyl to announce, through its Chairman Han's avatar, free elections.

=== Psycho-Pass: Sinners of the System ===
In the 2019 film trilogy Psycho-Pass: Sinners of the System, Akane made cameo appearances in the first and second film. In the first film titled Case.1 Crime and Punishment, Akane instructs inspector Mika Shimotsuki along with two enforcers Nobuchika Ginoza and Yayoi Kunizuka, to investigate an isolation facility called "Sanctuary" run by the Ministry of Economy. In the second film titled Case.2 First Guardian, Akane introduces Frederica Hanashiro from Ministry of Foreign Affairs to fellow Division One's co-worker at the beginning of the film.

=== Psycho-Pass 3 ===
In the 2019 anime series Psycho-Pass 3, Akane has been imprisoned for unknown actions and is expected to see judgment. Nevertheless, she is looking forward to the actions of two new Inspectors, Arata Shindo and Kei Mikhail Ignatov. In the finale, Akane, still imprisoned, meets a returning Kogami and two start discussing what they did during the time Kogami had left the society.

=== Psycho-Pass 3: First Inspector ===
Akane is released from jail in the 2020 film Psycho-Pass 3: First Inspector where Kogami invites her to a meal.

=== Psycho-Pass: Providence ===
In the 2023 anime film Psycho-Pass Providence, Akane and Kogami handle a new faction of terrorists. The events take place before the events of Psycho-Pass 3 and explain the reason why Akane was imprisoned.

=== Other appearances ===
Akane also appears in the manga Inspector Akane Tsunemori, an adaptation of the first anime series, and makes a cameo in the prequel Inspector Shinya Kogami. She also appears in the series' self-parody manga, Gakuen Psycho-Pass by Shiina Soga, and is a supporting character in the visual novel Psycho-Pass: Mandatory Happiness. The character appeared in a promotional crossover image for Godzilla: City on the Edge of Battle.

== Reception ==
=== Critical response ===
Reactions to Akane during the series' early episodes were mixed. Hiroko Yamamura from Japanator liked the way the first episode focused on Akane's first day as a police officer and her opinions about it. Rebecca Silverman of Anime News Network and Thomas Zoth of The Fandom Post expressed similar response to her debut due to how she different she was from other cops. Zoth said that in later episodes he liked the relationships Akane established with Masaoka and Ginoza, which resulted in several interesting scenes, and grew to care about Akane during the first half of the series in "a somewhat ironically 'moe' way, as she's grown as a character". Neo magazine's David West noted how weak Akane's character was in early episodes because Kogami did all the work. Bamboo Dong of Anime News Network was more critical of the character, calling her "a blank slate". She said Akane is "uninteresting and forgettable, and her previous role in the show as the moral compass seems to have waned as well". Fantasy Mundo's Patricia Llamas stated the manga adaptation was faithful to Akane's characterization as it explored the deep bond with Kogami and the flaws with the Sybil System, a theme also explored with the other members of the cast.

Despite initial mixed reactions to the character, Akane's growth during the series earned praise. Chris Beveridge of The Fandom Post website was more optimistic based on her stronger behaviour. Silverman said that ever since her best friend's death at Shogo Makishima's hands, Akane underwent major character development due to how she views the law as well as bond with Kogami. In a later review, Dong said the character's uninteresting traits stop appearing in the second half of the series. Zoth appreciated her character arc in the climax as seen through Ginoza's perspective. Similarly, Bamboo Dong and Kotaku said, found her more appealing due to her character arc.

As for the second anime, Kotaku praised the differences between Akane and the new Inspector, Mika Shimotsuki. In anticipation of the movie, IGN writer Miranda Sanchez expected to see more interactions between Kogami and Akane due to Psycho-Pass 2 lacking that. However, she noted this bond was not fully explored. Jacob Chapman enjoyed Akane's interactions with Kogami in the role such as one scene where Akane starts comparing Kogami with the late villain Makishima. Otaku USA's Alexandria Hill also praised the first interactions between these two characters for its action as it contrasted with the heavy use of dialogue in the beginning. In the book Law and Justice in Japanese Popular Culture: From Crime Fighting Robots to Duelling Pocket Monsters, Akane is regarded as a person committed to following the law despite acknowledging its issues. This has a major impact on the supporting characters, most notably Kogami, due to how shock they are about Akane's values. Chris Beveridge of The Fandom Post praised the actions of both Kogami and Akane in the film. Akane's role in the film Providence was further praised for once again interacting with Kogami and being further developed than in previous works.

UK Anime Network liked Kana Hanazawa for the stronger tone she provided for her character in comparison to the previous works; UK Anime News enjoyed the English version. Crunchyroll praised her performance, most notably in the latest film Providence for being able to give Akane the same tone he gave him previous works.

Álvaro Rodríguez Sánchez from University of Salamanca described Akane as a strong character despite her aura of weakness thanks to her hero's journey explored across the television series. Kogami was found similar to Akane due to their sense of justice and caring personalities when working together but the Enforcer is different due to his dark past caused by his stress following his partner's death. Stopping Kogami from becoming a criminal is Akane's main objective in the climax which seems nearly possible when the two exchange their values. Akane is seen as a rookie hero due to how only her sees the true behind the Sybil System and manages to keep her strong sense of justice. However, her failure to stop Kogami was compared with Greek myths by the writer especially with the impact it has on one another.

=== Popularity ===
Akane also won the Miss Noitamina award in an official poll involving characters that appeared in noitamina television series. In the 2013 Newtype anime awards, Akane was voted the third-best female character. In 2015, she once again took that place. The same year, a Charapedia poll, which asked fans to list their favourite "cool" women in anime, had Akane placed 10th with 257 votes. In a 2019 poll by Anime! Anime! she was listed as the top character fans wanted to have as their boss.
