= SICAF =

SICAF may refer to:

- Seoul International Cartoon and Animation Festival
- Société d'investissement à capital fixe (incorporated investment fund)
- Société International de Choux, Agriculture et Fleurs, main horticulture association in France.
