= Mika Shimotsuki =

- Psycho-Pass character
- As shown on the Psycho-Pass official website
- Created by: Tow Ubukata, Gen Urobuchi
- Designed by: Akira Amano
- Voiced by: Ayane Sakura; Cherami Leigh (English)

Mika Shimotsuki (Japanese: 霜月 美佳, Hepburn: Shimotsuki Mika) is a fictional character, introduced in the anime Psycho-Pass by Production I.G. A minor character in the 2012 series, Shimotsuki's role has gained importance in the sequels, in which she becomes an inspector working in Unit One, an organization fighting crimes in a future where people live according to the will of the Sybl System. She has returned in following media, most notably as a protagonist in the first film of the Psycho-Pass: Sinners of the System trilogy. By Psycho-Pass 3, Shimotsuki has become the leader of Unit One, looking after the new cast. She is voiced by Ayane Sakura in Japanese and by Cherami Leigh in English.

Shimotsuki was created by writers Tow Ubukata and Gen Urobuchi in Psycho-Pass 2, as a supporting character contrasting with Nobuchika Ginoza.

== Appearances ==
The character first appears in season 1, episode 6, attending Oso Academy as a high school student and schoolmate of Rikako Oryo. Two of her friends become Rikako's victims during the story arc. At the end of season 1, Mika Shimotsuki becomes a MWPSB inspector, in the same team as Akane Tsunemori. In Psycho-Pass 2, Shimotsuki learns that one of her allies is scheming against Tsunemori. When Shimotsuki is discovered, she is forced to cooperate with the schemer, and with the Sybil System. Now knowing that the Sybil is a collective consciousness, Shimotsuki finds herself turning into a Sybil puppet. Shimotsuki returns in the 2015 film, where she and the chief of the group trick Tsunemori into going to another country to deal with Tsunemori's former underling, the mercenary Shinya Kogami, and use the duo's teamwork to overcome them. In the climax, Shimotsuki and Unit One save Kogami and Tsunemori from armed soldiers.

Shimotsuki returns in the 2019 film Sinners of the System. Akane Tsunemori's team is directed to return a woman to a special experimental prison, where the woman had worked as a therapist. Tsunemori dispatches fellow inspector Mika Shimotsuki, along with two Enforcers, Nobuchika Ginoza and Yayoi Kunizuka, to investigate the prison, while Tsunemori and the rest of the team investigate the case in Tokyo. Through a new combination of drugs, therapy, and work, the prison has produced a different kind of society, where latent criminal prisoners act in harmony with one another. Shimotsuki sees the woman as a criminal deserving of death, but she and Ginoza then realize that the woman has used herself as bait to try to protect a small child. The duo discovers that the warden is exploiting the prisoners to harvest nuclear waste buried beneath the prison, causing the prisoners to die of radiation. Shimotsuki records the warden's confession of her actions and reveals it to the prisoners. Shimotsuki then kills the warden, but the prisoners riot. Shimotsuki and Ginoza hunt down the rest of the complicit staff, and begin working to protect the prisoners. They later discover that the Sybil System knew of the warden's actions, as the prison is located above the System's former nuclear waste dumping ground.

Shimotsuki returns as the chief of Unit 1 in Psycho-Pass 3, where she directs Arata Shinto and Kei Ignatov, along with multiple forces. The group clashes with the Ministry of Foreign Affairs team, who are dealing with two groups known as the Foxes and Biforst. In the 2020 film Psycho-Pass 3: First Inspector, Shimotsuki's group is trapped inside a building by a terrorist who wants to kill the Tokyo governor, Karina Komiya. Unwilling to hand over Komiya, Shimotsuki and her team fight to defeat the terrorists.

== Creation and development ==
As a new character, working as an Inspector, Mika Shimotsuki was given newcomer traits. During development, director Naoyoshi Shiotani was not able to explain the ways in which these traits differed from Akane Tsunemori's, because the series was still premiering. The staff described Shimotsuki's role as "extremely difficult". The staff were said to love Shimotsuki for the same reason that fans disliked her. Staff reported that, while Nobuchika Ginoza was used as an unlikable inspector in the first series, often the staff and the audience could not bring themselves to hate him. Given that reaction, they made Shimotsuki a less likable character.

The staff decided to create the impression that Shimotsuki undergoes a major change in the second series, and then have her start from that point in the 2015 movie. Tow Ubukata claimed he ended up liking Shimotsuki to the point of joking he would marry her. Gen Urobuchi agreed that Shimotsuki's characterization changed for the movie so that she became a likable character. Ubukata described her as a bureaucrat. Because Shimotsuki's character arc with regard to the Sybil System was so different from Tsunemori's, with Shimotsuki devoted to the Sybil and Tsunemori rejecting them, Ubukata called the two an unlikely duo. During the making of Psycho-Pass 2, Ubukata and Shiotani decided on a color code for the new character lineup centering on Akane Tsunemori and the Sibyl System. "White" was Shimotsuki, and "black" was Tougane, with Kamui as "clear".

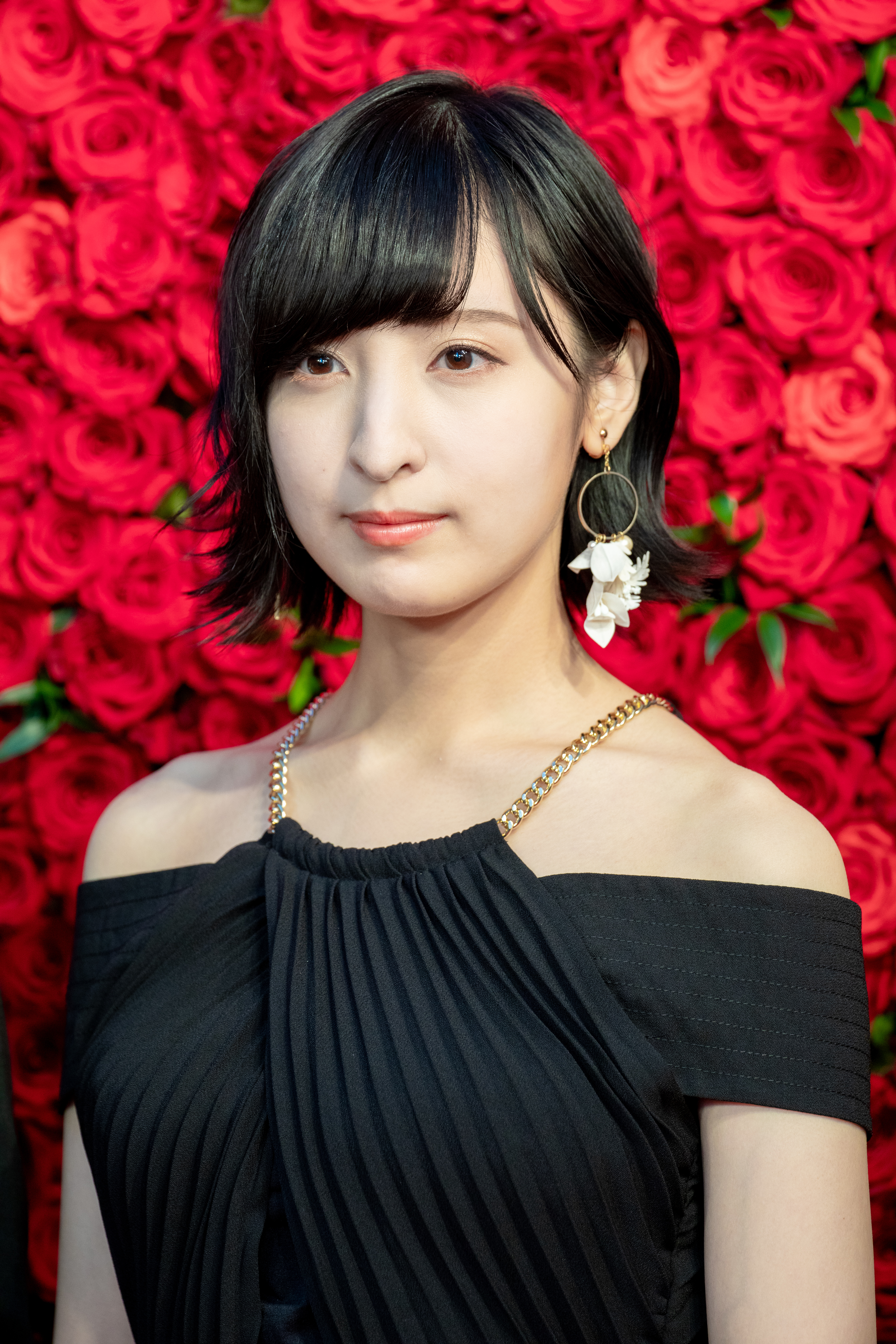
Ayane Sakura took a liking to the role of Mika Shimotsuki in Sinners of the System

For the first Sinners of the System film, Shiotani chose Nobuchika Ginoza and Mika Shimotsuki as the main characters because of their similarities to the protagonists of the first television series, Shinya Kogami and Akane Tsunemori respectively. But he noted that the new duo employed a different dynamic from Kogami and Akane, pointing out Ginoza's notable character arc across the previous projects related to Psycho-Pass, due mainly to his relationship with Masaoka and Kogami.

Voice actress Ayane Sakura believed Shimotsuki became more suited to the role of heroine as a result of her experience in the second television series, where she was the youngest main character. Once the first film premiered, Shiotani said of the trilogy that it would "broaden [the audience's] perspective. They're those kinds of movies". Regarding Shimotsuki's characterization, Sakura considered that Shimotsuki was still the same high school student from the original 2012 series, which explained her ongoing bad attitude. Sakura also noted Shimotsuki's informal treatment of Tsunemori. But on reading the script for Sinners of the System, Sakura found Shimotsuki's behavior gentler, and felt that this reflected her greater maturity. Fellow voice actor Kenji Nojima (Ginoza) responded similarly to Sakura's role, noting that Shimotsuki's traits were more upbeat than in Psycho-Pass 2. After recording the film, Sakura described the trilogy and Shimotsuki's character arc as amazing. Sakura was surprised by the way her character was handled, and how Ginoza started looking after her based on his own arc. Of her role in Psycho-Pass 3, Sakura noted that Shimotsuki would do anything for the sake of justice, even if she faces criticism as a result.

Cherami Leigh voices Mika Shimotsuki in English.

== Reception ==
Since Mika Shimotsuki's debut in Psycho-Pass 2, critical response to the character has been mixed. In the sequel, Anime News Network found her to be different from her original Psycho-Pass traits, citing her mistreatment of Enforcers such as Nobuchika Ginoza, and also speculated that the character might have a crush on Yayoi Kunizuka, as Shimotsuki tends to favor her instead. Kotaku enjoyed how different Shimotsuki's characterization was from Tsunemori's, as the two characters act in opposite ways when learning of the nature of the Sybil System, and observed that Shimotsuki "is still able to force herself to follow a device completely made up of criminal minds—able to convince herself that it is a perfectly wonderful idea that makes total sense despite the obvious contradictions". Anime News Network panned Shimotsuki as an unlikable supporting character, saying that she remains the same regardless of undergoing major change of mind in the narrative. Otaku USA described Shimotsuki's actions in the 2015 movie as "blind arrogance". The Fandom Post regarded Shimotsuki as a "too divisive character to say the least", commenting on the way she is used by Togane to attack Tsunemori. It said that Shimotsuki was "a really unlikeable co-protagonist due to the fact whilst she has her own views, she always gets into trouble and never seems to accept that it is her fault", and drew negative parallels with Akane Tsunemori's arc from the original series, saying that while Tsunemori often has detractors, she still manages to become more appealing due to her screentime. UK Anime Network said that, while Shimotsuki did not come across as likable, she is made more sympathetic by the difficulties she faces as a result of Togane and Sybil's manipulations. Anime News Network wrote that, despite her minor role in the 2015 movie, Shimotsuki's traits remained unlikable because of her hatred and informal manners whenever interacting with Tsunemori, which meant that viewers who had not watched the second series still understood the film.

The response to Shimotsuki's actions in following appearances has been more positive. Anime News Network praised Shimotsuki's role in Sinners of the System for the way she gains depth and becomes heroic while dealing with the antagonists. All Time Anime had a similar reaction, saying Shimotsuki comes across as a more likable character. TheCinemaholic found Shimotsuki a more entertaining character in Psycho-Pass 3, citing the tsundere traits she displays when dealing with her underlings. Anime News Network noted that there was a balance of power between the two types of crime-fighting organizations due to Shimotsuki being the leader of Unit One. Using the analogy that "Mika's Public Safety Bureau team is the FBI while Frederica's Ministry of Foreign Affairs team is the CIA", it said that the Ministry of Foreign Affairs team's handling of the situation makes Shimotsuki's anger reasonable. Biggest in Japan found Shimotsuki's actions in First Inspector comical, based on her reactions to events in the final moments of the film.
