= Psycho-Pass 3 =

Season of television series

- Key visual of the series
- Created by: Gen Urobuchi
- Anime television series
- Directed by: Naoyoshi Shiotani
- Produced by: Akitoshi Mori; Fumi Morihiro; Taka Yoshizawa
- Written by: Tow Ubukata; Makoto Fukami; Ryō Yoshigami
- Music by: Yugo Kanno
- Studio: Production I.G
- Licensed by: Prime Video (streaming); Crunchyroll
- Original network: Fuji TV (Noitamina)
- Original run: October 24, 2019 – December 12, 2019
- Episodes: 8
- Manga
- Written by: Saru Hashino
- Published by: Shueisha
- Magazine: Shōnen Jump+
- Original run: October 26, 2019 – August 28, 2021
- Volumes: 4
- Manga

First Inspector
- Written by: Saru Hashino
- Published by: Shueisha
- Magazine: Shōnen Jump+
- Original run: October 30, 2021 – July 30, 2022
- Preceded by
- Psycho-Pass (2012–2013); Psycho-Pass 2 (2014)
- icon

Psycho-Pass 3 is a 2019 anime television series that serves as a direct sequel to the 2014 anime television series Psycho-Pass 2 and the de facto third season of the Psycho-Pass anime series. It aired in Japan's Fuji TV's Noitamina from October 24 to December 12, 2019. It was first revealed in March 2019. Besides featuring characters from previous series, Psycho-Pass and Psycho-Pass 2, the anime focuses on new characters including Yūki Kaji's Arata Shindo and Yūichi Nakamura's Kei Mikhail Ignatov with Akira Amano having conceived their designs. Naoyoshi Shiotani returns to direct the series at Production I.G. Set in a dystopian future where society is overseen by technology known as the Sibyl System, the story focuses on Shindo and Ignatov, two policemen.

Director Naoyoshi Shiotani conceived the series in 2015 when coming up with a Psycho-Pass series that primarily relies on a new cast. Much attention was provided to the new main duo a well as the series' social commentary in regards to immigrants in Japan. The series was adapted into a manga and was followed by the movie sequel Psycho-Pass 3: First Inspector (2020) which closes the main arc. Critical response to the series was largely positive for the handling of several themes and dynamic of Shindo and Ignatov.

== Plot ==
The Public Safety Bureau assigns newly appointed agents Arata Shindo and Kei Mikhail Ignatov to Unit One, now led by Mika Shimotsuki. The Enforcers, consisting of Tenma Todoroki, Kazumichi Irie, Mao Kisaragi, and Sho Hinakawa, meet them and are surprised by how Arata is able to investigate people through his Mental Trace. During the story, Unit One investigates a case involving idol Karina Komiya who is voted as the new Governor of Tokyo. As they track criminals trying to kill her, Unit One meet the Suppressing Action Department of the Foreign Affairs Operations Department, a branch overseeing international crimes such as smuggling and terrorism. Led by Frederica Hanashiro, the Ministry give the protagonists information about criminals labeled as foxes from the secret criminal organization Bifrost.

During the investigation of a cult, Ignatov and Kisarage are kidnapped by its leader, who is the son of a Bifrost member. Ignatov's wife, Maiko Maya Stronskaya, is taken hostage too. As the leader aims to exploit Ignatov, he is instead murdered by Maiko. This causes Maiko to become a latent criminal and is kept hidden from her life. In the outcome, Bifrost is reduced to three members who have been plotting against each other too with Shindo's late father revealed to be one of them. Unit One joins forces with the Ministry to stop Bifrost and Shindo is chosen as Komiya's bodyguard, fearing her to be the next target. Ignatov meets Shizuka Homura from Bifrost who offers his wife's recovery at the cost of his aid. Meanwhile, former inspector Akane Tsunemori remains imprisoned for an unknown crime but claims that she chose Shindo as her successor to solve a crime as both of them are immune to the Sybil System's value. The series ends on a cliffhanger as Koichi Azusawa from Bifrost arranges a car accident to attack former Unit One member Yayoi Kunizuka. The series' plot continues in the film Psycho-Pass 3: First Inspector.

== Production ==
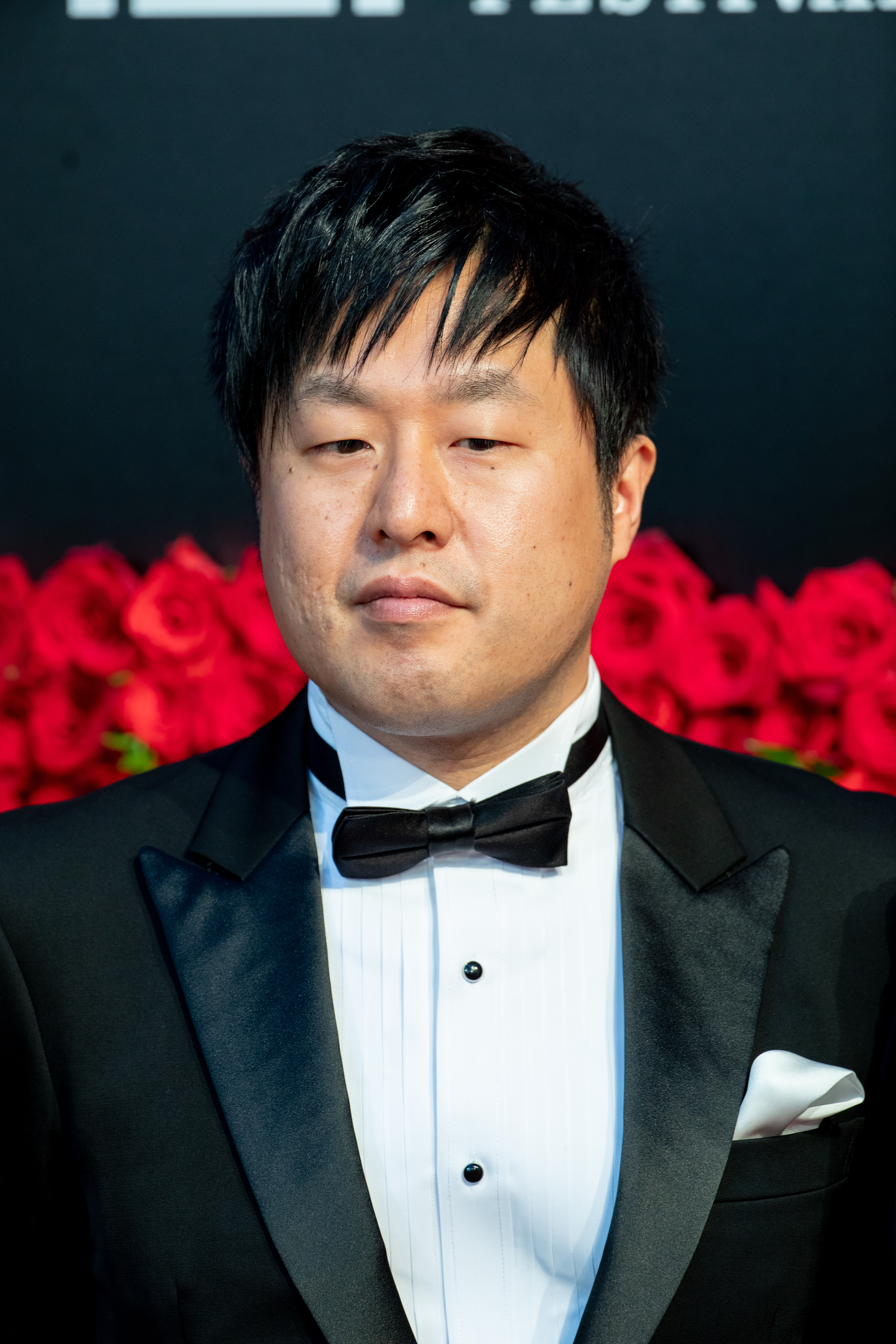
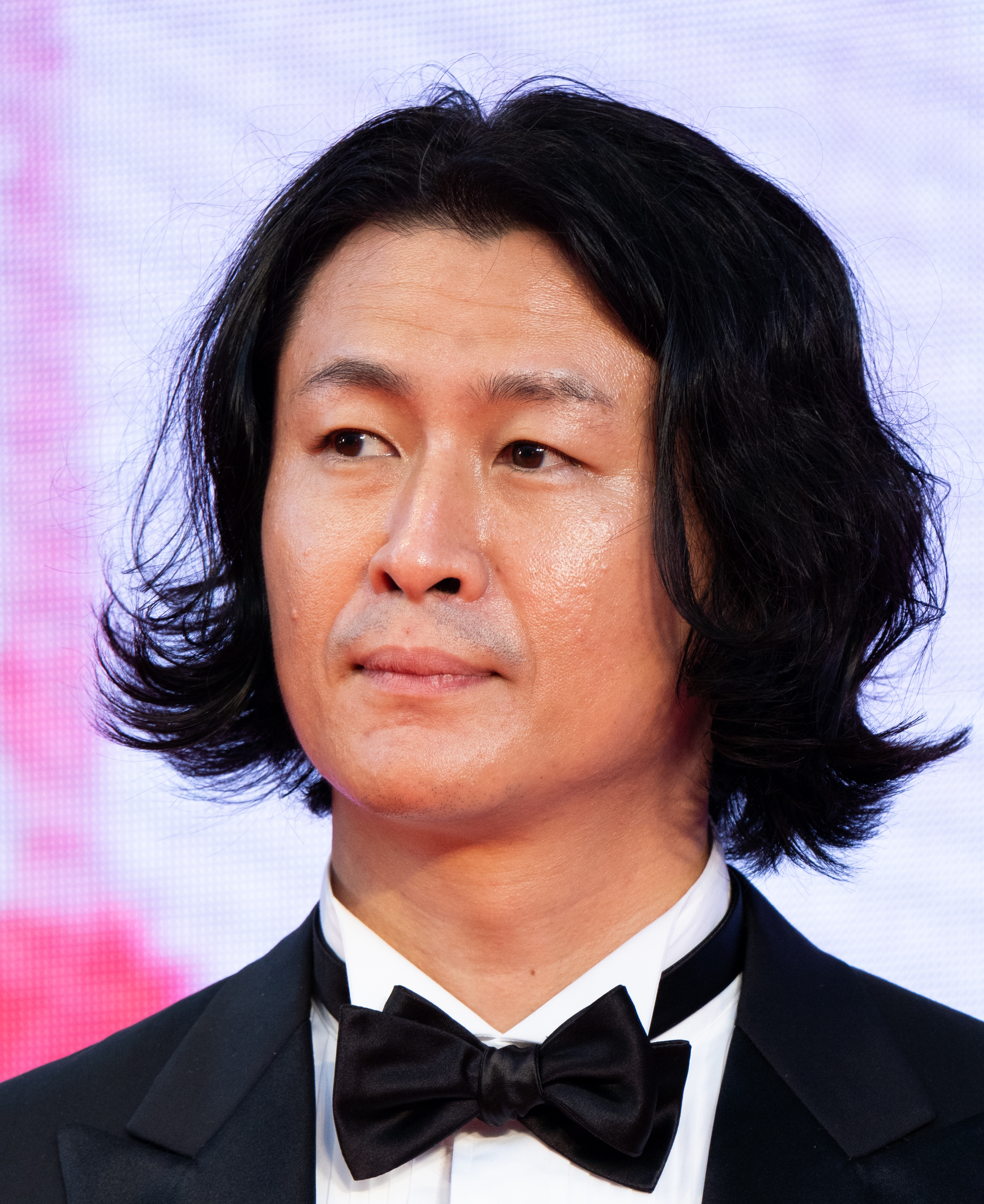
Naoyoshi Shiotani (left) and Tow Ubukata returned to respectively direct and write Psycho-Pass 3

Director Naoyoshi Shiotani came up with the idea of Psycho Pass 3 in 2015 after productions of the series' 2015 film, Psycho-Pass: The Movie, was made. The director claimed the franchise should use new characters for the sequel Psycho-Pass 3 and the 2019 film trilogy Psycho-Pass: Sinners of the System was created to fill gap between the movie and the third television series. The trilogy was also a test case for Psycho-Pass 3 in terms of production. Shiotani entrusted the writers Tow Ubukata, Makoto Fukami and Ryō Yoshigami with handling the new cast. Fukami and Yoshikami wrote the script while Ubukata was in charge of the composition. Fukami was surprised with the ongoing dynamic between Shiotani and Ubukata as despite the new story sharing a new cast, the series still felt like Psycho-Pass.

=== Scenario and themes ===
He clarified that every episode of the new series should be based on a different theme based on Ubukata's writing and there are a few characters not included in the original series composition that were added later on. Special attention was given to Shindo's characterization because he could easily come across as an unlikable character based on how he controls conversations but is also still caring. Ubukata wanted the two main characters to be written solely by Fukami. Since it was composed of three parts, economics, politics, and religion, the acoustic staff said, "Each one is like a movie version." Shiotani was able to create a composition with three themes and stick to the acoustic composition that can only be achieved with the 60-minute format. The sound team gave us finish on a tight schedule. Although the series is centered in a future Japan, Shiotani wanted to depict the issues from the modern Japan, most notably the poor treatment given to immigrants.

Yūki Kaji voiced Shindo in the series. Upon seeing his character for the first time, Kaji found him stylish. Kaji was overjoyed when he got the role of Shindo during the audition, having watched the previous Psycho-Pass works and being a fan of them. Kaji enjoyed the character's relationship with Ignatov due to their close relationship and Shindo's style of interacting with the characters from previous seasons. Kaji laughed when first reading the script because he found the cast unique and looked forward to the characters' growth during the series. He had mixed feelings about Shindo wielding the Dominator due to the violence it can cause.

Ignatov's voice actor, Yūichi Nakamura, also enjoyed the dynamic between Shindo and his character and wished the two were brothers. The handling of the characters' relationships with their underlings also appealed to him. Nakamura had no clear understanding of Shindo and Ignatov because their pasts are not explored in the early episodes and he looked forward to the development of the series.

=== Release ===
The series was first announced in March 2019 by the official website of Psycho-Pass, claiming it would air on Fuji TV's Noitamina programming block. Outside of Japan, the series made its debut on Amazon Prime Video, revealing a total of eight episodes, each one being 45 minutes long. Crunchyroll began streaming the series on July 11, 2023; an English dub premiered on June 24, 2025.

The opening theme is "Q-vism" by Who-ya Extended. Who-ya Extended was very proud that his work can be involved in these historical works as the theme song. He mentioned "Q-vism" gives mysterious feeling of gratitude and a sense of responsibility continues. He sang with respect for the series that has been spun so far, and the expectations for this new work. Lastly, he envisioned determination into the feeling of loneliness and speed hoping to reach as many people as a possible. The ending theme is "bullet" by Cö shu Nie. Miku Nakamura from the band said she was a fan of Psycho-Pass herself and was honored to do thing theme. The rudder was held by themselves. They had a distorted "bullet" that can be released at any time.

The series was released in for DVD and Blu-ray volume from January 22 to April 15, 2020. A manga adaptation of the series written by Saru Hashino was serialized in Shueisha's Shonen Jump+ website and app from October 30, 2019, to August 28, 2021. A manga adaptation of the First Inspector was serialized in the same website and app from October 30, 2021, to July 30, 2022. Following the anime's cliffhanger finale, Production I.G produced a film, Psycho-Pass 3: First Inspector, released in 2020. The cast's image was used to produce clothing by the suit brand Difference, which is produced by Konaka Co.

== Episodes ==
No. overall	No. in season	Title	Original release date
34	1	"Laelaps' Calling"; Transliteration: "Rairapusu no shōmei" (Japanese: ライラプスの召命)	October 24, 2019
A transport drone crashes into a harbor and the passengers, most of whom are immigrants, are detained on the wharf. The Public Safety Bureau assigns newly-appointed agents, Arata Shindo and Kei Mikhail Ignatov, to investigate the crash. The Enforcers, consisting of Tenma Todoroki, Kazumichi Irie, Mao Kisaragi, and Sho Hinakawa, arrive. Shindo, Kisaragi and Hinakawa leave to investigate the drone while Ignatov, Todoroki and Irie stay behind to assess the immigrants. Shindo discovers that a passenger named Rick Fellows remains unaccounted for. Shindo uses his Mental Trace ability to mentally reconstruct Fellows' movements and realizes that he was sucked out of the plane when the cargo ramp opened. Fellows' body is later found in the harbor. Shindo and Ignatov suspect foul play on the part of Fellows' employer, Hyper Transport. The next day, Chief Mika Shimotsuki approves an unofficial investigation under the guise of filing a safety report. After speaking with Fellows' wife, Adele, Shindo finds records that implicate Hyper Transport executives Takumi Yonehara and Tetsuya Sasagawa. Shizuka Homura joins Haruki Shirogane and Kyoko Saionji as a Congressman of Bifrost, a secret criminal organization whose gambling "game" Roundrobin affects real world events and decides to short sell Hyper Transport's stock to crash the company. Elsewhere, former Inspector Akane Tsunemori hopes that Shindo and Ignatov will be the ones to find the "unseen enemy."
35	2	"Teumessian Sacrifices"; Transliteration: "Teumesosu no ikenie" (Japanese: テウメソスの生贄)	October 31, 2019
Shindo and Ignatov deduce that Fellows' murderer was able to keep their Hue clear by causing Fellows to commit suicide. They also realize that the data Fellows provides is proof that Takumi and Tetsuya are involved in an illegal subprime lending scheme. Yonehara panics at an audit, raising his Psycho-Pass to criminal levels. Detecting Takumi's Psycho-Pass, Public Safety deploys with Ignatov, Todoroki and Irie entering a Forbidden Zone called Myogadani to confront a gang leader. Ignatov's martial arts ability and a relay-powered Dominator quell the gang, but Yonehara is already dead. Shindo and Ignatov pursue Sasagawa but are stopped by Shinya Kogami and Nobuchika Ginoza, who are revealed to be working for the Ministry of Foreign Affairs. Sasagawa is apprehended by Frederica Hanashiro and Teppei Sugo. Bifrost accepts the sacrifice of Sasagawa in order to keep the Sibyl System off their trail. Tsunemori continues to observe events and await her "judgment," when society's true nature will be revealed to all. The next day, Shindo and Ignatov are assigned to investigate the accidental death of Kojo Tsuchiya. Shindo determines that Tsuchiya did not commit suicide, making foul play a possibility. Investigating further, Shindo and Ignatov discover that Tsuchiya was head psychologist for gubernatorial candidate Karina Komiya, leading them to investigate both her and her political rival, Kosuke "Herakles" Yakushiji. Shindo interviews Komiya, who reveals that she accused Tsuchiya of being a stalker. After she leaves, Shindo suggests that she has hidden mentalist abilities.
36	3	"Herakles and the Sirens"; Transliteration: "Herakuresu to seirēn" (Japanese: ヘラクレスとセイレーン)	November 7, 2019
Bifrost begins their next Roundrobin manipulation of events, which involves the outcome of the Tokyo gubernatorial race. Ignatov interviews Yakushiji, who is currently trailing in the race and is uncooperative. Bifrost agent Koichi Azusawa is activated. Shindo uses his Mental Trace on Komiya and determines that Komiya is hiding something before he collapses from severe side effects. Shimotsuki allows the team to continue the investigation under the pretext of anti-terrorism. They question Yakushiji's secretary, Lee Aki, after discovering that he tried to make contact with Tsuchiya. Aki, however, is assassinated before he can talk and only one of the assassins is apprehended. Irie leads the team into Myogadani, where he grew up, and uses his contacts to reach Haruki Enomiya, the underground leader there. Enomiya is the lead suspect, but the team has no evidence to prove his involvement. Later, while questioning Yakushiji's staff, Tenma Todoroki's stepbrother Haruma insults Tenma. Ignatov punches Haruma in the face and is subsequently suspended. The Enforcers then learn that Shindo's mother was euthanized, his father committed suicide and that Ignatov's brother was murdered by Shindo's father. Todoroki recalls his own family's dark history. The next day, Shimotsuki assigns ex-Enforcer and current investigative journalist, Yayoi Kunizuka, to assist Unit One in Ignatov's absence.
37	4	"Political Strife in the Colosseum"; Transliteration: "Korosseo no seisō" (Japanese: コロッセオの政争)	November 14, 2019
Kunizuka informs the team that she has determined Aki's murderers were smuggled in from Myogadani while in suspended animation to prevent Sibyl's scanners detecting their Hues. Shindo investigates Tsuchiya's lab and discovers an AI entity which Tsuchiya left behind. It explains that Tsuchiya had developed an AI with highly persuasive speech and voice patterns. He used it to create an identical hologram copy of Karina Komiya called Ma-Karina. Shindo concludes that Komiya is using Ma-Karina to aid her campaign, placing her in danger. The team receives intelligence that Enomiya is planning to attack the political debate between Komiya and Yakushiji. Komiya is kidnapped but with Unit One's intervention and Ignatov's help, Komiya is rescued. Azusawa kills Enomiya, making it appear as an elevator malfunction. Afterwards, Komiya is elected the governor of Tokyo despite Ma-Karina being exposed and Ignatov is reinstated as an Inspector. Later, she privately meets with Shindo where he says he voted for her, and she explains that Kojo Tsuchiya saw Ma-Karina as a surrogate for his murdered daughter.
38	5	"Agamemnon's Offering"; Transliteration: "Agamemunon no hansai" (Japanese: アガメムノンの燔祭)	November 21, 2019
Ignatov visits ex-Inspector Kira, whose partner was killed in a supposed auto accident. Kira warns Ignatov that they are investigating "Foxes," people who commit crimes without degrading their Hues and that such people have infiltrated the Public Safety Bureau. Governor Komiya organizes the Mitake Special Religious Zone which allows free practice of religion. However, the opening conference is attacked by a suicide bomber, taking the lives of innocents while Sasagawa is killed in an auto accident. The prime suspects behind the bombing are religious leaders, as well as Immigration Bureau observer Kurisu Kyoji O'Brien. Ignatov's team meets Torri S. Aschenbach, leader of the religious group Heaven's Leap, who tells them that their founder, Nisei, has not been seen for six months. Shindo's team learns that Sister Theresa Shinogi, another religious leader, had connections with Shindo's father. They then find the medical drone responsible for implanting the bomb inside the suicide bomber and discover it has performed the procedure five times over. The second bomber kills O'Brien. Since the drone was purchased by Shinogi and she had met O'Brien the night before, the team searches her compound. They surmise that Aschenbach, Shinogi and a third religious leader named Joseph Auma are all involved in a massive smuggling ring and that the special zone would have exposed their activities, giving them reason to sabotage its formation. They arrest Aschenbach's uncle and his wife, Viktor and Vera Zaharias, and arrange for Ignatov and Kisaragi to impersonate the Zaharias couple in an undercover operation.
39	6	"Caesar's Gold Coins"; Transliteration: "Kaesaru no kinka" (Japanese: カエサルの金貨)	November 28, 2019
Ignatov and Kisaragi successfully infiltrate the Heaven's Leap sanctuary. Shindo goes to question Auma, but the team discovers that he sacrificed himself to stop the third suicide bomber from murdering immigrants he had rescued from an illegal prostitution ring. They also uncover a cache of illegal gun parts. Ignatov and Kisaragi learn that each of the suicide bombers had been treated in Heaven's Leap's sanctuary with a Hue treatment called "Eternal White." Bifrost continues to manipulate events although Homura bets that Public Safety will succeed. One of Irie's contacts reveals rumors that quality Japanese-made gun parts are being exported. Aschenbach discovers the undercover operation and captures Ignatov and Kisaragi, then reveals that he is the son of Bifrost member, Saionji. Shindo suspects that Shinogi is using her rental car company to smuggle goods and, possibly, the suicide bombers. They then receive a call from Shinogi warning them about the fourth bomber, but Todoroki kills him despite Shindo's orders to take him alive. Shindo deduces that both Shinogi and Auma were trying to prevent the bombings. Foreign Affairs tries to stop the investigation because they have already infiltrated Heaven's Leap. Zaharias is killed by the fifth suicide bomber before Foreign Affairs can take custody of him. Shindo surmises the bombings are part of a plot concocted by O'Brien, Nisei, Shinogi and Auma to expose the corruption in Japan's immigration system, but someone preempted their plan. Following a Mental Trace, Shindo concludes that O'Brien faked his death and is the mastermind behind the bombings. Meanwhile, Ignatov's wife Maiko Maya Stronskaya is kidnapped by Heaven's Leap.
40	7	"Don't take God's name in vain"	December 5, 2019
Aschenbach threatens to harm Stronskaya in an attempt to extract information from Ignatov about the Public Safety Bureau. Shindo determines that O'Brien is being used by Aschenbach, and they need to apprehend both O'Brien and Shinogi to rescue the undercover team. They find Shinogi who confirms the existence of the plan between herself, O'Brien, Auma, and Nisei to help immigrants. Shinogi reveals that Atsushi Shindo opposed the plan which was subsequently hijacked by Bifrost, but then she is assassinated by a sniper. An unknown party helps Ignatov escape his cell and he then helps Kisaragi escape, but they are recaptured. Kisaragi warns Shindo about Ignatov and Stronskaya's plight. Shindo realizes that O'Brien created a sixth bomber to eliminate the one target they missed - Komiya. The Sibyl System authorizes a raid on Heaven's Leap and Ginoza and Sugo, who are operating undercover, help Ignatov escape once more. Chief Shimotsuki leads the raid with Unit Two while Shindo goes to protect Komiya. Shindo intercepts O'Brien, who has turned himself into the sixth bomber, and convinces him not to blow himself up, although he soon dies from the cancer imbedded within him. Aschenbach takes Stronskaya hostage to escape, but she easily disarms and kills him. Meanwhile, Saionji is disintegrated by Bifrost after her illegal interference in the Roundrobin is revealed by Shirogane, leaving Shirogane and Homura as the last Congressmen of Bifrost. Later, Chief Shimotsuki examines Shindo's Psycho-Pass records and realizes that Shindo is criminally asymptomatic. The Sibyl System tells Tsunemori that they plan to add Shindo to their ranks, but Shimotsuki is confident Shindo and Ignatov will uncover their real adversary.
41	8	"Cubism"	December 12, 2019
Kisaragi admits to Ignatov that she was manipulated by Azusawa into facilitating the car crash with Kira and his partner. Kunizuka returns to interview Unit One to record a documentary about their team. Public Safety meets with Foreign Affairs who explains that Bifrost appears to consist of Congressmen who lead the organization, Inspectors who are their direct subordinates, and Foxes who are civilians manipulated into doing their bidding. Kogami theorizes that Bifrost fears being discovered by Sibyl and so they still seek the death of Komiya. Foreign Affairs decides to deal with the Peacebreakers, a foreign terrorist group affiliated with Bifrost, while Shindo protects Komiya and Ignatov hunts down Azusawa. Ignatov has issues with Shindo and the rest of the unit because of the delay in getting his wife Stronskaya released from therapy. While trying to trap Azusawa, Ignatov encounters Homura who asks Ignatov to protect him from Shirogane and Azusawa who plan to eliminate him. Homura offers to arrange Stronskaya's release in exchange for his help and Ignatov reluctantly agrees, however Kogami witnesses them discussing the deal. Shindo arrests Azusawa's partner and computer expert, Chiyo Obata. Stronskaya is released from therapy and she tries to mend the rift in Shindo and Ignatov's relationship. Meanwhile, Azusawa arranges for Kunizuka's car to be crushed by building materials dropped from a crane, leaving her survival uncertain.

== Home media release ==
Japanese

Name	Date	Discs	Episodes
Volume 1	January 22, 2020	1	1–2
Volume 2	February 19, 2020	1	3–4
Volume 3	March 18, 2020	1	5–6
Volume 4	April 15, 2020	1	7–8

== Reception ==
Psycho-Pass 3 has received better treatment than its immediate predecessor with focus given for the new characters and a script that tackled such modern day topics as immigration, corporate financial mismanagement and genetic manipulation. Despite being the third television series involving the Psycho-Pass series, Anime News Network found it accessible due to how the cast react to Sybil System while quickly establishing its status quo, finding the pilot "solid". Comic Book Resources regarded the series at delivering appealing sci-fi action to returning fans by delivering both new protagonists who stand out despite the fame of previous heroes. CinemaHolic enjoyed how the series focuses on multiple cases that appear to be connected while also exploring not only the new cast but also returning.

Ninotaku found him to be a well-developed character because he fits with the other characters created by Gen Urobuchi, especially Akane Tsunemori. Kila from Sequential Planet noted that the usage of new protagonists was a risky move for the franchise due to the popularity of Kogami and Tsunemori. Nevertheless, she believed that both Shindo and Ignatov were likable characters, enjoying the former the most for how his cheerful personality stood in high contrast to the dark narrative. Due to the focus the duo is given, the reviewer believed Shindo and Ignatov managed to be Kogami and Tsunemori's successors. Shindo and Ignatov's roles were praised by TheCinemaHolic due to how they fit within the supporting characters and brief elements from the past lives imply further depths such as the latter being a victim of xenophobia. Shindo was also praised by Anime News Network because his mentalist skill adds a new element to investigation and gives the series an air of mystery.

There was comment in regards to the anime's ending. Although Anime News Network was disappointed by the lack of closure for the returning cast, the focus given on Shindo and Ignatov earned positive responses for the build up they are given in terms or not whether they will betray one another. As Ignatov is the primary subject of this, the website claims he has a bigger character arc than his best friend. Since the television series ends on a cliffhanger there were multiple mysteries in regards to the cast that website Comic Book Resources look forward to be resolved in First Inspector. The Cinema Holic was more critical, finding the experience "incomplete" as a result of the narrative not reaching a proper ending and relying on the movie sequel.

The series also won the "Best Mechanical Design" award from Newtype.
