= Psycho-Pass: Sinners of the System =

Production I.G film trilogy

- Poster of the films
- Created by: Production I.G; Naoyoshi Shiotani
- Anime film

Case 1: Crime and Punishment
- Directed by: Naoyoshi Shiotani
- Produced by: Akitoshi Mori; Masaya Saitou; Fumi Morihiro; Hiroe Nakahara
- Written by: Ryō Yoshigami
- Music by: Yugo Kanno
- Studio: Production I.G
- Licensed by: NA: Crunchyroll; UK: Anime Limited
- Released: January 25, 2019
- Runtime: 60 minutes
- Anime film

Case 2: First Guardian
- Directed by: Naoyoshi Shiotani
- Produced by: Akitoshi Mori; Masaya Saitou; Fumi Morihiro; Hiroe Nakahara
- Written by: Makoto Fukami
- Music by: Yugo Kanno
- Studio: Production I.G
- Licensed by: NA: Crunchyroll; UK: Anime Limited
- Released: February 15, 2019
- Runtime: 60 minutes
- Anime film

Case 3: On the Other Side of Love and Hate
- Directed by: Naoyoshi Shiotani
- Produced by: Akitoshi Mori; Masaya Saitou; Fumi Morihiro; Hiroe Nakahara
- Written by: Makoto Fukami
- Music by: Yugo Kanno
- Studio: Production I.G
- Licensed by: NA: Crunchyroll; UK: Anime Limited
- Released: March 8, 2019
- Runtime: 68 minutes

Psycho-Pass: Sinners of the System, also shortened to Psycho-Pass SS, is a trilogy of Japanese anime films based on characters who appear in the Psycho-Pass television series. The trilogy was first announced in 2018 and the films were released by Production I.G in Japan in early 2019 full under direction of Naoyoshi Shiotani. The films stars the talents of Ayane Sakura, Hiroki Touchi, Kana Hanazawa, Kenji Nojima, Kinryū Arimoto, Tomokazu Seki among others. In 2023 Crunchyroll released an English dub of the films that starred Kate Oxley, Robert McCollum, Jessie James Grelle, Cherami Leigh, Lindsay Seidel, Mike McFarland and more.

The first film, Case.1 Crime and Punishment (罪と罰, Tsumi to Batsu), focuses on Reinforcer Nobuchika Ginoza and Inspector Mika Shimotsuki as they investigate a prison filled with people living in cheerful life. The second film, Case.2 First Guardian, focuses on Tomomi Masaoka and Teppei Sugo as how they met following the death of Sugo's friends. The third and final film, On the Other Side of Love and Hate__ (恩讐の彼方に__, Case.3 Onshuu no Kanata ni) focuses on the mercenary Shinya Kogami as he continues his life in Eastern countries while training a young girl seeking for revenge. While different writers handled the three films, director Naoyoshi Shiotani worked on the three as he planned this trilogy with hints about the narrative for the third season, Psycho-Pass 3. In 2021 Anime Limited released the trilogy on Blu-ray in English regions. Then in 2022 Crunchyroll licensed the films and made it available for streaming. In March of 2023 an English dub was released by Crunchyroll for all 3 films.

Critical response to the movies have been generally positive based on the narrative's focus on the main character's minds, most notably Shimotsuki's growth in the first, the tragic elements in the second and Kogami's reflections in the third. The trilogy earned ¥378,636,200 in box office and the home media release also achieved good sales. Two novels and three manga adaptations were also published by Mag Garden.

== Plot ==
The three films feature backstories to characters who appear in Psycho-Pass television series.

=== Crime and Punishment ===
Enforcer Nobuchika Ginoza and inspector Mika Shimotsuki from Unit 1 find a traumatised woman and it is quickly apparent that a drug has altered her state of mind, Akane Tsunemori's team is directed to return her to a special experimental prison – the place where the woman worked as a therapist. Akane dispatches fellow inspector Shimotsuki along with two enforcers, Ginoza and Kunizuka, to investigate the prison while she and the rest of the team investigate the case in Tokyo. Through a new combination of drugs, therapy, and work, the prison has produced a different kind of society where latent criminal prisoners act in harmony with one another – keeping their criminal coefficients under 90 in most cases and carry out work valuable to society at large. Mika sees the woman as a criminal worthy of being killed but she and Ginoza realize that the woman used herself as bait to seek protection for a small child. Mika and Ginoza discover the warden is exploiting the prisoners to harvest nuclear waste that was buried beneath the prison, causing the prisoners to die of radiation. Mika records the warden's confession of her actions and reveals it to the prisoners. Mika then kills the warden, but the prisoners riot. Mika and Ginoza hunt down the rest of the complicit staff then begin working to protect the prisoners. They later find out the Sybil System knew of the warden's motive since the prison is located above the former dumping ground of the System's nuclear waste.

=== First Guardian ===
Enforcer Teppei Sugo, is a former respected military officer. He acted as the eye-in-the-sky air support for a ground squad of marines alongside Itsuki Otomo, another pilot and a communications officer. Together, they formed a tight military family, including Itsuki's wife Rin who was the squad's ground commander. The squad was sent on a military strike outside Japan, but Sugo loses Itsuki during the fight. Sugo is devastated by this loss and tortured over why he was ordered to abandon his squad mates. He is confronted by MWPSB officers Aoyanagi and Masaoka who inform him that he is a suspect in a terrorist attack that is apparently been performed by his MIA squad commander, Itsuki. They discover that the military was testing a bio weapon against the enemy, which also killed the rest of the strike team. Itsuki knew about the attack beforehand and left his memories in an android to extract vengeance, but it is stopped by the Bureau forces. Rin attempts to assassinate the military commander but he kills her instead. However, the Bureau marks the commanding officer for high psycho-pass and terminates him. Following these events, Sugo's level of stress increases and he eventually becomes an enforcer in the MWPSB.

=== On the Other Side of Love and Hate ===
Shinya Kogami travels the Tibet-Himalaya region as a freelance mercenary. He saves a bus-load of refugees from guerrillas, including a young half-Japanese girl, Tenzing Wangchuk. She asks him to teach her fighting skills so she can take revenge on the murderer of her parents. Kogami agrees, but warns her against walking down the path of revenge as he did in the past. He encounters Frederica Hanashiro of the Japanese Ministry of Foreign Affairs, ostensibly looking for kimin, Japanese who have been stranded outside the country with the aim of returning them home if they have a good hue. She assists Kogami to protect the refugees, but he is wounded and is saved by Garcia, a mercenary who formerly worked for UN peacekeepers. As Kogami recovers, he reflects on his past actions, of taking revenge by killing the criminal Shogo Makishima when abandoning Sybil. During peace negotiations, Tenzing tracks her father's killer to a meeting with Garcia who is secretly sabotaging the negotiations. He badly wounds her, but she informs Kogami of Garcia's plan. Frederica assists Kogami on the condition he works with her, so after he kills Garcia, he returns with her to Japan.

== Production ==
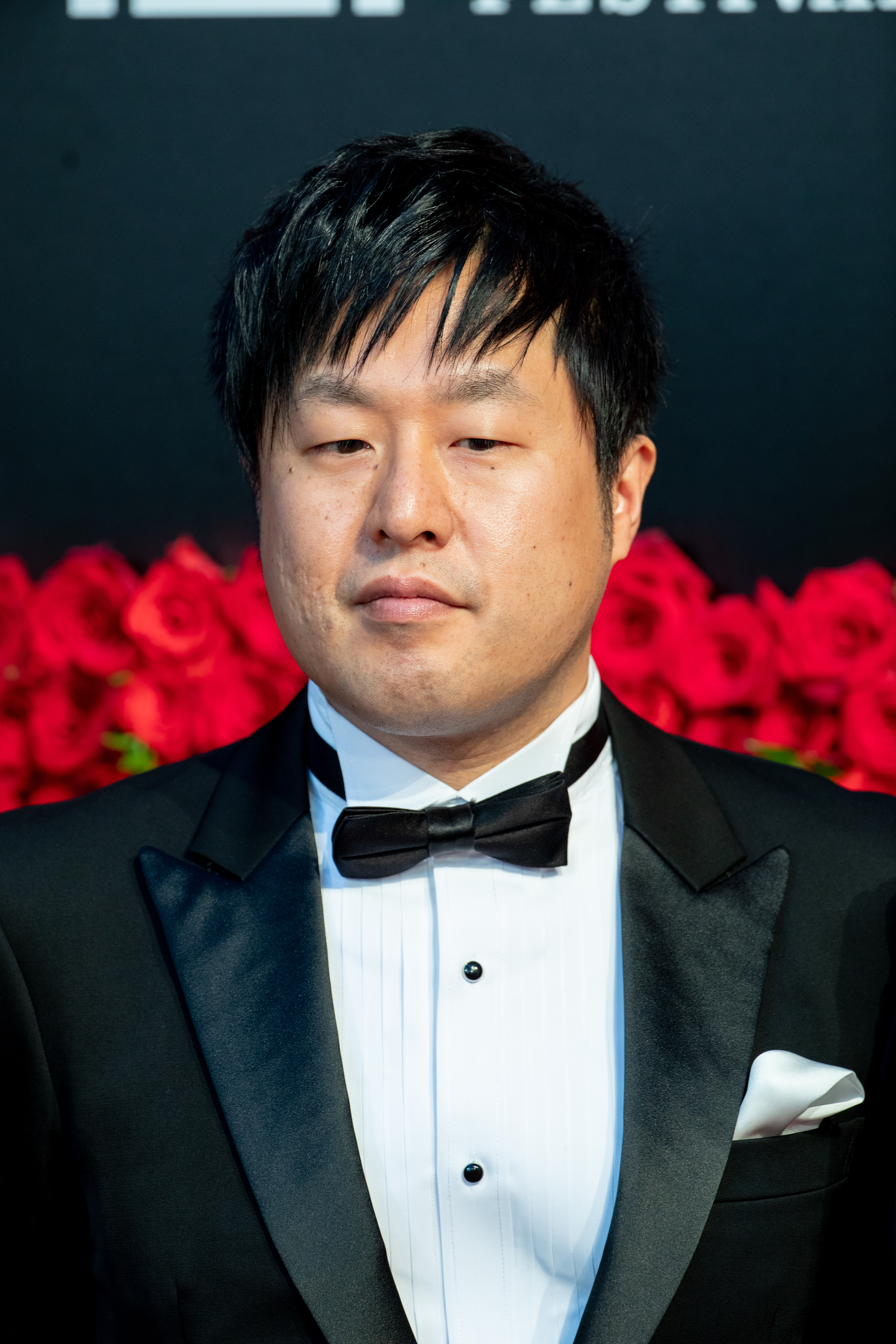
Director Naoyoshi Shiotani at the release of the first two films in the Tokyo International Film Festival 2018.

Naoyoshi Shiotani came up with the idea of making Sinners of the System after productions of the series' 2015 film, Psycho-Pass: The Movie, was made. The director claimed the franchise should use new characters for the sequel Psycho-Pass 3 and Sinners of the System was created to fill gap between the movie and the third television series. The trilogy was also a test case for Psycho-Pass 3 in terms of production. For Psycho-Pass, Shiotoani tried to portray the human drama thoroughly with an hour-long episode each, to make it like a live-action overseas drama. Each Sinners of the System was about 60 minutes each episode, but it was a hard challenge for the staff to make it instead of the usual 30 minute-episode of the television anime series. Production I.G had to put a lot of stuff together in terms of story composint the films, but despite the difficulties they had, they felt it was doing all the work since they moved forward on two sides at the same time by also using its production as a test case for third television series. The films were first announced in Japan by Fuji TV in March 2018.

Shiotani returned as the film's director, having already worked in the previous Psycho-Pass series. Novelist Ryō Yoshigami wrote the first film's script while the second one was written by Makoto Fukami. Shiotani spent time on pre-production. He wanted to combine the drama that the scriptwriter Fukami and Yoshigami wanted to draw with the drama that he had envisioned, so Shiotani asked them to write a lot of plots and screenplays.

Since all previous Psycho-Pass series were written from Akane Tsunemori's point of view, Shiotani wanted a new take on the franchise through to the trilogy. Through this, Shiotani wanted to explore relationships not seen before like Kogami's and Ginoza's as well as introduce characters who would play a major role. Additionally, the television series primarily focused on the Sybil System themes so Shiotani wanted to create stories perimarily centered around the characters.

From the beginning, Shitoani decided not to make a drama in Tokyo for the stage of each episode. Each of the three dramas is a complete drama, with variations. The director also wanted to change the overall color that colors the episode. In regards to the first film, Shiotani picked Nobuchika Ginoza and Mika Shimotsuki as the main characters due to their similarities to the protagonists from the first television series, Shinya Kogami and Akane Tsunemori, respectively. Nevertheless, he noted these duo employed a different dynamic from Kogami and Tsunemori while noting how Ginoza has undergone a notable character arc across the previous projects related to Psycho-Pass mainly due to his relationship with Masaoka and Kogami. While Case 1 was not difficult to create since Shimotsuki and Ginoza already interacted several times in the past, Case 2 had more issues since Masaoka and Sugo had no such connections in previous works. The film was meant to how Sugo volunteered to become a Reinforcer despite his good nature. Meanwhile, the character of Kogami was conceptualized as progressive hero by Shiotani due to how different is his first personality in contrast to his traits from the first television series. Through Sinners of the System, the director envisioned him as the main character who often interacts while showing the aftermath of his actions from Psycho-Pass: The Movie.

Tsunemori was noted by the fanbase to be noticeably absent from the films despite her high importance in the previous works. Shiotani joked that while Sinners of the System uses other characters as protagonist, he still decided to use Tsunemori's image instead to make a crossover collaboration with the 2018 film Godzilla: City on the Edge of Battle.

The first two movies had a prescreen in the Film Festival from late 2018 where Shiotani explained to the fans that the third title was still in development. Seki explained the voice acting for the third movie was completed in June 2018 though but still told the audience from the festival that he could break their expectations. Seki felt honored when reading the script from his movie, something which Nojima agreed with. The staff explained an idea they wanted to explore in the films was the long distanced friendship between Ginoza and Kogami as the two have been friends before the events of the first television series. The opening theme song for all films is remix of "Abnormalize" by Ling Tosite Sigure which is the opening theme for episodes 1 to 11 of the first season of the TV anime. The three respective ending themes for the three films are remixes of "Fallen", "All Alone With You" and "The Monster With No Name" (名前のない怪物, Namae no Nai Kaibutsu) which were originally made by the band Egoist. Masayuki Nakano was in charge of these remixes.

Natsuo Sai also wrote a manga based on the first two films. A concert, Psycho-Pass, was made in January 2019 in Shibyua in order to promote the trilogy while featuring tracks from Yugo Kanno and portrayal of the franchise's characters by the original voice actors. Two novels were also written in 2019, adapting the story from the trilogy.

=== Cast ===
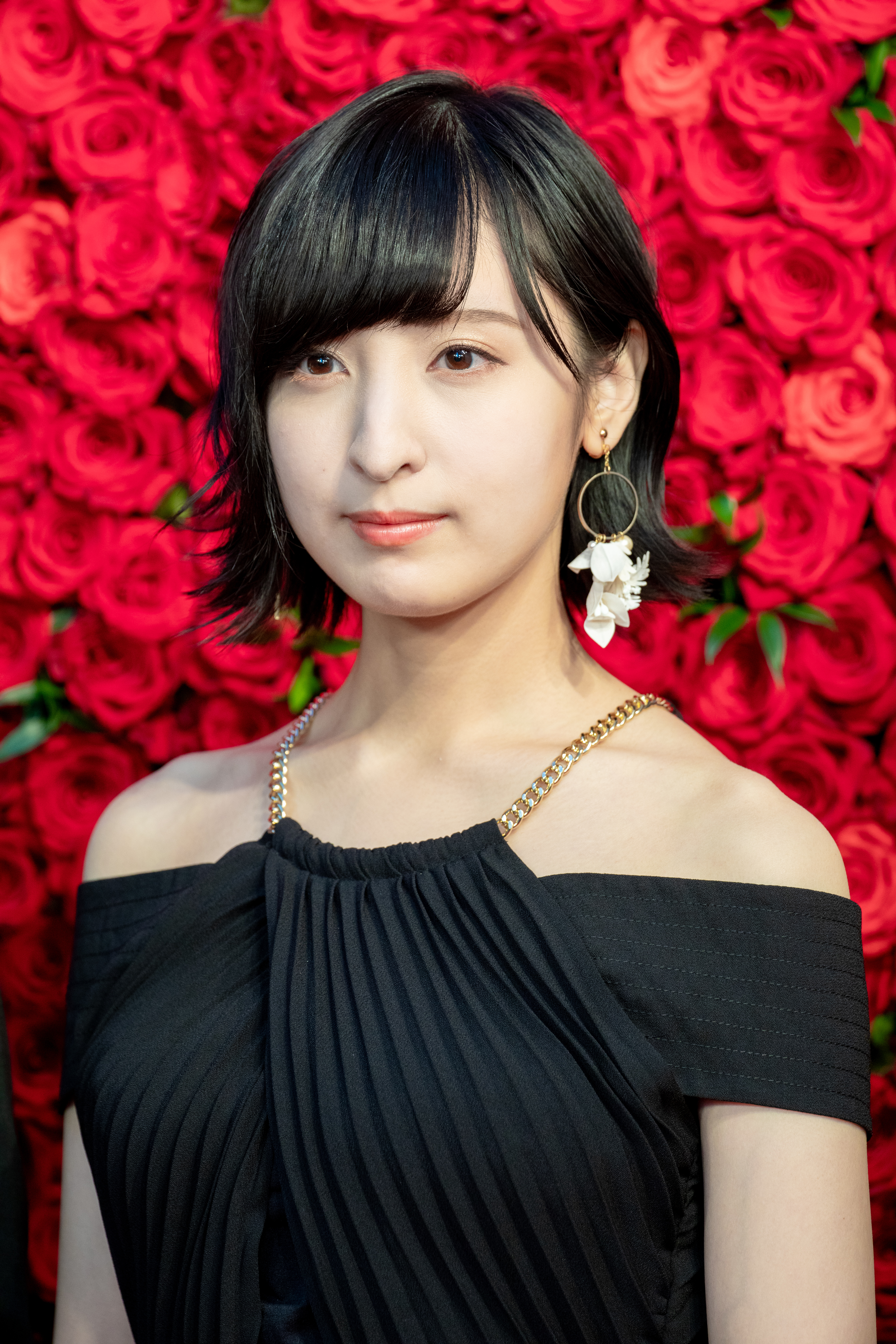
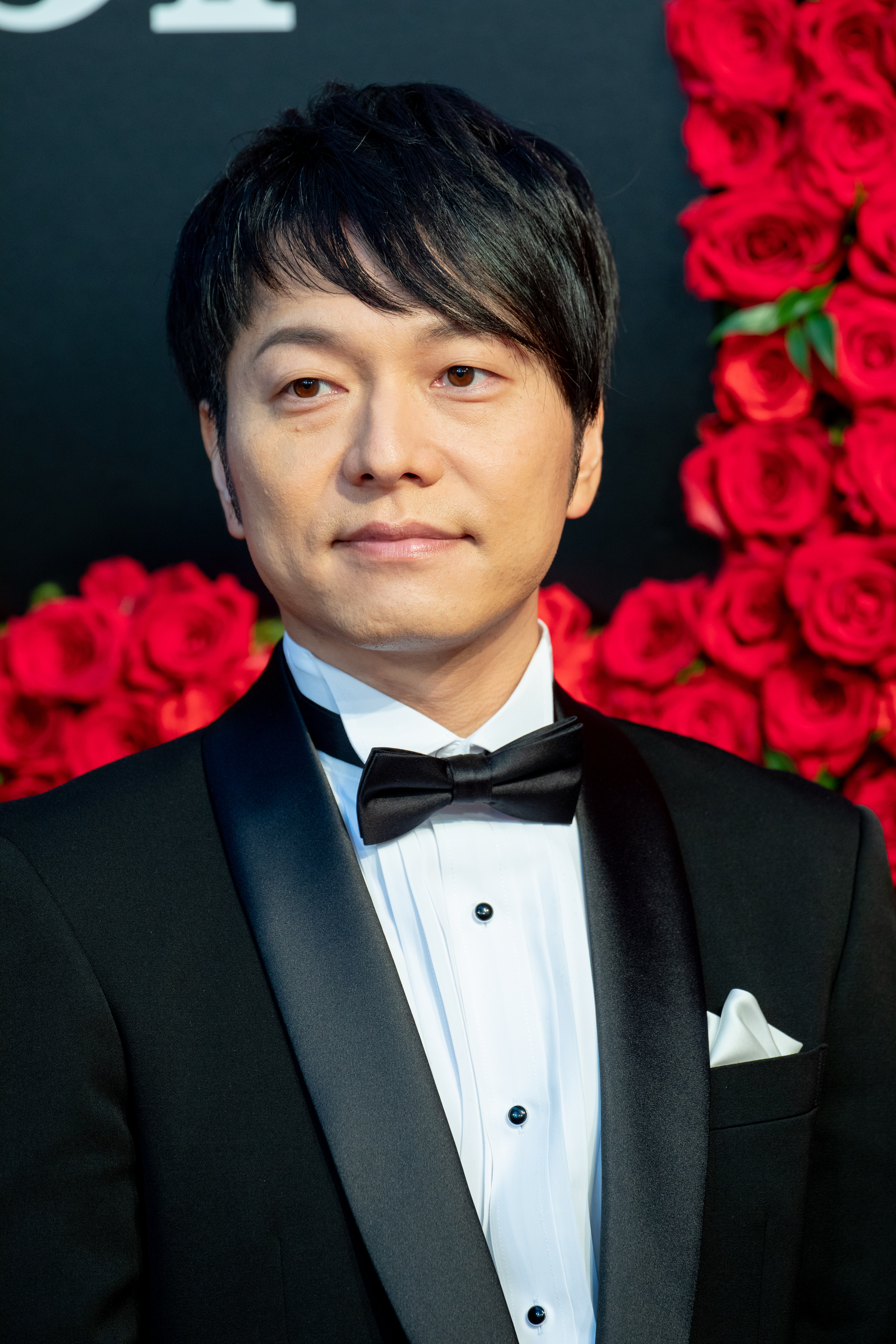
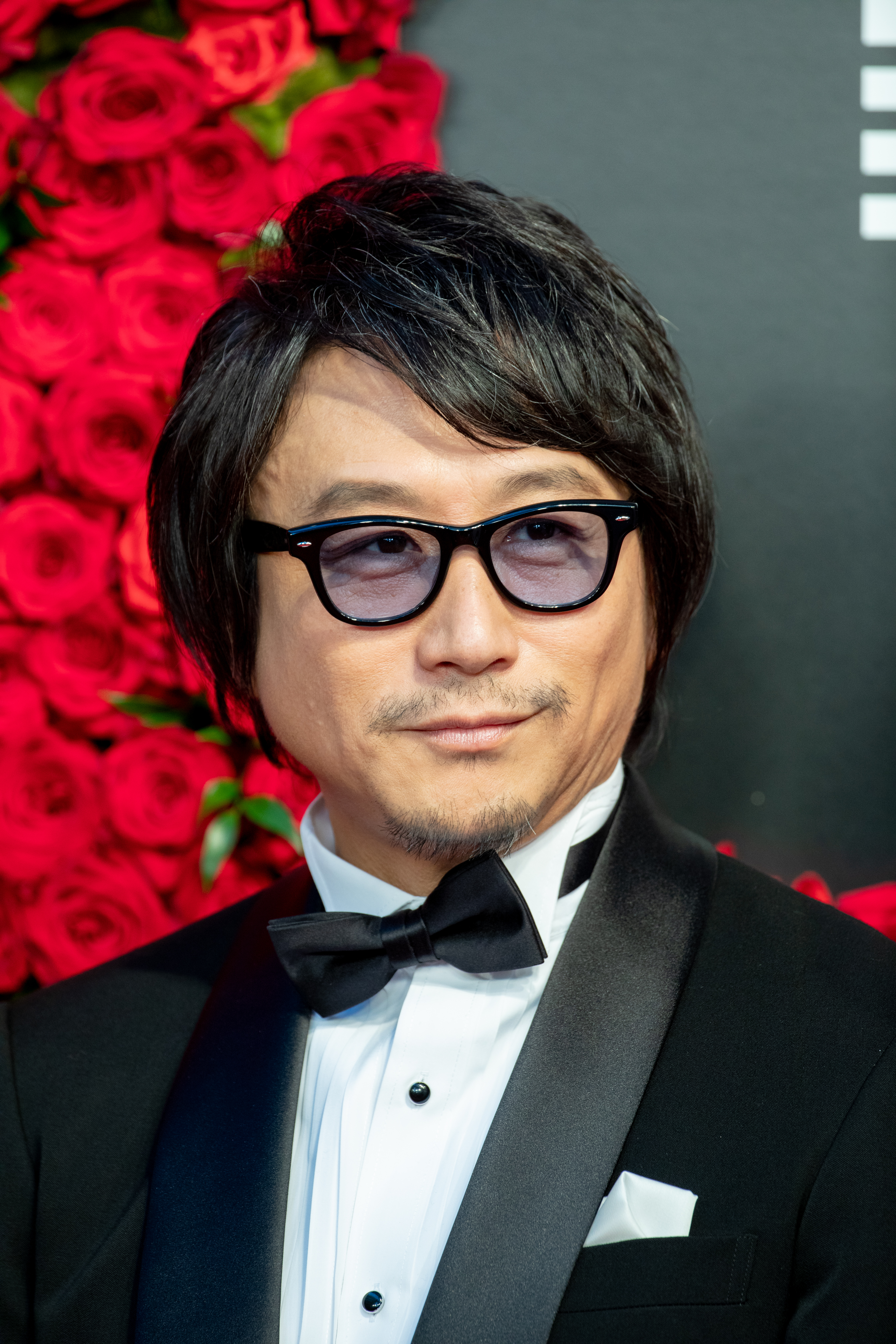
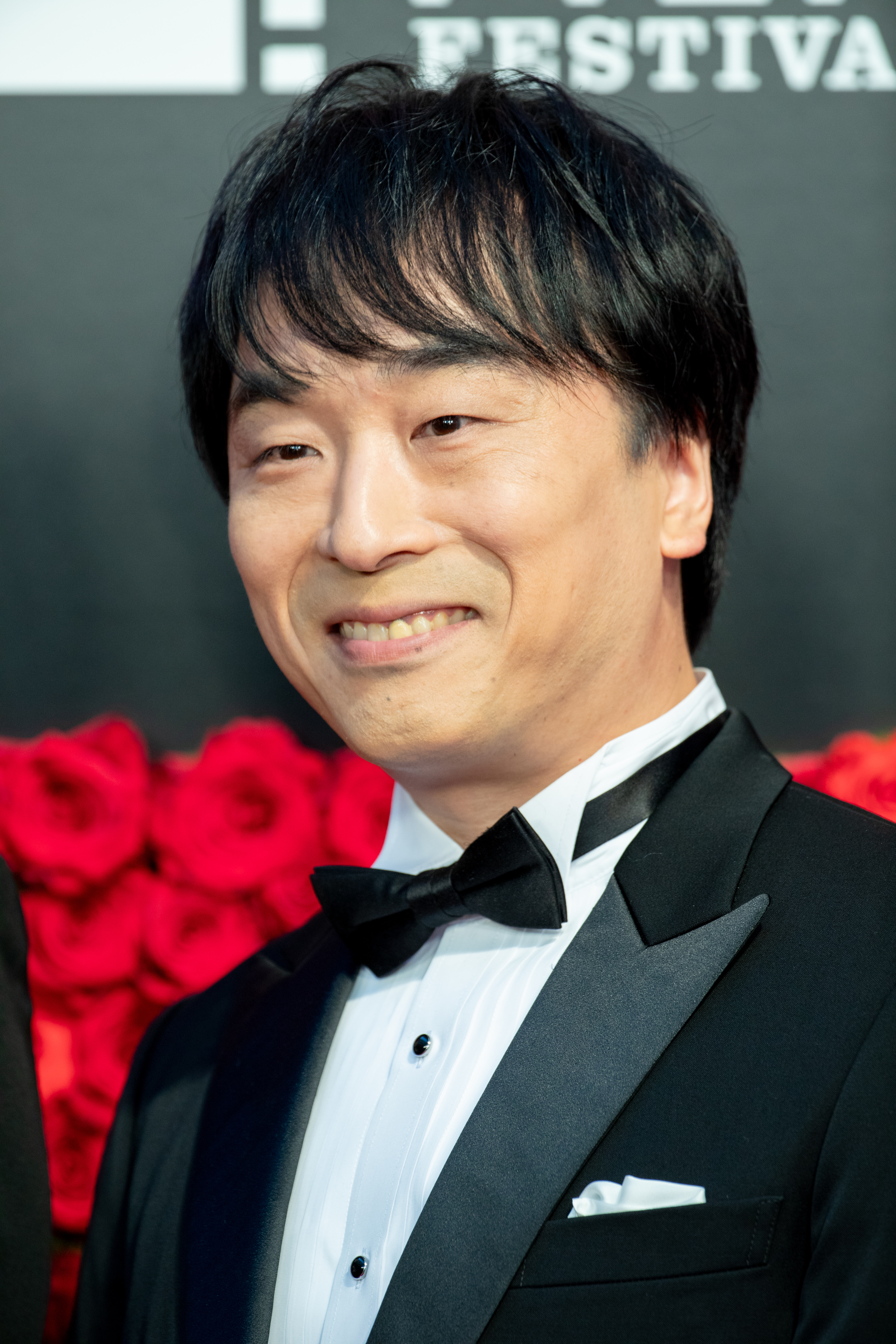
The main cast include Ayane Sakura (Shimotsuki), Kenji Nojima (Ginoza), Hiroki Touchi (Sugo), and Tomokazu Seki (Kogami). Not pictured is Kinryū Arimoto (Masaoka), who died after making the film.
- Voice actress Ayane Sakura believed Mika Shimotsuki was now more fitting for the role of a heroine thanks to her experience in the second television series where she was the youngest main character. Once the first movie premiered Shiotani commented the trilogy would "broaden your perspective [the audience's]. They're those kinds of movies". Sakura found that Shimotsuki displayed a more gentle behaviour during the narrative, feeling it would display a more mature take. Cherami Leigh voices Shimotsuki in the English dub.
- Kenji Nojima (Ginoza) had a similar reaction to Sakura's role in regards to a more upbeat trait than in Psycho-Pass 2. Following recording of the film, Sakura believed the trilogy was amazing to her due to Sakura's character arc. Nojima mentioned that as Ginoza's hairstyle changes along with his values with Sakura seeing his personality of the second film and the first television series to remind her of the antagonistic Shimotsuki in retrospect. Jessie James Grelle voices Ginoza in the English dub.
- Kinryū Arimoto voiced Tomomi Masaoka. It was Arimoto's final performance before his death. The actors described Masaoka's role in the franchise a fatherly figure not to only his son Ginoza but also Kogami. The actors expressed grief in regards to having no more Arimoto. Jason Douglas voices Masaoka in the English dub.
- Hiroki Touchi voices Teppei Sugo. Touchi referred to his story as a drama story that might appeal to both male and female demographics. Mike McFarland voices Sugo in the English dub.
- Tomokazu Seki voices Shinya Kogami. Seki still appreciated the handling of Kogami while also experiencing pressure because of the character's popularity with fans. He further stated how people might enjoy the trilogy as each movie tells a different that, despite being set in the future, revolves around the detective genre. Robert McCollum voices Kogami in the English dub.
- Sumire Morohoshi voices Tenzing Wangchuk. The director felt that Morohosh's work would be fitting to fit with Seki's work as Kogami, something the actor agreed. Bryn Apprill voices Wangchuk in the English dub.
- Kana Hanazawa as Akane Tsunemori Kate Oxley voices Tsunemori in the English dub.
- Akira Ishida as Shūsei Kagari Kyle Igneczi voices Kagari in the English dub. Igneczi replaced Scott Freeman who originally voiced Kagari in Psycho-Pass.
- Hiroe Oka as Kyōka Tsujichō
- Keiichi Nakagawa as Akira Karasuma Bradley Gareth voices Karasuma in the English dub.
- Kimiko Saitō as Aiko Gentaku
- Masaki Terasoma as Itsuki Ōtomo David Matranga voices Itsuki Ōtomo in the English dub.
- Masumi Asano as Risa Aoyanagi Colleen Clinkenbeard voices Aoyanagi in English.
- Miyuki Sawashiro voices Shion Karanomori and Lydia Mackay voices Shion in English.
- Rikiya Koyama as Rodion Matsuki
- Sachie Hirai as Takeya Kukuri
- Saori Yumiba as Izumi Yasaka while Jill Harris voices Izumi in English.
- Satoshi Tsuruoka as Jean-Marcel Belmondo
- Sayaka Ohara as Rin Ōtomo Molly Searcy voices Rin Ōtomi in the English dub.
- Shizuka Ito as Yayoi Kunizuka Lindsay Seidel voices Yayoi in the English dub.
- Takahiro Sakurai as Shō Hinakawa Zach Bolton voices Hinakawa in English.
- Takako Honda as Frederica Hanashiro Erin Kelly Noble voices Frederica in English.
- Tomoyuki Shimura as Kinley Dorji
- Tsutomu Isobe as Guillermo Garcia Brian Mathis voices Garcia in the English dub.
- Yoshiko Sakakibara as Jōshū Kasei

== Release ==
At the Japanese box office, Case 1 grossed ¥189,833,400, Case 2 grossed ¥90,801,400, and Case 3 grossed ¥98,001,400, adding up to a total of ¥378,636,200 for the trilogy. The three movies were released all on September 18, 2019, in Japan in DVD and Blu-ray. Each home media release has appeared in Oricon for bestselling volume in their releases.

In Hong Kong, it was released by NeoFilms in theaters with the first movie shown on August 1, 2019. In Singapore, the trilogy was shown in Japanese with English subtitles on November 2, 2019.

The film was also released in Western regions. Selecta Vision has released the trilogy in Blu-Ray and DVD for Spanish-speaking countries. Kaze Germany has released the trilogy in German-speaking countries. Kana Home Video has released the trilogy in Blu-Ray and DVD for French-speaking countries. In June 2021, Anime Limited licensed the trilogy aiming to release them in August in the UK and Ireland. It was released on October 18. Crunchyroll announced they will be streaming the trilogy on September 8.

== Reception ==
The first film of the trilogy earned positive responses. Anime News Network scored the first film a "B+" based on the further characterization of the returning leads Shimotsuki and Ginoza, which is effective when seeing the need for help potential criminals have, but criticized the fight scenes as too overthetop. Similar response was given by All Time Anime due to the handling of the returning cast, most notably Shimotsuki, as this last character felt portrayed better than in the previous anime series. The reviewer praised the themes explored in the first movie without regarding dystopia While Medium also enjoyed the character development of Shimotsuki and Ginoza, the reviewer found the antagonists to be quite one-dimensional which highly contrast the first series' villain, Shogo Makishima, who was far more interesting.

Both the second and third film received an "A−" by the same site, praising the way Production I.G handled the narrative not only of each individual episode but also of the Psycho-Pass franchise in general. Medium felt that while Masaoka's handling helps to entertain more the audience, First Guardian was the most boring title of all, finding the story "dull" and Sugo as not interesting. All Anime said while the second instead focused on thriller elements while comparing with director Mamoru Oshii's most famous works, referencing Patlabor 2 and enjoyed the handling of mystery involving the criminal featured in the movie.

The third film attracted more positive reviews. Blog All Anime commented on Kogami's dilemma in the third movie. He concluded the reviewer positively stating in regards to the director as "the evidence of these new absorbing, enjoyable films, Shiotani isn't hidebound by PSYCHO-PASS's guignol heritage; he believes all it really needs are solid, interesting stories." Medium claimed that the third movie had the most entertaining story for hidden depths and appealing nature give to Kogami when training Tenzing and having the most original narrative as a result of exploring more the characters than the Sybil System which contrasts the previous films. Anime News Network praised not only the interactions between Kogami and Tenzing but also Frederica as she is given more complex role in the story in regards to how she often sees Kogami and needs him to return to Japan in an elaborate plot rather than a simple plot device to promote the upcoming sequel, Psycho-Pass 3.

In October 2019, the trilogy took the seventh place in the Newtype film awards of the year. In retrospective, Shiotani believes the early screening of the first two movies were a success. Sumikai recommended the movies to the series' fans for having consistent quality.
