= Tokyo Marble Chocolate =

2007 Japanese original video animation (OVA)

東京マーブルチョコレート
- Original video animation
- Directed by: Naoyoshi Shiotani
- Produced by: Masahiro Kurihara; George Wada
- Written by: Masaya Ozaki
- Music by: Takeshi Yanagikawa
- Studio: Production I.G
- Licensed by: BI: Anime Limited; NA: Anime Limited
- Released: December 5, 2007
- Runtime: 26 minutes (per episode)
- Episodes: 2

Tokyo Marble Chocolate (東京マーブルチョコレート, Tōkyō Māburu Chokorēto) is a Japanese anime OVA directed by Naoyoshi Shiotani, animated by Production I.G. and, based on Fumiko Tanikawa's manga of the same title.

In October 2007, it was screened at the Tokyo International Film Festival.

The animation is a collaboration between Production I.G and BMG Japan in commemoration of both companies' 20th anniversaries. The story follows a young man and woman, both unlucky in love, as they begin to fall in love on Christmas Day - thanks to the intrusive actions of a Mini Donkey and the romantic backdrop of Tokyo Tower.

== Plot ==
Chizuru loves Yuudai; Yuudai loves Chizuru. Yet, neither of them can say it clearly because, not only are they both uncertain about the other's feelings but, a mutual fear of hurt stemming from failed relationships in their pasts continues a pattern of misunderstandings. So trapped by their insecurities that their relationship is going nowhere, they drift further and further apart. While Chizuru thinks this is the end of the road, Yuudai struggles desperately to overcome his cowardly nature before he loses what is most important to him. There are two sides to every story, every relationship; but can love survive if both sides can't meet halfway?!

== Staff ==
- Naoyoshi Shiotani - Director and Mini Donkey character design
- Fumiko Tanikawa - Character designer
- Kyoji Asano - Animation director
- Masaya Ozaki - Screenwriter
- Production I.G - Original story
- Takeshi Yanagawa - Music
- Francesco Prandoni & Andrez Bergen - English edit

== Awards ==
Tokyo Marble Chocolate was awarded the Grand Prize in the Feature Film Category of the 12th Seoul International Cartoon & Animation Festival (SICAF 2008), held in Seoul, Republic of Korea, from May 21 to 25, 2008.

The jury was composed of Giannalberto Bendazzi (a professor of the history of animation at Milano State University in Italy), Noriko T. Wada (a Japanese producer) and Kyung-jo Min (a South Korean director). The award ceremony took place in Seoul on May 25, 2008.
