= Seoul International Cartoon and Animation Festival =

Annual festival in Seoul, South Korea

Coordinates: 37°34′N 126°59′E

- Status: Active
- Genre: Multi-genre
- Venue: COEX and CGV theaters
- Location: Seoul
- Country: South Korea
- Inaugurated: 1995
- Attendance: Nearly 320,000 in 2004
- Organizer: SICAF Organizing Committee
- Website: http://www.sicaf.org

The Seoul International Cartoon and Animation Festival (SICAF, Korean: 서울 국제 만화 애니메이션 페스티벌, romanized: Seoul Gugje Manhwa Aenimeisyeon Peseutibeol) is an annual showcase festival of animation, cartoon and related art genres held in Seoul, South Korea since 1995. It is sponsored by the Ministry of Culture, Sports and Tourism and the city of Seoul. The main mascots are "Bummy" (버미) the tiger (after the original Korean word "bum" (범), which means tiger) and "Tanko" (땡고추, very hot chili pepper).

The festival has exhibitions, showing of animation films, promotion booths and various special events. There are an official competition section and invited guest section. Awards are given to the categories of long animation, short animation, TV & commissioned works, and internet animation. Online popularity votes are held as well. Grand prix winning animations include Hungary's The District! (2005), Japan's Tokyo Marble Chocolate (2008), and the Irish-Belgian-French The Secret of Kells (2009).

Among notable SICAF events was a 2003 performance by Ferenc Cakó, a Hungarian sand animation artist, which has been widely distributed online.

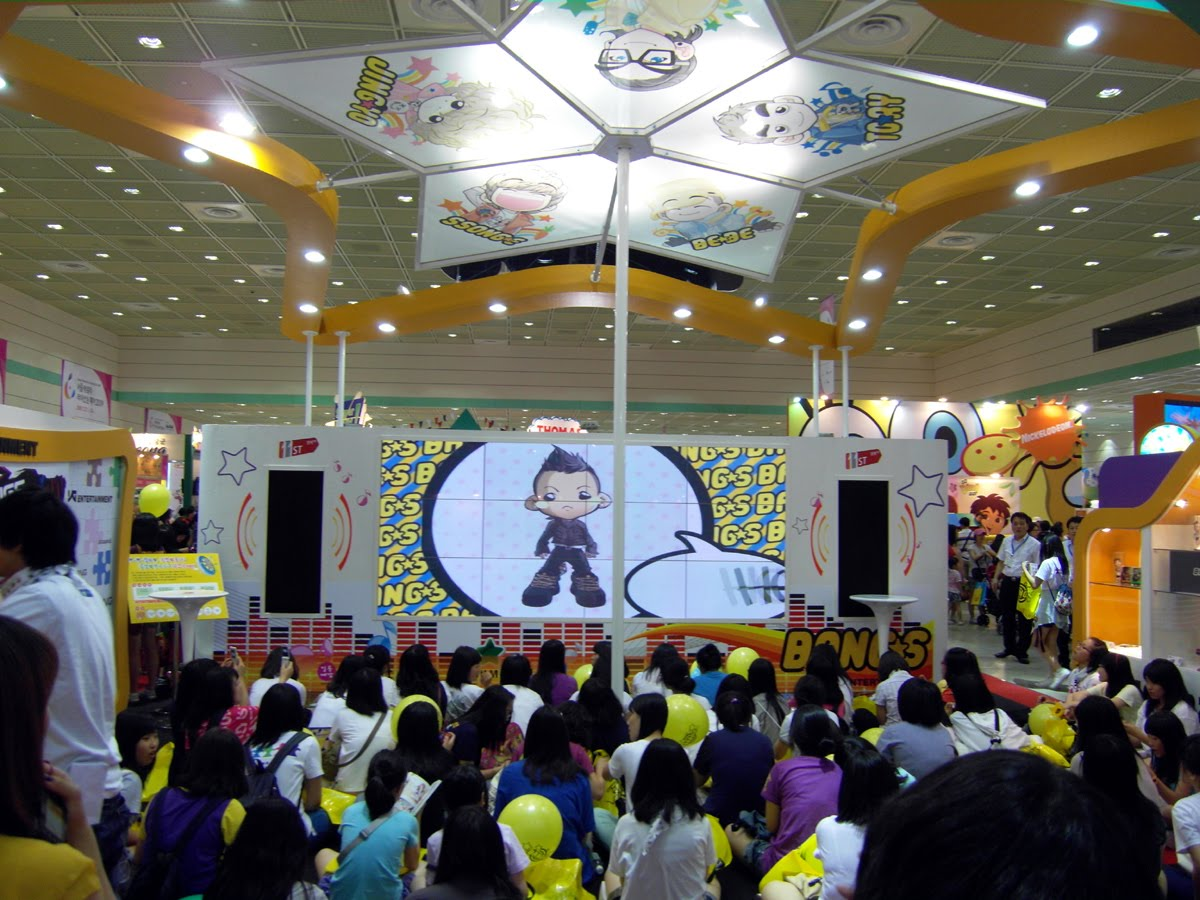
A booth at SICAF 2009

== See also ==
- List of festivals in South Korea
- List of festivals in Asia
