= Psycho-Pass 3: First Inspector =

2020 anime crime film

- Directed by: Naoyoshi Shiotani
- Screenplay by: Tow Ubukata
- Starring: Yūichi Nakamura; Yuuki Kaji; Kenyu Horiuchi; Mamoru Miyano
- Music by: Yugo Kanno
- Production company: Production I.G
- Distributed by: Toho
- Release date: March 27, 2020
- Running time: 137 minutes
- Country: Japan
- Language: Japanese
- Box office: $757,096

Psycho-Pass 3: First Inspector is a 2020 anime science fiction crime film produced by Production I.G and directed by Naoyoshi Shiotani. The film acts as sequel to the 2019 anime Psycho-Pass 3, the third season of Psycho-Pass series. It stars the talents of Yuuki Kaji, Yūichi Nakamura, Mamoru Miyano, Kenyu Horiuchi, among others. Set in a dystopia known as the Sibyl System, the film explores the Inspectors Kei Mikhail Ignatov, Arata Shindo, among others who clash with the terrorist group Bifrost in a clash to take Tokyo governor Karina Komiya. The film released to theatres in Japan on March 27, 2020.

Shiotani aimed to bring closure to Psycho-Pass 3 while also highlighting an interesting drama between the main cast and expand on the themes explored in the franchise: mankind dealing with society. The main cast expressed intrigue in how the narrative will explore the main characters due to how the television series ending on a cliffhanger.

The film received positive critical response by the media for the handling of Shindo and Ignatov as they have an appealing rivalry with the menacing three remaining Bifrost members who were noted to be entertaining villains. While the narrative was praised for focusing on several characters, some writers felt their inclusion as meaningless fanservice as the Psycho-Pass 3 characters are more developed.

== Plot ==
The film is presented as three 45 minute episodes.

=== Ziggurat Capture Part 1 ===
Koichi Azusawa from the mysterious criminal group Bifrost coordinates an assault on the Public Safety Bureau, using Chiyo Obata along with a pair of Peacebreakers, Jackdaw and Vixen. Meanwhile, Shirogane returns to Bifrost where he prepares to gamble against Shizuka Homura on the outcome of the assault. Azusawa shuts down the Bureau's headquarters and with Obata frees the latent criminals in the holding cells and arms them so that they can attack the detectives as a diversion. Following the initial attack, Unit One is without its Inspectors, Unit Two is destroyed by the Peacebreakers and Unit Three is locked outside the building. Azusawa also takes Unit One Inspector Arata Shindo hostage. Outside, Inspector Kei Milhail Ignatov is contacted by Shirogane, who promises to tell him the truth about his brother's death in return for his allegiance. Sugo follows Ignatov to the meeting point where they are both ambushed by a sniper turret. Shinya Kogami and Nobuchika Ginoza from the Suppressing Action Department of the Foreign Affairs Operations Department arrive and work together with Ignatov to foil the ambush and make their way to Public Safety. Azusawa demands that Governor Karina Komiya resign or everyone in the building will be killed. The Peacebreakers capture the bureau chief Hosorogi, to force the issue, but she jumps from the top of the building to her death rather than become a pawn for Azusawa. Meanwhile, Shion Karanomori and Karina Komiya find and release Arata.

=== Ziggurat Capture Part 2 ===
Ignatov and the SAD use a MFA helicopter to attack the drone sniper turret and manage to destroy it, but also set off a series of explosions. Ignatov and Kogami gain entry via the roof where they link up with Kisaragi and Irie, and Shindo updates him on the current situation. Shindo leads Karanomori and Komiya towards the server room and are intercepted by Jackdaw, but they manage to escape with the intervention Ignatov and other detectives including Shinya Kogami. This enables Shindo to escort Komiya and Karanomori to the server room to restore internal communications. Azusawa calls Ignatov and offers a deal to exchange the governor for his wife, but he refuses the deal. Komiya and Karanomori reach the server room, but it is booby trapped with poisonous gas. Karanomori relishes the challenge of beating Azusawa and manages to restore a third of the system, but is knocked out by the gas. Ignatov, along with Irie and Kisaragi arrive and rescue them. Meanwhile, Shindo rescues En Owanee from a fighting robot and deduces that the gas filling the building's lower floors is harmless so he calls Azusawa's bluff. Public Security decides to use Karina's AI doppelganger Ma-Karina to fake her death, though Ignatov secretly sends Ma-Karina's data to Homura at his request. Meanwhile, Shindo "traces" Azusawa and learns that there is a connection with his father.

=== Rainy Day, and ===
Through his trace, Shindo remembers that his father Atsushi made a deal with Bifrost to protect him from the Sibyl System after discovering he is criminally asymptomatic, meaning he would have his brain taken by the organization. He deduces Azusawa's desire as he trades information on the Peacebreaker remnants overseas to the Ministry. At Bifrost, Shirogane realizes that Karina is not dead. Kogami and Ignatov kill Jackdaw and Vixen, respectively, and prepare to arrest Azusawa, but Shindo wants to confront him himself. Azusawa and Obata are confronted by Shindo. Azusawa reveals to Shindo that the development of Ma-Karina was part of Bifrost's plan to open up a new exploit in the Sibyl System, and that his ultimate aim is to become part of Sibyl. Bifrost was originally a debugging unit during the early days of the Sibyl System, but its members began abusing their position to take advantage of Sibyl's vulnerabilities. Homura reveals he used Ma-Karina to counter Shirogane's AI-assisted investments, resulting in Shirogane's death. Homura then nominates Sibyl to be the next Congressman, intending to destroy Bifrost, and Sibyl subsequently absorbs Bifrost's system into itself. Shindo takes Azusawa to the Sibyl System's core, where Azusawa requests to join Sibyl. However, Sibyl refuses, as Azusawa is not criminally asymptomatic and Shindo arrests him.

Afterwards, Karina explains to the public that the attack on Public Safety was orchestrated by domestic anti-Sibyl terrorists. Homura is chosen to replace the missing Hosorogi as the new chief of Public Security, and former inspector Akane Tsunemori will be assigned as an Enforcer. She is released from confinement and is picked up by Kogami. Shindo and Ignatov admit that they are keeping secrets from each other, but promise they will eventually tell each other the truth. In the film's post credit scene, Tsunemori contacts Shindo and Ignatov, stating she will tell them of an event that occurred two years prior.

== Production ==
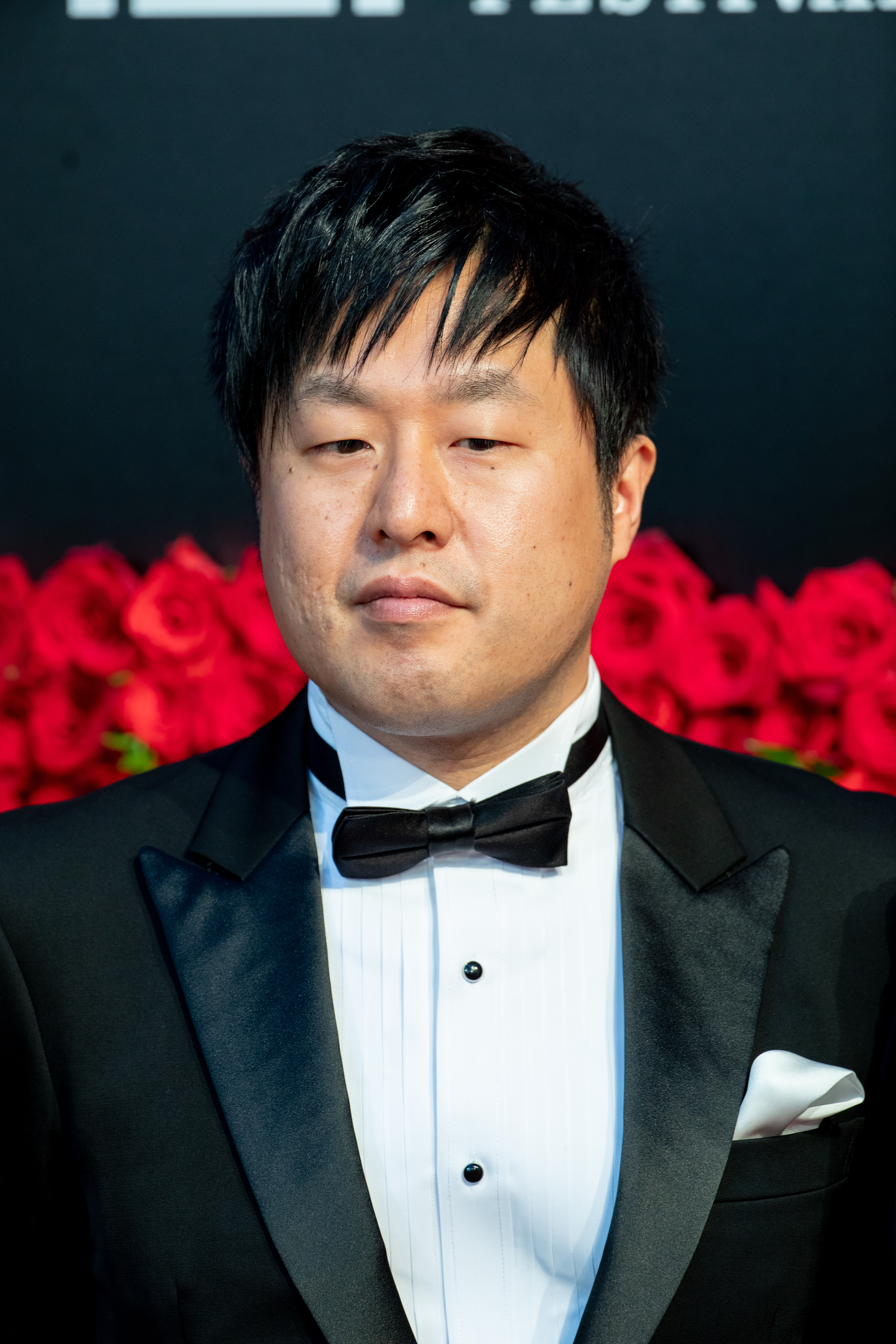
Director Naoyoshi Shiotani returned to work in the film.

The film was first announced on December 12, 2019, after the release of the final Psycho-Pass 3 episode. The film opened in theaters in Japan, and streamed exclusively on Amazon Prime Video worldwide. Naoyoshi Shiotani directs the movie with Akira Amano as character designer with Production IG doing the animation. The film was supposed to have opened in Japan on March 27 and screened for two weeks in theaters in Japan. It was marketed as "the final showdown between Shindo and Ignatov." It has a new opening theme song titled "Synthetic Sympathy" by Who-ya Extended, while the ending is "Red Strand" by Cö shu Nie. Who-ya Extended felt honored to be in charge of the theme song for the movie version of which was their second work, following the television anime series. Enjoying the series, they have repeated trial and error aiming for a number that can continue to run with the work. In that way, he thinks that a lightning-like song that pierces the listener's mind, which traps that world view, was born.

Although the emphasis is on the drama part, the director course there is also action. It's not my hobby, but in the end, Psycho-Pass has a part to talk about with a fist Shitoani wonder if Kaji could express the action he wanted to show, as much as he said, "It's a police drama." Shiotani claimed the film took longer than expected to make. The director claimed that he wanted to give the cast variety, including personalities as well height such as the contrast between the small Arata Shindo and other characters like Shinya Kogami. The organization Bifrost was kept in mystery in the television series in order to have them explored more in the film. In regards to actions performed by returning characters from previous series, Shiotani did not want to focus on them too much. In recording of the film. The relationship between Shindo and Ignatov was placed in a complicated form in order to bring a possible fight between the two lead characters in the film. Similar to the previous television series, First Inspector's theme was to explore how mankind has face the system.

Shiotani wanted to make a story about First Inspector as a live-action action in one place with time constraint". Koichi Azusawa, who has committed crimes only by calculation without getting his hands dirty, and the cautery and swords in the isolated island box of the land. He also wanted to show in action that he would dare to attack the Public Safety Bureau building, which is the safest place with the strongest security. The concept of the Sybil System was further expanded and more importantly the relationship between humans and systems. This time the teams are also conscious of illuminating humans who oppose the system. And there is justice that he does not talk about in Shizuka.

Shitoani started thinking that ever since the 2015 Psycho-Pass movie, the staff should try handling new characters for the series which led to the creation of Arata and Kei. He aimed to add more fight scenes inspired by live-action series more prominent within Arata and Kei while also exploring the former's connection with the Sybil System. The director was also pleased with the two protagonist's voice actors, believing they fit well in the story.

First Inspector was released via DVD and Blu-Ray in Japan on July 15, 2020, under Toho Video. Upon its release, writer Tow Ubukata was glad with Production I.G's work, with fellow writer Makoto Fukami thanking him for their cooperation. While Ryo Yoshigami was not able to participate in the script production, he remember being moved when reading the ending of the story. He thought Psycho-Pass 3 would be completed with this work.

=== Cast ===
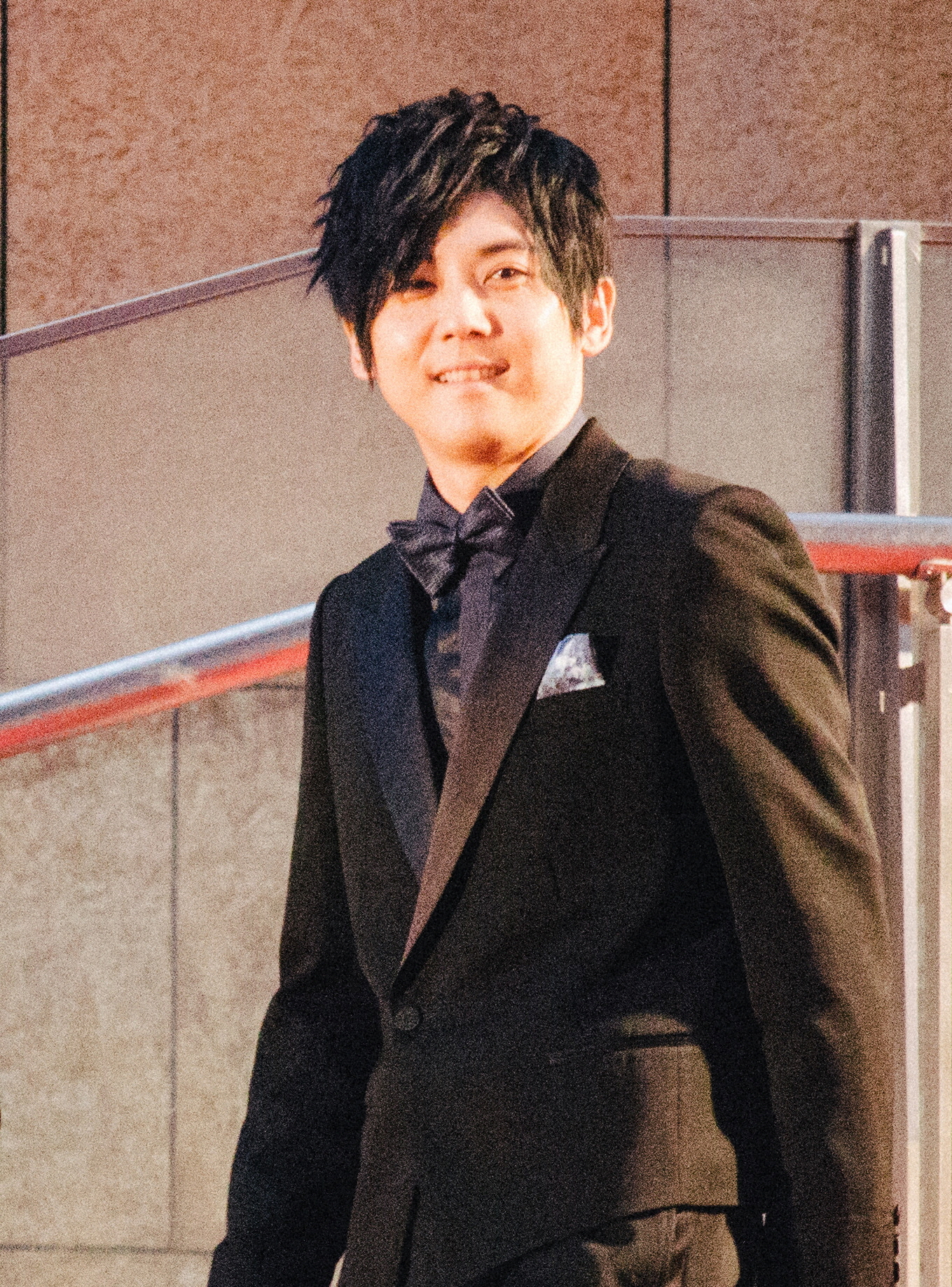
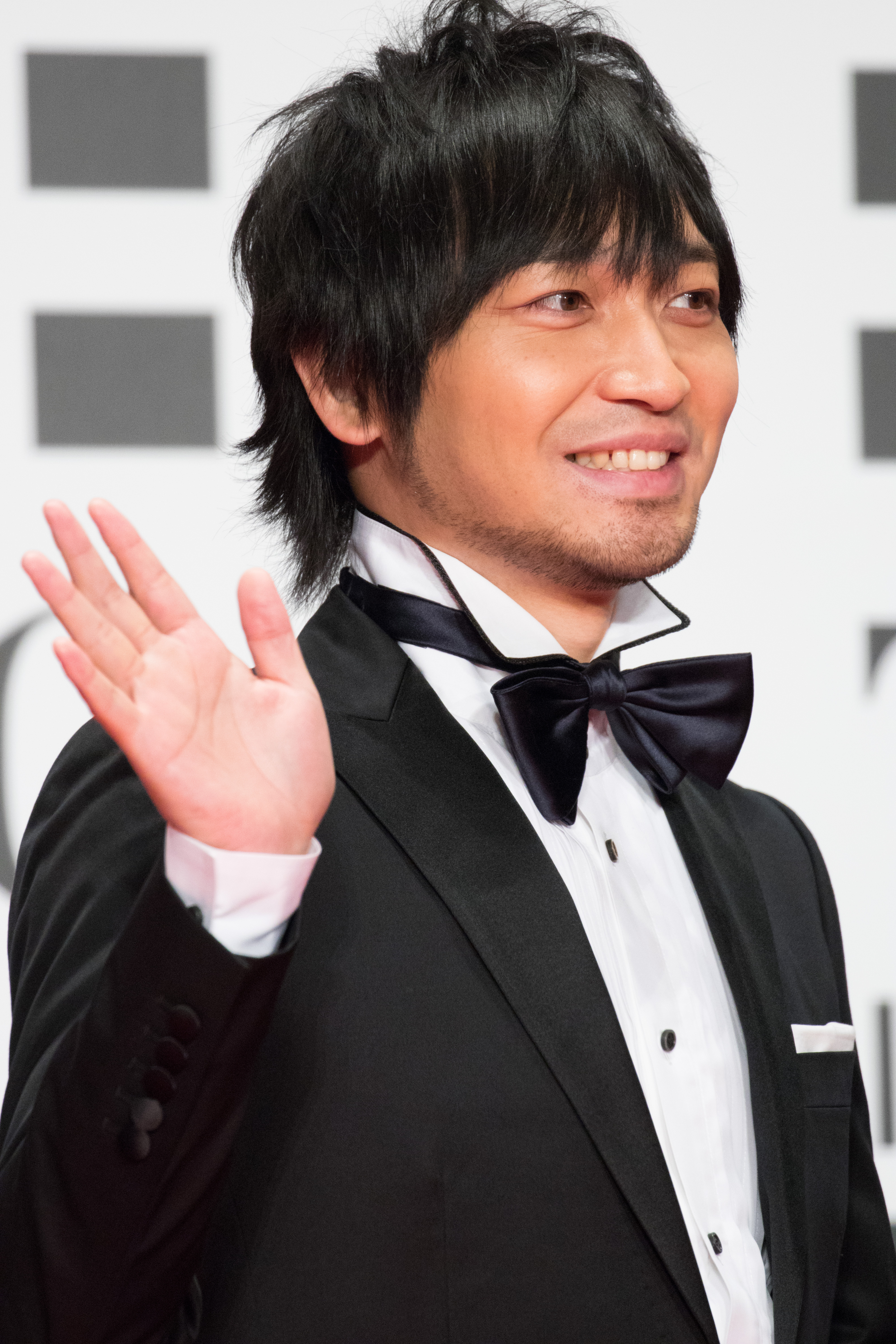
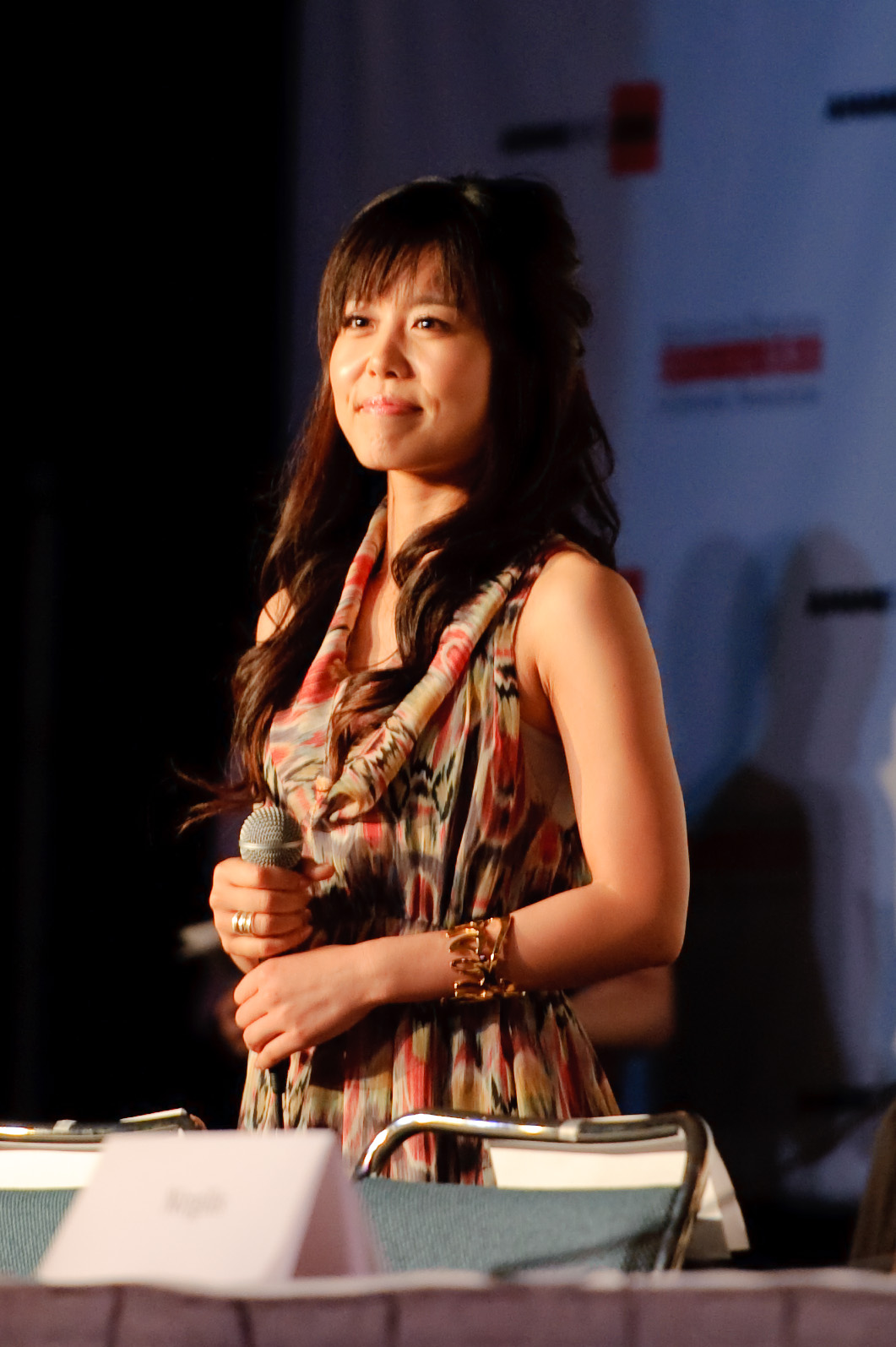
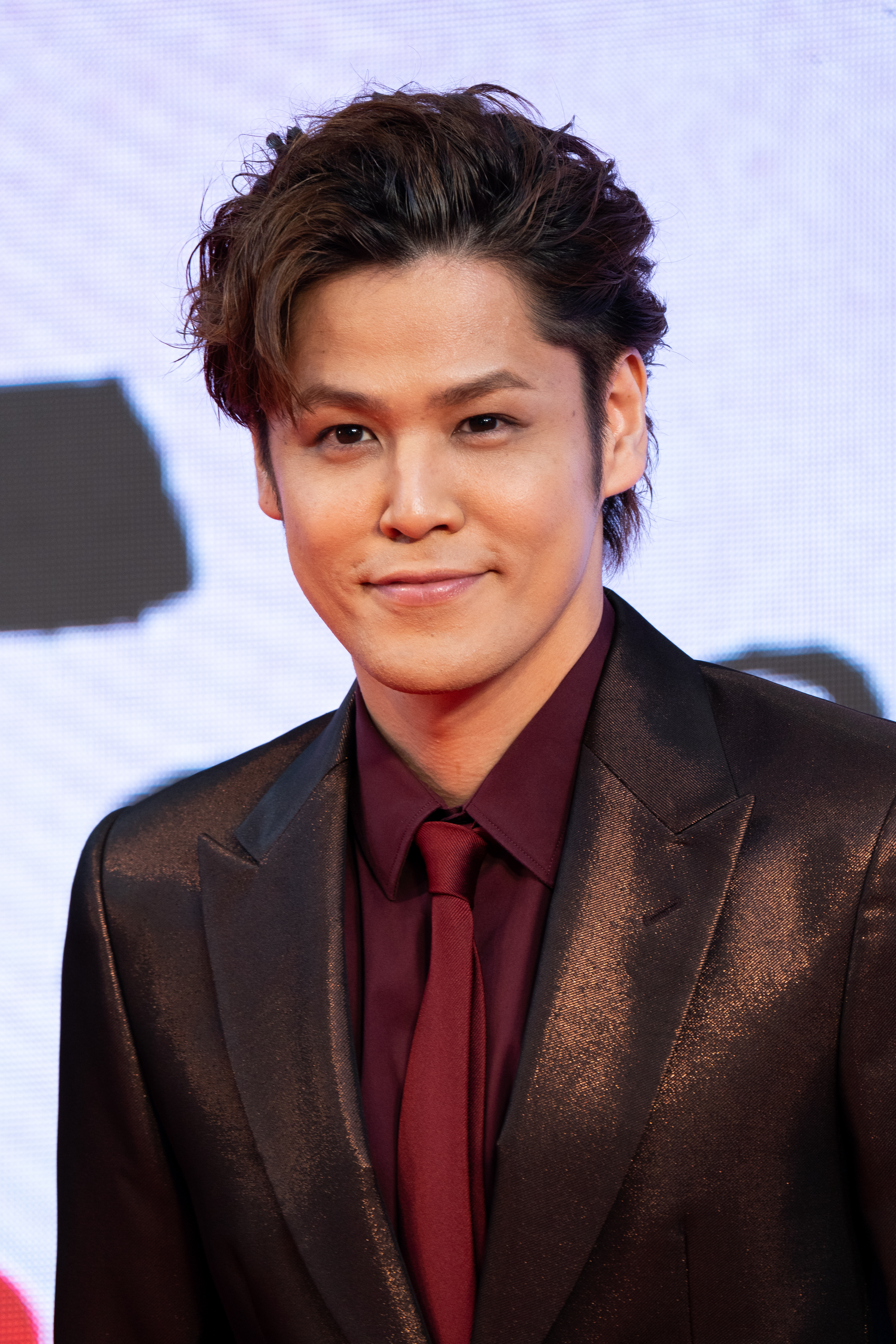
The main cast include Yuki Kaji (Shindo), Yuichi Nakamura (Ignatov), Miyuki Sawashiro (Kanamori), Mamoru Miyano (Homura) among others.

The main cast returned with:

- Yūki Kaji being interested by the mysteries behind the members from Bifrost and the handling of the Sybil System. Shiotani claimed that Kaji's work as Arata Shindo was remarkably good.
- Yūichi Nakamura expressed pressure with his work due to Ignatov possibly betraying his friends. However, he was relieved with the film as he felt Ignatov did not make such change. In regards to his role in the movie, Nakamura stated that before its release, the cast could not watch it due to they only have seen the script and doing recording. However, he looked forward to it.
- Mamoru Miyano expressed pleasure in working in the film, praising the way the narrative was handled. He regarded as his own character as a mystery, believing the audience originally thought he was the actual antagonist.
- Kenyu Horiuchi voices Koichi Azusawa. The staff drew parallels between Kajil's and Nakamura's characters with Miyano's and Horiuchi's while also highlighting the antagonists as mysterious. Azusazawa was easy to play until the end, but when asked if he caught a human being, it was very difficult due to his sudden depths when he confronts the Sybil System. Kaji called Azusawa as a mysterious character and felt that the movie's take on his connections with the Sybil System were interesting.
- Miyuki Sawashiro voices Shion Kanamori. Shiotani was asked by Sawashiro concerns about her character's traits.
- Yōko Hikasa voices Karina Komiya. Kaji found Komiya to be properly developed ever since her debut in the television series and looked forward to seeing her in the movie.

== Reception ==
Reviews of the series focused on the main conflict between Units One and Bifrost as one of the strongest parts from the film. Biggest in Japan enjoyed based on how the latter takes advantage over the enemy without problems, with Anime Manga also enjoying the handling of Asusawa and duality between Shindo and Ignatov's backstories. The characterization of Arata Shindo was also praised when he exposes the Sybil System during his confrontation with Asusawa, the site drew parallels with between the Inspector with his predecessors Tsunemori and Shimotsuki due to how he is recognized as an equal. However, he felt that Ignatov's betrayal towards his allies does not reach a conclusion as he does not face a punishment. Finona also found Asusawa interesting as a villain but felt that his attack towards the Units felt too sudden as he faces little difficulties in becoming the film's antagonist. Though also noted that several characters get screen time in the movie, Fimona found that Shindo and Ignatov are the ones most focused on as they are the ones who had most of their character arcs to be properly developed. He also appreciated how Shion Kanamori also has proper screentime after several story arcs where she lacked focus. Geek Germany praised the focus the film gives not the large amount of characters featured in the story, including the three Bifrost remaining as antagonist with Abusawa being pointed out as the most interesting. Anime News Network gave the film an "A" for its themes and the characterization of the main cast. The writer enjoyed the rivalry between Shindo and Asusawa was properly executed due to how both expose their values in the climax.

Negative comments were also present with Biggest in Japan's reviewer noting that Tsunemori's actions before the series remain unknown and viewers would be disappointed by the lack of explanations. Geek felt that while the animation in general was well executed, the action scenes do not have the same appeal as the ones from previous works. Anime News Network felt the animation was properly done with background themes fitting the action scenes. Piunikaweb noted while Kogami and Ginoza appear in the movie, their inclusion feels more as fanservice to returning fans as the narrative focuses more on Psycho-Pass 3 new cast alongside Kanamori most notably, as they have to face Asusawa and stop him from killing the governor. Both Anime News Network and Anime Manga criticized it for not being a stand-alone film due to the viewers needing knowledge of Psycho-Pass 3 in order to understand it.

The film debuted at 8th in the box office chart and remained in the same position on its second week. CinemaHolic listed it as one of the most anticipated movies from 2020 as it would conclude the Psycho-Pass 3 plot. It grossed $757,096 at the box office.
