= Naoyoshi Shiotani =

Japanese animator (born 1977)

- 塩谷直義
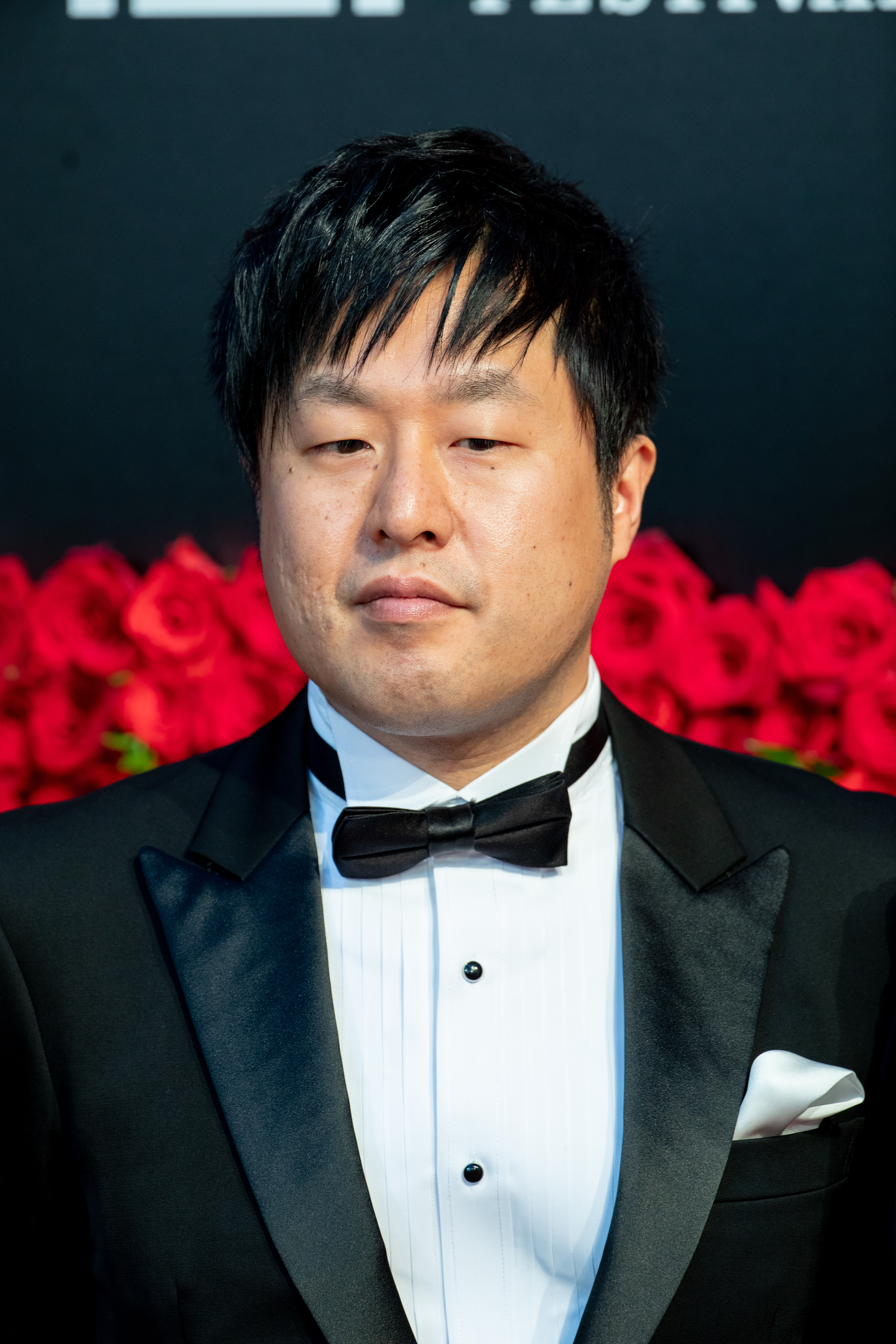
- Born: December 27, 1977 (age 48)
- Occupation: Director
- Notable work: Psycho-Pass

Naoyoshi Shiotani (Japanese: 塩谷直義, Hepburn: Shiotani Naoyoshi) is a Japanese director who was worked into multiple works from the studio Production I.G. He is famous for directing all Psycho-Pass works. He was voted the third director in Newtype's anime awards.

== Biography ==
As a child, Shiotani was a fan of animation and enjoyed drawing. His favorite works were Studio Ghibli film, like Hayao Miyazaki's My Neighbor Totoro and Kiki's Delivery Service. He was also a fan of Production I.G. through their franchises Ghost in the Shell and Patlabor. He was also a fan of live-action films including Blade Runner, Minority Report, Gattaca, Fifth Element, Seven, Brazil and the Millennium trilogy.

Upon joining Production I.G., Shiotani became interested in combining traditional animation with cgi animation for his works, most notably Oblivion Island. Shiotani's first directed work was the film Tokyo Marble Chocolate which he made for a young a demographic by giving it the theme of a family. He then directed the 2012–2013 television series Psycho-Pass which became one of his highlights of his career.

Psycho-Pass originated from Production I.G.'s interest in making a successor to Mamoru Oshii's Ghost in the Shell and Patlabor; the company hired Katsuyuki Motohiro—who became the series' chief director—and veteran I.G. animator Naoyoshi Shiotani to supervise direction. Before work on Psycho-Pass started, Shiotani was busy working on the film Blood-C: The Last Dark. As soon as his work with the film ended, Shiotani focused on the series' quality. After episode 16, which proved to be the most challenging and popular of the series, the team found themselves "out of stamina". The next two episodes were made by an outside team, which is reflected in several problems with the animation. Once development of the second season started, Shiotani said the new episodes are more difficult to make than those in the first season. He said, "it's more about the show's inflexibility" because the staff have to maintain consistency. During the final episodes of the first series, Shiotani conceived the idea of a Psycho-Pass film. Urobuchi and Motohiro said the film would have to contain a scenario independent of Japan's Sibyl System society. Shiotani wanted to create the film in collaboration with the staff who had worked on season one of the series, and with character designer Naoyuki Onda and art director Shuichi Kusamori, who also worked on the series. Urobuchi believed the ideal sequel would be a film rather than a television series but wanted to stay true to the roots of the original series.

The films Sinners of the System were first announced in Japan by Fuji TV in March 2018. Shiotani returned as the films' director. Novelist Ryō Yoshigami wrote the first film's script while the second one was written by Makoto Fukami. For the 2019 anime series, Shiotani entrusted the writer Ubukata, Fukami and Yoshigami with handling a new cast.

== Commentary ==
Psycho-Pass often deals with the idea of free will suppressed by Sybil System. Shitoani commented it is more important for us to be independent, have a broader perspective and be able to change those perspectives, rather than clinging onto something too much. He believes that is that cool person who can do that, and thus likes drawing that kind of person. Cool people have the strength to take action, the strength to judge for themselves and their way of life itself. By drawing them firmly, the moments that seem really cool will stand out right from the start. Because it is a society where people's actions are restricted such as in Psycho-Pass, Shiotani always want to draw people who resist against society while searching for their own way of life. He believes the kind of strength he wants to draw.

== Works ==
- Ah! My Goddess: The Movie: In-Between Animation (Production I.G)
- Attack on Titan (TV): Key Animation (OP2)
- Azumanga Daioh (TV): In-Between Check (Production I.G; eps 11, 17)
- Blood+ (TV): Director (OP3), Storyboard (OP3), Animation Director (OP3; 2 episodes), Key Animation (OP1-3; ep 23)
- Blood-C (TV): Conceptual Design, Key Animation (OP)
- Blood-C: The Last Dark (movie): Director, Storyboard
- (Le) Chevalier D'Eon (TV): Storyboard (ep 18), Episode Director (ep 18), Key Animation (ep 18)
- Dead Leaves (OAV): In-Between Check
- Elfen Lied (TV): Key Animation (ep 8)
- Eyeshield 21: The Phantom Golden Bowl (movie): In-Between Check, Key Animation
- Fullmetal Alchemist (TV): Key Animation (Production IG)
- Ghost Hound (TV): Key Animation (ep 19), Layout Check (ep 1), Spirit Design
- Ghost in the Shell 2: Innocence (movie): In-Between Animation (Production I.G)
- Ghost in the Shell: Stand Alone Complex (TV): In-Between Animation (Production I.G; eps 1, 6, 11), In-Between *Supervisor (eps 8, 15, 21), Key Animation (eps 17, 21)
- Ghost in the Shell: Stand Alone Complex 2nd GIG (TV): Key Animation (ep 15)
- Haikyu!! (season 2) (TV): Storyboard (ED), Unit Director (ED)
- Immortal Grand Prix (TV 2): 3D CG (Production I.G; ep 3)
- Kaiketsu Zorori (TV): Key Animation (ep 28)
- Kimi ni Todoke – From Me to You (TV): Storyboard (ep 12)
- Kuroko's Basketball (TV 3): Storyboard (OP2), Unit Director (OP2), Key Animation (OP2; ep 75)
- Nurse Witch Komugi (OAV): Key Animation (Production I.G; ep 2.5)
- Oblivion Island: Haruka and the Magic Mirror (movie): Storyboard, Unit Director, Background Art (illustration)
- Otogi Zoshi (TV): Key Animation (8 episodes)
- Phantom of the Kill -Zero Kara no Hangyaku- (special): Director, Screenplay, Storyboard
- (The) Prince of Tennis (TV): Key Animation
- (The) Prince of Tennis: A Day on Survival Mountain (OAV): In-Between Animation (Production I.G), In-Between Check, Key Animation
- (The) Prince of Tennis: Two Samurais, The First Game (movie): Key Animation
- Prologue of Blame! (OAV): Storyboard
- Psycho-Pass (TV): Director, Storyboard (OP2; eps 1, 22), Episode Director (OP2; ep 22), Drawing Design (eps 6-8), Key Animation (eps 13, 22)
- Psycho-Pass 2 (TV): Director, Storyboard (ep 11), Episode Director (ep 5)
- Psycho-Pass: The Movie: Director, Storyboard, Unit Director
- Psycho-Pass: Sinners of the System (movies): Director, Story Concept
- Psycho-Pass 3 (TV): Director, Storyboard (eps 1-8)
- Psycho-Pass 3: First Inspector (movie): Director
- Psycho-Pass Providence (movie): Director, Story Concept
- Real Drive (TV): Episode Director (ED), Key Animation (ep 5)
- Reideen (TV): Animation Director (ep 5), Key Animation (ep 5)
- Sakura Wars: The Movie: In-Between Animation
- Samurai Champloo (TV): Key Animation (4 episodes)
- Sengoku Basara – Samurai Kings (TV): Storyboard (ep 2), Episode Director (ep 2), 2nd Key Animation (ep 2), Assistant Director, Key Animation (ep 2)
- (The) Sky Crawlers (movie): Key Animation
- Spirited Away (movie): Inbetween / Clean-up Animation
- Tekkonkinkreet (movie): Key Animation
- This Ugly Yet Beautiful World (TV): Key Animation (eps 7, 12)
- Tokyo Marble Chocolate (OAV): Director
- Tsubasa Reservoir Chronicle the Movie: The Princess in the Birdcage Kingdom: 2D Composite, 2D Effect, Key Animation
- Windy Tales (TV): Animation Director (ep 9)
- Wizard Barristers: Benmashi Cecil (TV): Storyboard (ep 3)
- xxxHolic (TV): Opening Key Animation
