= Psycho-Pass Providence =

2023 anime crime film

- Directed by: Naoyoshi Shiotani
- Screenplay by: Makoto Fukami; Tow Ubukata
- Story by: Tow Ubukata
- Produced by: Akitoshi Mori; Masaya Saitou; Fumi Morihiro
- Starring: Kana Hanazawa; Tomokazu Seki; Kenji Nojima; Shizuka Itō; Miyuki Sawashiro; Ayane Sakura
- Cinematography: Eiji Arai
- Edited by: Yoshinori Murakami
- Music by: Yugo Kanno
- Production company: Production I.G
- Distributed by: Toho Animation
- Release date: May 12, 2023
- Running time: 120 minutes
- Country: Japan
- Language: Japanese
- Box office: $640,825

Psycho-Pass Providence is a 2023 anime cyberpunk crime film in the Psycho-Pass franchise. It was produced by Production I.G and directed by Naoyoshi Shiotani. The film was first revealed in August 2022 as part of a celebration of Psycho-Pass reaching its 10th anniversary with TOHO distributing. It stars the talents of Kana Hanazawa, Tomokazu Seki, Kenji Nojima, Shizuka Itō, Miyuki Sawashiro, Ayane Sakura among others. It serves as a prequel to the third season of Psycho-Pass and its sequel film, Psycho-Pass 3: First Inspector. The plot starts with a string of terrorist attacks across Japan by the paramilitary force known as the "Peacebreakers," which is investigated by Inspector Akane Tsunemori and her team of latent criminals and are aided by the Ministry of Foreign Affairs who have experience fighting against the Peacebreakers—namely her former companion Shinya Kogami who returns to Japan following his mercenary days explored in Psycho-Pass: Sinners of the System.

Director Shiotani wanted to create a film that could be enjoyed by both a casual audience and returning Psycho-Pass fans. He worked carefully to appeal to returning audience by focusing on the now veteran character of Akane. Critical response to the film was generally positive with positive response given to Akane's development and team up with the missing Kogami from previous works though the themes led to mixed responses. The film grossed $640,825 in Japan.

== Plot ==
In January 2118, a Ministry of Foreign Affairs vessel guarding Professor Milicia Stronskaya is attacked by the Peacebreakers, a paramilitary group. One of the operatives, Kai, murders Stronskaya while searching for her research – the Stronskaya papers – before being intercepted by Shinya Kogami, a special investigator for Foreign Affairs's Suppressing Action Department (SAD). Kogami is attacked by a brainwashed SAD agent and fails to stop the Peacebreakers.

In Tokyo, Inspector Akane Tsunemori fights against the proposed dissolution of Japan's Ministry of Justice in light of the Sibyl System's attempts to expand overseas. Both Tsunemori and Atsushi Shindo, chief of the Immigration Bureau, receive word about the Peacebreaker incident and travel to the wrecked vessel. MWPSB Chief Josui Kasei orders Tsunemori to leave the investigation to the SAD, led by agent Frederica Hanashiro and SAD Director Yabuki. Enforcer Sho Hinakawa determines that Stronskaya sent a last-minute message to PSB analyst and Tsunemori's mentor, Joji Saiga.

Saiga tells Tsunemori that Stronskaya's message directed him to a PO box in Dejima. Chief Kasei creates a joint task force with the PSB and SAD to retrieve the Stronskaya papers before the Peacebreakers. Hanashiro tells Tsunemori's team that the Peacebreakers are a Foreign Affairs black-ops unit gone rogue. They are led by Tonami, a fanatical devotee of an unseen "god" he calls The General.

Kogami reunites with Tsunemori and Ginoza, despite heated tensions. Saiga encourages Kogami to apologize to Tsunemori for the illegal actions that led to his exile from Japan, while warning him not resist his violent nature. Kogami makes a half-hearted apology, and Tsunemori warns him that she will arrest him if he breaks the law again.

At the PO box, the team finds a decoy package, and Tsunemori and Kogami realize the operation is a ploy to lure the Peacebreakers out of hiding. The Peacebreakers attack, displaying impossibly low Crime Coefficients, superhuman endurance, and the ability to brainwash SAD agents. Director Yabuki is captured and Saiga is thrown off a ledge to his death. Kai overcomes Kogami after a lengthy skirmish. Instead of killing Kogami, Kai provides subtle clues leading to the Peacebreakers' headquarters and departs.

Kogami and Ginoza go to the Peacebreakers base to rescue Yabuki. They confront Kai, who reveals himself as undercover SAD agent Akira Vasily Ignatov, and returns to Tokyo with them. Akira debriefs Kogami about "the Divider", a cybernetic implant that allows the Peacebreakers to maintain low Crime Coefficients and take control of other SAD agents' implants. Akira reveals he has the Papers and that Professor Stronskaya organized her death to maintain Akira's cover. He explains that Stronskaya's research is the model for a Conflict Coefficient which would allow Sibyl to control warfare and foreign relations. Immediately after the debriefing, Tonami remotely takes control of Yabuki and Akira and attempts to escape, but encounters Shindo. Akira fights off Tonami's control, asks Shindo to look after his brother Kei, and allows Shindo to kill him.

Shindo gives the Papers to the Sibyl System in return for keeping his criminally asymptomatic son, Arata, from being integrated into the system. On the day of Kei's wedding to Maiko, Shindo gives a speech about justice before leaving the reception to commit suicide. Arata later confronts Tsunemori about his father's actions and she encourages him to search for the truth.

Kasei shuts down the investigation, as Sibyl has agreed to give the Peacebreakers the Papers and their own sovereign state on an island in northern Japan in return for them supporting Sibyl's global expansion. Unwilling to let them escape justice, Tsunemori teams up with Kogami, Ginoza, and Hanashiro to raid the Peacebreakers' island. Shimotsuki leads a support team against a Peacebreaker satellite.

Tsunemori goes off alone to face Tonami and the General, which turns out to be a medical AI offshoot of the Sibyl System. Tsunemori is badly injured but uses her Dominator to connect Sibyl to the General, destroying the rogue AI. Tonami prepares to execute Tsunemori, but Kogami arrives and shoots him, leaving Tsunemori distraught.

With the case officially closed, Tsunemori transfers Ginoza and Sugo to the SAD while the Sibyl System promotes her to a senior role within the Ministry of Welfare. Disillusioned, Tsunemori sends a letter to Kogami, revealing her intentions to challenge Sibyl's control of the justice system. At her inauguration ceremony, Tsunemori shoots Chief Kasei while maintaining a low Crime Coefficient, which should be impossible under Sibyl. Plans to expand Sibyl's realm of influence are put on hold, and Tsunemori is taken into custody, with Kogami resolving to free her.

== Cast ==
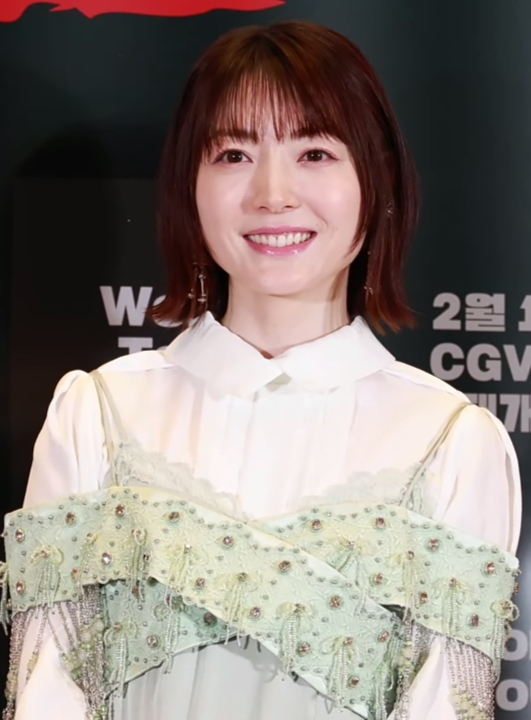
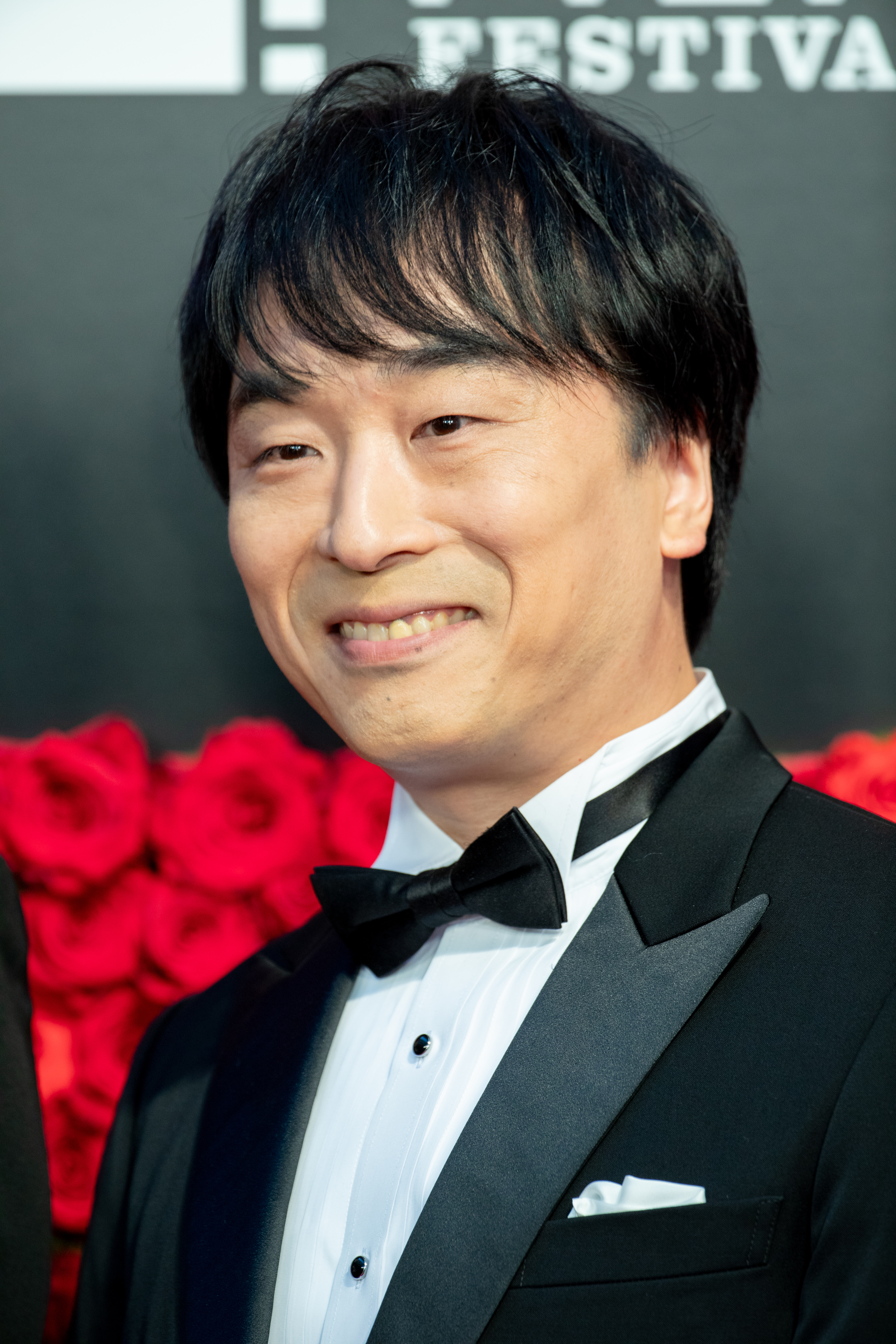
Kana Hanazawa and Tomokazu Seki, the Japanese actors who voiced Akane Tsunemori and Shinya Kogami, respectively

Characters	Japanese	English
Akane Tsunemori	Kana Hanazawa	Kate Oxley
Shinya Kogami	Tomokazu Seki	Robert McCollum
Nobuchika Ginoza	Kenji Nojima	Jessie James Grelle
Yayoi Kunizuka	Shizuka Itō	Lindsay Seidel
Shion Karanomori	Miyuki Sawashiro	Lydia Mackay
Mika Shimotsuki	Ayane Sakura	Cherami Leigh
Sho Hinakawa	Takahiro Sakurai	Z. Charles Bolton
Teppei Sugo	Hiroki Tōchi	Mike McFarland
Frederica Hanashiro	Takako Honda	Erin Kelly Noble
Jouji Saiga	Kazuhiro Yamaji	Michael Federico
Dominator	Noriko Hidaka	Stephanie Young

== Production ==
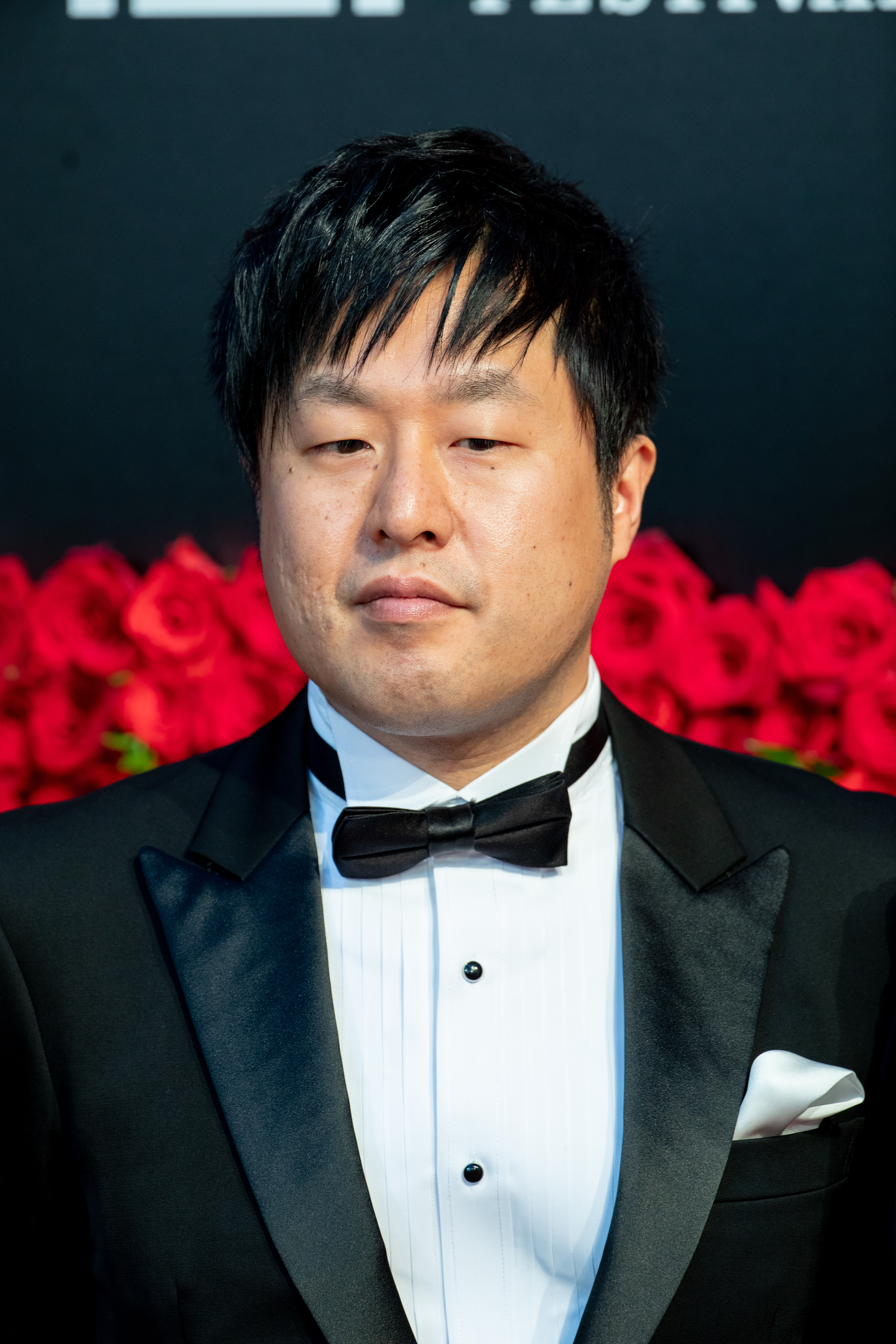
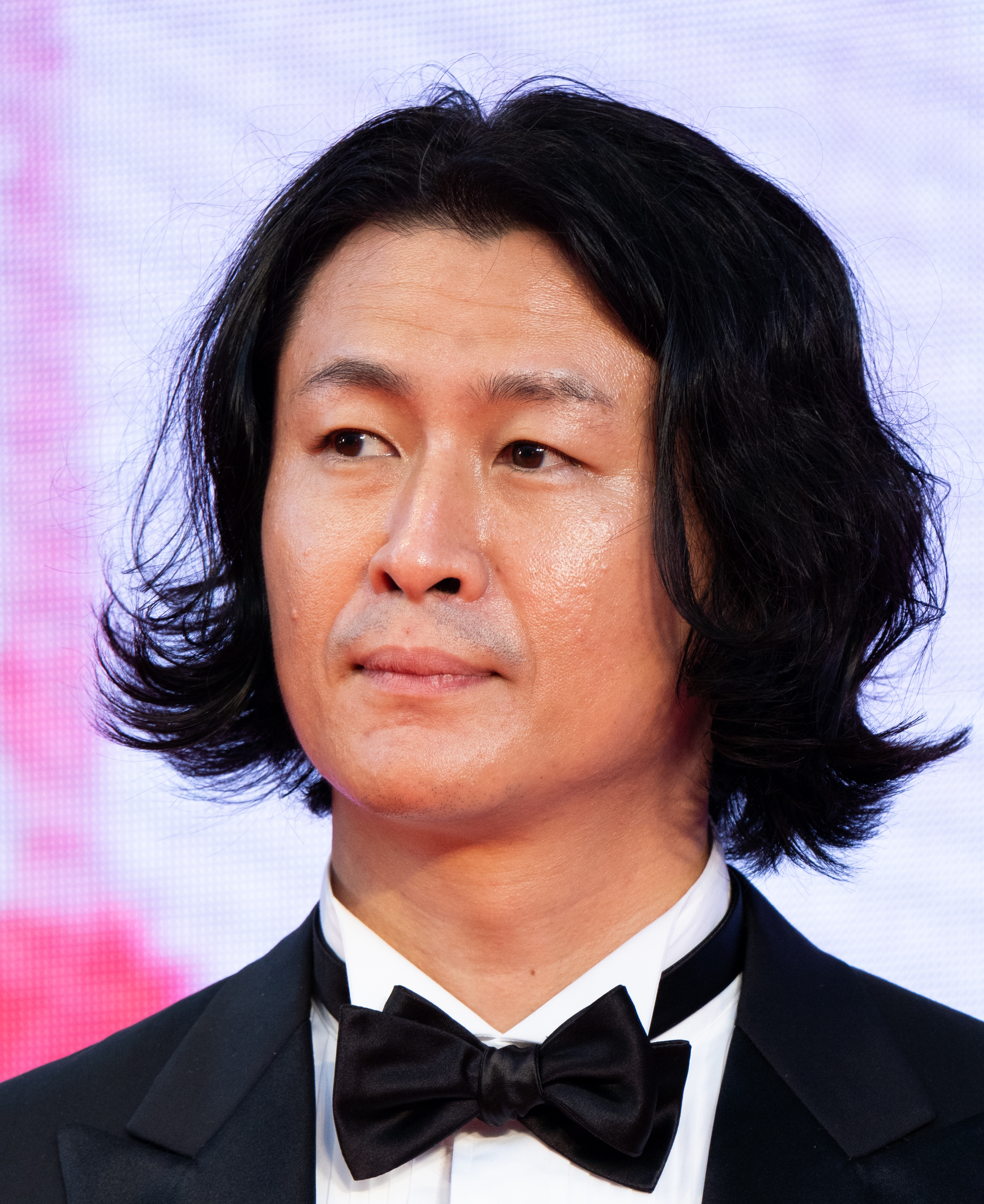
Naoyoshi Shiotani (left) and Tow Ubukata (right) returned to respectively direct and write Psycho-Pass Providence alongside Makoto Fukami (not pictured)

Director Naoyoshi Shiotani aimed to make a film that could easily be seen in cinemas by casual and Psycho-Pass fans. In January 2023, it was announced the film would premiere on May 12, 2023, featuring the return of writers Makoto Fukami and Tow Ubukata. Shiotani specifically wanted Akane Tsunemori to be the film's protagonist while Shinya Kogami would remain as her partner in a sense of a buddy cop. Fukami wrote a rough draft that Ubukata and the team elaborated on. The center of the story was the strong relationship between Akane and Kogami. While Fukami found the idea of a romance these two as romantic, he aimed to go further. Instead they act more like comrades, fighting the same enemy. Fukami was always conscious of the relationship and distance between the two when writing the script. Ubukuta found the idea of a romance could be troublemsome to the narrative as it would affect more their personalities. Kogami was written to come across as a violent character who is aware that his actions are not approved but still does the dirty work. Meanwhile, Tonami Tsugumasa, serves as a parallel to Kogami if he had never stopped his own personal goals. Ubukata cited Minority Report as a major influence for their work in Providence due to how both works detail how people can stop crimes before they are committed. Shiotani wanted properly make Kogami's return and interact with his mentor Saiga. The art director helped him. Saiga's death scene was one of the hardest to animate, most notably the expression Akane performs upon seeing him. Saiga's voice actor was worried about the impact the character would live in the protagonist. The fight scenes between Kogami and Kai were carefully animated to focus more on them than the background being affected by the strong weather.

Despite the three-year gap between the films Providence and First Inspector, Shiotani was pleased with the positive feedback from the fans. The film was influenced by social distancing time and wanted to give a subtle way of giving the viewers awareness towards it. In making the film, the team went to Aso in Kyushu and Hokkaido. There was a major focus in fight scenes which were given to voice actors early during the recording of the movie. They tried avoid comical shots and maintain the serious appeal the franchise is known for. Some main animators had been working in the franchise since the first season. Shinya Kogami's characterization was set up since the third Psycho-Pass: Sinners of the System movie with the character searching for another chance at life after his revenge story from the first arc. Meanwhile, Akane Tsunemori was written to also be taken seriously due to her age; According to the director, Tsunemori does not have a special trait when compared with the rest of the protagonists but stands out due to how she accepts the Sybil System. Eventually, the film would end up with the leads going to being their original selves after emphatizing pain and remaining strong.

Shiotani wanted to rebuild Akane's and Kogami's relationship returns even if they belonged to a different organisation. The scenes in which the two of them appear together came together naturally. He reflected that Kogami is frank about his voice without paying attention about how he is received while Akane is more straightforward. Shiotani wanted strong scenes about their relationship shaped by the entire franchise. Nevertheless, he considers Akane mindful. Atsushi Shindo was written from Akane's point of view, as a potential future puppet of the Sybil despite both carrying a strong sense of justice but unlike Akane, Atsushi has committed crimes he is well aware of. In regards to Tonami, when creating the script, he was more ambiguous. Shiotani revised him to make him expressly an arch-enemy whose sense of justice completely contradicts Akane and Kogami. Nevertheless, while Tonami has the chance of killing Akane, he still hesitates due to still carry a sense of justice. A scene involving the sense of comrades Kogami, Ginoza and Akane share was influenced by the film Satomi Hakken which the director watched as a chiild. Ubukata said Tsunemori is artless as she does not possess a peculiar way of thinking about things and doesn't lose the courage to say things that ought to be a given as though they are a given. This change led to similarities with Kogami. Nevertheless, she stands out due to her knowledge of Sybil which comes across as necessary for mankind. Fukami agreed and said that Akane's philosophy in deviating from ethical is something she will not forget. Depicting an ethically sound character like her straight-on is all the more important given the state of the world today.

In regards to the events of Sinners of the System film focused on Kogami, Fukami planned Kogami's return to Japan in advance to Providence to generate scenes where Nobuchika Ginoza is angered about his him. The team noted Ginoza acted more like a typical heroine that Akane herself in regards to Kogami's return. One of Kogami's lines of comfort to Akane is a direct reference to the first television series which helps to take back their original dynamic. Shiotani in particular cited the elevator scene involving the two leads talking as his favorite one. Initially, Kogami was written as a mentor figure to Tsunemori which the film recreates. While the franchise started with a season involving Akane and Kogami, the staff believes Providence serves as a good ending point as the duo reunite to solve another case together. However, finding an appealing villain in such a work was found challenging especially since Shiotani envisioned Psycho-Pass as a realistic story. Though the film primarily focuses on Akane, Ubakata believes it also carries Kogami's character arc from a traumatized man to a more righteous man thanks to being assisted by several characters, surpassing his feelings about Shogo Makishima.

The theme song "alexithymiaspare" by Ling Tosite Sigure, while the ending theme song "Tōjisha" (当事者; The One Concerned) by Egoist. "Tōjisha" was a song that the director says helps to describe Akane.

=== Cast ===
- Kana Hanazawa plays Akane Tsunemori. She expressed and joy in doing the role after 10 years as she was touched by the role the character took, reflected in the ending theme "Tōjisha".
- Tomokazu Seki plays Shinya Kogami, expressed that while Kogami's and Akane's story ended with Psycho-Pass 3, the film explored content not seen before and looked forward to fans' support.
- Kenji Nojima, who plays Nobuchika Ginoza, spoke about the appeal of the series as it reflects the problems in modern times even if it is set in a dystopia.
- Kazuhiro Yamaji, who plays Joji Saika, said that since his character has been a mentor to Akane since the first television series, he could see notable growth of the lead in the film which can be also seen thanks to the work of Hanazawa.

== Release ==
The film was first revealed in August 2022 as part of a celebration of the Psycho-Pass anime series reaching its 10th anniversary with Naoyoshi Shiotani returning to direct at Production I.G, and TOHO is distributing. The 10th anniversary was promoted by Tomokazu Seki, voice of one of the leads, Shinya Kogami. The radio program was also used again with Kenji Nojima, voice of Nobuchika Ginoza, serving as host. Multiple other promotional events were made across 2022.

Crunchyroll licensed the film globally and released it in U.S. theaters on July 14, in the United Kingdom and Ireland on August 2, in France on August 25 and Germany on August 29. Crunchyroll made the film available to stream worldwide, excluding Japan, on December 14, 2023. The film grossed US$287,843 in the United States. In total the film reached $640,825.

The Blu-ray was released in Japanese on December 20, 2023, and in English regions on November 5, 2024. In the United Kingdom, the film was released on December 2, 2024, by Crunchyroll.

== Reception ==
On the review aggregator website Rotten Tomatoes, Psycho-Pass Providence holds an approval rating of 90% based on 10 reviews. Anime News Network enjoyed how the plot develops Akane Tsunemori and manages to explain every mystery from the third television series at the same time. However, they did not find the major antagonist to be as appealing as previous characters. Despite praising the world scenario and visuals, The Medium felt the film lacked thought provoking ideas to engage the viewer. Espinof enjoyed the themes portrayed in the movie as well as Kogami and Akane's characterization but found the film lacked accessibility to be properly understood. Similarly, Cinepremiere praised the themes addressed in the movie but felt returning fans would enjoy it more than new audiences. The Guardian gave the a movie three out five stars calling it "It is thought-provoking, but, [] ever deeply engaging as the hastily characterised central duo are subsumed into a horde of powerbrokers and apparatchiks." The writer still praised the animation and fight scenes which really seem influenced by the movie Blade Runner.

GameRant acclaimed as one of the best comebacks the franchise it has since several viewers were disappointed by season 2 of the television series, praising the dynamic between Akane and Kogami which previous fans would understand where the movie would go after being hinted by the third season of the series and praising how the film's climax surprises everybody. DigitalSpy claimed that multiple viewers were confused by the ending where Akane is imprisoned and thus explained how the story does not directly explain that the protagonist is controlled by the Sybil, showing its flaw to the entire society by shooting somebody. Although the movie ends on a cliffhanger with Kogami promising the take Akane out of prison, the fact the sequel film Psycho-Pass: First Inspector already explored this gives the franchise a proper ending. Anime News Network listed it as one of the best films of 2023.

At the 8th Crunchyroll Anime Awards in 2024, Psycho-Pass Providence was nominated for Best Film.
