= Makishima =

Makishima (written: 巻島 or 牧島) is a Japanese surname. Notable people with the surname include:

- Karen Makishima (牧島かれん) (born 1976), Japanese politician

Fictional characters:

- Shogo Makishima, the main antagonist in Psycho-Pass
- Agito Makishima, a major character in Bio Booster Armor Guyver
- Yusuke Makishima, in Yowamushi Pedal
