= Zach Bolton =

American voice actor (born 1981)

- Born: Zachary Charles Bolton
- Occupations: Voice actor; ADR director; line producer
- Years active: 2004–present
- Spouse: Kara Edwards (2020–present)

Zachary Charles Bolton (born August 9, 1981) is an American ADR director, line producer, and voice actor, known for his work on English-language dubs of Japanese anime. He is often credited as Z. Charles Bolton.

In November 2020, he married voice actor Kara Edwards.

== Filmography ==
=== Anime series ===
List of voice performances in anime series
Year	Title	Role	Notes	Ref.
2011	Fairy Tail	Droy		
2011	Black Butler	Pluto		
2014	Psycho-Pass 2	Sho Hinakawa		
2015	Death Parade	Clavis		
2016	Assassination Classroom	Ryunosuke Chiba		
2016	My Hero Academia	Sansa, Hound Dog, Centipeder		
2016	All Out!!	Kasuga		
2017	Sakura Quest	Hideyoshi		
2017	Alice & Zoroku	Mr. Shikishima		
2017	New Game!!	Dragonfly Green	Season 2	
2017	Star Blazers: Space Battleship Yamato 2199	Mamoru Kodai		
2018	Tokyo Ghoul:re	Waka Asachi		
2018	Overlord	LUCI★FER	Season 3	
2018	Free! -Dive to the Future-	Johann		
2018	B't X	Savannah		
2019	The Morose Mononokean II	Justice		
2021	Wave, Listen to Me!	Komoto		
2021	SSSS.Dynazenon	Awaki		
2021	Otherside Picnic	Will Drake		
2024	Fairy Tail: 100 Years Quest	Droy		

=== Films ===
List of voice performances in film and television specials
Year	Title	Role	Notes	Ref.
2016	Psycho-Pass: The Movie	Sho Hinakawa		
2017	Black Butler	Takaaki Matsumiya		
2019	One Piece: Episode of Skypiea	Pierre		
2023	Psycho-Pass Providence	Sho Hinakawa		

=== Video games ===
- Borderlands 2 – O'Cantler, Pyrotech, Robb Claymore

== Production credits ==
=== Voice director ===
List of ADR/voice director credits
Year	Title	Role	Notes	Ref.
2008	Darker than Black	ADR director		
2010	Soul Eater	ADR director		
2012	B Gata H Kei	ADR director		
2013	A Certain Scientific Railgun	ADR director		
2013	Future Diary	ADR director		
2014	Space Dandy	ADR director		
2014	Psycho-Pass	ADR director	Also The Movie	
2014	Ghost in the Shell: Arise	ADR director		
2015	Tokyo Ravens	ADR director	Shared with Colleen Clinkenbeard	
2015	Absolute Duo	ADR director	Shared with Caitlin Glass	
2015	Soul Eater Not!	ADR director		
2016	Dimension W	ADR director	Shared with Colleen Clinkenbeard	
2016	Rurouni Kenshin (film)	ADR director	Shared with Joel McDonald	

=== Producer ===
List of producer credits
Year	Title	Role	Notes	Ref.
2012	King of Thorn	Line producer		
2013	Blood-C: The Last Dark	Line producer		
2022	Sing a Bit of Harmony	Assistant producer		
