= Shogo Makishima =

Character in anime series Psycho-Pass

- Psycho-Pass character
- Promotional illustration of Shogo Makishima
- First appearance: Psycho-Pass Episode 1: "Crime Coefficient" (2012)
- Created by: Gen Urobuchi
- Designed by: Akira Amano
- Portrayed by: Takahisa Maeyama (stage play)
- Voiced by: Takahiro Sakurai (Japanese); Alex Organ (English)

Shogo Makishima (Japanese: 槙島 聖護, Hepburn: Makishima Shōgo) is a fictional character who was introduced as the main antagonist in Production I.G's anime series Psycho-Pass. Makishima is responsible for several crimes, and the main cast, the Public Safety Bureau officers, are in search of him. He advocates the destruction of the futuristic society created by the Sybil System, in which people are treated according to their stress level rather than free will; Instead Makishima values past societies where people used to express themselves more. In his quest to destroy the Sibyl System, Makishima stands against multiple detectives, most notably the protagonist, detective Shinya Kogami, to whom he also relates due to both sharing the same hatred for the current oppressed society. Makishima appears in most of the series' print adaptations, and makes cameo appearances in the films Psycho-Pass: The Movie (2015) and Psycho-Pass: Sinners of the System (2019).

The character was created by writer Gen Urobuchi, who intended to make him look alienated from his society with influences from Heath Ledger's incarnation of the villain Joker from The Dark Knight (2008). Director Naoyoshi Shiotani found the character likable, paralleling Kogami, his main foil. Makishima is voiced by Takahiro Sakurai in Japanese, and by Alex Organ in English.

Critical reception of the character has been largely positive, with his role as a strong villain due to the impact of his actions on protagonists Akane Tsunemori and Shinya Kogami. Makishima and Sakurai's performance were well received by Japanese fans in a Noitamina poll.

== Creation and development ==
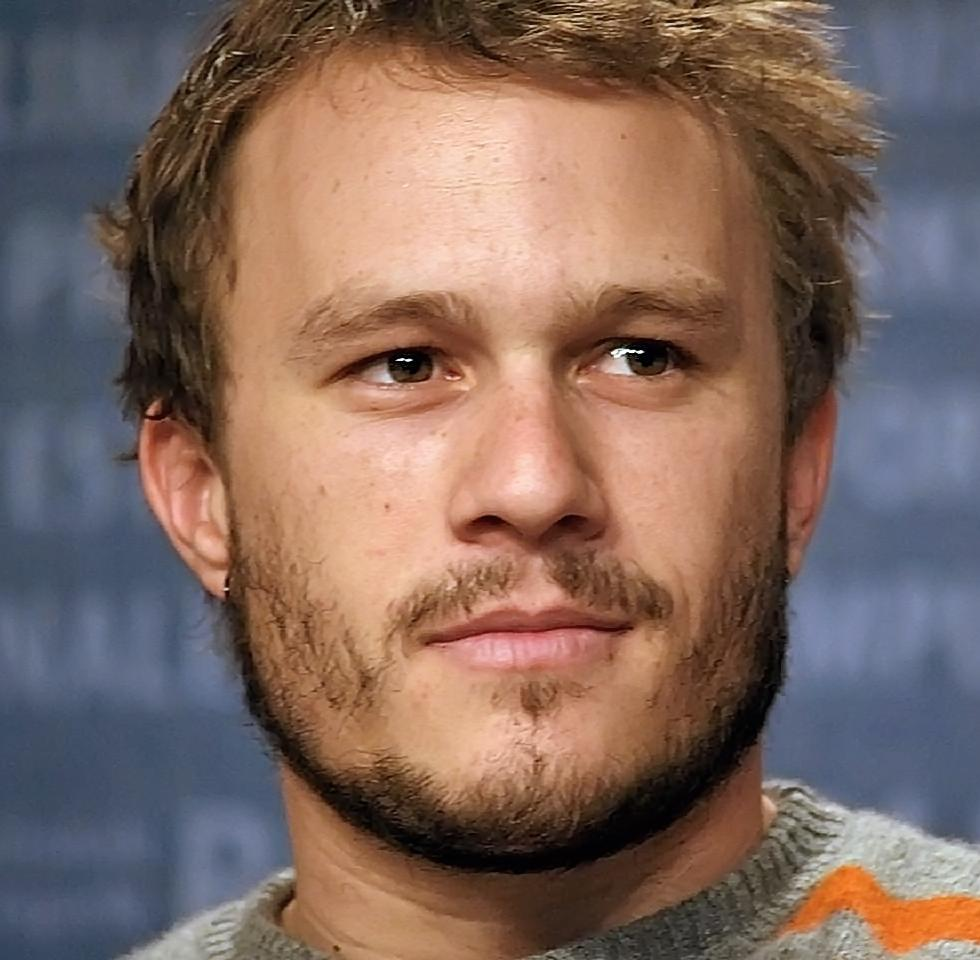
Heath Ledger was a major influence for Makishima's character.

The story of the first Psycho-Pass anime was written around the opposition between Shogo Makishima and Shinya Kogami. Lead character Akane Tsunemori often acts as the audience's surrogate when dealing with these two characters until she becomes able to understand Makishima's values about a desired utopia. Makishima is depicted as calm even during violent scenes according to staff. Writer Gen Urobuchi said one of the series' central themes is "fear"; Makishima feels out of place, but could have found happiness if he had been born into a normal world. Director Naoyoshi Shiotani regarded Heath Ledger's incarnation of the villain Joker from The Dark Knight (2008) as a major inspiration for Makishima; both characters are seen as criminals but the audience at the same time does not consider their way of thinking wrong.

Shiotani related to Makishima's dislike of the Sybil System's advanced technology and authoritarianism; The Sybil System present in Psycho-Pass oppresses people's lives forcing them to take a single path in contrast to the modernity. Shiotani thought the antagonist had more humanity than the policemen hunting him down; he also enjoyed Kogami's similar characterization to Makishima. The director said that parallels between protagonist and antagonist are common in fiction, reflecting a real-world individual's moral duality. Makishima is distinguished from Kogami by clothing color; Makishima wears white, and Kogami black. Their first names are also opposite; shōgo (正午) is the portion of the day from midday and sunset, and shin'ya (深夜) is the time from midnight to sunrise.

Character designer Kyoji Asano said the character's many facial expressions were the most difficult to articulate. Asano described him as "scary" as he claims Makishima makes no effort to hide his insanity. The designer said that he often had to tweak the handsome character's face to match his actions in the series.

=== Casting ===
Japanese voice actor Takahiro Sakurai had no idea what to think about voicing the antagonist of the series until he read the script for the series finale. Sakurai grew to like the character, especially during his final moments before his execution at the hands of Kogami in the series' finale. Director Shitoani said that although he originally saw the series from a police officer's point of view, he became sympathetic to Makishima. Sakurai said that despite his delight in killing, Makishima demonstrated signs of humanity when he discovered that his only friend, Choi Gu Sung, had been killed by a cyborg known as Chief Kasei. Shiotani agreed; they considered giving Makishima an additional scene in episode 20 in which the character talks to Sung.

Alex Organ voiced Makishima in English. Organ considered Psycho-Pass a step above what he had worked on to date; one of his first major roles, the narrative was darker than he had expected. The actor called Makishima complex, and was familiar with some of the series' Shakespearean passages.

== Appearances ==
Makishima is the antagonist of the first Psycho-Pass series where he wishes to take down the Sybil System which forces mankind to take their own destined lives rather than an option of free will. He is portrayed throughout the series as the mastermind behind the many criminal cases investigated by the Public Safety Bureau, including one which led to the demotion of the protagonist Shinya Kogami from inspector when one of Kogami's allies was murdered and his body dismembered. This deteriorates Kogami's mental state and the Sybil Society treats him like a criminal who remains working for them with the intention of having revenge. Despite Makishima's murderous intent, his Crime Coefficient (data collected on every member of society) never reaches a dangerous level. He claims that this is because his mind (and body) does not consider his murders and other crimes "wrong", but "sound"; this in turn makes him immune to the Dominator weapon worn by Inspector Akane Tsunemori. During the series, Tsunemori unsuccessfully tries to prevent Makishima from killing one of her friends. Makishima tries to destroy the Sybil System by distracting the Bureau forces with chaos in the streets, but is arrested by Tsunemori after a fight with Kogami. The Sybil System offers to spare his life if he will join them; he escapes, however, loathing the way the system acts like "gods". Makishima tries to convince Kogami to join his planned bioterrorism to weaken Japan's economy. However, the Bureau forces manages to stop him with Kogami leaving him a major wound using a knife in combat. Makishima tries to escape from his enemies but eventually gives up when the blood loss continues and stays in an oat field. Before his death, Makishima ask Kogami if he will replace his role but Kogami rejects him and shoots him in the head.

Makishima appears in the series' novelization, which expands on his relationship with Choe Gu-sung. In the prequel novel, he is the mastermind of the case in which Mitsuru Sasayama died and Kogami became an Enforcer. Makishima also appears in the manga adaptation Inspector Akane Tsunemori. In the films Psycho-Pass: The Movie (2015) and Psycho-Pass: Sinners of the System (2019), he appears in Kogami's hallucinations because of their similar ideas about justice. Makishima is a supporting character in the visual novel Psycho-Pass: Mandatory Happiness.

== Reception ==
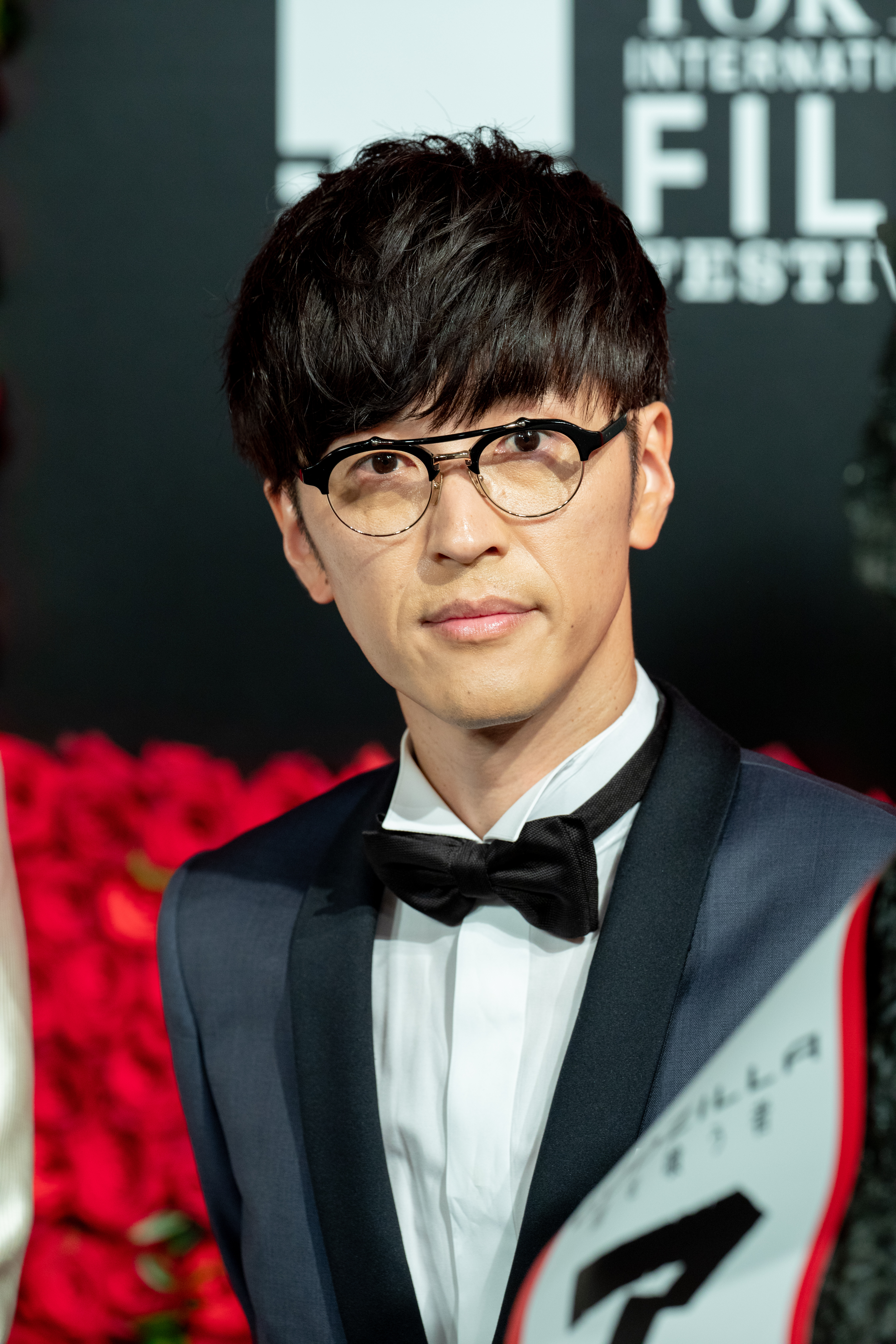
Takahiro Sakurai was Makishima's Japanese voice actor.

Critical reaction to Makishima has been mixed. Although his orchestration of several crimes was praised, Kotaku's Richard Einsbeis criticized his deus ex machina-like tactic to prevent himself to be shot by the system's weaponry in his debut when Tsunemori as the advanced gun only attacks criminals and Makishima is the exception. Thomas Zoth of Fandom Post among other reviewers praised the impact Makishima makes on Tsunemori after killing one of her best friends in a merciless scene. Jacob Chapman of Anime News Network (ANN) said Makishima's values are important to the audience as they find them acceptable despite his cruel methods. During the series' second half, Kyle Mills from DVD Talk called the character "a fantastic series villain." His fights against Shinya Kogami were also the subject of praise; Bamboo Dong of ANN appreciated the series' use of weaponry, but criticized Urobuchi's attempt to make the two rivals similar psychologically. Dong had mixed feelings about his later development as the narrative attempts to humanize a villain whose entire screentime was early portrayed with the idea of portraying social aberration. Although Zoth first lampooned the use of oats in Makishima's plan, he later found the oat field a good setting for the series finale when Makishima gives up and Kogami kills him.

Jacob Chapman from ANN also commented on Makishima's appearances Kogami has in the following works as a hallucination. He found Makishima's cameo appearance in Psycho-Pass: the Movie as "a little silly" as he is trying to force the Kogami's darker zone. However, according to an ANN review by Richard Eisenbeis of Psycho-Pass: Sinners of the System, the hallucination shown there was better executed. ANN writer Gabriella Ekens analyzed Makishima's tendency to cite literary works, most notably 1984 by George Orwell set in a dystopia similar to Psycho-Pass. Ekens compared Makishima and Kogami to Heart of Darkness by Joseph Conrad; Makishima Conrad's Kurtz forces Kogami's Marlow to abandon his ideals. The character relates to Beyond Good and Evil by Friedrich Nietzsche, aligning with Nietzsche about morality and ideals.

In a Noitamina poll, Makishima was voted the best character voiced by Takahiro Sakurai and ranked second in the Mister Noitamina category. Sakurai was also praised by Rebecca Silverman of ANN for giving the character a "creepily soothing tone". Other polls from Anime Anime have included Makishima as one of Sakurai's best anime performances. Ekens cited him as her favorite anime villain, and one of Gen Urobuchi's best-written characters.
