= Shinya Kogami =

Fictional character from Psycho-Pass

- Psycho-Pass character
- Shinya Kogami, as seen on the series' website
- First appearance: Psycho-Pass Episode 1: "Crime Coefficient"
- Created by: Gen Urobuchi
- Designed by: Akira Amano
- Voiced by: Japanese; Tomokazu Seki; English; Robert McCollum

Shinya Kogami (Japanese: 狡噛 慎也, Hepburn: Kōgami Shin'ya) is the protagonist introduced in the 2012 anime series Psycho-Pass. A police officer in a cyberpunk dystopia, Kogami becomes obsessed with murdering Shogo Makishima, a criminal mastermind responsible for the death of one of Kogami's former allies. The character has also appeared in manga and novel adaptations of the series, a prequel manga series, a stage play and the films Psycho-Pass: The Movie (2015) and Psycho-Pass: Sinners of the System Case.3 On the Other Side of Love and Hate (2019), which focuses on Kogami's life after the events of the first anime season. He reappears in the third television season, Psycho-Pass 3, as a supporting character. Additional novels and manga explore Kogami's work as an Inspector years before the start of the television series.

Kogami was created by the Production I.G. staff. Writer Gen Urobuchi created the character to contrast Akane Tsunemori, Kogami's police supervisor, whose personality and ideology are opposed to Kogami's. He was designed by mangaka Akira Amano, who wanted to give the character a strong sense of individualism in contrast to the scenario of the series. Kogami is voiced in Japanese by Tomokazu Seki and in English by Robert McCollum.

Critical reception of Kogami has been positive due to his interactions with Akane Tsunemori, and his return in the 2015 film was praised after his absence from the second Psycho-Pass anime season with the third anime season providing his return along with further depth in characterization. Kogami has been well received by fans, winning the "Mister Noitamina" award and placing in Newtype popularity polls on several occasions.

== Creation ==
=== Development and influences ===
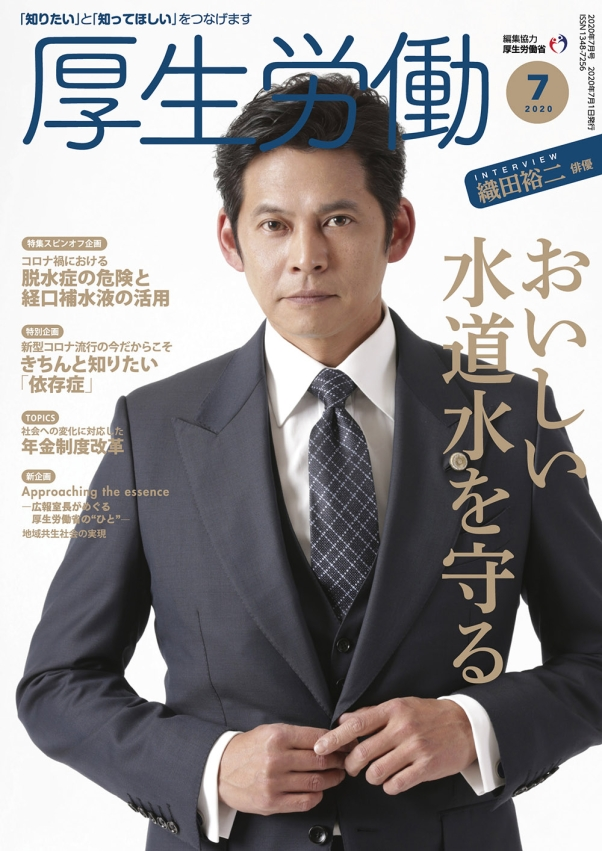
Kogami was inspired by Yūji Oda's (pictured) character from Bayside Shakedown: Shunsaku Aoshima

According to Psycho-Pass director Naoyoshi Shiotani, Production I.G. staff developed Kogami's character as a stark opposite to his enemy and rival Shogo Makishima, with Akane Tsunemori as the audience surrogate between them. Their first names indicate this opposition: Makishima's is Shogo (the time between midday and sunset), and Kogami's is Shinya (the time between midnight and sunrise). Writer Gen Urobuchi said that when he created Kogami and Tsunemori, he tried to balance their traits. Writer Tow Ubukata, who supervised the second anime series, called Kogami a "wild" character, the Japanese characters for his last name referring to his traits of loneliness and strength. The duo was further stated to resemble the lead characters from the Japanese police comedy-drama Bayside Shakedown, Sumire Onda and Shunsaku Aoshima. In the series' finale, Kogami disappears from society and is briefly seen in a boat reading the book In Search of Lost Time. This led to speculation that Kogami escaped to France with Urobuchi responding that while he might have travelled to different countries, he was unable to confirm his location when the series ended. Kogami's personality was initially designed as aggressive but after several revisions, is depicted as a gentle, calm, taciturn man. Shiotani described Kogami as a "troublesome person" (when dealing with Makishima) and said that although he liked Kogami, he would rather have the talkative Makishima as a friend.

The concept of Tsunemori seeking out the renegade Kogami was influenced by the original video animation series Mobile Suit Gundam: The 08th MS Team and the Western films Apocalypse Now and Saving Private Ryan. Tsunemori's search for Kogami was influenced by these films because the staff believed this scenario would appeal to both genders and different age groups. The non-romantic relationship between Tsunemori and Kogami emphasizes, instead, the trust they have in each other. The duo is stated to resemble Sumire Onda and Shunsaku Aoshima, the lead characters of the Japanese police comedy-drama Bayside Shakedown. In an official pamphlet, staff members share their view of both the similarities and differences between Kogami and Makisihima, much of it regarding Kogami's psychological growth. Fukami describes Kogami as the type of person who is happy to encounter those with bad intentions because "he just loves justice." Urobuchi, on the other hand, notes that Kogami lacks Makishima's panoramic vision and that he is "just a loser."

Since all Psycho-Pass were written from Akane Tsunemori's point of view, Shiotani wanted a new take on the franchise through to the trilogy Sinners of the System. Through this, Shiotani wanted to explore relationships not seen before like Kogami's and Ginoza's as well as introduce characters who would play a major role. In regards to the first film, Shiotani picked Nobuchika Ginoza and Mika Shimotsuki as the main characters due to their similarities to the protagonists from the first television series, Shinya Kogami and Akane Tsunemori, respectively. Nevertheless, he noted these duo employed a different dynamic from Kogami and Akane while noting how Ginoza has undergone a notable character arc across the previous projects related to Psycho-Pass mainly due to his relationship with Masaoka and Kogami. The character of Kogami was conceptualized as progressive hero by Shiotani due to how different is his first personality in contrast to his traits from the first television series. Through Sinners of the System, the director envisioned him as the main character who often interacts while showing the aftermath of his actions from Psycho-Pass: The Movie.

For Providence, Shiotani specifically wanted Akane Tsunemori to be the film's protagonist while Shinya Kogami would remain as her partner in a sense of a buddy cop. The center of the story was the strong relationship between Akane and Kogami. While Fukami found the idea of a romance these two as romantic, he aimed to go further. Instead they act more like comrades, fighting the same enemy. Fukami was always conscious of the relationship and distance between the two when writing the script. Ubukuta found the idea of a romance could be troublemsome to the narrative as it would affect more their personalities. Ubukata said Tsunemori is artless as she does not possess a peculiar way of thinking about things and doesn't lose the courage to say things that ought to be a given as though they are a given. This change led to similarities with Kogami. Shiotani wanted to rebuild Akane's and Kogami's relationship returns even if they belonged to a different organisation. The scenes in which the two of them appear together came together naturally. He reflected that Kogami is frank about his voice without paying attention about how he is received while Akane is more straightforward. Shiotani wanted strong scenes about their relationship shaped by the entire franchise. Saiga's death scene was one of the hardest to animate, most notably the expression Akane performs upon seeing him. Saiga's voice actor was worried about the impact the character would live in the protagonist. The fight scenes between Kogami and Kai were carefully animated to focus more on them than the backgrounds being affected by the strong weather.

Kogami's characterization was set up since the third Sinners of the System movie with the character searching for another chance at life after his revenge story from the first arc. Meanwhile, Akane Tsunemori was written to also be taken seriously due to her age. One of Kogami's lines of comfort to Akane is a direct reference to the first television series which helps to take back their original dynamic. Shiotani in particular cited the elevator scene involving the two leads talking as his favorite one. Initially, Kogami was written as a mentor figure to Tsunemori which the film recreates. While the franchise started with a season involving Akane and Kogami, the staff believes Providence serves as a good ending point as the duo reunite to solve another case together. Though the film primarily focuses on Akane, Ubakata believes it also carries Kogami's character arc from a traumatized man to a more righteous man thanks to being assisted by several characters, surpassing his feelings about Shogo Makishima.

=== Design ===
Sketches of Kogami by Akira Amano

Kogami's character was designed by manga artist Akira Amano. Amano said that she began with a black-haired man in a suit and, although she was limited in expressing his characteristics with his clothing, she was finally able to include some individuality in each of her characters. She made the main male lead's design distinctive with a simple police uniform. Yuki Kubota found the character muscular enough for him train in order to properly portray him in the stage adaptation.

Character designer Kyoji Asano emphasized contrast when illustrating Kogami and Tsunemori: Kogami wields a weapon freely with one hand while Tsunemori wields it with both hands indicative of her lack of experience. Asano further stated that Kogami was the easiest character to draw due to his tendency to express an angered reaction. As a lead character, Asano felt like she could care about him. Wanting the series to be "anti-moe", the production team avoided showing Tsunemori removing her clothes, and instead featured scenes where Kogami would remove his.

For the film Psycho-Pass: The Movie Kogami's visual appearance was slightly altered. In adapting Amano's design under Shiotani's direction, animator Naoyuki Onda was told to draw Kogami in order to make him look stronger. This was done not only through his physical appearance but also his facial expression and hair. However, he believes in the end stayed true to Amano's artworks. He used multiple designs based on real life in regards to military clothing as it was something he was not used to draw. As a result, the military clothing Kogami wears in the movie was made by designers he called Furukawa and Ishiwata. Due to Kogami being tortured by Rutaganda in the movie, Onda commented he made such damaged appearance more revised based on Shiotani's suggestions. Kana Hanazawa said that female viewers should look forward to Kogami's scenes where he does not wear a shirt, as the actress noted him to have a strong sex appeal.

=== Voice actors ===
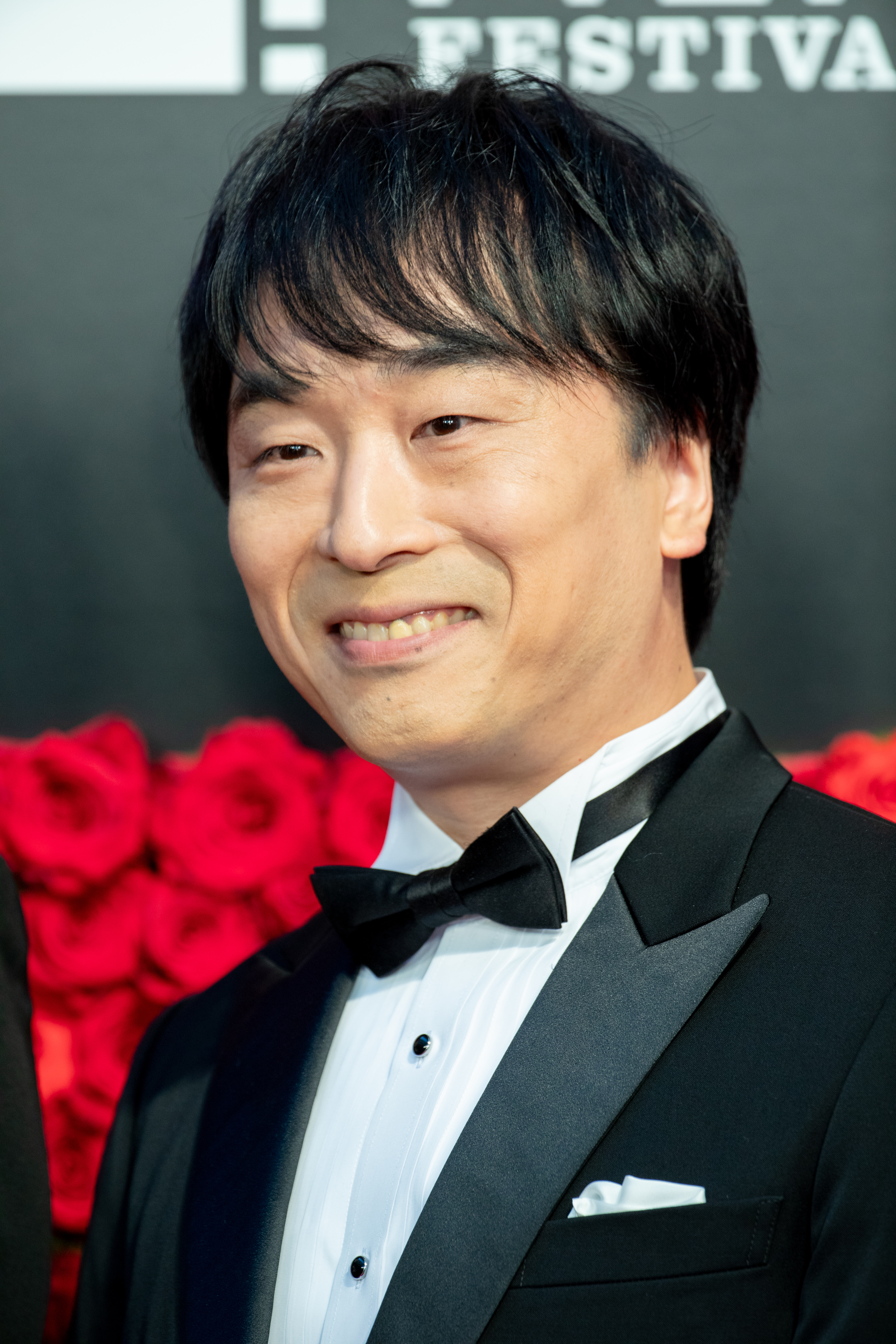
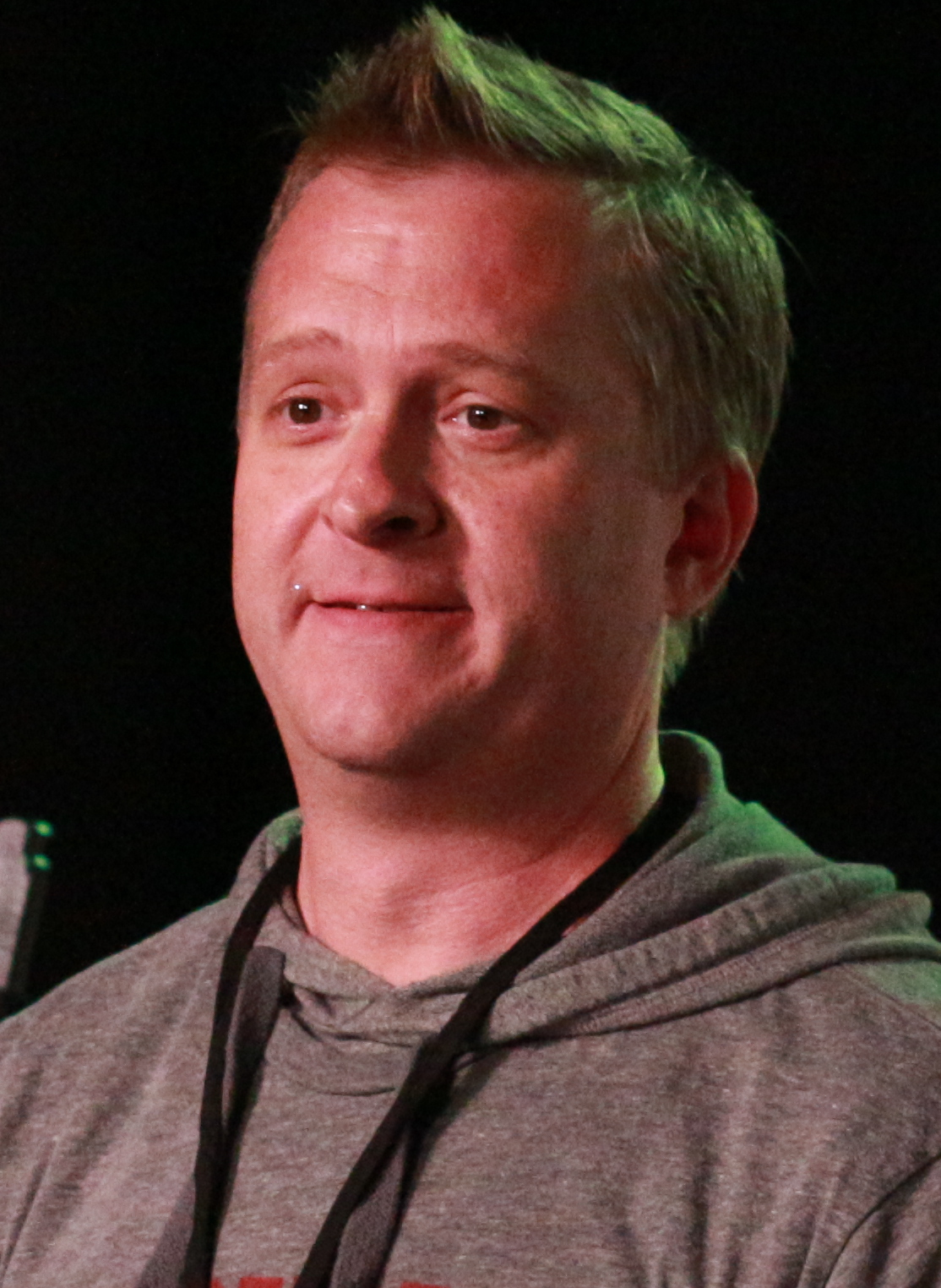
Tomokazu Seki (left) and Robert McCollum voiced Kogami in the anime's Japanese and English versions, respectively.

Shinya Kogami is voiced in Japanese by Tomokazu Seki who was cast by Katsuyuki Motohiro during auditions for the series. Seki had little knowledge about the series' premise and was originally cast in the role of Nobuchika Ginoza, but ended up as Kogami. Seki has stated that he enjoyed the role and the anime, believing that Kogami would be a second season protagonist strong enough to defeat the new antagonist, Kirito Kamui. However, Kogami only appears in the second season as Tsunemori's hallucination when she dwells upon dealing with Kirito Kamui. In said hallucination, Kogami is pleased with the impact his character has on the inspector.

Because production of the 2015 film did not begin until late in the second anime's production, cast members were concerned that Kogami had been killed off-screen. They were relieved to see Kogami appear as a major character in the movie.

Shiotani decided to have the foreigners speak English, in contrast with other films in which they typically speak Japanese. Seki and Kana Hanazawa (Tsunemori) were surprised at this proposal since they had multiple English lines in the end. The idea Shiotani wished to explore within the film was what happens when a confined society is expanded into other countries, bringing chaos rather than peace, which would make the audience further question this ideal. Seki says that Kogami is now less brooding than in the first season because he is no longer governed by revenge. The reunion of Kogami and Tsunemori is one of Seki's favorite scenes because their deep relationship is demonstrated when they wordlessly share a cigarette.

By the time Sinners of the System was released, Seki still appreciated Kogami's handling, but felt pressured by the character's popularity with fans. The handling of Kogami with the young Tenzing had a slightly Showa-like atmosphere and was interesting according to Seki. Seki kept noticing a theme within the movies that Kogami has killed several enemies despite still showing emotions that makes the character look like he is doing the right action. Furthermore, Seki looked forward to more interactions between Kogami and Ginoza due to their bond and similar philosophies in regards to the ideas of what makes a detective. With Providence, Seki claimed that Kogami's and Akane's interaction was appealing, enough to give the franchise a proper closure.

Kogami is voiced in English by Robert McCollum, who said that Psycho-Pass is "always a favorite" for fans. "In terms of good guys, [it is] tough to get much more low-key than Kogami," he said, describing the character as calm.

== Appearances ==
=== Psycho-Pass ===
Shinya Kogami is introduced as one of several protagonists of the anime series, Psycho-Pass. Set in a dystopian future, the series focuses on the use of the Sibyl System: a bio-mechanical character that employs psychometric scanners that calculate the likelihood of a person committing a crime. Its results are known as a Crime Coefficient. Kogami is an Enforcer, a police officer who assists and protects the Inspectors sent to investigate crime scenes and to pursue individuals with high Crime Coefficient readings. Enforcers are themselves latent criminals with high Crime Coefficients who are monitored by Inspectors that are authorized to kill Enforcers, if necessary. Kogami is originally an Inspector who works with Mitsuru Sasayama, who is mutilated and killed by Shogo Makishima, after which Kogami becomes obsessed with solving the case leading to his Crime Coefficient rising and subsequent demotion.

With Tsunemori's assistance, Kogami learns that Makishima killed Sasayama. Kogami and Tsunemori arrest Makishima, whose goal is to disable the Sibyl System. Makishima escapes and Kogami leaves his team, an illegal act, to give chase and to kill the man on his own. With the help of his mentor, Joji Saiga, Kogami kills Makishima before the latter is able to commit an act of bio-terrorism, after which the Sibyl System orders Tsunemori to capture Makishima alive and for Kogami to be executed as a runaway criminal. Kogami escapes and is last seen in a ship reading a book. In the After Stories audio drama, Kogami contacts Tsunemori, telling her that he is withdrawing from society in order to avoid detection.

=== Psycho-Pass: The Movie ===
In the 2015 film, Psycho-Pass: The Movie, Kogami lives in the Southeast Asia Union, a superstate which has begun to import the Sibyl System technology, using the city known as Shambala Float as its testing ground. Kogami leads a guerilla resistance to the system's implementation. When Tsunemori goes to Shambala Float to confront him, they end up collaborating to uncover the identity of the union's upcoming president. Attacked by mercenaries, they are rescued by Tsunemori's team. Kogami and Ginoza reunite to defeat the mercenaries' leader, Desmond Rutaganda. They part after Rutaganda's death and Kogami remains with his new group in the hope of a more peaceful life.

=== Psycho-Pass: Sinners of the System ===
In the 2019 films Psycho-Pass: Sinners of the System, Kogami first appears as an hallucination Ginoza has when being wounded in combat while recalling their bond. A younger Kogami appears in the second film, fighting against a droid that was programmed by a potential criminal. For the third film which takes place after Psycho-Pass: The Movie, Kogami is portrayed as the protagonist. The third and final film, Case.3 Onshuu no Kanata ni (On the Other Side of Love and Hate) focuses on Shinya Kogami as he travels the Tibet-Himalaya region as a free-lance mercenary. He meets the young part-Japanese girl Tenzing Wangchuk who asks him to teach her fighting skills so she can take revenge on the murderer of her parents. Kogami agrees but only for selfdefense, afraid that she will become like him after killing Makishima. He encounters Frederica Hanashiro of the Japanese Ministry of Foreign Affairs, ostensibly looking for kim, Japanese who have been stranded outside the country with the aim of returning them home if they have a good hue. During peace negotiations, Tenzing tracks her father's killer to a meeting with Garcia who is secretly sabotaging the negotiations. He badly wounds her, but she informs Kogami of Garcia's plan. Frederica assists Kogami on the condition he works with her, so after he kills Garcia, he returns with her to Japan.

=== Psycho-Pass 3 ===
In the 2019 series Psycho-Pass 3, Kogami returns to Tokyo, where he and fellow demoted Inspector Nobuchika Ginoza now work for the Ministry of Foreign Affairs Operations Department. They warn Inspectors Arata Shindo and Kei Mikhail Ignatov about the "foxes," individuals who should be arrested. He reappears in the finale where Unit One, headed by Chief Mika Shimotsuki, meets with the Suppressing Action Group of the MFA Operations Department to discuss the criminal organization called Bifrost. Bifrost is behind a series of societal manipulations and mass murders, their latest plot being to murder Karina Komiya, the governor of Tokyo. Kogami's last scene is with an imprisoned Tsunemori, the two agreeing to meet again to share what has happened in their lives since last they met. Kogami determines to save Tsunemori from imprisonment because he is aware it is Sybil who trapped her. In the 2020 film, Psycho-Pass 3: First Inspector, Kogami continues his fight against Bifrost. Following its defeat, he invites a freed Tsunemori for a meal.

=== Other appearances ===
Kogami appears in the manga, Inspector Akane Tsunemori, an adaptation of the first anime season, and is the title character of the prequel novel, Inspector Shinya Kogami, which follows the case that leads to Sasayama's death. Fukami also wrote a novel focusing on his actions and thoughts through the first anime season. Kogami also appears in the series' self-parody manga, Gakuen Psycho-Pass by Shiina Soga, and is a supporting character in the visual novel, Psycho-Pass: Mandatory Happiness. In the butai-ban, Kogami is played by Yuki Kubota. The character also appears in Psycho-Pass branded merchandise.

== Reception ==
=== Popularity ===
Kogami has been well received by fans and reviewers, evidenced by his receipt of the "Mister Noitamina" award in a poll ranking the popularity of characters on Fuji TV's Noitamina programming block. He was voted the sixth-best male character in Newtype's anime awards. In another poll by the same magazine, Kogami was voted the 24th-most-popular male anime character of the 2010s. Kogami and Tsunemori received two percent of a website poll regarding characters fans hoped would become a couple. His role in Sinners of the System gave him the top place in a 2019 Newtype poll. In a 2019 Anime! Anime! poll, Kogami was tied with Whitebeard from One Piece for eighth place as the character fans wanted to have as their boss.

=== Critical response ===
Critical reception of Kogami has been positive. As the series' protagonist, his role was interesting due to his enigmatic qualities. He often interacts with Tsunemori, making him more likable in the process. According to David West of Neo, Kogami felt like the more leading character than Tsunemori. Meanwhile, the character was also compared him with the comic-book character Judge Dredd from the series 2000 AD, as well as Homura Akemi from Madoka Magica due to their enigmatic personalities from the first episodes and dynamic with the other protagonists from their respective series also written by the same person. Richard Eisenbeis of Kotaku, however, called him a "static character" who lacked Tsunemori's development across the series. The two fights between Kogami and Makishima were generally well-received based on the handling of the setting and usage of weaponry. However, the idea that Kogami was close to becoming a corrupted person like Makishima was often felt forced.

In his review of Psycho-Pass: The Movie, Jacob Chapman enjoyed Kogami's interactions with Tsunemori, but criticized the hallucination scene in which he talks with the dead Makishima; however, he liked the character quoting writer Frantz Fanon. Anticipating the film, IGN writer Miranda Sanchez expected to see interactions between Kogami and Tsunemori which were absent from Psycho-Pass 2. Sanchez called Kogami's role primarily one of fan service, writing that the developers did not use the duo's bond to its full potential with the final fight focused on Kogami. Alexandria Hill of Otaku USA praised the first interactions between Kogami and Tsunemori as it contrasted with their dialogue early in the film. Anime UK News and Rice Digital called Robert McCollum and Kate Oxley the best English actors in the dub.

Robert Frazer of UK Anime Network praised Kogami's role in the prequel manga, Psycho-Pass: Inspector Shinya Kogami, due to his interactions with others, finding it more appealing than Tsunemori's role in the anime's sequel. Kogami was noted by critics to have a different characterization in the manga that distanced his cold personality from the first television series which helps to provide major depths to his character as his younger days are explored. In retrospect, Comic Bastard called Kogami as a breakout character based on his role in the first series comparing him to other popular characters as Dirty Harry and Wolverine among others and thus felt that his characterization in the manga was flat for removing the traits of the anime series that appealed to the audience.

An Anime News Network reviewer enjoyed the 2019 film's deeper characterization of Kogami, whose feelings about villain Makishima makes him "the franchise's breakout male lead and perhaps the series' most popular character." Medium claimed that the third movie had the most entertaining story for hidden depths and appealing nature give to Kogami when training Tenzing. The book, Law and Justice in Japanese Popular Culture: From Crime Fighting Robots to Duelling Pocket Monsters, notes that Kogami is surprised by Tsunemori's thoughts about the Sybil System—although she approves of the status quo, she does not value the system that monitors the series' world. The character has been compared with Charles Marlow in Joseph Conrad's 1899 novel, Heart of Darkness. Like Marlow, Kogami's obsessive hunt draws him close to his prey. After Kogami kills Makishima, he abandons his ideals and decides to flee Japan. Cassandra Holcombe from the Journal of Anime and Manga Studies said that Kogami's and Makishima's duels serve as counterparts to the exaggeration of violence the series employs with the transforming Dominators serving as examples. In The Paradoxical World of Psycho-Pass Anime Series, Natasha Harly and Liem Satya Limanta from Petra Christian University, the writer noted that while Kogami showed his deviant behavior through his setting since he began to think that one should not always obey what the Dominator told them to do. Universidad EAFIT said Kogami is the personification of contradicting values in regards to sacrifice; as a latent criminal, he lacks his own individualism as his sense of justice is rejected by society. Nevertheless, Kogami continues working for the law though even if his methods contradict other people's, most notably Akane. Kogami's corruption causes him to become a more antagonistic figure in later works as his own comrades are given the order to kill him.

Piunikaweb noted while Kogami and Ginoza appear in the movie, their inclusion feels more as fanservice to returning fans as the narrative focuses more on Psycho-Pass 3 new cast alongside Kanamori most notably, as they have to face Asusawa and stop him from killing the governor. Crunchyroll praised Seki's performance, most notably in the latest film Providence for being able to give Kogami the same tone he gave him previous works.
