= Psycho-Pass: The Movie =

2015 anime film directed by Katsuyuki Motohiro

- Official poster featuring Akane Tsunemori and Shinya Kogami

Japanese name
- Kanji: 劇場版 PSYCHO-PASS(サイコパス)
Transcriptions
- Revised Hepburn: Gekijō-ban Saiko Pasu
- Directed by: Katsuyuki Motohiro; Naoyoshi Shiotani
- Screenplay by: Gen Urobuchi; Makoto Fukami
- Story by: Gen Urobuchi
- Produced by: Kōji Yamamoto; Akitoshi Mori; Masaya Saitou; Fumi Morihiro; Kenji Tobori
- Starring: Kana Hanazawa; Tomokazu Seki; Hiroshi Kamiya; Ayane Sakura; Kenji Nojima; Shizuka Itō
- Cinematography: Eiji Arai
- Edited by: Yoshinori Murakami
- Music by: Yugo Kanno
- Production company: Production I.G
- Distributed by: Toho
- Release date: January 9, 2015
- Running time: 113 minutes
- Country: Japan
- Language: Japanese
- Box office: $7,683,799

Psycho-Pass: The Movie (Japanese: 劇場版 PSYCHO-PASS(サイコパス), Hepburn: Gekijō-ban Saiko Pasu) is a 2015 Japanese anime science fiction crime film produced by Production I.G. It features the voices of Kana Hanazawa, Tomokazu Seki, Hiroshi Kamiya, Ayane Sakura, Kenji Nojima, and Shizuka Itō. Set in a dystopia, the film focuses on inspector Akane Tsunemori, the Public Safety Bureau's Criminal Investigation Division Inspector, who finds a picture of Shinya Kogami who left Japan in the television series Psycho-Pass. As Kogami has trained criminals, the inspector travels to the Southeast Asia Union (SEAUn) to investigate and arrest him. Psycho-Pass: The Movie premiered in Japan on January 9, 2015.

The film was directed by Naoyoshi Shiotani and Katsuyuki Motohiro (the latter serving as chief director), and co-written by Gen Urobuchi and Makoto Fukami. The staff had the idea of Tsunemori finding a renegade Kogami based on other films they had watched. The staff found the platonic relationship between the two lead characters appealing due to their trust in each other. The film has been licensed by Funimation; it was given a limited screening and was released on home media in English-speaking countries. Madman Entertainment and Anime Limited released it in Australia and the United Kingdom, respectively.

Psycho-Pass: The Movie received generally positive critical responses due to building up the lore, the handling of the new setting, and the dynamic between the two leads. The English and Japanese voice actors were praised for their work. The film received criticism for not concluding the storylines presented in the first television series and for ignoring an unfinished character arc of Kogami. The film won two Newtype Anime Awards in 2015 and grossed a total of US$7,683,799 in Japan.

== Plot ==
Akane Tsunemori and her allies from the Public Safety Bureau's Criminal Investigation Department fight in an operation against foreign terrorists who have infiltrated Japan and recover images of their former colleague Shinya Kogami. The terrorists originate from the Southeast Asia Union (SEAUn), a superstate led by Chuang Han which has begun to import the Sibyl System technology from Japan, in order to arrest "latent criminals". Tsunemori is granted permission to travel to the SEAUn; she is received by a military procession under the supervision of Colonel Nicholas Wong. Wong tells Tsunemori their guns, called Dominators, are not used in the country and that due to a lack of resources, latent criminals are instead fitted with collars that will deliver a lethal dose of poison if they are disobedient. Tsunemori accompanies Wong and his men on a military operation outside Shambala Float. During a battle, she finds Kogami, and they are forced to flee together after Wong's drones attack Kogami. They go to the base of the terrorists, who are fighting to free their nation from Han's military dictatorship and the Sibyl System. Meanwhile, Wong contacts mercenary leader Desmond Rutaganda and hires his team to find Tsunemori and Kogami.

Kogami suspects a conspiracy is unfolding, due to Han's alliance with Sibyl and that the terrorists in Japan were not sent by their movement. Rutaganda and his mercenaries attack the camp, killing many of the resistance fighters. Kogami helps Tsunemori escape before he is captured. At Shambala Float, Tsunemori realizes the Sibyl System in Shambala Float has been tampered with and programmed to ignore Wong and the rest of the city's military, allowing them to act with impunity despite being latent criminals with elevated Crime Coefficients.

Wong and his men take Tsunemori to a helipad, where Rutaganda's group arrives with a wounded Kogami. Rutaganda plans to have them both executed and then use the helicopter to stage their deaths to look like a Japanese terrorist caused them as part of a false flag operation to increase his own military power. The drones, which have been reset by Tsunemori's ally, Shion Karanomori, to accurately detect their Crime Coefficients, turn on Wong's men. Just then, the rest of Division One arrives with Nobuchika Ginoza killing Wong. In the ensuing battle, all of Wong's men are killed, except Rutaganda. Kogami pursues Rutaganda, urging Tsunemori to go after Han to discover the truth about the conspiracy.

Kogami fights Rutaganda but he is overwhelmed until Ginoza appears and together kill him. Han is found to be a criminally asymptomatic Sibyl android. Sibyl tells Tsunemori they engineered the chain of events, creating a need for the system in the SEAUn. Tsunemori still demands Han's resignation and a free and fair election. The Sibyl System grants her wish. The next day, Han claims Wong's failed coup has caused him to rethink his government and announce his resignation so an election can be held. The SEAUn in the hands of the uncorrupt military while Division One returns to Japan with Ginoza having let Kogami escape.

In a post-credits scene, Kogami overhears a radio broadcast revealing Han is winning the election. The film concludes with a voice-over by Tsunemori, promising that someday the value of the Sibyl System will be examined.

== Cast ==
Characters	Japanese voice actor	English dubbing actor
Akane Tsunemori	Kana Hanazawa	Kate Oxley
Shinya Kogami	Tomokazu Seki	Robert McCollum
Nobuchika Ginoza	Kenji Nojima	Jessie James Grelle
Mika Shimotsuki	Ayane Sakura	Cherami Leigh
Yayoi Kunizuka	Shizuka Itō	Lindsay Seidel
Sho Hinakawa	Takahiro Sakurai	Z. Charles Bolton
Shion Karanomori	Miyuki Sawashiro	Lydia Mackay
Teppei Sugo	Hiroki Touchi	Mike McFarland
Joji Saiga	Kazuhiro Yamaji	Michael Federico
Dominator	Noriko Hidaka	Stephanie Young
Nicholas Wong	Hiroshi Kamiya	Jason Liebrecht
Desmond Rutaganda	Unshō Ishizuka	Major Attaway

== Production ==
=== Conception and scenario ===
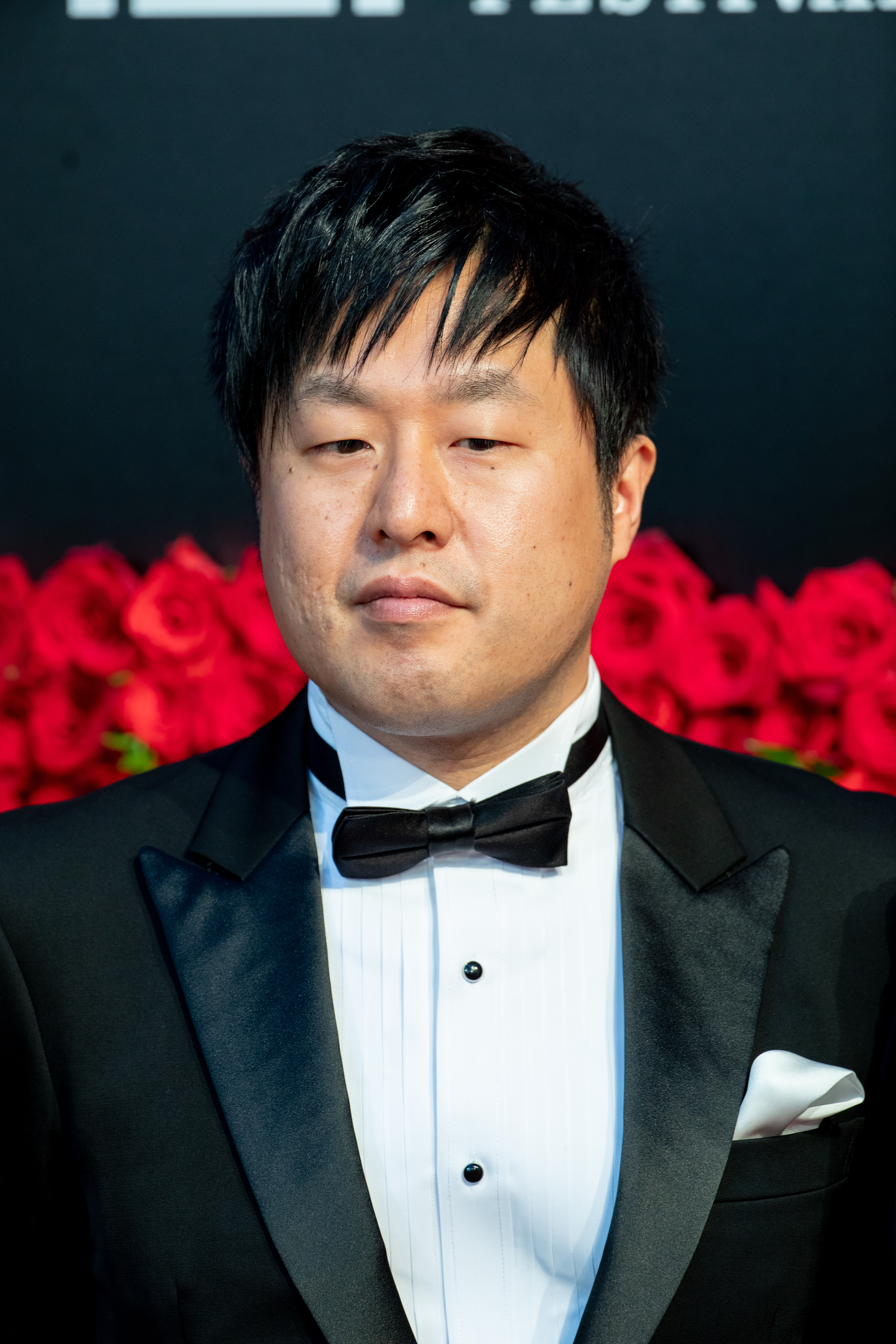
Director Naoyoshi Shiotani conceived the film's idea during the final episodes of the first anime series.

During the final episodes of the anime series Psycho-Pass director Naoyoshi Shiotani conceived the idea of a Psycho-Pass] film. Writer Gen Urobuchi and chief director Katsuyuki Motohiro said the film would have to contain a scenario independent of Japan's Sibyl System society. Shiotani wanted to create the film in collaboration with the staff who had worked on season one of the series, and with character designer Naoyuki Onda and art director Shuichi Kusamori, who also worked on the series. Urobuchi believed the ideal sequel would be a film rather than a television series but wanted to stay true to the roots of the original series. In contrast to Psycho-Pass, in which the detectives' cases are mostly solved without gruesome imagery, the film's writers Makoto Fukami and Urobuchi agreed the film would portray more grisly scenes using guns. The film was set in another country because the guns provided by the Sibyl System mostly paralyzed enemies rather than killing them. This later led to the idea of a scenario involving mercenaries.

Fukami was personally requested by Shiotani to work in the film despite his initial doubts. Urobuchi early conceived the idea of using military people as characters in the film. Fukami claimed that he was inspired by Urobuchi's work, which resulted him in doing research in order to help in building up the world scenario. Speaking together, Urobuchi said that one is weaknesses is that he writes too much of the script. He claims Fukami can write chaos in a good sense, or something that does not come out in a rational way. Though noise in a sense, but that is why he can write a script that is filled with the emotions of the character and has unexpected aspects. It was such brilliance that made him feel surprised. As a result, he finds Fukami's work appealing for the movie, especially with how organized is his writing. Fukami has been credited too with the way the characters interact.

Motohiro said despite the multiple tasks Shiotani had, he surpassed any type of problem so he believed he succeeded in the making of the film. Urobuchi drew inspiration from the anime film Patlabor 2: The Movie (1993) and the television series Armored Trooper Votoms while handling the Sci-Fi mecha from the story and the tragedy they could bring upon civilization. Although he was not a part of the show's main staff, writer Tow Ubukata compared the story with the Khmer Rouge rule of Cambodia due to the similarities between the fictional society and the real one.

The staff's main idea was Akane finding the renegade Kogami, which was influenced by the original video animation series Mobile Suit Gundam: The 08th MS Team and the Western films Apocalypse Now (1979) and Saving Private Ryan (1998). The explosions in Apocalypse Now had a major impact on the film. Tsunemori's search for Kogami was influenced by these films because the staff believed this scenarios would appeal to both genders; Shiotani also wanted adult viewers to be able to enjoy it. Shiotani was confident because Urobuchi was writing the script; he believed Urobuchi was skilled at creating these kinds of scenarios. The non-romantic relationship between the protagonists was viewed as appealing by the staff because of the trust they have in each other. The duo was stated to resemble Sumire Onda and Shunsaku Aoshima, the lead characters of the Japanese police comedy-drama Bayside Shakedown. Because it happens in the previous anime series, Tsunemori's character was changed so she could fight on her own. The staff felt Hanazawa portrayed her character well in the film. Fukami wanted the action scenes to be depicted as appealingly as possible in the film, something which Urobuchi requested ever since the making of the movie.

=== Casting ===
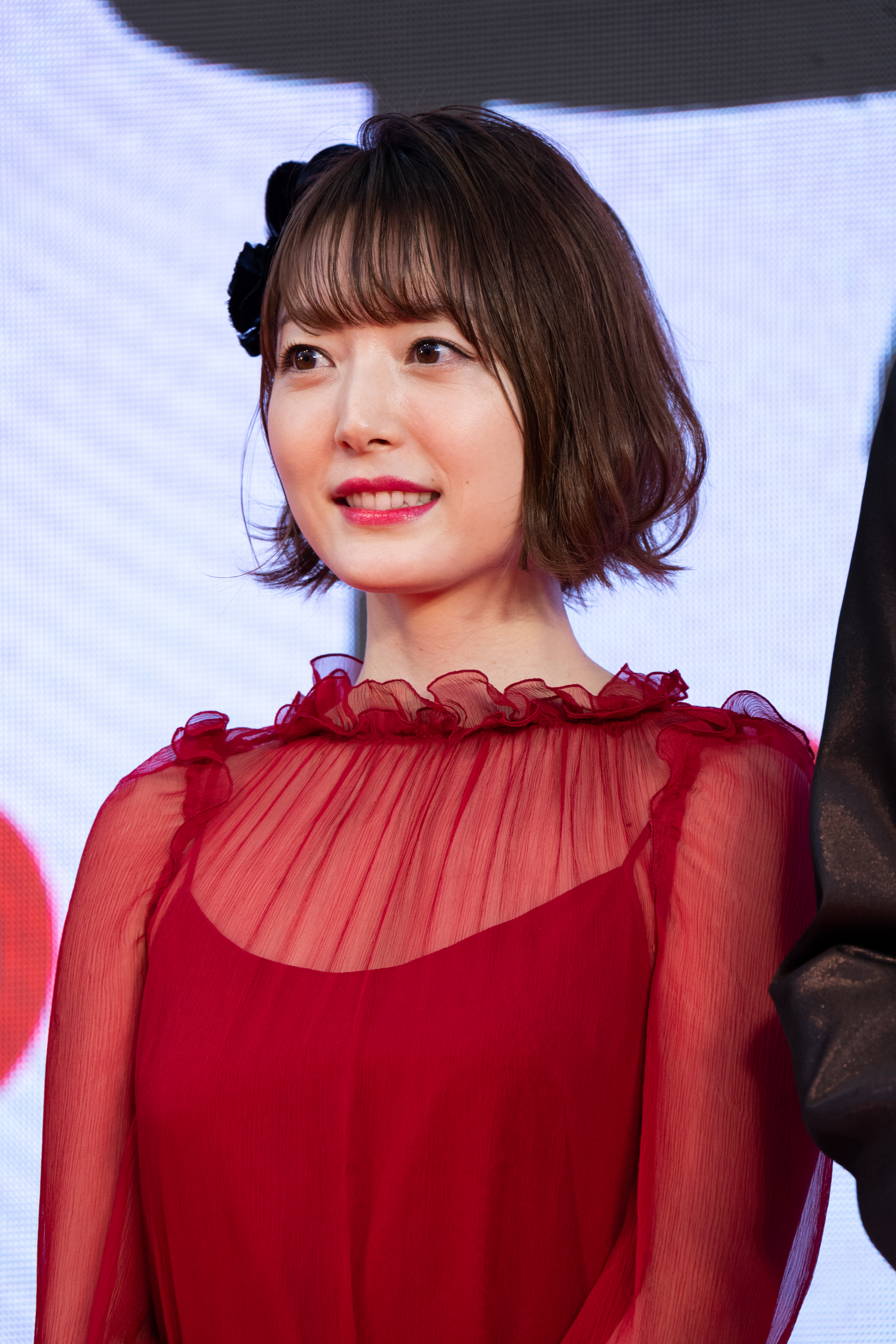
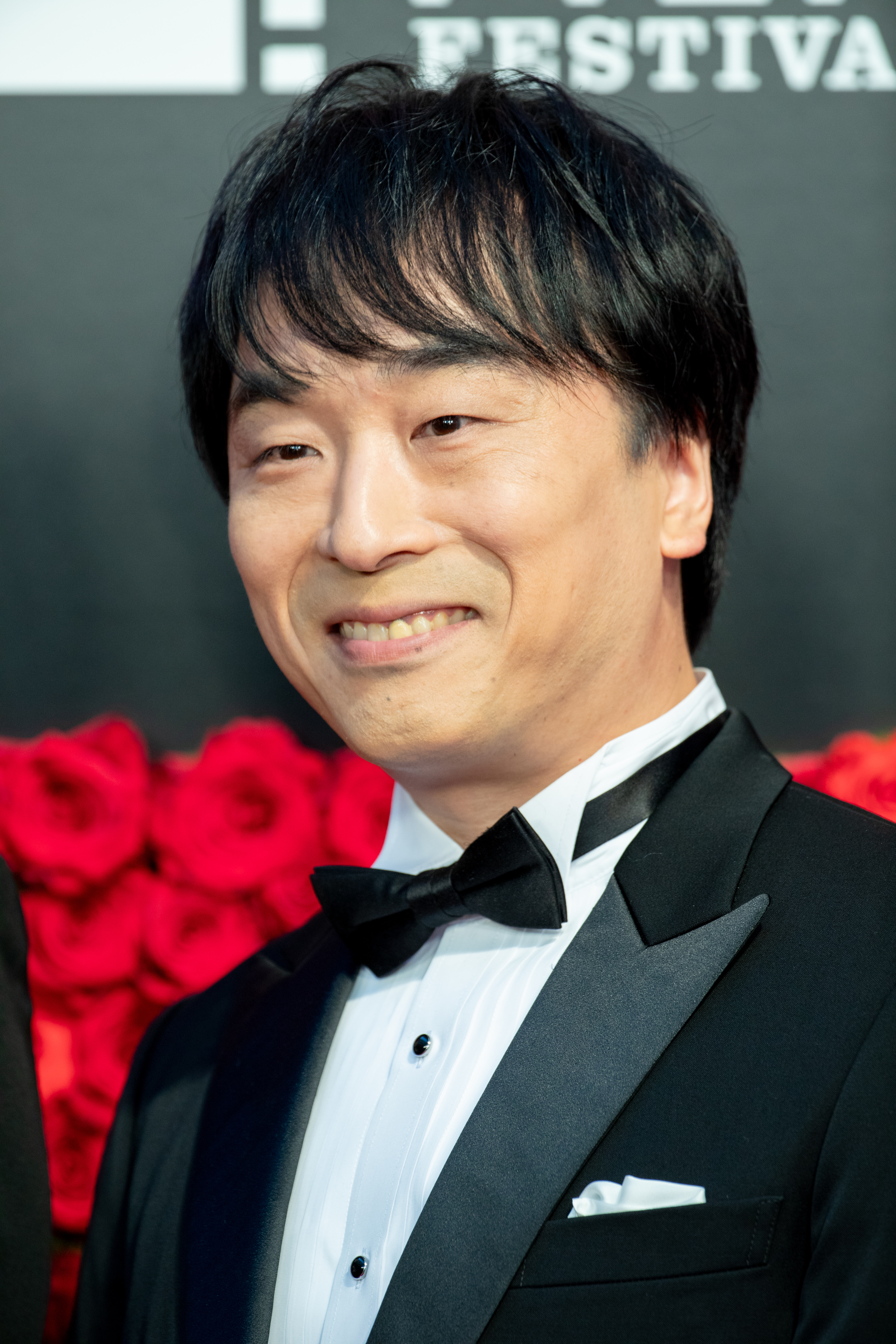
Kana Hanazawa and Tomokazu Seki, the Japanese actors who voiced Akane Tsunemori and Shinya Kogami, respectively

To make the story more realistic, Shiotani decided to have the foreigners speak English, in contrast with other films, in which they instead speak Japanese. Both lead actors Tomokazu Seki (Kogami) and Kana Hanazawa (Tsunemori), were surprised at this proposal because they had multiple English lines. Shiotani wished to explore what happens when a confined society expands into other countries, bringing chaos rather than peace, which would make the audience further question this ideal.

In an official pamphlet, staff members share their view of both the similarities and differences between Kogami and the first series' antagonist, Shogo Makishima, much of it regarding Kogami's psychological growth. Fukami describes Kogami as the type of person who is happy to encounter those with bad intentions because "he just loves justice." Urobuchi, on the other hand, notes that Kogami lacks Makishima's panoramic vision and that he is "just a loser." Because the voice recording for the 2015 film started at a later time, members of the cast were afraid Kogami had been killed off-screen. Only Hanazawa and Seki had information about the film during its conception. For the second anime, Psycho-Pass 2, the recording cast left an empty chair in the studio for Kogami; after this, Tsunemori's actor said Seki should return to record his part for the film, which was Kogami's official return. Seki felt Kogami became less brooding than he had been in the first series because he is no longer attached to the idea of revenge. Hanazawa said her character had changed after the two television series. The reunion between Kogami and Tsunemori was one of Seki's favorite scenes because the characters interact by smoking a cigarette without talking, showing their deep relationship. Seki was impressed by the film's premise because it explores the difficulties of handling the Sibyl System in another area.

Among other actors, Hiroshi Kamiya originally auditioned for the first Psycho-Pass television series but failed to get a role. Shiotani looked over Kamiya's works when casting him for Nicholas Wong. Kamiya ended enjoying the themes provided in the movie, believing the audience will enjoy it. In regards to fanservice, Hanazawa said that female viewers should look forward to Kogami's scenes where he does not wear a shirt, as the actress noted him to have a strong sex appeal. When the film project was announced, the cast were relieved Kogami survived after his disappearance in the first series. Shiotani wanted Ginoza to have a different hairstyle to highlight his changes since his debut. Urobuchi wrote Nobuchika Ginoza as a more sympathetic toward both Akane and Kogami in contrast to his antisocial self from the 2012–2013 series. His actor, Kenji Nojima said excited by this movie, primarily due to the rules of the setting and how the narrative has affected his character across the years.

=== Previews and marketing ===
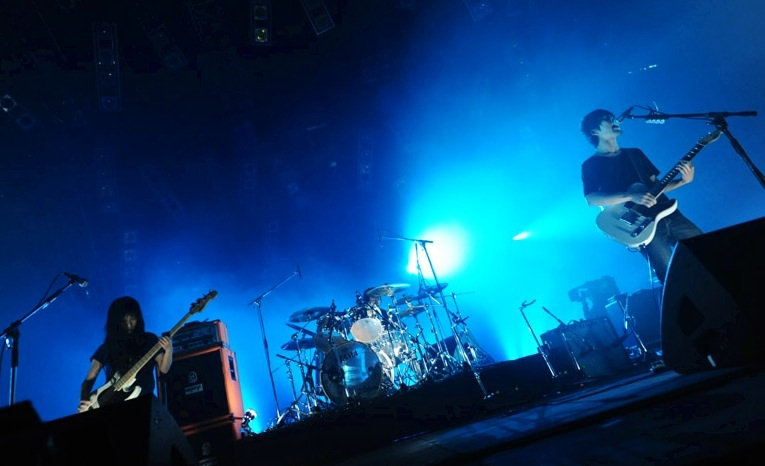
Ling Tosite Sigure performed the film's theme.

In September 2013, it was announced on the official website of Noitamina that a second season of Psycho-Pass and a new, original, theatrical film project were in development. The film was rated R15+in Japan due to its scenes of violence, which include murder and damage to the human body; Nitroplus president Takaki Kosaka was relieved it was not rated R18+. In September 2014, it was announced that the film's release date would be January 9, 2015, and that it would be run in over 100 theaters in Japan., A 30-second trailer showing Kogami, Akane, and Ginoza was streamed on Nico Nico Douga on September 5, 2013. A two-minute trailer, the second promotional video for the film, was released in September 2013; it contains footage from the original anime television series. The film has a running time of 113 minutes.

The film's theme song is "Who What Who What", which is performed by Ling Tosite Sigure. The song was released as a single on December 19, 2014. In January 2015 during a performance of the theme, parts had to be changed due to similarities with a recent terrorist attack. The lines "Chi darake no jiyū ga" (Freedom covered in blood) and "Moroha no knife ni irodorareta" (Colored by a double-edged knife) were changed to "Maboroshi no jiyū ga" (Imaginary freedom) and "Moroha no fake ni irodorareta" (Colored by a double-edged fake), respectively. The ending theme is "The Monster With No Name" (名前のない怪物, Namae no Nai Kaibutsu) by Egoist, which is also the first ending theme of the television series.

The film was released on Blu-ray and DVD in Japan on July 15, 2015. A novelization written by Makoto Fukami was released in Japan in March 2016 by Mag Garden.

In February 2016, Funimation released a preview of the English-language dub version of the film and announced it would be run in over 100 theaters in North America and Canada. Psycho-Pass: The Movie had a limited theatrical release in the United States on March 15–16, 2016. The film was released on home media formats on June 7, 2016. In the United Kingdom, the film was released both as a regular version and in a "Dual Format" package in October 2016. Madman Entertainment released the film in Australia on August 3, 2016. In May 2019, Funimation streamed the film on its channel, FunimationNow.

== Reception ==
=== Box office and sales ===
Psycho-Pass: The Movie was released in Japanese cinemas on January 9, 2015. The film was ranked 4th in its opening weekend, when it earned ¥136,899,100 yen from 93,164 admissions. It then grossed ¥247,582,300 (around US$2 million) from 171,545 admissions in four days. The film subsequently grossed over US$7 million (¥850 million) at the box office, with a total of $7,683,799.

After its home media release, Psycho-Pass: The Movie sold 24,000 units in its first week and topped Japan's Blu-ray sales chart. The DVD version was ranked 3rd with 6,000 units sold in the weekly DVD sales chart, becoming the top-selling DVD in the franchise. On January 22, 2019, the film premiered on Fuji TV, earning a rating of 0.9%.

=== Critical response ===
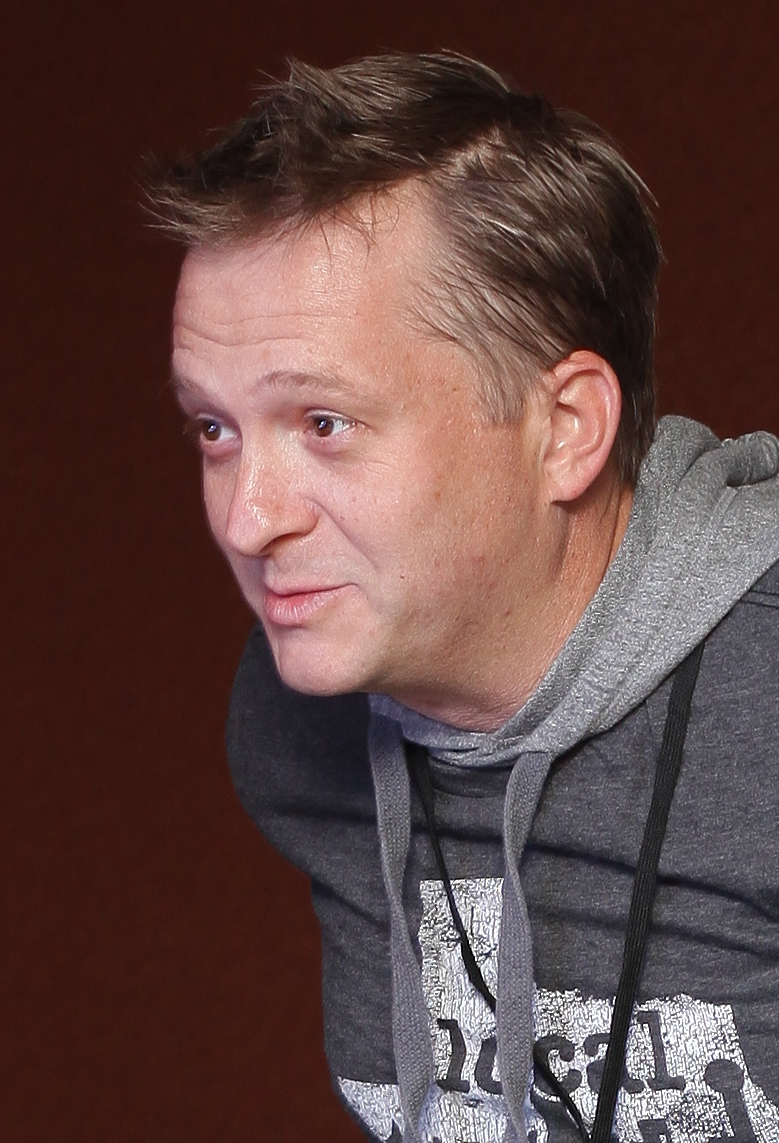
McCollum's performance as Kogami has been praised.

The film received positive reviews by multiple writers enjoyed the dynamic between the two main characters, Kogami and Tsunemori alongside the visuals, making them as one of the best aspects of the film alongside the visuals and fight scenes. Chris Beveridge of The Fandom Post praised the film's handling of multiple themes such as the military, society, and politics. Satisfied with the film, Beveridge said he looked forward to more Psycho-Pass media in the future; he felt the film surpassed the first Psycho-Pass television series, which he had enjoyed. Critics also questioned whether Psycho-Pass: The Movie provides a conclusion to the storyline from the main series, often comparing it with the two television series with both positive and negative response. IGN regarded the film as a form of fan service to Kogami because while his character arc is explored, his conclusion to the events from the first series is not revised.

Kotaku reviewer Richard Eisenbeis praised the settings to which Akane and Kogami have to adapt, in contrast to the Sibyl System explored in the first television series. The reviewer also commended the film's climax, in which supporting characters from the television series appear and are more likable compared to their earlier incarnations. UK Anime Network and Kotaku praised the scenario for showing the chaos other countries suffer in the new, futuristic dystopia instead of focusing again on the Sibyl System, making the story stand out. On the other hand, Rice Digital said it fails to live up to the status of the original Psycho-Pass series because it does not explore the Sibyl System. Asian Movie Impulse said that the film was benefitted from a larger budget than its predecessors making the setting and scenario stand out in the process.

Reviewers also commented on the cast of Psycho-Pass: The Movie. UK Anime Network enjoyed the performances of the Japanese voice actors, most notably Kana Hanazawa due to the stronger tone she provides for her character (Tsunemori) in comparison to that of the previous works; Hiroshi Kamiya's role (Nicholas Wong) was also regarded as appealing. The English-language voice acting was well received, with Anime UK News enjoying the performances of Robert McCollum (Kogami) and Kate Oxley (Tsunemori). Otaku USA liked both the Japanese and the English-language performances, saying the accented English dialogue is occasionally difficult to understand but makes the story feel more realistic.

=== Accolades ===
Year	Name of Competition	Category	Recipient	Result
2015	5th Newtype Anime Awards	Best Mecha Design	Psycho-Pass: The Movie	Nominated
2015	5th Newtype Anime Awards	Best Director	Naoyoshi Shiotani	Nominated
2015	5th Newtype Anime Awards	Best Voice Actress	Kana Hanazawa	Won
2015	5th Newtype Anime Awards	Best Character (Female)	Akane Tsunemori	Nominated
2015	5th Newtype Anime Awards	Best Picture (Film)	Psycho-Pass: The Movie	Won
2015	5th Newtype Anime Awards	Best Screenplay	Gen Urobuchi	Won
2016	Japan Sci-Fi Con's Seiun Award	Best Media	Psycho-Pass: The Movie	Nominated
2016	2nd Sugoi Japan Award	Animation division	Psycho-Pass: The Movie	Nominated
