= Lydia Mackay =

American voice actress

- Born: Lydia Marie Mackay; 1977 (age 48–49); Fort Worth, Texas, U.S.
- Occupation: Actress
- Years active: 1999–present
- Agent: Mary Collins Agency
- Notable work: Fullmetal Alchemist as Trisha Elric; Black Butler as Madam Red; Sekirei as Tsukiumi; Fairy Tail as Ultear Milkovich; Shakugan no Shana as Chigusa Sakai; Trinity Blood as Caterina Sforza; One Piece as Boa Hancock; Psycho-Pass as Shion Karanomori; Eden of the East as Sis; Attack on Titan as Nanaba

Lydia Marie Mackay (born 1977) is an American actress, known internationally for her work with Funimation, Crunchyroll, and OkraTron 5000. In addition to her work as a stage actress, she has voiced many English dubs of Japanese anime films and television series, as well as commercials, audiobooks, and video games.

== Early life ==
Mackay was born in Fort Worth, Texas, the second of three sisters.

== Filmography ==
=== Anime series ===
List of voice performances in anime series
Year	Title	Role	Notes	Ref.
2004	Fullmetal Alchemist	Trisha Elric/Juliet Douglas/Sloth		
2006	Black Cat	Sephiria Arks		
2008	One Piece	Laki, Boa Hancock	Funimation dub	
2010	Fullmetal Alchemist: Brotherhood	Trisha Elric		
2010	Hetalia: Axis Powers	Ukraine		
2010	Eden of the East	Sis		
2011	Black Butler	Madam Red		
2012	Sekirei	Tsukiumi		
2012	Ōkami-san and her Seven Companions	Yukime		
2012	Shiki	hizuru Kirishiki		
2012	Level E	Tachibana		
2012	Shakugan no Shana	Chigusa Sakai	Funimation dub, Seasons 2-3	
2013	Blood-C	Kanako Tsutsutori		
2013	Last Exile: Fam, the Silver Wing	Guzel		
2013	Tenchi Muyo! War on Geminar	Aura	Main role	
2014	Kamisama Kiss	Narukami		
2014	Jormungand	Amalia		
2014	Robotics;Notes	Mizuka Irei		
2014	Psycho-Pass	Shion Karanomori	Main role	
2014	Fairy Tail	Ultear		
2014	Code:Breaker	Kanda		
2014	A Certain Scientific Railgun S	Shina Kamijo		
2014	Attack on Titan	Nanaba		
2015	Wanna Be the Strongest in the World	Jackal Tojo		
2016	Shimoneta: A Boring World Where the Concept of Dirty Jokes Doesn't Exist	Sophia Nishikinomiya		
2017	Konohana Kitan	Yaobikuni		
2017	Gosick	Queen Coco Rose		
2017	Black Clover	Vanessa Enoteca	Recurring role	
2017	The Ancient Magus' Bride	Rahab		
2018	Kakuriyo: Bed and Breakfast for Spirits	Sasara		
2018	Senran Kagura Shinovi Master	Suzune		
2018	A Certain Magical Index III	Shizuri Mugino		
2019	One Piece 3D2Y: Overcoming Ace's Death! Luffy's Pledge to His Friends	Boa Hancock	Television special	
2019	Fruits Basket (2019)	Kyoko Honda		
2019	Afterlost	Tsuki		
2019	Kono Oto Tomare! Sounds of Life	Isaki Kudo		
2019	Nichijou – My Ordinary Life	Ms. Nakamura		
2019	One Piece: Episode of Skypiea	Raki/Laki	Television special	
2020	The Day I Became a God	Tokiko Narukami		
2022	Shikimori's Not Just a Cutie	Motoko		
2023	Trigun Stampede	Rosa		
2023	Am I Actually the Strongest?	Gizelotte		
2024	The Witch and the Beast	Ione		
2024	Demon Lord 2099	Kinohara		
2025	Solo Leveling: Arise from the Shadow	Sang-mi Ahn		
2026	Takopi's Original Sin	Shizuka's Mom		
2026	The Villainess Is Adored by the Prince of the Neighbor Kingdom	Iltiana		

=== Animation ===
- Red vs. Blue – Kalirama the Undying

=== Film ===
List of voice performances in film
Year	Title	Role	Notes	Ref.
1999	Chuck E. Cheese in the Galaxy 5000	Astrid	Direct-to-video live action film based on Charles Entertainment Cheese	
2011	Eden of the East Movie I: The King of Eden	Sis		
2011	Eden of the East Movie II: Paradise Lost	Sis		
2012	Fafner: Dead Aggressor: Heaven and Earth	Yoko Hazama		
2013	Shakugan no Shana: The Movie	Chigusa Sakai		
2013	Wolf Children	Souhei's Mother		
2016	Psycho-Pass: The Movie	Shion Karanomori		
2017	Black Butler	Hanae Watsuki		
2017	Genocidal Organ	CIA Staff		
2019	One Piece: Stampede	Boa Hancock		
2020	My Hero Academia: Heroes Rising	Slice		
2022	Fruits Basket: Prelude	Kyoko Honda		
2023	Psycho-Pass Providence	Shion Karanomori		

=== Video games ===
List of voice performances in video games
Year	Title	Role	Notes	Ref.
2009	Borderlands	Athena		
2011	Duke Nukem: Critical Mass	Fembot		
2012	Borderlands 2	Maliwan, Harchek, Doctor Samuels		
2014	Borderlands: The Pre-Sequel!	Athena, Maliwan		
2016	Battleborn	Ambra		
