= List of Psycho-Pass characters =

Promotional illustration for the series featuring from left to right: Karanamori, Kagari, Kunizuka, Kogami, Tsunemori, Ginoza and Mazaoka.

The cast of Psycho-Pass 2. From left to right, Ginoza, Hinakawa, Saiga, Tsunemori, Karanomori, Shimotsuki, Kunizuka and Togane.

Production I.G's anime series Psycho-Pass features characters designed by manga artist Akira Amano. The anime takes place in a dystopia where citizens are continuously assessed via omnipresent cymatic scans used to determine their mental state, personality, and the probability that they will commit crimes. The result of said reading is labeled one's Psycho-Pass.

Throughout its three seasons, viewers follow the members of Unit One (aka Division One) of the Ministry of Welfare Public Safety Bureau's Criminal Investigation Division supported by the Sibyl System.

== Creation and design ==
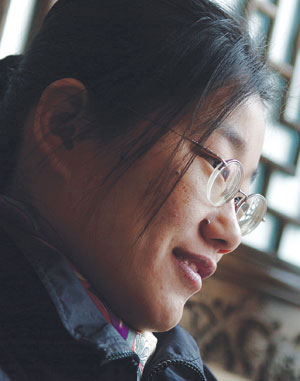
Character designer Akira Amano.

Director Naoyoshi Shiotani decided on how to make the series' characters after hearing comments from The Pet Girl of Sakurasou's director Atsuko Ishizuka. As that for that series the characters were designed first, Shiotani realized it was the opposite for them. They had to create the setting first and then continue with the characters as they "are almost being played by the world." As a result, the cast was designed by manga artist Akira Amano in order to make them balance with the dark atmosphere by having them "palatable and very relate-able." The staff also avoided using bright colors that would stand out. These designs were adapted by character designer Kyoji Asano.

Akane Tsunemori was created as the most relatable character who would question the setting from the audience's point of view and as the heroine who would come between Shinya Kogami and Shogo Makishima. Her growth in the series from an innocent rookie to a mature and haunted person was one of the staff's main objectives. Whenever an episode included violent scenes where the main characters were involved, the team worked on them to make them memorable. As the series was "anti-moe" the team decided to avoid having Akane remove her clothes and instead have Kogami do it. The staff also decided to focus more on friendships rather than romantic relationships. Voice actors have also been credited in the making of the series due to how they added traits to the characters.

== Criminal Investigation Division ==
Season One is seen through the eyes of Akane Tsunemori, a rookie Inspector in charge of solving cases with veteran Inspector Nobuchika Ginoza and their team of Enforcers, most notably Shinya Kogami, a former Inspector seeking vengeance on criminal Shogo Makishima. Tsunemori returns in Season Two as the leader of Unit One, with a re-organized team hunting down criminal Kirito Kamui. Psycho-Pass: The Movie has Tsunemori leaving Japan in order to bring her team to Shambala Float where she runs into her former ally, Kogami, now an expatriate become resistance fighter. The trilogy Sinners of the System tells independent stories that focus on some characters while the Season Three series introduces a new Unit One with Arata Shindo and Kei Mikhail Ignatov as rookie Inspectors who uncover a shadowy organization known as Bifrost.

=== Season 1 ===
==== Akane Tsunemori ====
Akane Tsunemori (Note: 常守 朱, Tsunemori Akane) is the 20-year-old main heroine – point-of-view character and the newly assigned Inspector of Unit One. She passes the exams with the highest score for employment on several public sectors and private corporations. She decides to join the police because it is the only place where no one obtained a score as high as hers, thus she believes she is able to do something there that no one else can. Though initially uncomfortable with her job, Kogami's joy of having somebody who would stop him from killing innocent people motivates her to work and get along with the Enforcers. Her calm demeanor, acceptance of society and will to fight to against conflicts prevent her from becoming a latent criminal despite her experiences. The members from the Sibyl System are attracted by her traits which results in her learning of their true nature as they want to use her to capture Makishima alive with Akane agreeing only if they stop their orders of killing the defecting Kogami. Although she fails, the Sibyl members allow her to live under the condition she does not reveal their truth. In the epilogue, Akane becomes the de facto leader of Unit One. Akane is seen briefing a newly recruited Inspector in the finale. She continues leveraging her position as a trusted Inspector with a personal connection to the Sibyl System until she is arrested before the start of Season 3, forcibly demoting her. She is voiced by Kana Hanazawa in Japanese and by Kate Oxley in English.

==== Shinya Kogami ====
Shinya Kōgami (Note: 狡噛 慎也, Kōgami Shin'ya) is the 28-year-old main protagonist and Enforcer in Unit One. Formerly an Inspector, his involvement in the Specimen Case caused his Crime Coefficient to rapidly increase to abnormal levels. While investigating the case, Mitsuru Sasayama, the Enforcer that worked under him, was on to the mastermind behind the case until he was killed in the same manner as the victims. Instead of seeking the needed therapy, Shinya became so focused on the case that he was demoted to Enforcer by the Sibyl System, restricting his freedom and limiting his movement to inside the Public Safety Bureau. Despite his violent actions, Kogami feels relaxed when Akane Tsunemori is assigned as his Inspector as he believes he will be a detective rather than a killer under her judgement. As an Enforcer, Kogami takes extensive physical training so that his superiors will not have to kill criminals. The two manage to arrest Makishima but following his escape, Kogami is taken off the case due to the Sibyl not wishing Makishima dead. As a result, Kogami leaves Unit One to hunt down and kill Makishima alone. He ultimately succeeds and is not seen again by his comrades, although in the audio drama After Stories he contacts Akane about how he will stay away from society in order to avoid being detected. He is voiced in Japanese by Tomokazu Seki and in English by Robert McCollum.

==== Nobuchika Ginoza ====
Nobuchika Ginoza (Note: 宜野座 伸元, Ginoza Nobuchika) is a veteran Inspector working with Akane. He coordinates all the Enforcers in Unit One. An old friend of Shinya's, his hatred for those with high Crime Coefficients and his zeal to oust them from society came from the inability to stop his former partner from becoming a latent criminal. Although he still holds a certain degree of trust with Shinya, he dislikes Shinya's Enforcer partner Masaoka, his father. His father's demotion to Enforcer causes Ginoza to constantly tell Akane to draw a line between herself and the Enforcers she works with. During the group's search for Makishima, Masaoka sacrifices his life to save his son from Makishima's dynamite and Ginoza loses an arm shortly afterwards. Ginoza's Crime Coefficient rises too high and he is demoted to an Enforcer, mirroring the fates of his father and Kogami. Despite this, Gen Urobuchi wrote Ginoza Nobuchika as a more sympathetic toward both Akane and Kogami for the 2015 movie where he assists the missing Kogami in a fight. In regards to the first Sinners of the System film, Shiotani picked Nobuchika Ginoza and Mika Shimotsuki as the main characters due to their similarities to the protagonists from the first television series, Shinya Kogami and Akane Tsunemori, respectively. Nevertheless, he noted this duo employed a different dynamic from Kogami and Akane while noting how Ginoza has undergone a notable character arc across the previous projects related to Psycho-Pass mainly due to his relationship with Masaoka and Kogami. He is voiced by Kenji Nojima in Japanese and Jessie James Grelle in English.

==== Tomomi Masaoka ====
Tomomi Masaoka (Note: 征陸 智己, Masaoka Tomomi) is the eldest Enforcer of Unit One. He is a hardworking and honest veteran who guides Akane in learning how the system works in the Public Safety Bureau. As a former detective, his distaste for the Sibyl System's absolute judgment caused his Psycho-Pass to deteriorate, resulting in his demotion to the rank of enforcer. Masaoka is Ginoza's father but their relationship is so dysfunctional the two rarely mention it. Nevertheless, Masaoka still cares for his son and guides him across the series, wishing he does not take the path he took. He is voiced by Kinryū Arimoto in Japanese and Jason Douglas in English.

==== Shusei Kagari ====
Shūsei Kagari (Note: 縢 秀星, Kagari Shūsei) is an Enforcer of Unit One who was detected as a latent criminal at the age of five. He is always telling jokes and sometimes teases, and flirts with Akane. Although he detests the system, Kagari is also annoyed by the criminals' actions. During Makishima's infiltration, Kagari finds out the true form of the Sibyl System when he is assigned to track one of Makishima's men. He is killed by the chief to keep the secret using Destroy-Decompose Dominator, erasing all traces of him. His fate remains unknown to all of his comrades except Akane as the Sibyl members make it appear he escaped. Akira Ishida voices Kagari in Japanese and Scott Freeman voiced him in English. In 2023, Freeman was replaced by Kyle Igneczi for the role of Kagari in Psycho-Pass: Sinners of the System.

==== Yayoi Kunizuka ====
Yayoi Kunizuka (Note: 六合塚 弥生, Kunizuka Yayoi) is the only female Enforcer of Unit One. She stays calm and collected in the face of even the most brutal crimes. She is a former guitarist in a Punk Rock band who became a latent criminal interacting with a terrorist named Rina. After unwittingly helping the bureau track Rina, the musician she was in love with, she joined the bureau to prevent other people from ending up like Rina. She and Shion have an intimate relationship. She is voiced by Shizuka Itō in Japanese and by Lindsay Seidel in English.

==== Shion Karanomori ====
Shion Karanomori (Note: 唐之杜 志恩, Karanomori Shion) is an analyst in the Public Safety Bureau's General Analysis Division and a latent criminal as well. She provides backup to the Enforcers and Inspectors in their investigation by analyzing the data and evidence sent by them. Shion is bisexual and the longtime lover of Yayoi. Miyuki Sawashiro voices her in Japanese and Lydia Mackay voices her in English.

==== Joshu Kasei ====
Jōshū Kasei (Note: 禾生 壌宗, Kasei Jōshū) is the Chief of the Bureau. She is depicted as an elderly woman who becomes interested in Shogo Makishima's immunity to the Dominators and orders Nobuchika Ginoza not to murder the criminal. When Makishima's assistant Choe Gu-sung tries to expose the truth behind the Sibyl System, Kasei kills him alongside the Enforcer trying to stop him, Shusei Kagari, to stop the leak of information. Kasei is revealed to be a cyborg that the members from the Sybil System use as an avatar with the current user being former criminal Kōzaburō Toma (藤間 幸三郎, Tōma Kōzaburō). Failing to invite Makishima to Sybil, Kozaburo is killed by the man and replaced with another member of the Sibyl who keeps ordering the Bureau. Kozaburo's backstory is explained in the prequel novel The Monster With No Name. Kasei is voiced by Yoshiko Sakakibara in Japanese and Linda Leonard voices her in English.

==== Mitsuru Sasayama ====
Mitsuru Sasayama (Note: 佐々山 光留, Sasayama Mitsuru) is an Enforcer who works at the MWPSB Unit 1 during flashbacks of the series as well as the light novel The Monster With No Name being dead during the anime series. His sister committed suicide for unknown reasons although Sasayama believes it was his abusive father's sexual assault on her. Sasayama fought against the man during the assault which resulted in him becoming a latent criminal. Despite his cocky and brute personality, Sasayama is a good friend of Kogami. During a case involving gruesome murders, Sasayama finds a lead to the mastermind, Shogo Makishima, but is brutally murdered in the process. The gruesome state of Sasayama's dead body causes Kogami to become a latent criminal as he becomes obsessed with getting revenge for his partner's death. He is voiced by Shintarō Asanuma in Japanese and by Jonathan Brooks in English.

=== Season 2 ===
==== Mika Shimotsuki ====
Mika Shimotsuki (Note: 霜月 美佳, Shimotsuki Mika) first appeared in season 1's episode 6 as a high school student attending Oso Academy as schoolmates with Rikako Oryo. Two of her friends become Rikako's victims during the story arc. She became a MWPSB inspector in the same team as Akane at the end of season 1. She has a tendency to question and at times argue with Akane when it comes to matters of treating enforcers with professional courtesy (where unlike the latter, she looks down on them) and implementing the proper police procedures. The only person she admires and trusts is Yayoi, who saved her during the events of the first season. In regards to the first Sinners of the system film, Shiotani picked Nobuchika Ginoza and Mika Shimotsuki as the main characters due to their similarities to the protagonists from the first television series, Shinya Kogami and Akane Tsunemori, respectively. Voice actress Ayane Sakura believed Shimotsuki was now more fitting for the role of a heroine thanks to her experience in the second television series where she was the youngest main character. Cherami Leigh voices her in English. In regards to her role in Psycho-Pass 3, Sakura further noted that Shimotsuki would do anything for justice's sake even if it she gets hate as a result.

==== Sakuya Togane ====
Sakuya Togane (Note: 東金 朔夜, Tōgane Sakuya) is a new Enforcer working with Akane and Mika in season 2. He used to be a therapist and becomes some sort of confidant to Akane. His family is very wealthy. He is also noted to have the highest Crime Coefficient ever measured by Kasei, who advises Akane to be wary of him. Togane also seems obsessed with Akane and usually uses his dominator to check on her hue and collects several data regularly about her, which Mika finds upon investigating his room. It was later on revealed, that he was artificially created by Misako Togane whom at that time was the founder of the Togane Foundation that is engage in cutting edge human organ transplant research. She treats him like a son where she encourages him to be evil, he derives pleasure by killing animals when he was little. As an enforcer, he has darkening the hues of five Inspectors that he once served. He hold a certain affection towards Misako, his mother, where it is suggested that he has a form of Oedipus complex that he is unwilling to be separated from her, where he killed her in a fit of insecurity. He was later on confined to a juvenile correction institution, while his mother literally becomes part of the Sybil System. Misako who is now in the body of Kasei allowed him to serve as an enforcer despite his twisted desire to join. He is voiced by Keiji Fujiwara in Japanese and by Christopher R. Sabat in English.

==== Sho Hinakawa ====
Sho Hinakawa (Note: 雛河 翔, Hinakawa Shō) is a new Enforcer in season 2. He usually acts shy and introverted. He used to be a hologram designer and is thus especially skilled in analyzing digital information on the field. In season 3, he and Shion are the only ones who remain in Division 1 after a major overhaul of its members. He tasks himself with protecting Unit One and remains connected with Akane. He is voiced by Takahiro Sakurai in Japanese and by Z. Charles Bolton in English.

==== Joji Saiga ====
Joji Saiga (Note: 雑賀 譲二, Saiga Jōji) is a former university professor whose expertise is clinical psychology. Knowledgeable, sharp and observant, he used to conduct lessons for MWPSB's investigators but some of their Crime Coefficient rose as a result. In season 1, he lived in the countryside away from the Sibyl System. However, after assisting Kogami with his plans to kill Shogo, his Crime Coefficient rises and was apprehended by the Public Safety Bureau. In season 2, he was shown to be receiving rehabilitation at an isolation facility and eventually recruited as an analyst in the Public Safety Bureau, where he specializes in interrogations. He is voiced by Kazuhiro Yamaji in the Japanese version, and Michael Federico in the English dub.

==== Risa Aoyanagi ====
Risa Aoyanagi (Note: 青柳 璃彩, Aoyanagi Risa) is an inspector of Division 2 and a friend of Nobuchika who assists Akane's team in season 2. She is killed by her own Division 2 enforcer who is commanded by Division 3 inspectors to enforce anybody with a high crime coefficient. She is voiced by Masumi Asano in the Japanese version, and Colleen Clinkenbeard in the English version.

==== Teppei Sugo ====
Teppei Sugo (Note: 須郷 徹平, Sugo Teppei) is a new Enforcer in season 2. Originally an Enforcer for Unit Two under Risa, he is instructed to enforce anybody with a high crime coefficient during a hostage situation in a mental care facility, leading to him killing his own inspector. He is then transferred to Unit One, where he faces tension with Nobuchika, Risa's close friend. Teppei continues to help the team, especially in an encounter at a drone factory he worked at prior to his crime coefficient rising. Psycho-Pass: Sinners of the System further reveals that Teppei was a drone pilot for the military before being involved in an incident wherein he first encountered Risa and Tomomi and where his crime coefficient began rising. He is voiced by Hiroki Tōchi in the Japanese version, and Mike McFarland in the English version.

==== Mizue Shisui ====
Mizue Shisui (Note: 酒々井 水絵, Shisui Mizue) is an inspector of Division 2. During season 2 premiere, she is forced to kill her Enforcer by Kirito Kamui and then kidnapped by him, who promises to "free" her. However, Kamui took one of her eyes which suggested that he used it to secretly access Public Safety Bureau's computers by retina scan. Despite the loss of her eye, she becomes incredibly loyal to Kamui for keeping her hue clear. She is voiced by Marina Inoue in Japanese and by Monica Rial in English.

=== Season 3 ===
==== Arata Shindo ====
Arata Shindo (Note: 慎導灼, Shindo Arata) is a new Inspector of the MWPSB in Unit One introduced in season 3. He is a specialized class A mentalist and is later discovered to be Criminally Asymptomatic. He also has the ability to cross mental boundaries due to being highly empathic, making him skilled in tracking his targets. He became an inspector for a purpose he has in common with his friend and fellow inspector Kei Mikhail Ignatov. Arata is voiced by Yūki Kaji, and by Dallas Reid in the English dub. Kaji enjoyed the character's relationship with Ignatov due to his closer tone when interacting as well as whenever Shindo met characters from previous series. Special attention was given to Shindo's characterization as he depending on how he was written he could come across as an unlikable character based on how he leads conversations while also noting he was still caring. Ubukata wanted the two main characters to be written solely by Fukami.

==== Kei Mikhail Ignatov ====
Kei Mikhail Ignatov (Note: 炯・ミハイル・イグナトフ) is a new Inspector of the MWPSB in Unit One introduced in season 3. He is a second-generation Russian immigrant, naturalized Japanese. He is married to another former veteran named Maiko Maya Stronskaya who was blinded in an explosion. Kei is a former military veteran who excels in fighting and shooting and has a strong sense of justice. He is Arata Shindo's childhood friend and decides to become an inspector for some purpose they both have in common. Kei is voiced by Yūichi Nakamura, and by Eduardo Vildasol in the English dub. Nakamura enjoyed the dynamic between Ignatov and Shindo to the point he wished the two were brothers. He further noted that in contrast to other Inspectors, Ignatov rarely uses the Dominator, seeking more peaceful ways of dealing with criminals.

==== Mao Kisaragi ====
Mao Kisaragi (Note: 如月真緒, Kisaragi Mao) is a new Enforcer of the MWPSB in Unit One introduced in season 3. Near the end of the season, she confesses to the Bureau that she was partially involved in the car crash orchestrated by Bifrost that took Kei and Shindo's predecessor Inspectors out of commission. She is voiced by Kaori Nazuka, and by Morgan Garrett in the English dub.

==== Kazumichi Irie ====
Kazumichi Irie (Note: 入江一途, Irie Kazumichi) is a new Enforcer of the MWPSB in Unit One introduced in season 3. Raised in the Myogadani, a slum out of the Sibyl System's signal range whose residents had clouded hues, he joined the MWPSB to protect the area, using his knowledge and connections within to assist in investigations. He is voiced by Junichi Suwabe, and by Joe Cucinotti in the English dub.

==== Tenma Todoroki ====
Tenma Todoroki (Note: 廿六木天馬, Todoroki Tenma) is a new Enforcer of the MWPSB in Unit One introduced in season 3. Born into the elite and powerful Todoroki family, he was supposedly gene-edited to have a perfect Psycho-Pass. However, upon discovering that he was a latent criminal, his mother killed herself and he was exiled from the family. He is voiced by Akio Ōtsuka, and by Larry Brantley in the English dub.

== Other characters ==
=== Allies ===
A group of people aligned with the Public Safety Bureau, but are not members of it.

==== Frederica Hanashiro ====
Frederica Hanashiro (Note: 花城 フレデリ, Hanashiro Furederika) is an Assistant Officer within the Suppressing Action Department of the Foreign Affairs Operations Department, a branch overseeing international crimes such as smuggling and terrorism. The branch includes its own sets of investigators and advisors that Frederica heads, including former Unit One inspectors Nobuchika Ginoza, Teppei Sugo, and Shinya Kogami. First appearing in Psycho-Pass: Sinners of the System to recruit Teppei and Shinya, she is known to do the dirty work of the Ministry of Foreign Affairs. She appears regularly in Season 3, coordinating with Chief Mika Shimotsuki of the Public Safety Bureau as the two organizations conduct independent but highly connected investigations. She is voiced by Takako Honda, and by Erin Kelly Noble in the English dub.

==== Maiko Maya Stronskaya ====
Maiko Maya Stronskaya (Note: 舞子・マイヤ・ストロンスカヤ, Maiko Maiya Stronskaya) is married to Kei Mikhail Ignatov. She has a military background and is skilled with firearms. She lost her vision following an explosion. She is voiced by Risa Shimizu. while Naya Moreno voices her in English.

==== Karina Komiya ====
Karina Komiya (Note: 小宮香利奈, Komiya Karina) is the Governor of Japan in Season 3. Originally an idol, she decides to pursue the position of Governor after the Sibyl System recommended it. While her scheme in using artificial intelligence as a ghostwriter for her political campaign is exposed during the gubernatorial elections, she is elected regardless. She is in regular contact with Arata Shindo. She is voiced by Yōko Hikasa. While Alexis Tipton voices her in the English dub.

=== Criminals ===
A group of people connected to, or influenced by, Shogo Makishima who reject and oppose the Sybil System.

==== Shogo Makishima ====
Shōgo Makishima (Note: 槙島 聖護, Makishima Shōgo) is a humanist on the dark side who is obsessed with cruelty, savagery, and all the worst aspects of human nature. A born evangelist, he possesses both uncommon charisma and a true gift for narrative. It is shown that Makishima may be the mastermind behind the many cases the Public Safety Bureau are investigating, including the one that led Kogami to become demoted from Inspector to Enforcer. Despite his murderous intent, his Crime Coefficient levels have never reached dangerous levels, rendering him safe from the Dominator. He himself claims this is because his own mind and body does not consider him killing people and committing crimes to be "wrong", but rather considers it to be completely "normal", which means his Psycho-Pass does not detect any abnormal or illegal behavior to report to the Sibyl System. These traits result in the Sibyl sparing his life to join them but Makishima escapes from them, still wishing to destroy them. He is killed by Kogami after a failed attempt of bioterrorism. He is voiced by Takahiro Sakurai in Japanese while Alex Organ voices him in English.

==== Choe Gu-sung ====
Choe Gu-sung (Note: チェ・グソン, Che Guson) is Shogo Makishima's friend and right-hand man. He is a Korean immigrant who moved to Japan with his family as a kid. He despises the society created by the Sibyl System and wishes to remove it. While initially acting as a messenger for him, Gu-sung takes a bigger role in the series when he records the murder of a woman at the hands of a man immune to the Sybil by using an advanced helmet. Using this video to cause several riots in the city, Gu-sung and Makishima take advantage of the Bureau force being busy with stopping the riots to uncover the truth behind the Sibyl System. In infiltrating, Gu-sung, along with Kagari, are both killed by Joshu Kasei. In the novelization, Gu-sung is a former member of the Korean People's Army and following his country's defeat he spent a decade wandering until meeting Makishima. He is voiced by Yasunori Masutani in Japanese while David Wald voices him in English.

==== Rikako Oryo ====
Rikako Ōryō (Note: 王陵 璃華子, Ōryō Rikako) is a student at Oso Academy. Despite her gentle personality, Oryo is a serial killer who uses the corpses of her victims to create art monuments for her sick father. All of her crimes are orchestrated by Shogo Makishima who appears at her school as one of her teachers. However, Shinya Kogami discovers she is the culprit behind several murders and tries to arrest her. Although Oryo manages to escape from Kogami with Choe Gu-sung's help, she is murdered by another of Makishima's underling, Toyohisa Senguji, as her superior no longer sees her useful. She is voiced by Maaya Sakamoto in Japanese while Brina Palencia voices her in English. Her bones were later crafted into smoking pipes by Toyohisa Senguji as one of his many hunting trophies.

==== Toyohisa Senguji ====
Toyohisa Sengūji (Note: 泉宮寺 豊久, Sengūji Toyohisa) is a man who managed to expand his lifespan by becoming a cyborg. He is one of Shogo Makishima's assistants, first appearing to kill his underling Rikako Oryo. A sociopath, Senguji is obsessed with sport hunting, with Makishima motivating him to hunt down Enforcer Shinya Kogami after he discovers Oryo's identity. He takes on Kogami in an area designed as a hunting ground, but is killed himself. He is voiced by Katsumi Chō in Japanese while Charlie Campbell voices him in English.

==== Kirito Kamui ====
Kirito Kamui (Note: 鹿矛囲 桐斗, Kamui Kirito) is a mysterious character who first appears in Season 2 of Psycho-Pass. He seems to know about Akane Tsunemori. It is suggested that he is also like Makishima Shogo, who is cold, cunning, manipulative and cruel, and it is also suggested that, just like Makishima, his hue has a low crime coefficient count which also makes him immune from an enforcer's "Dominator." However, unlike Makishima, who uses various criminals as a means of uncovering humanity's repressed desires as a way of spreading chaos and mass hysteria to bring down the Sibyl System, Kamui exploits the flaws within the Sibyl System and uses ordinary people who were either at their limits of their repressed aggression or disenchanted with the world to serve as his pawns to spread chaos and mayhem to bring down the Sibyl System. He is voiced by Ryōhei Kimura in Japanese and by Clifford Chapin in English.

=== Bifrost ===
Bifrost is a secret criminal organization which utilizes and manipulates a highly sophisticated AI secretly housed beneath the NONA Tower. The AI has powerful abilities to predict outcomes based on statistical data and probability which individual members of the organization use to gamble on the outcome of real world events. It is revealed in First Inspector that Bifrost is a top secret debugging unit from the early stages of Sibyl System's implementation. However, investors in the project used its position and changed it into a unit that exploits Sibyl's vulnerabilities for profit.

==== Shizuka Homura ====
Shizuka Homura (Note: 法斑静火, Homura Shizuka) is a secondary character in the third season. He is a novice Congressman in the holo game, Roundrobin. His true wish is the destruction of Bifrost for which he can gave his life. He accomplished his goal by winning all roundrobin bids and defeating Shirogane and Saionji. Homura appoints Sibyl as the new Congressman which proceeds to dissolve Bifrost. He is appointed as Public Security Chief and he orders release of Akane Tsunemori. He is last seen with Akane meeting Arata and Kei where Tsunemori divulges that she will now reveal the truth to them. He is voiced by Mamoru Miyano in Japanese, and by Aaron Roberts in the English dub.

==== Haruki Shirogane ====
Haruki Shirogane (Note: 代銀遙熙, Shirogane Haruki) is a Congressman in the holo game of Roundrobin. He is a veteran member of Bifrost and is well acquainted with rules of the game. He is disintegrated by Bifrost after losing against Homura during the events of First Inspector. He is voiced by Hiroshi Naka in Japanese, and by R. Bruce Elliott in the English dub.

==== Kyoko Saionji ====
Kyoko Saionji (Note: 裁園寺莢子, Saionji Kyoko) is a Congressman in the holo game of Roundrobin. She is a veteran member of Bifrost. She and Shirogane are responsible for purging Homura's adoptive father, Kyoichiro. She is also a benefactor of Heaven's Leap. She is disintegrated by Bifrost after her illegal interference to the Roundrobin is revealed by Shirogane. She is voiced by Atsuko Tanaka in Japanese and by Elizabeth Maxwell in English.

==== Koichi Azusawa ====
Koichi Azusawa (Note: 梓澤廣一, Azusawa Koichi) is the main antagonist of the third season. He is a former Inspector in Bifrost. He is also the owner of a café. He was once an Inspector in the Ministry of Welfare until he was defeated by Atsushi Shindo. However, he uses his loss to awaken his talent as a criminal. Azusawa arranges for the accidental murder of Asahi "Rick" Fellows which triggers the events of Psycho-Pass 3. He was also the mastermind behind the attack on the Public Security Bureau. His true desire was to become a part of Sibyl, which he calls attaining godhood, but due to not being criminally asymptomatic he was not chosen. This enrages him; he tells Sibyl that they will regret not choosing him before getting in a brawl with Arata, who knocks him out. He was arrested and is currently in Jail. He is voiced by Kenyuu Horiuchi in Japanese, and by Ian Sinclair in the English dub.

==== Chiyo Obata ====
Chiyo Obata (Note: 小畑 千代, Obata Chiyo) is a minor antagonist of Psycho-Pass 3. She is a Bifrost Inspector. She works together with Koichi Azusawa. Chiyo is a computer expert and an excellent hacker. She was last seen being arrested by the Ministry of Foreign Affairs during the events of First Inspector. She is voiced by Sayari Yahagi in Japanese, and by Hollis Beck in the English dub.

==== Haruki Enomiya ====
Haruki Enomiya (Note: 榎宮春木, Enomiya Haruki) is a minor antagonist in Psycho-Pass 3. He is an ex-Pro Athlete and latent criminal who owns an HvH (Human versus Human) underground combat ring. He acts as a broker in an abandoned zone of the city and also serves as a Bifrost Inspector with the rank of Second Inspector. He was killed by Koichi Azusawa. He is voiced by Tomoko Miyadera in Japanese, and by Kiba Walker in the English dub.

==== Torri S. Aschenbach ====
Torri S. Aschenbach (Note: トーリ・S・アッシェンバーハ, Torri S Asshebaaha) was a minor antagonist in Psycho-Pass 3. He was the son of Congressmen Kyoko Saionji. He was the main religious representative of Heaven's Leap and a member of Anti-Special-Zone Faction as well as being an Inspector in Bifrost with the rank of Third Inspector. He was killed by Maiko Stronskaya. He is voiced by Kaito Ishikawa in Japanese, and by Landon McDonald in the English dub.

==== Atsushi Shindo ====
Atsushi Shindo (Note: 慎導篤志, Shindo Atsushi) was the father of Arata Shindo. He joined Bifrost as an Inspector to save Arata from Sibyl System, after discovering he was criminally asymptomatic. He also killed Kei's brother Akira Ignatov and committed suicide. He is voiced by Takayuki Sugo in Japanese and by Bruce DuBose in English.

== Reception ==
Publications for anime have given positive response to the series' characters. Rebecca Silverman criticized the characters for often monologuing about their philosophies. The development of Shinya Kogami and Akane Tsunemori has also been well received by Rebecca Silverman from Anime News Network due to the impact both have in the series' climax. Chris Beveridge of The Fandom Post praised the film the actions of both Kogami and Tsunemori. For the 2015 film, Kotaku reviewer Richard Eisenbeis praised the settings to which Kogami and Tsunemori have to adapt, in contrast to the Sibyl System explored in the first television series. The reviewer also commended the film's climax, in which supporting characters from the television series appear and are more likable compared to their earlier incarnations. Alexandria Hill of Otaku USA praised the first interactions between Kogami and Tsunemori for being action-filled because they contrast with the heavy use of dialogue at the beginning of the film.

The supporting cast received similar praise by DVDTalk but still felt some were underwhelming with Shion being the least explored character. Despite being concerned regarding the "weak characterization" in the series, The Fandom Post's Thomas Zoth praised the relationships of the cast such as Nobuchika Ginoza's and Tomomi Masaoka's. Shogo Makishima also received positive response with praise owing to his orchestration of several crimes but criticism to his immunity to the system by Kotaku's Richard Einsbeis. DVDTalk highly enjoyed his character as "When I said Makashima is unique I didn't mean just for the show, but in general. He's a villain that doesn't seem like too much of a threat at the start, but as the series continues, he's the problem for literally everything. He gets shit done. There is no posturing with him and a legitimate sense of danger when his character shows up, not only that, but he's cultured and sophisticated. More shows need villains like this one." His fights against Kogami were also the subject of praise. The development of the Sinners of the System leads was acclaimed for how Production I.G handles their minds and evolve across the story.

Shindo and Ignatov's roles were praised by TheCinemaHolic due to how they fit within the supporting characters and brief elements from the past lives imply further depths such as the latter being a victim of xenophobia. Kila from Sequential Planet noted that the usage of new protagonists was a risky move for the franchise due to the popularity of Kogami and Tsunemori. Nevertheless, she believed that both Shindo and Ignatov were likable characters, enjoying the former the most for how his cheerful personality stood in high contrast to the dark narrative. Due to the focus the duo is given, the reviewer believed Shindo and Ignatov managed to be Kogami and Tsunemori's successors. Shindo was also praised by Anime News Network because his mentalist skill adds a new element to investigation and gives the series an air of mystery. Although Anime News Network was disappointed by the lack of closure for the returning cast, the focus given on Shindo and Ignatov earned positive responses for the build up they are given in terms or not whether they will betray one another. As Ignatov is the primary subject of this, the website claims he has a bigger character arc than his best friend.

Tsunemori and Kogami won the "Noitamina" award in an official poll involving characters that appeared in a Noitamina television series. In the 2013 Newtype anime awards, Tsunemori was voted the third-best female character. Kogami's role in Sinners of the System gave him the top place in a 2019 Newtype poll. In a 2019 Anime! Anime! poll, Kogami was tied with Whitebeard from One Piece for eighth place as the character fans wanted to have as their boss. In another poll by Newtype, Kogami was voted the 24th-most-popular male anime character of the 2010s.

Critics also focused on the cast' voices. UK Anime Network liked Kana Hanazawa for the stronger tone she provided for her character in comparison to the previous works during the first movie. Takahiro Sakurai was also praised by Rebecca Silverman from Anime News Network for his role as Makishima as he makes a "creepily soothing tone." Anime UK News and Rice Digital called Robert McCollum and Kate Oxley the best English actors in the dub.
