= Psycho-Pass: Mandatory Happiness =

2015 video game

- European cover art
- Developer: 5pb.
- Publishers: JP: 5pb.; WW: NIS America
- Directors: Makoto Asada; Rumie Higashinaka
- Producer: Makoto Asada
- Artist: Kyouji Asano
- Writers: Makoto Fukami; Ren Kanan; Jinroku Myougaya; Hikaru Sakurai; Gan Sunaaku
- Composer: Takeshi Abo
- Series: Psycho-Pass
- Platforms: Xbox One, PlayStation 4, PlayStation Vita, Windows
- Release: May 28, 2015: Xbox One; JP: May 28, 2015 PlayStation 4, PS Vita; JP: March 24, 2016; NA: September 13, 2016; EU: September 16, 2016; AU: September 30, 2016 Windows April 24, 2017
- Genre: Visual novel
- Mode: Single-player

Psycho-Pass: Mandatory Happiness (Japanese: サイコパス 選択なき幸福, Hepburn: Saiko Pasu Sentaku Naki Kōfuku) is a visual novel video game developed by 5pb. It was originally released for the Xbox One in 2015 in Japan, with PlayStation Vita and PlayStation 4 versions following in 2016 in Japan, North America and the PAL region. A Windows version was released on April 24, 2017. The game is based on the 2012 anime series Psycho-Pass.

== Plot ==
The story's backdrop is a dystopian future Tokyo where people can be preemptively imprisoned for their propensity to commit crimes, based on a technology-enabled personality scan called a Psycho-Pass. The game takes place in a timeline within the anime's first 12 episodes. The player controls one of two characters: inspector Nadeshiko Kugatachi, who is missing memories of her past, or enforcer Takuma Tsurugi, whose lover is missing. The antagonist is a rogue artificial intelligence named Alpha, whose objective of bringing happiness to individuals through unsanctioned means brings him into conflict with the government. Alpha attempts to provide happiness through chemical control, mass manipulation, and eventually by reducing the human population. The three characters do not appear in the anime series; the story runs parallel to the TV show's.

== Release ==
The game was originally released for the Xbox One on May 28, 2015, in Japan; PlayStation 4 and PlayStation Vita versions followed on March 24, 2016. NIS America released the latter two versions on September 13, 2016, in North America, on September 16, 2016, in Europe, and on September 30, 2016 in Australia. A Windows version of the game was released on Steam on April 24, 2017.

== Reception ==
Reception

Aggregate score
| Aggregator | Score |
|---|---|
| Metacritic | (PS4) 72/100 (PC) 70/100 (Vita) 64/100 |

Review scores
| Publication | Score |
|---|---|
| 4Players | 55% |
| Destructoid | (Vita) 7.5/10 |
| Famitsu | (XOne) 32/40 |
| GamesMaster | (PS4) 45% |
| Hardcore Gamer | (Vita) 4/5 |
| HobbyConsolas | (PS4) 65% |
| Jeuxvideo.com | 10/20 |
| MeriStation | 8/10 |
| PlayStation Official Magazine – UK | (Vita) 4/10 |
| Push Square | (PS4) 7/10 |
| RPGFan | (PS4) 80% (Vita) 79% |
| Anime News Network | C+ |

The game received "mixed or average reviews" on all platforms according to the review aggregation website Metacritic. In Japan, Famitsu gave the Xbox One version a score of two eights, one seven and one nine for a total of 32 out of 40.

Much of the focus within reviews involved positive feedback in regards to the narrative. Destructoid writer Brittany Vincent gave praise to the characterization, but criticized the production values. Thais Valdivia from HobbyConsolas praised the story but felt that more could've been included in the gameplay. Marcus Estrada from Hardcore Gamer praised the game's storyline and characters, stating that they were "utterly compelling", although he criticized the game's lack of text resizing for the Vita port.
