= Tatsuma =

- Gender: Male

Origin
- Origin: Japanese
- Meaning: Different meanings depending on the kanji used

Tatsuma (written: 立真, 竜馬 or 達磨) is a masculine Japanese given name. Notable people with the name include:

- Tatsuma Ejiri (江尻 立真; born 1975), Japanese manga artist
- Tatsuma Ito (伊藤 竜馬; born 1988), Japanese tennis player
- Tatsuma Yoshida (吉田 達磨; born 1974), Japanese footballer

== Fictional characters ==
- Tatsuma Sakamoto (坂本 辰馬), a character in the manga series Gintama
