= Revoroot =

Japanese animation studio

Revoroot Inc.
- Native name: 株式会社レヴォルト
- Romanized name: Kabushiki-gaisha Revorutō
- Company type: Kabushiki gaisha
- Industry: Japanese animation
- Founded: April 1, 2016; 10 years ago
- Headquarters: Suginami, Tokyo, Japan
- Key people: Kazuki Enami (CEO); Kiyotaka Suzuki (Board member)
- Parent: Twin Engine (2016-2021)
- Website: revoroot.co.jp

Revoroot Inc. (Japanese: 株式会社レヴォルト, Hepburn: Kabushiki-gaisha Revoruto) is a Japanese animation studio based in Tokyo. Revoroot was founded as a subsidiary of Twin Engine, but as of 2021, it operates as an independent studio. The studio was originally headquartered in Nishitokyo, but relocated to Suginami in 2022. Following the move, part of Revoroot's staff stayed in Nishitokyo to operate as a separate studio, Crew-Cell, which would continue to work as a subsidiary of Twin Engine. Kazuki Emani, the CEO of Revoroot, is also the CEO of Crew-Cell.

== Works ==
=== Television series ===
Title	Director(s)	First run start date	First run end date	Eps	Note(s)	Ref(s)
FLCL Alternative	Katsuyuki Motohiro; Yutaka Uemura	September 8, 2018	October 13, 2018	6	Third season of FLCL. Co-produced with Production I.G and NUT.	
Babylon	Kiyotaka Suzuki	October 6, 2019	January 27, 2020	12	Based on a novel series written by Mado Nozaki.	
I've Been Killing Slimes for 300 Years and Maxed Out My Level	Nobukage Kimura	April 10, 2021	June 26, 2021	12	Based on a light novel written by Kisetsu Morita.	
My Isekai Life	Keisuke Kojima	July 4, 2022	September 12, 2022	12	Based on a light novel written by Shinkoshoto.	
