= Kiyotaka Suzuki =

Japanese anime director

- 鈴木清崇
- Born: 1979 (age 46–47); Bunkyō, Tokyo, Japan
- Occupation: Anime director
- Years active: 2008–present
- Known for: Psycho-Pass 2; Infini-T Force; Babylon

Kiyotaka Suzuki (Japanese: 鈴木清崇, Hepburn: Suzuki Kiyotaka; born 1979) is a Japanese anime director. He starting working in 2008 and directed his first series in 2014 with Psycho-Pass 2. He later directed Infini-T Force and Babylon. He also is currently a board member at anime studios Revoroot and Crew-Cell.

== Biography ==
Kiyotaka Suzuki was born in Bunkyō, Tokyo, in 1979. In elementary school, Suzuki was a fan of novel writers Jules Berne and Ranpo Edogawa. Once in middle school, Suzuki became more interested in crafting things. During this time, he also developed a passion for anime. So, he decided to become a director in order to do both at once.

In 2020, Suzuki was nominated for best director at the Crunchyroll Anime Awards.

== Works ==
=== TV series ===
- Yozakura Quartet: Hana no Uta (2013) (assistant director)
- Psycho-Pass 2 (2014) (director)
- Infini-T Force (2017) (director)
- FLCL Alternative (2018) (assistant director)
- Babylon (2019) (director)
- My Isekai Life (2022) (assistant director)

=== Films ===
- Evangelion: 3.0 You Can (Not) Redo (2012) (chief unit director)
