= My Isekai Life =

Japanese light novel series and franchise

- My Isekai Life: I Gained a Second Character Class and Became the Strongest Sage in the World!
- First light novel volume cover

転生賢者の異世界ライフ 〜第二の職業を得て、世界最強になりました〜 (Tensei Kenja no Isekai Raifu ~Daini no Shokugyō o Ete, Sekai Saikyō ni Narimashita~)
- Genre: Adventure, isekai
- Novel series
- Written by: Shinkoshoto
- Published by: Shōsetsuka ni Narō
- Original run: October 2017 – February 2020
- Light novel
- Written by: Shinkoshoto
- Illustrated by: Huuka Kazabana
- Published by: SB Creative
- Imprint: GA Novel
- Original run: May 12, 2018 – present
- Volumes: 19
- Manga
- Written by: Shinkoshoto
- Illustrated by: Ponjea
- Published by: Square Enix
- English publisher: NA: Square Enix
- Magazine: Manga Up!
- Original run: July 29, 2018 – present
- Volumes: 34
- Anime television series
- Directed by: Keisuke Kojima
- Written by: Naohiro Fukushima
- Music by: Gin (Busted Rose)
- Studio: Revoroot
- Licensed by: Sentai Filmworks: SA/SEA: Medialink
- Original network: AT-X, Tokyo MX, BS NTV, BS Fuji
- English network: SEA: Animax Asia
- Original run: July 4, 2022 – September 12, 2022
- Episodes: 12
- icon

My Isekai Life: I Gained a Second Character Class and Became the Strongest Sage in the World! (転生賢者の異世界ライフ 〜第二の職業を得て、世界最強になりました〜, Tensei Kenja no Isekai Raifu ~Daini no Shokugyō o Ete, Sekai Saikyō ni Narimashita~), or simply My Isekai Life, is a Japanese light novel series written by Shinkoshoto and illustrated by Huuka Kazabana. It began serialization online in October 2017 on the user-generated novel publishing website Shōsetsuka ni Narō. It was later acquired by SB Creative, who has released the series since May 2018 under their GA Novel label.

A manga adaptation with art by Ponjea has been serialized online since July 2018 via Square Enix's online manga magazine Manga Up!. The manga is licensed in North America by Square Enix. An anime television series adaptation by Revoroot aired from July to September 2022.

== Plot ==
Yūji Sano, an overworked corporate employee, is unexpectedly summoned to a game-like fantasy world after unknowingly accepting the transfer from his computer. Believing the experience to be a dream, Yūji initially seeks only to return to his former life, but he soon learns he possesses the Monster Tamer class, considered the weakest profession. By befriending numerous slimes, he gains access to vast amounts of magical knowledge, allowing him to acquire a second class as a Sage and rapidly become one of the most powerful figures in the world. Despite his overwhelming abilities, Yūji attempts to live quietly, shaped by the trauma of his previous life, but growing threats and looming catastrophes force him to confront the responsibilities that come with his power.

== Characters ==
Yuji (ユージ, Yūji)
Voiced by: Chiaki Kobayashi (Japanese); Scott Gibbs (English)
Falling asleep as a salaryman but waking up in the world of a game he was playing as a novice Tamer. Despite his confusion he tamed a slime and immediately discovered the disused hut of a deceased sorcerer. He found that as the slimes read the sorcerers' book collection he instantly gained all the skills and knowledge from the books and within minutes gained the title of Sage.
Dryad (ドライアド, Doraiado)
Voiced by: Azumi Waki (Japanese); Kira Vincent-Davis (English)
Proudwolf (プラウドウルフ, Puraudo Urufu)
Voiced by: Wataru Takagi (Japanese); John Gremillion (English)
Sura (スラ)
Voiced by: Hikaru Tono (Japanese); Christina Kelly (English)
Surapacchi (スラパッチ)
Voiced by: Mai Kanno (Japanese); Rob Mungle (English)
Mayusura (マユスラ)
Voiced by: Haruna Mikawa (Japanese); Blake Shepard (English)
Surahappa (スラハッパ)
Voiced by: Erisa Kuon (Japanese); Taylor Fono (English)
Higesura (ヒゲスラ)
Voiced by: Nichika Ōmori (Japanese); Mark X. Laskowski (English)
Pekesura (ペケスラ)
Voiced by: Miharu Hanai (Japanese); James Marler (English)

== Media ==
=== Light novel ===
The series is written by Shinkoshoto and illustrated by Huuka Kazabana. Originally serialized online on Shōsetsuka ni Narō in October 2017, SB Creative published the first novel in print under their GA Novel label on May 15, 2018. As of March 2026, nineteen volumes have been released.

No.	Japanese release date	Japanese ISBN
1	May 15, 2018	978-4-7973-9695-9
2	October 15, 2018	978-4-7973-9817-5
3	May 15, 2019	978-4-8156-0245-1
4	November 14, 2019	978-4-8156-0422-6
5	March 13, 2020	978-4-8156-0542-1
6	August 6, 2020	978-4-8156-0731-9
7	November 12, 2020	978-4-8156-0833-0
8	March 12, 2021	978-4-8156-0969-6
9	June 12, 2021	978-4-8156-1139-2
10	November 12, 2021	978-4-8156-1258-0
11	July 14, 2022	978-4-8156-1659-5
12	September 14, 2022	978-4-8156-1660-1
13	March 15, 2023	978-4-8156-2008-0
14	August 10, 2023	978-4-8156-2118-6
15	December 15, 2023	978-4-8156-2119-3
16	September 14, 2024	978-4-8156-2548-1
17	March 15, 2025	978-4-8156-2908-3
18	September 13, 2025	978-4-8156-3435-3
19	March 14, 2026	978-4-8156-3436-0

=== Manga ===
A manga adaptation, illustrated by Ponjea, started serialization in Square Enix's Manga Up! website on July 29, 2018. The first tankōbon volume was released on September 13, 2018. As of November 2026, thirty-four volumes have been released.

On March 13, 2021, Square Enix announced that they will begin publish the manga in English in December 2021. They later released the first volume in January 2022.

No.	Original release date	Original ISBN	English release date	English ISBN
1	September 13, 2018	978-4-7575-5841-0	January 4, 2022	978-1-64609-097-6
2	December 13, 2018	978-4-7575-5940-0	July 12, 2022	978-1-64609-098-3
3	April 12, 2019	978-4-7575-6040-6	October 11, 2022	978-1-64609-099-0
4	June 12, 2019	978-4-7575-6158-8	December 13, 2022	978-1-64609-100-3
5	September 12, 2019	978-4-7575-6295-0	February 14, 2023	978-1-64609-101-0
6	December 12, 2019	978-4-7575-6422-0	April 11, 2023	978-1-64609-102-7
7	March 12, 2020	978-4-7575-6559-3	June 13, 2023	978-1-64609-103-4
8	May 12, 2020	978-4-7575-6639-2	August 8, 2023	978-1-64609-114-0
9	August 7, 2020	978-4-7575-6788-7	October 10, 2023	978-1-64609-116-4
10	November 7, 2020	978-4-7575-6924-9	December 12, 2023	978-1-64609-125-6
11	February 5, 2021	978-4-7575-7066-5	February 13, 2024	978-1-64609-148-5
12	May 7, 2021	978-4-7575-7234-8	April 9, 2024	978-1-64609-166-9
13	August 11, 2021	978-4-7575-7415-1	June 11, 2024	978-1-64609-167-6
14	November 11, 2021	978-4-7575-7573-8	August 13, 2024	978-1-64609-215-4
15	February 12, 2022	978-4-7575-7742-8	October 8, 2024	978-1-64609-216-1
16	May 12, 2022	978-4-7575-7926-2	December 10, 2024	978-1-64609-217-8
17	August 10, 2022	978-4-7575-8082-4	February 11, 2025	978-1-64609-338-0
18	November 11, 2022	978-4-7575-8261-3	April 8, 2025	978-1-64609-339-7
19	February 10, 2023	978-4-7575-8411-2	June 10, 2025	978-1-64609-340-3
20	May 11, 2023	978-4-7575-8577-5	August 12, 2025	978-1-64609-341-0
21	August 10, 2023	978-4-7575-8731-1	October 14, 2025	978-1-64609-342-7
22	November 10, 2023	978-4-7575-8904-9	December 9, 2025	978-1-64609-343-4
23	February 9, 2024	978-4-7575-9056-4	February 10, 2026	978-1-64609-366-3
24	May 11, 2024	978-4-7575-9194-3	April 14, 2026	978-1-64609-433-2
25	August 9, 2024	978-4-7575-9367-1	June 9, 2026	978-1-64609-434-9
26	November 12, 2024	978-4-7575-9518-7	August 11, 2026	978-1-64609-435-6
27	February 12, 2025	978-4-7575-9681-8	February 9, 2027	979-8-89910-017-8
28	May 12, 2025	978-4-7575-9855-3	—	—
29	August 8, 2025	978-4-301-00017-4	—	—
30	November 12, 2025	978-4-301-00173-7	—	—
31	February 12, 2026	978-4-301-00330-4	—	—
32	May 12, 2026	978-4-301-00532-2	—	—
33	August 10, 2026	978-4-301-00714-2	—	—
34	November 12, 2026	978-4-301-00890-3	—	—

=== Anime ===
An anime television series adaptation by Revoroot was announced during the "GA Fes 2021" event livestream on January 31, 2021. It is directed by Keisuke Kojima, with Kojima and Norihito Saitama serving as character designers. Kiyotaka Suzuki is serving as the assistant director, with scripts written by Naohiro Fukushima, and music composed by Gin from Busted Rose. The series aired from July 4 to September 12, 2022, on AT-X, Tokyo MX, BS NTV, and BS Fuji, with the first two episodes airing back-to-back. The opening theme song is "Mujikaku no Tensai" by Non Stop Rabbit, while the ending theme song is "Gohan da yo! Dadadadan!!" by Hikaru Tono, Mai Kanno, Haruna Mikawa, Erisa Kuon, Nichika Ōmori, and Miharu Hanai under the unit name Surachanzu△. Sentai Filmworks has licensed the series. Medialink also licensed the series in Asia-Pacific. At their Otakon panel in July 2022, Sentai Filmworks announced that the series will receive an English dub in August 2022.

The first promotional video was released on January 4, 2022. According to the director, Keisuke Kojima, all key frames in the video were illustrated with Clip Studio Ex.

==== Episodes ====
No.	Title	Directed by	Written by	Storyboarded by	Original release date
1	"I Wanted to Protect the Town"; Transliteration: "Machi o Mamoritaku Natta" (Japanese: 街を守りたくなった)	Yasunori Gotō	Naohiro Fukushima	Keisuke Kojima	July 4, 2022
Yuji is an adventurer in the village of Phastan. Due to his classification as a Monster Tamer, he is assumed by most to be weak and is often overlooked, but in secret, he is a very powerful sorcerer known as a Sage. Ten thousand monsters attack the village and Yuji helps the other adventurers mount a defense. Tracking the monsters with his multiple tamed slimes, as well as his wolf monster Proudwolf and forest spirit Dryad, Yuji is able to protect the village with a barrier and destroy the monsters with Dragon's fire by feeding a dragon bone to one of his slimes. His other slimes capture the man responsible, a member of a cult called Blue Moon of Salvation. The cultist however commits suicide after being captured; leaving behind a magical lantern he used to control the monsters. Yuji passes out from using too much magic. Yuji briefly remembers a past life as a Salaryman in Japan and so he sneaks away from the celebrating adventurers before they can thank or reward him or draw too much attention to him.
2	"Trying Out a Party"; Transliteration: "Pātī o Kundemita" (Japanese: パーティーを組んでみた)	Yasunori Gotō	Naohiro Fukushima	Keisuke Kojima	July 4, 2022
Yuji travels to Kilia's adventurer guild and is invited to form a party due to his tracking abilities with the knife wielder Rodis, archer Tina and spear wielder Lisa. They accept a job to track a rock dragon. As they sleep at night, Yuji dreams of falling asleep as a salaryman but waking up in the world of a game he was playing as a novice Tamer. Despite his confusion, he tamed several slimes and immediately discovered the disused hut of a deceased sorcerer. He found as the slimes read the sorcerers' book collection, he instantly gained all the skills and knowledge from the books and within minutes gained the title of Sage. Awakening he finds Rodis is missing. Tracking him they follow Rodis to a bandit camp and learn Rodis is a bandit who lures and kidnaps adventurers to sell them into slavery. Yuji freezes the bandits camp in solid ice and the girls realize one of the bandits is Gelios, an infamous bandit and cult member with a substantial price on his head. Yuji realize the Blue Moon cult was behind the attack at Phastan and appears concerned about a cryptic claim Gelios made about a future calamity.
3	"I Meant Too Strong"; Transliteration: "Tsuyosugiru tte Imi Datta" (Japanese: 強すぎるって意味だった)	Michita Shiraishi	Yutaka Yasunaga	Kiyotaka Suzuki	July 11, 2022
Yuji continues tracking the rock dragon with Tina and Lisa. The moon and sky suddenly turn blue, as foretold by the cultist's prophecy, and a blue dragon appears, forcing them to shelter in nearby Delight Canyon. The rock dragon emerges and blocks Yuji, Tina and Lisa from going further. With the slimes Yuji uses a powerful fire spell to burn the Earth Dragon so only its skeleton remains. With the dragon skull and the bounty on Gelios the guild pays them 14 million gold. Yuji is drawn into a meeting with Guild Chief Rayard and Grand Cathedral representative Father Steyl. Steyl reveals in church legend the dragon appeared and destroyed a continent before being defeated by a divine emissary who rivalled the power of God. 30 years ago the church performed a summoning ceremony to cause the emissary to appear one week before the dragon, but the emissary never came. Even without the emissary Rayard orders the guild to attack the dragon at first light. In private, Steyl reveals a holy vision directed him to gift Yuji a church relic, the Dagger of Kethis, which can focus magic power. At night, as his slimes report the blue dragon continues to grow larger, Yuji fears many adventurers will die and comes to a decision.
4	"Truly Unusual Situations"; Transliteration: "Iroiro Ijō Jitai Datta" (Japanese: いろいろ異常事態だった)	Kiyotaka Suzuki, Atsushi Kashiwa	Yutaka Yasunaga	Keisuke Kojima	July 18, 2022
Yuji and his slimes spring an attack on the dragon. Utilizing protective barrier magic Yuji is able to avoid the dragon's attacks, and with his fire magic concentrated in the Dagger of Kethis, stabs it in the neck so the explosion kills the dragon instantly. With the dragon mysteriously defeated Steyl leaves but Rayard suspects Yuji. Having drawn too much attention again Yuji leaves for the town of Ricaardo which, according to Tina and Lisa, is a completely ordinary place. Dryad informs Yuji dead dragons contain something called Dragon Grace, which has sprouted mushrooms around the corpse with which she can make potions, red to increase Sage skills, and Blue to restore depleted magic. As the potions brew Yuji remembers first meeting Dryad dying after an unidentified person drained her forests magic with a crystal, so he saved her with a magic transfusion then destroyed the crystal, restoring her forest. Yuji encounters a village shrouded in fog called the Village of Messias. The villagers are suspicious of his presence but allow him to leave when he assures them he was just lost. As he leaves the villagers contact an unknown person to reassure him their plan to retrieve the Dragon Grace is unaffected. Yuji makes it to where Ricaardo should be but finds the landscape covered in unnatural snow.
5	"That Cold Looked Troubling"; Transliteration: "Samukute Taihen Mitai Datta" (Japanese: 寒くて大変みたいだった)	Yoshiyuki Kumeda, Ryūta Imaizumi	Naohiro Fukushima	Kenichi Ishikura	July 25, 2022
Entering Ricaardo Yuuji learns the snow is unusual and the villagers were unprepared for it, since their firewood has already been used up. Disappointed he can't try Ricaardo's famous cuisine without cooking fires, Yuuji figures out how to use his slimes to dry out freshly chopped trees to make perfect firewood. The town chef, grateful for the wood, cooks Yuuji one of his finest dishes in gratitude. Seeing the rest of Ricaardo is still short on wood, Yuuji joins the local foresters and shocks them by procuring enough wood for the entire town to last several weeks. Yuuji receives yet another meal, but the chef reveals it is not his best food as the fields where the town grows its famous herbs is plagued by monsters eating them. Proudwolf and the slimes help locate the boar-type monsters and defeat them. They also find a crystal orb which turns out to be Dragon Grace refined into a cursed crystal is absorbing all the magic in the area and causing the snow. Following other crystals set in a circular pattern, Yuuji locates the pattern's center and, despite Dryad's unhappy permission, destroys the forest around the center, revealing an old house with a trapdoor leading underground.
6	"Infiltrating an Ominous Village"; Transliteration: "Ayashii Mura ni Mogurikonda" (Japanese: 怪しい村に潜り込んだ)	Yōki Nekusu	Naohiro Fukushima	Kiyotaka Suzuki, Yūki Ōshima, Atsushi Kashiwa	August 1, 2022
Yuuji discovers an enormous machine using stolen magic absorbed by the crystal orbs to produce Dragon Grace. The slimes explore the cave and emerge in Messias, proving all the villagers are Blue Moon cultists. Their leader Javier is furious Yuuji's destroying the forest also damaged the machine. Working in secret the slimes swallow all the cults sacred texts and treasure. Yuuji decides to kill the cultists, until Javier mentions a weapon called Cleansing Flame, which will destroy the area if the cultists die, including Ricaardo village. Yuuji decides to let them live, but all the cultists abruptly commit suicide to activate the Flame. Working quickly Yuuji retrieves the slimes and, combining every magical barrier he knows, creates a new spell called Total Isolation Barrier prevents the Flame spreading beyond Messias. The snow starts to melt and the Ricaardo villagers celebrate Yuuji as the Firewood Hero and reward him with Chef's true finest meal, since he now has access to his herb field again. The texts are booby-trapped with a spell turn them blank, except for a list of the cults targets, which includes Yuuji. Elsewhere, two assassins with an identical list choose Yuuji as their next target.
7	"Assassins in Pursuit"; Transliteration: "Ansatsusha ni Nerawareteita" (Japanese: 暗殺者に狙われていた)	Yasunori Gotō	Yutaka Yasunaga	Ikuo Geso	August 8, 2022
On the advice of the villagers Yuuji heads for Boginia, a town famous for outfitting tamed monsters with armour. The assassins follow him to determine if he is a threat to the cult. Aware of their presence, Yuuji considers killing them but worries this will draw the cult's attention, but instead he decides to find a way to have his name removed from the assassins list. Reaching Boginia, Yuuji puts on a convincing act he is a penniless idiotic drunk. He also attempts to pretend to be an amateur monster tamer while batting several Bull monsters, but his warrior instincts are too strong and he accidentally reveals his skill with a sword. The assassins are confused but eventually conclude he is a complete novice with some natural sword skills, and leave to report to their employer who reveals to them about Messias destruction. The slimes overhear the assassins discuss their next target, Father Steyl. Unwilling to let Father Steyl get killed, Yuuji has his slime set off an ice explosion, freezing the assassins solid. With the assassins dealt with Yuuji is able to act normally again and asks Boinia's best armorer, Geigel, for armour for his slimes. Geigel agrees but claims there is a problem with a monster at a nearby volcano.
8	"We Got Some Monster Armor"; Transliteration: "Mamono Bōgu o Tsukutte Moratta" (Japanese: 魔物防具を作ってもらった)	Yan Sheng Huang	Naohiro Fukushima	Ikuo Geso	August 15, 2022
Geigel reveals to craft suitable armour he must have a jewel from a Blue Lesser Fire Dragon. The volcano is a nest for Lesser Fire dragons, and Blue are the rarest. Yuuji learns from the guild the only way to defeat one would be to fatally cool their bodies with water from the closest available river, which is home to a giant monster piranha. On the way Yuuji tames several red fire slimes who help him capture the piranha for a large bounty. He also defeats multiple dragons using water summoned by magic and collects their jewels. His slimes eventually locate a blue dragon which is defeated by ice magic. Returning to the guild Yuuji collects multiple quest rewards for killing 202 dragons, 2 blue dragons and the piranha. With an abundance of jewels Geigel crafts armour for the slimes and Proudwolf vastly increases their speed, though he warns Yuuji his most powerful spells could damage or even destroy the armor if overused. The only way to craft stronger armor is with a jewel from a true Flame Dragon, which lives in the lava of the volcano and rarely comes to the surface. The remaining Lesser dragons suddenly go mad from the same cultist spell which made 10,000 monsters attack Phastan, and the Flame Dragon itself emerges from the volcano.
9	"We Fought a Fire Dragon"; Transliteration: "Faia Doragon to Tatakatta" (Japanese: ファイアドラゴンと戦った)	Kiyotaka Suzuki	Yutaka Yasunaga	Kenichi Ishikura	August 22, 2022
The slimes spot two men heading for the fire dragon carrying barrels. They mention they came from a town called Ordarion. They avoid Yuuji's trap, proving they are experienced, but they are captured regardless. To avoid interrogation they commit suicide, proving they were with the cult. Dryad confirms the barrels contain cursed water, a weaker version of the cursed crystals, probably designed to enrage the Flame Dragon. It begins to rain, which enrages the Fire Dragon who never emerges during the rainy season in case the rain extinguishes its fire. Terrified, the villagers evacuate Boginia while Yuuji stays behind to confront it. The dragon is so hot its presence dries up a river. Yuuji uses ice magic to slow the Dragon down while using a barrier to dam the river, releasing the collected water once it rises high enough and completely submerges the giant Dragon. This only enrages it and it attempts to destroy Boginia. Yuuji is forced to use his strongest ice spell and freezes the Dragon solid, killing it. The slimes collect the dropped Flame jewel and also discover an object near the volcano. Yuuji gives the Flame jewel to Geigel who promises to craft armour never seen before. Yuuji discovers the object is an artificial rain maker, meaning the cult made it rain to enrage the dragon on purpose.
10	"Didn't Seem Like a Good Time for That"; Transliteration: "Sore Dokoro ja Nai Mitai Datta" (Japanese: それどころじゃないみたいだった)	Yoshiyuki Kumeda, Ryūta Imaizumi	Naohiro Fukushima	Kiyotaka Suzuki	August 29, 2022
Yuuji reaches Ordarion and identifies cult members who refer to someone called Walter. Father Steyl explains in his youth he founded the Blue Moon Church to honor dead adventurers. Walter joined the church and quickly became Steyl's right hand man. Soon after Walter and his loyal followers murdered all other church members except Steyl and established the cult with the goal of cleansing the world of all sin and corruption, meaning all of humanity. By divine revelation Steyl is convinced Yuuji is the divine emissary, and it is his destiny to defeat Walter, though he does not tell Yuuji the whole truth about his revelation. Walter receives a divine revelation the emissary will be victorious if Steyl is killed. Steyl leaves Ordarion so Yuuji has the slimes follow him to a cave where Walter resides with the rest of the cultists. Believing Yuuji is the emissary Steyl plans to let Walter kill him so Yuuji will be victorious. Steyl is suddenly betrayed by his own servant Johann who has been in contact with Walter, who has known about Yuuji the entire time. Yuuji arrives just in time to save Steyl.
11	"The Revelation Came True"; Transliteration: "Otsuge no Tōri ni Natta" (Japanese: お告げの通りになった)	Keisuke Kojima	Yutaka Yasunaga	Keisuke Kojima	September 5, 2022
Walter places himself inside a machine infuses his body with Dragon Grace, mutating him into a dragon. Yuuji outfits Proud Wolf and a slime with their armour, allowing them to destroy part of Walter's body. Walter absorbs Grace from his monsters, healing himself and growing larger. Coordinating his slimes, Yuuji traps Walter in nets and destroys his body. Before dying Walter prays the Revelation will begin. Walter's machine activates upon Walter's death, absorbing his corpse, his monsters, and even Johann, to summon a one-eyed man who calls himself Sage. Steyl is forced to reveal the rest of the Revelation to Yuuji, the death of a teacher shall cause the Emissary to be victorious. He had assumed it would be his death made Yuuji victorious, but it is clear it actually meant Walter's death would resurrect the original emissary that died centuries ago fighting the original blue dragon. Sage, using magic similar to Yuuji's, attempts to kill him and destroys the cave to escape into the sky. Despite a ferocious fight Yuuji and his slimes are unable to defeat Sage. Sage begins the Salvation of the world by activating multiple rain maker machines powered by Grace, creating rainclouds to rain Grace over all the land, infecting monsters across the world.
12	"My Isekai Life"; Transliteration: "Tensei Kenja no Isekai Raifu" (Japanese: 転生賢者の異世界ライフ)	Yasunori Gotō, Kiyotaka Suzuki	Naohiro Fukushima	Keisuke Kojima, Kiyotaka Suzuki	September 12, 2022
The monsters begin attacking nearby villages. Sage claims he will provide Salvation by destroying the world. The slimes reveal in every village he has visited adventurers and citizens have risen up in defense of their homes, inspired by Yuuji. Steyl receives a new revelation; when the sun and moon unite divine judgement will be bestowed. Sage demands to know why Yuuji insists on defending the world, and Yuuji only responds he happens to like the world as it is. Using his most powerful spell called Divine Judgement, Yuuji concentrates the spell into the Dagger of Kethis, causing a light so bright it temporarily eclipses the sun, just as in Steyl's revelation. Sage is stabbed with the dagger and destroyed. Despite every village celebrating, Yuuji once again chooses to quietly disappear. Elsewhere, the remaining cult members dismiss Walter's death as trivial as they are working on a new machine, The Purifier, which will destroy the entire continent and with it their final enemy, the Black Dragon of Judgement. Eavesdropping via his slime Yuuji is exasperated the cult still hasn't given up. After collecting another bounty in a new village Yuuji learns from local guild leader Meggia defeating dragons and Sage has made him famous across the continent and his desire to live in obscurity is now impossible.

=== Video game ===
An online MMORPG video game, developed by CTW Inc., was released on July 4, 2022.

== See also ==
- The Strongest Sage with the Weakest Crest, another light novel series by the same author and illustrator
- The World's Strongest Rearguard, another light novel series by the same illustrator
