= Babylon (novel series) =

Japanese novel series

- First novel cover, featuring Ai Magase

バビロン (Babiron)
- Genre: Suspense thriller
- Novel series
- Written by: Mado Nozaki
- Illustrated by: Zain
- Published by: Kodansha
- Imprint: Kodansha Taiga
- Original run: October 20, 2015 – November 22, 2017
- Volumes: 3
- Manga
- Illustrated by: Nobuhide Takishita
- Published by: Kodansha
- Imprint: Afternoon KC
- Magazine: Comic Days
- Original run: February 25, 2019 – October 7, 2019
- Volumes: 2
- Anime television series
- Directed by: Kiyotaka Suzuki
- Produced by: Koji Yamamoto
- Written by: Minaka Sakamoto
- Music by: Yutaka Yamada
- Studio: Revoroot
- Licensed by: Amazon Prime Video (streaming); NA: Sentai Filmworks (home video)
- Original network: Tokyo MX, BS11, AT-X
- Original run: October 6, 2019 – January 27, 2020
- Episodes: 12
- icon

Babylon (Japanese: バビロン, Hepburn: Babiron) is a Japanese suspense thriller novel series written by Mado Nozaki and illustrated by Zain. A manga adaptation by Nobuhide Takishita was published in 2019, and an anime television series adaptation by Revoroot aired from October 6, 2019, to January 27, 2020, which was streamed worldwide on Amazon Prime Video.

== Plot ==
Zen Seizaki is a public prosecutor in the newly created Shiniki district west of Tokyo which is a testing ground for a new nation. He investigates a pharmaceutical company promoting a defective drug following reports of falsified test results by university labs. During the investigation, Shin Inaba, an anesthetist, is found dead and a bloodstained document is discovered, which includes hair and skin, covered with letter "F". Seizaki's investigation leads to a plot involving the mayoral elections and manipulation of the Shiniki population to embrace a new legislation legalizing suicide. Seizaki discovers that a sinister woman named Ai Magase appears to be behind the push to legalize suicide and is causing the deaths of all of those who oppose her.

== Characters ==
Zen Seizaki (正崎善, Seizaki Zen)
Voiced by: Yuichi Nakamura (Japanese); David Matranga (English)
Public prosecutor at Tokyo District Public Prosecutors Office who leads an investigation into the Shiniki mayoral elections and possible manipulation of the population. When the investigation expands overseas, Zen joins the FBI. In his personal life, he is a married man and the loving devoted father of a little boy named Asuma.
Ai Magase (曲世愛, Magase Ai)
Voiced by: Satsuki Yukino (Japanese); Maggie Flecknoe (English)
Main antagonist of the series. She is a master of disguise and appears as a number of different women. She uses the unique qualities of her voice to make people to commit suicide, convincing them that ending their lives is "good".
Shinobu Kujiin (九字院偲, Kujiin Shinobu)
Voiced by: Takahiro Sakurai (Japanese); Scott Gibbs (English)
Assistant Police Inspector.
Atsuhiko Fumio (文緒厚彦, Fumio Atsuhiko)
Voiced by: Kenshō Ono (Japanese); Heath Morrow (English)
Young officer in the Tokyo District Public Prosecutors Office who unexpectedly commits suicide.
Hiasa Sekuro (瀬黒陽麻, Sekuro Hiasa)
Voiced by: M.A.O (Japanese); Natalie Rial (English)
She is an Assistant Officer who is assigned to Seizaki's team, and is also the niece of the Kasumigaseki Vice Minister of Justice, Yoshifumi Sekuro. She is kidnapped by Magase, who then cuts her limbs with an axe and kills her by decapitating her.
Yasutaka Morinaga (守永泰孝, Morinaga Yasutaka)
Voiced by: Kenyu Horiuchi (Japanese); Rob Mungle (English)
Head of the Tokyo District Public Prosecutors Office.
Ariyoshi Hanta (半田有吉, Hanta Ariyoshi)
Voiced by: Kazuyuki Okitsu (Japanese); Greg Cote (English)
A newspaper journalist. A close friend of Zen Seizaki from their college days.
Ryūichirō Nomaru (野丸龍一郎, Nomaru Ryūichirō)
Voiced by: Katsuhisa Hōki (Japanese); Josh Morrison (English)
He is the Former Secretary General of the Liberal Justice Party and a middle-aged mayoral candidate.
Kaika Itsuki (齋開化, Itsuki Kaika)
Voiced by: Ryōtarō Okiayu (Japanese); Adam Gibbs (English)
30 year old successful mayoral candidate who pushes for law reform to legalize suicide.
Hitomi Seizaki (正崎人美, Seizaki Hitomi)
Voiced by: Mai Nakahara (Japanese); Olivia Swasey (English)
Zen's wife and Asuma's mother.
Asuma Seizaki (正崎アスマ, Seizaki Asuma)
Voiced by: Natsumi Fujiwara (Japanese); Meg McDonald (English)
Zen and Hitomi's young son and only child.

== Media ==
=== Novel ===
Mado Nozaki published the first novel in the series, with illustrations by Zain, under Kodansha's Kodansha Taiga label on October 20, 2015. Three volumes have been published as of November 22, 2017.

No.	Title	Japanese release date	Japanese ISBN
1	Woman; On'na (女)	October 20, 2015	978-4-06-294002-3
2	Death; Shi (死)	July 20, 2016	978-4-06-294031-3
3	End; Tsui (終)	November 22, 2017	978-4-06-294072-6

=== Manga ===
A manga adaptation with art by Nobuhide Takishita began serialization on Kodansha's Comic Days website on February 25, 2019 and ended on October 7, 2019. It was compiled into two volumes, both released on October 9, 2019.

=== Anime ===
An anime television series adaptation was announced to be in production in March 2018. The series is animated by Revoroot and produced by Twin Engine. Kiyotaka Suzuki directs the series, while Keisuke Goto provides the series' character designs, and Yutaka Yamada composes the series' music. The series aired from October 6, 2019, to January 27, 2020, on Tokyo MX, BS11 and AT-X, with Amazon Video streaming the first three episodes worldwide. The third story arc was delayed and resumed on December 30, 2019. The first story arc opening theme song is "Live and let die" by Q-MHz featuring uloco. The second story arc opening theme song is "Inochi food soul" by Q-MHz featuring Mikako Komatsu. The third story arc opening theme song is "The next new world that no one knows (blood stained ver.)" by Q-MHz featuring Namirin.

On February 11, 2021, it was announced Sentai Filmworks has licensed the anime for a North American home video release and it was released on Blu-ray and digital on May 11, 2021.

Number	Title	Original release date
Story arc 1: One Drop of Poison (一滴の毒, Itteki no Doku)
1	"Suspicion"; Transliteration: "Giwaku" (Japanese: 疑惑)	October 6, 2019
Public Prosecutor Zen Seizaki, investigates the "Agras" case alleging that the Japan Supiri pharmaceutical company is promoting a defective drug. There are allegations that four universities have provided falsified test results. During the investigation, he finds a sealed document in a file which includes blood stains, hair, skin, fingernails and the letter "F" is written repeatedly on the paper. The material is traced to the anesthetist Shin Inaba, but when they go to his apartment, they find him dead from an apparent anesthetic overdose. Investigation reveals that he has had two regular visitors, an unknown woman and Tomokazu Ano, an associate of the Secretary General of the Liberal Justice Party, Ryuichiro Nomaru. Nomaru is a favored candidate in the mayoral elections for the newly created independent city of Shiniki, the testing ground for a new nation. Seizaki asks his old friend and journalist Ariyoshi Hanta to investigate Nomaru. Seizaki and his assistant, Atsuhiko Fumio, follow Ano and a young woman to a club where they meet Shinzo Chijima, head of the Tokyo Construction Contractors Federation. When they leave, Fumio follows the woman to her apartment. Seizaki then receives a suicide message from Fumio, and Seizaki races to the apartment building. When he arrives, he finds Fumio hanging on the balcony, dead.
2	"Target"; Transliteration: "Hyōteki" (Japanese: 標的)	October 6, 2019
Seizaki does not believe that Fumio committed suicide, and later questions a woman, Emiko Hiramatsu, who was seen with Ano visiting Inaba. She reveals very little, except that she voluntarily has sex with men as arranged by Ano. She agrees to sign a statement on condition that Seizaki tells her about himself, and she interrogates him about his life at length. However, when he leaves her with officer Okuda, she dupes him and leaves the building. His further investigations reveal that Nomaru and his rival Kaika Itsuki appear to be connected. When Seizaki prepares to present his report on the investigation to his superiors, he is shocked to find that Nomaru is present.
3	"Revolution"; Transliteration: "Kakumei" (Japanese: 革命)	October 6, 2019
Nomaru explains to Seizaki that Shiniki is actually an experiment for testing new laws and regulations without the restrictions of the existing system, and that his opponent Kaika Itsuki will become its first mayor. However police chief Yasutaka Morinaga and Nomaru ask Seizaki to continue his investigation into the deaths of Inaba and Fumio. Itsuki and his advisors go missing and Morinaga suspects that the woman Ai Magase who was brought in by Itsuki is behind the deaths and disappearances. She apparently has the ability to completely change her appearance, and was also the woman Seizaki interviewed as Emiko Hiramatsu. Suddenly, a news bulletin announces that up to 60 people are standing dangerously on the rooftop of a multistorey building. Seizaki receives information from Ben Minton that Inaba was researching a new drug called Nyux, which acts like a painless suicide pill. Itsuki then appears on TV, announcing that the new tool for humankind, equivalent to the invention of fire, is death. At the end of his broadcast all the people on the rooftop leap to their deaths. Seizaki sees Ai Magase in the crowd below, and suspects that the "F" written on Inaba's document stands for "Female".
Story arc 2: The Chosen Death (選ばれた死, Erabareta shi)
4	"Chase"; Transliteration: "Tsuiseki" (Japanese: 追跡)	October 28, 2019
The rail system is shut down after numerous suicides and the authorities assign Morinaga to coordinate the search for Kaika Itsuki. The Kasumigaseki Vice Minister of Justice, Yoshifumi Sekuro, explains that Itsuki may not have actually broken the law. Later, Assistant Officer Hiasa Sekuro is assigned to Seizaki's team, who is also the niece of Yoshifumi Sekuro. Itsuki releases another video announcing a new suicide law, which will become the focus of the upcoming election, virtually splitting the candidates into pro or anti Itsuki factions. Kasumigaseki Police Director of Unit 1, Torao, also joins the investigation team. Days before the election, Seizaki's team have still not located Itsuki or Ai Magase, nor can they find evidence that Itsuki abetted the suicides. However, Seizaki eventually obtains some data on Ai Magase.
5	"Confession"; Transliteration: "Kokuhaku" (Japanese: 告白)	November 4, 2019
Seizaki explains to officer Sekuro that Ai Magase was being seen by her uncle, Doctor Kurauzu Sakabe. They visit the doctor who says that Ai was adopted and when he conducted psychological evaluations of fellow male students, they all reported the experience of being raped by her merely through her physical presence. Her effect was so strong that even Sakabe was affected by it and eventually resigned his position. Seizaki and Sekuro take time out and practice kendo when Itsuki releases another public statement, proposing a debate on the suicide law at the NHC television studio. Seizaki immediately commits the investigation team to finding evidence Itsuki abetted suicide. Later, Magase calls from Investigator Tsusui's mobile phone saying that she wants to bring happiness to the world, then Tsusui runs onto the road where he is hit by a truck and dies with a smile on his face.
6	"Strategy"; Transliteration: "Sakusen" (Japanese: 作戦)	November 11, 2019
On the day of the public debate, no evidence has been found that Itsuki abetted any suicides and Seizaki disbands the investigation team. Although Ryuichiro Nomaru is confident of winning the debate and the election, Seizaki tells his former team that he plans to kidnap Itsuki, making them all accomplices and they decide to join him. The televised debate commences with those speaking against the suicide law speaking first. Itsuki then argues his case, however, Nomaru introduces a young boy whose father wants to commit suicide and supports him as a candidate in the election, swaying public opinion against the law. However, Itsuki unmasks the boy and reveals that it is his son, Taiyo.
7	"The Most Evil"; Transliteration: "Saiaku" (Japanese: 最悪)	November 18, 2019
Itsuki tells his son and all those watching the televised debate, that he wants to die so that his ailing son can have his healthy heart and survive, swaying public opinion to support the law. After the debate, Seizaki proceeds with his kidnap plan, separating Itsuki from his wife and son. However he loses contact with the teams. When he goes to investigate, he finds Assistant Police Inspector Shinobu Kujiin wounded in the car park. Kujiin explains that he shot himself to cause enough pain to live to tell Seizaki that Itsuki's wife was probably Magase who caused him to want to die of ecstasy after she whispered softly in his ear. Defying all efforts by Seizaki to save him, Kujiin kills himself with his own revolver and Seizaki realizes that this is her technique to make people suicide. Seizaki receives a call from Sekuro who has seen Magase, and against his advice, she attempts to stop Magase herself. Seizaki races to her location, but finds his officers dead and Sekuro missing. Later he receives a call from Magase on Sekuro's phone in which she calmly explains why she is evil as she apparently dismembers Sekuro while she is still alive.
Story arc 3: Twisted World (選曲がる世界, Magaru Sekai)
8	"Hope"; Transliteration: "Kibō" (Japanese: 希望)	December 30, 2019
The votes for and against the suicide law are equal which enables the law to be enacted in Shiniki. Meanwhile, only Sekuro's death is determined to be a murder, all the other deaths are considered voluntary suicides. Seizaki is tormented by Sekuro's death and receives a package with two eggs, one of which contains a human eye. Ariyoshi Hanta tells Seizaki he unable to write anything about the mass suicide as it will not be published. Shiniki begins enacting the suicide law and the euthanasia drug Nyux becomes widely available. The trend for planned suicide begins to spread to the cities of Halifax in Canada and Grenoble in France. Seizaki receives a visit from FBI agent Samuel Hardy who wants to question him about the mass suicide at the NHC center. Meanwhile in the USA, President Alexander W. Wood tells of his sickly youth and his determination to conquer his illness. He became a master online game player and helped a female player who eventually married him. In the USA, the government becomes more concerned about the international acceptance of the suicide law after Hartford is the first USA city to adopt the law. Using his usual carefully considered approach, President Wood ponders the law's implications for his country.
9	"Chain"; Transliteration: "Rensa" (Japanese: 連鎖)	January 6, 2020
USA President Wood discusses the voluntary suicide law with Mayor Flores of Hartford, which is known as a major insurance center in the United States. Flores claims that he is passing the law in the city because he believes that he is reflecting America's "frontier spirit", however the President advises caution and he pressures Flores to delay. Wood speaks to the president of France about Grenoble adopting the law, but the French president considers it of little importance. Later, the FBI chief advises the President that Ai Magase is suspected to be behind the mass suicides and Seizaki arrives to provide additional background information on her. Seizaki travels with FBI agent Samuel Hardy to Hartford where he tracks down a phone call made to the mayor just before he visited dying patients in hospital. While Seizaki listens to a recording of the conversation, he suddenly hears Magase's voice speaking directly to him.
10	"Decision"; Transliteration: "Ketsui" (Japanese: 決意)	January 13, 2020
Evidence points to Magase making the call to Mayor Flores from Germany. President Wood discusses the suicide law with the German Chancellor who surprisingly does not oppose the legislation. Wood seeks counsel with the head of the church who cannot provide the concrete answer he seeks. Meanwhile, Seizaki and Hardy find the young girl Flores spoke to at the hospital on a bridge preparing to commit suicide, to be with her dead mother. They try to stop her, but fail. Undecided about which course to take because of a lack of information, President Wood's wife encourages him to follow his instinct. Wood discusses his options with Seizaki who admits that he is seeking revenge for those close to him who have died because of Magase. Wood appoints Seizaki as a special investigator, to be issued with a gun and to return to Japan to be with his family. Meanwhile, Itsuki announces a "suicide summit" with the leaders of the cities which have adopted the suicide law. Wood announces his own summit of seven world leaders to discuss the same issue.
11	"The Curtain Rises"; Transliteration: "Kaimaku" (Japanese: 開幕)	January 20, 2020
In a prologue, an excerpt in the Book of Revelation from the Bible describes the Whore of Babylon. President Wood addresses the summit of seven world leaders, and convinces Canada, Italy, Germany, Britain, France and the European Union to first decide between what is good and what is evil. Before they come to a conclusion, Itsuki makes a public announcement that a girl is preparing to commit suicide by jumping from the top of Shiniki City Hall, but is unsure of whether she wishes to die or not. Itsuki invites Wood to speak to her.
12	"The End"; Transliteration: "Owari" (Japanese: 終)	January 27, 2020
President Wood considers the implications of talking to the girl who is considering jumping from the top of Shiniki City Hall which will be publicly broadcast. She calls herself Kanae Kuyo, but Wood and Seizaki suspect she may be Ai Magase. Seizaki offers to interpret, but agent Hardy insists on taking the risky role himself and Wood agrees. Wood tells Kuyo that he does not yet have an answer for her, but convinces her to wait until he does, to everyone's relief. Later, Wood realizes that continuity is good, and therefore suicide is wrong, but when the tries to communicate with Kuyo, he hears Magase's voice. When Wood leaves the conference room, Seizaki realizes that something is wrong and then finds all the interpreters dead. The security staff are ordered to cut electronic communication and find the president. Seizaki finds Wood on the edge of the roof, prepared to commit suicide, even though he admits that it is not a "good" thing to do. They both realize that Seizaki must kill him to prevent his suicide. Seizaki reluctantly shoots him, and then Ai Magase appears on the roof as Kanae Kuyo. When Seizaki points his gun at her, she asks him the difference between good and evil. He struggles with his response and a shot is heard. Some time later, a woman resembling Ai Magase alights from a bus at a small village and meets Seizaki's son.
