= Psycho-Pass 2 =

Season of television series

- Key visual of the series
- Genre: Crime; Cyberpunk
- Created by: Gen Urobuchi
- Anime television series
- Directed by: Naoyoshi Shiotani; Kiyotaka Suzuki (Note: Series Director (シリーズディレクター))
- Produced by: Akitoshi Mori; Masaya Saito; Fumi Morihiro; Kenji Tobori; George Wada
- Written by: Tow Ubukata (Note: Series Composition and Screenplay Cooperation (シリーズ構成・脚本協力)); Jun Kumagai (Note: Screenplay (脚本))
- Music by: Yugo Kanno
- Studio: Tatsunoko Production
- Licensed by: AUS: Madman Entertainment; NA: Crunchyroll; UK: Anime Limited
- Original network: Fuji TV (Noitamina)
- Original run: October 10, 2014 – December 19, 2014
- Episodes: 11
- Manga
- Written by: Saru Hashino
- Published by: Mag Garden
- Magazine: Monthly Comic Garden
- Original run: November 5, 2014 – February 5, 2017
- Volumes: 5
- Preceded by
- Psycho-Pass (2012–2013)
- Sequel
- Psycho-Pass 3 (2019)
- icon

Psycho-Pass 2 is a Japanese anime television series by Tatsunoko Production that serves as a direct sequel and de facto second season to the 2012 anime television series Psycho-Pass. It was directed by Naoyoshi Shiotani and Kiyotaka Suzuki, and supervised by Katsuyuki Motohiro and Gen Urobuchi. The series is written by Tow Ubukata, featuring scripts by Ubukata and Jun Kumagai. Character designs are by Akira Amano and adapted by Kyoji Asano. The series takes place in an authoritarian future, where omnipresent public sensors continuously scan the Psycho-Pass of every citizen in range. The sensors measure mental state, personality, and the probability that the citizen will commit crimes, alerting authorities when someone exceeds accepted norms. The story once again follows the Public Safety Bureau's Criminal Investigation Division, led by Inspector Akane Tsunemori, as they are caught up in another mysterious case. Psycho-Pass 2 aired on Fuji TV's Noitamina programming block between October and December 2014.

== Plot ==
In Psycho-Pass 2, Tsunemori leads a restored Unit One that includes rookie inspector Mika Shimotsuki; Ginoza, who has been demoted to Enforcer; Kunizuka and two new Enforcers named Sakuya Togane and Sho Hinakawa. The team faces a new threat in the form of Kirito Kamui, another criminal mastermind who is invisible to the Sibyl System. He, like Makishima, intends to bring down the Sibyl System but, unlike Makishima, wants to do so by exploiting its flaws instead of wreaking havoc, and making it judge itself as a collective consciousness. Due to having parts from different people, he is skilled in avoiding all forms of detection as the Sibyl System is unable to recognize him. He is also skilled in making medication that helps his supporters keep their Crime Coefficients low. As a result, few believe that he actually exists. At the climax of this season, Akane Tsunemori leads Kirito Kamui to the core of the Sibyl System. In the end, Sibyl decides to recognize Kirito Kamui (鹿矛囲 桐斗), a collective mind of seven people.

== Production ==
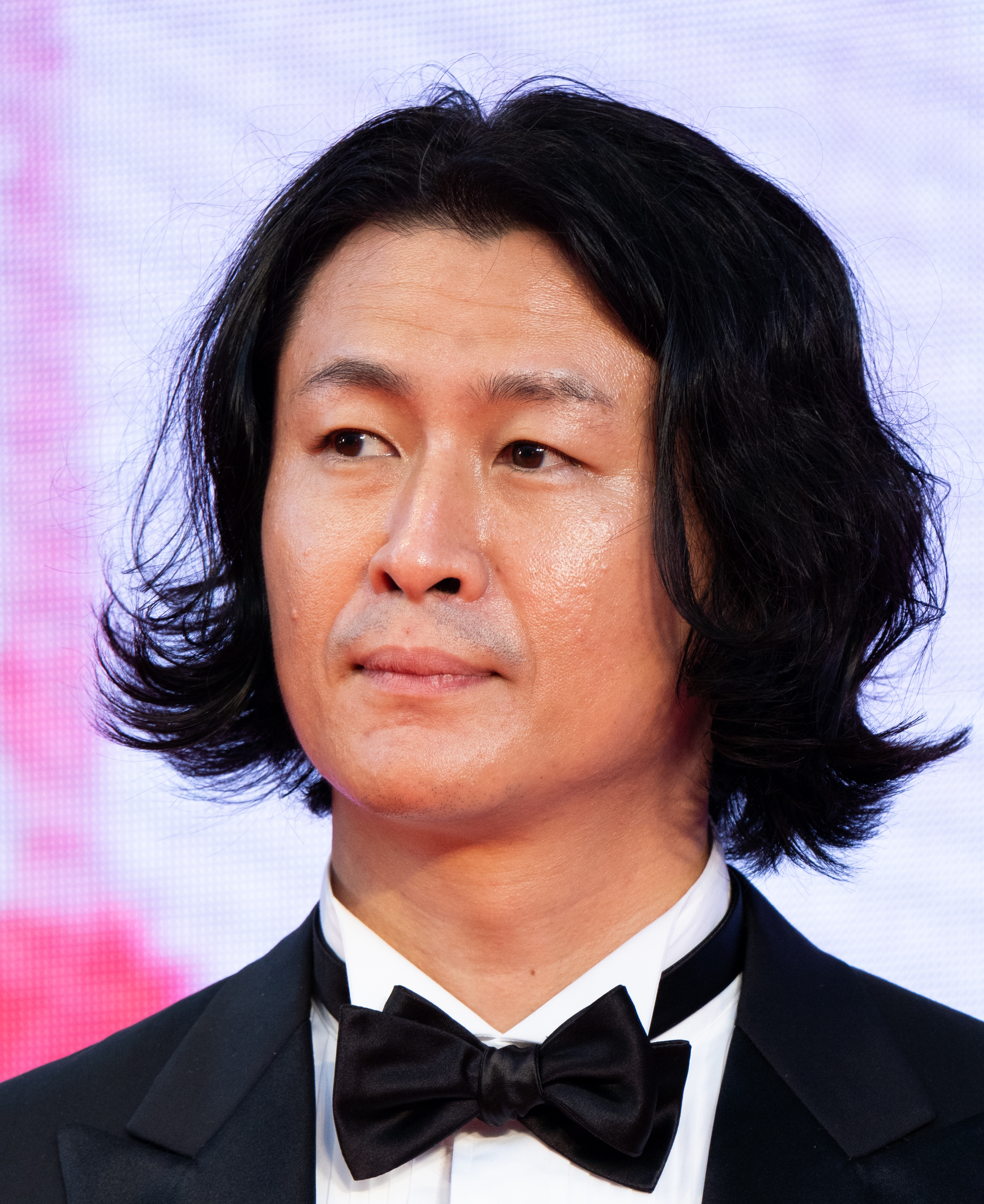
Ubukata was the main writer for the second series of Psycho-Pass

The first Psycho Pass series was first announced in late March 2012 by Fuji TV at its Noitamina press conference. In March 2013, Shiotani stated there could be a second season if the show received enough support. Psycho-Pass 2 was first announced on July 6, 2013, by Production I.G. president Mitsuhisa Ishikawa. Once development of the second season started, Shiotani said the new episodes were more difficult to make than those in the first season. He said, "it's more about the show's inflexibility" because the staff have to maintain consistency. For the second season Tow Ubukata replaced Urobuchi as the main writer. Ubukata mentions he was given the idea of expanding the setting in the form of a sequel. As a result of being given the scenario of the TV series and the film, Ubukata had to write the characters' personalities. Although the timeframe for the production was short, he had enough time to hold discussions with the first series' staff. Shiotani aided the team for the final episode which satisfied Ubukata. Gen Urobuchi claimed that both Psycho-Pass 2 and Psycho-Pass: The Movie would be more violent than the first series, advising sensitive people to avoid watching it.

Much attention was given to developing Tsunemori as a lead character since Kogami was no longer present. Additionally, the new character who works as an Inspector, Mika Shimotsuki, was given the traits of the newcomer similar to Tsunemori, but different in a way Shiotani could not explain during development as a result of the series still premiering. Since the first series was focused on Shinya Kogami and Shogo Makishima's rivalry, this time Kirito Kamui was written to be the rival of Tsunemori as a result of being her alone. Nevertheless, the staff felt that Kamui was a weaker antagonist than Makishima to the point Kogami would have easily solved the case had he been in the series. The staff were said to love Shimotsuki for the same reason that fans disliked her. Staff reported that, while Nobuchika Ginoza was used as an unlikable inspector in the first series, often the staff and the audience could not bring themselves to hate him. Given that reaction, they made Shimotsuki a less likable character.

The music is composed by Yugo Kanno. Two musical pieces are used: The series' opening theme which is "Enigmatic Feeling" by Ling Tosite Sigure, and the ending theme which is "Fallen" by Egoist. The series was collected in a total of five DVD and Blu-ray volumes between December 17, 2014, and April 15, 2015. A collection was released on July 17, 2019.

The series is licensed in North America by Funimation, who simulcast the series with English subtitles as it aired and began streaming English dubbed episodes from November 8, 2014, as part of its Broadcast Dubs initiative. Funimation released the home media in North America, while Anime Ltd released it in the United Kingdom.

A manga adaptation by Saru Hashino was published in Monthly Comic Garden by Mag Garden. Hashino launched the manga series on November 5, 2014, and ended it on February 5, 2017.

== Episodes ==
| No. overall | No. in season | Title | Original release date |
|---|---|---|---|
| 23 | 1 | "The Scales of Justice <299/300>"; Transliteration: "Seigi no Tenbin <299/300>" (Japanese: 正義の天秤〈299/300〉) | October 10, 2014 |
An explosion occurs in broad daylight and despite having no casualties, it catches the attention of the MWPSB. The police investigation determines the culprit to be Akira Kitazawa, a demolitions expert whose career was hindered after it was confirmed that his Crime Coefficient tends to increase under pressure. Upon locating Kitazawa's hideout, Inspector Akane Tsunemori realizes that he is setting a trap for them and disobeys her orders to advance and confront him. Her assumptions are proven correct, and Kitazawa escapes, apparently taking a female hostage with him, whom he soon after releases. Certain that the hostage is actually a hologram with another trap, Akane's unit keeps pursuing Kitazawa and upon cornering him, Akane notices that his Crime Coefficient is just a little over the minimum required for the Dominator to enter into Lethal Eliminator mode and decides to calm him down instead of killing him. Her plan works and she knocks him out with Non-Lethal Paralyzer mode when his Crime Coefficient drops to non-lethal levels. Elsewhere, Inspector Mizue Shisui and her partner Enforcer Yamatoya are sent after the hologram, which is revealed to actually be a man who does not register on the Dominator's scans. He injects Shisui with some kind of drug that paralyzes her. He kisses her, then takes her hand and makes her use her Dominator to kill Yamatoya, leaving behind the message "WC?", written in blood.
| 24 | 2 | "The Creeping Unknown"; Transliteration: "Shinobiyoru Kyojitsu" (Japanese: 忍び寄る虚実) | October 17, 2014 |
While trying to determine the meaning of the "WC?" message, Akane goes with Enforcer Sakuya Togane to interrogate Kitazawa, who claims that someone else helped keep his Crime Coefficient down and was responsible for the fake hostage, though another inspector, Aoyanagi, does not believe this to be true. Later, as Shion and Enforcer Sho Hinakawa learn that the fake hostage was an elaborately detailed hologram modeled after someone who died years ago, Kitazawa's Crime Coefficient suddenly drops below that of a latent criminal, resulting in him being transferred to a general medical facility. Shortly afterwards, Akane discovers another "WC?" message scrawled in her apartment, before being alerted that Kitazawa has attacked Aoyanagi and escaped, believing that his so-called assistant was the one who set up his escape route. Kitazawa is cornered by Akane's group, uttering the name "Kamui" before he is eliminated by Aoyanagi, his last words leading Akane to realize that "WC?" actually stands for "What Color?".
| 25 | 3 | "The Devil's Proof"; Transliteration: "Akuma no Shōmei" (Japanese: 悪魔の証明) | October 24, 2014 |
Shisui finds herself strapped to a chair in an unknown location with her Dominator pointed towards her and one of her eyes taken by her kidnapper, Kirito Kamui. As her fear causes her Crime Coefficient to rise, Kamui uses a peculiar method to suddenly bring it back down. Meanwhile, Akane and the others investigate the message that had appeared in her apartment and find no signs of anyone having broken in, leading some to believe Akane may have done it herself. On the way back, Akane visits Jouji Saiga, who turned himself in after helping Kogami during the Makishima incident, to hear his thoughts on the case. Later, Akane speaks with Bureau Chief Joshu Kasei, who gives Division 1 authority to look into the case and tells her to be cautious of Togane. As Akane begins her investigation, her partner Mika Shimotsuki becomes distrusting of Akane's actions, arresting a man named Kotoku Masuda who claims to know Kamui. Meanwhile, Aoyanagi, who has been contacted by Shisui and told to go to a mental care facility, finds herself lured into a trap by someone who violently attacks her while still maintaining a low Crime Coefficient and also mentioning Kamui's name.
| 26 | 4 | "The Salvation of Job"; Transliteration: "Yobu no Kyūsai" (Japanese: ヨブの救済) | October 31, 2014 |
Akane attempts to interrogate Masuda about Kamui, but he claims not to know him. Meanwhile, in the medical facility, a man has his hostages strip and starts killing them one by one to raise the others' stress levels, proclaiming himself a savior in the name of Kamui. Aoyanagi manages to retrieve her Dominator, but discovers the culprit is still below enforcement level while the hostages are above it, claiming to have had "eustress deficiency", which is believed to be an urban legend. After having Saiga look at the equipment Masuda used prior to his arrest, Akane theorizes that Kamui is somewhere within the medical facility, believing that he is somehow able to use Dominators. When Division 3 is sent to take over from Mika's group, Aoyanagi manages to take the culprit by surprise and undo the locks. However, she and all the other hostages are killed by Division 3 as a result of their high Crime Coefficients, while the culprit is also executed after bidding farewell to Kamui, who has learned that inspectors can also be judged by Dominators. Arriving on the scene to find a bloodbath, Akane discovers what is left of Aoyanagi and yet another "WC?" message.
| 27 | 5 | "Unforbidden Games"; Transliteration: "Kinjirarenai Asobi" (Japanese: 禁じられない遊び) | November 7, 2014 |
It is revealed that Kamui, who now has Shisui under his power, is using her eye in order to wield a Dominator. Meanwhile, as the MWPSB investigate the crime scene, Mika spots Togane pointing his Dominator at an unaware Akane, apparently for the purpose of checking her Crime Coefficient. The next day, as new enforcers are brought in, both Divisions 1 and 3 are sent to investigate a drone warehouse, where Akane and Togane discover a hidden area behind a holographic wall containing masks of people's faces and another "WC?" message. Just then, the drones in the factory start to activate and shoot down innocent people, unknowingly being controlled by people playing the "Hungry Chicken" mobile game. Meanwhile, as Jouji is sent to interrogate Masuda, he deduces from footage of his speeches that he is in fact a different person entirely. Mika investigates Togane's quarters and discovers an obsessive amount of files and photos of Akane.
| 28 | 6 | "Those Who Cast Stones"; Transliteration: "Ishi o Nageutsu Hitobito" (Japanese: 石を擲つ人々) | November 14, 2014 |
Karanomori manages to determine that the drones are being remotely controlled by unaware citizens playing "Hungry Chicken", which Akane believes to be connected to Kamui's messages. While Karanomori works to prevent the game from being spread any further, Akane realizes there is someone with a Dominator targeting Enforcers who stray from their Inspectors, learning that Kamui's true mission is to retrieve Dominators. Akane decides to pursue whoever is wielding the Dominators, managing to take out most of the drones by exploiting their weaknesses. When the game hacks into police drones instead, Shion and the other uses a program to gain access to the game's cloud server and show all the players what they were really doing, despite Mika's objections that it would raise everyone's Crime Coefficient. Akane soon confronts Kamui, who escapes with Shisui when Akane prevents Togane from using a traditional gun against him.
| 29 | 7 | "Untraceable Children"; Transliteration: "Mitsukaranai Kodomo-tachi" (Japanese: 見つからない子供たち) | November 21, 2014 |
As Mika's group handles the aftermath of the incident, apprehending those who were still playing the game regardless, Akane tries to determine Kamui's motives for obtaining Dominators, finding Togane to be a lot like her old partner, Shinya Kogami. After checking up on her grandmother, Akane confronts Chief Kasei over why she hasn't deactivated Shisui's Dominator privileges, deducing that Kamui is someone that Sibyl has decided cannot be integrated into their network of brains. Meanwhile, Mika looks up Togane's background from files obtained from his computer, learning all of the Inspectors he had previously worked with became latent criminals and were executed; she is unaware that Togane has found out she raided his room. As the MWPSB officers gather and examine evidence found in Kamui's hideout, Hinakawa discovers Kamui had used a hologram during the clinical incident which, along with the earlier hologram from the first case, was also taken from a child who died in a plane accident 15 years ago; Kamui is found to be the sole survivor of the accident. Akane apprehends Yohei Masuzaki, a surgeon who previously operated on Kamui and is in cahoots with him, and has Saiga interrogate him while she investigates on her own after discovering a link between Masuzaki's medical files and Togane's corporation. After Hinakawa creates holograms of all 185 victims of the plane crash, they discover that Kamui has dozens of followers right under their noses.
| 30 | 8 | "Conception of the Oracle <AA>"; Transliteration: "Miko no Kaitai <AA>" (Japanese: 巫女の懐胎<AA>) | November 28, 2014 |
Masuzaki explains to Saiga how Kamui received parts from the other 184 bodies in his surgery, including parts of seven brains, resulting in his becoming an individual unrecognized by the Sibyl System. He goes on to explain that Kamui's goal is to overturn the entire System. Meanwhile, Mika, who had been investigating the Togane Foundation's patent on the surgery, discovers that Kamui himself was the last person to access the file before her. Looking over Masuzaki's testimony, including how he killed people of influence and replaced them with impostors, Akane and the others deduce that all 184 victim holos are Kamui's personae, while the impostors used as replacements were illegal immigrants. Mika learns that the patents owned by the Togane Foundation were filed by Togane's mother, Misako, who died five years ago, and believes Kamui's goal may be to get revenge on the Togane Foundation. Mika tries filing a report with Chief Kasei, recommending that Akane be dismissed from the MWPSB as she feels she is a danger to the operation. However, Mika's research turns out to have been a trap laid by Kasei, who is revealed to be Misako Togane herself. Sakuya Togane then appears and restrains Mika, and Kasei decides to use her as a test subject and show her the truth behind Sibyl.
| 31 | 9 | "The Omnipotence Paradox"; Transliteration: "Zen'nō-sha no Paradokusu" (Japanese: 全能者のパラドクス) | December 5, 2014 |
Having revealed the truth of the Sibyl System to Mika, with her Hue remaining clear, Kasei and Togane, revealed to be an artificially created human, decide to use her for the purpose of turning Akane's Hue black. After eliminating Masuzaki, who knew too much about Kasei's identity, Togane directs Mika to locate Akane's grandmother, Aoi. Meanwhile, Akane and the others learn of an official named Koichi Kuwashima, one of Kamui's childhood friends who escaped the plane accident due to transferring schools shortly before the deadly crash, but suffering intense survivor's guilt as a result. Even as Akane and the MWPSB close in on Kuwashima, he helps Kamui exact his revenge on a company who benefited from turning a blind eye to the incident. When Akane and the others arrive at the scene, Kuwashima gives Akane a box containing Aoi's ear, enraging her. As Saiga interrogates Kuwashima, Kamui makes his next move by hijacking a subway train, while Togane does something terrible to Aoi.
| 32 | 10 | "Gauging the Soul"; Transliteration: "Tamashī no Kijun" (Japanese: 魂の基準) | December 12, 2014 |
Kamui floods the subway in order to take 500 train passengers hostage, freely using Dominators to try and spark an overload in the Sibyl System and access its bypass system. Meanwhile, Kasei orders Akane to assassinate Kamui by setting off explosives that would kill all the hostages, using the news that Aoi has been found dead to drive her towards that goal. While hesitating over what she should do, Kogami appears in Akane's conscience, encouraging her to find another option that doesn't involve killing. Akane gets into contact with Kamui and then confronts Kasei, stating her desire to overcome her plans. While Kamui manages to stop the detonation and releases the hostages, Akane confronts Togane, having deduced his true nature and goal, before Kamui appears before them, preparing to fire his Dominator at Togane.
| 33 | 11 | "What Color?" | December 19, 2014 |
Akane subdues Togane before Kamui can shoot him, stating that even though she has lost many people close to her, she is still determined to protect the law. She leads Kamui to Sibyl, where they are confronted by Kasei. Asking Sibyl to reveal its true color, Kamui manages to expose Kasei/Misako Togane's Crime Coefficient and executes her. Akane leads Kamui to Sibyl's true form, where Sibyl acknowledges Kamui's existence and authorizes a collective Psycho-Pass, destroying some of its own brains to lower its own Crime Coefficient, before Akane arrests Kamui. Meanwhile, Shisui, pushed into a corner, attempts to set off the bombs but is stopped just in time by a long range Paralyzer shot. Akane is instructed by Sibyl to execute Kamui, and is once again confronted by Togane, who taunts her with Aoi's death to raise her Crime Coefficient. Kamui calms Akane down before sacrificing himself in order to shoot Togane. Togane flees, but dies from his injuries after being found by Mika, who couldn't bring herself to execute him and keeps the secret of her betrayal to herself.

== Home media release ==
Japanese

| Name | Date | Discs | Episodes |
|---|---|---|---|
| Volume 1 | December 17, 2014 | 1 | 1–2 |
| Volume 2 | January 21, 2015 | 1 | 3–4 |
| Volume 3 | February 18, 2015 | 1 | 5–6 |
| Volume 4 | March 18, 2015 | 1 | 7–8 |
| Volume 5 | April 15, 2015 | 1 | 9–11 |
| Collection | July 17, 2019 | 1 | 1–11 |

North American

| Name | Date | Discs | Episodes |
|---|---|---|---|
| Collection | March 8, 2016 | 2 | 1–11 |

United Kingdom

| Name | Date | Discs | Episodes |
|---|---|---|---|
| Collection | May 6, 2016 | 2 | 1–11 |

== Reception ==
Feedback to Psycho-Pass 2 has ranged from mixed to negative. Dan Rhodes from UK Anime Network noted that Psycho-Pass 2, while entertaining, lacked the twists of the first season and appeal of Gen Urobuchi's writing. Richard Eisenbeis from Kotaku praised the origins of the Sybil System which was unexplained in the first season. While also praising the differences between Tsunemori and the new Inspector, Mika Shimotsuki, Eisenbeis criticized the new antagonist and how much gorier the series was in contrast to the first one. Nick Creamer from Anime News Network panned the series, giving it an overall "F" as he felt the new writer, Tow Ubukata, did not make the anime appealing despite his previous enjoyable works. He went on to say "overall, Psycho-Pass 2 stands as one of the most disappointing works I've ever watched to completion," citing it a failure as both a sequel and an independent series. Mitch Jay from Digital Rice criticized the handling of Tsunemori since the events that happen across the episodes appeared to have ruined her character arc from the first television series to the point he found the quality of the series inexcusable for the staff members.

Kotaku praised the differences between Akane and the new Inspector, Mika Shimotsuki. Anime News Network found her to be different from her original Psycho-Pass traits, citing her mistreatment of Enforcers such as Nobuchika Ginoza, and also speculated that the character might have a crush on Yayoi Kunizuka, as Shimotsuki tends to favor her instead. The Fandom Post regarded Shimotsuki as a "too divisive character to say the least", commenting on the way she is used by Togane to attack Tsunemori. It said that Shimotsuki was "a really unlikeable co-protagonist due to the fact whilst she has her own views, she always gets into trouble and never seems to accept that it is her fault", and drew negative parallels with Akane Tsunemori's arc from the original series, saying that while Tsunemori often has detractors, she still manages to become more appealing due to her screentime. UK Anime Network said that, while Shimotsuki did not come across as likable, she is made more sympathetic by the difficulties she faces as a result of Togane and Sybil's manipulations. According to My Reviewer, while the series starts strong, by the eighth episode, the series jumps the shark due to poor handling of characters that make a major impact in the story. Nevertheless, the writer found the visual and voice acting appealing

In retrospective, Robert Frazer of UK Anime Network panned the anime, citing it as so unlikable he would rather see the prequel focused on Shinya Kogami's work as an inspector written in a manga. Comic Book Resources also panned it, calling it one of the biggest disappointments within anime as it failed to live up to the first series' popularity, lacking the cast that made it interesting, and the poor handling of Kirito Kamui's traps to the Sybil System.
