= I've Been Killing Slimes for 300 Years and Maxed Out My Level =

Japanese light novel series

- Cover of the first volume of the light novel, featuring Azusa Aizawa

スライム倒して300年、知らないうちにレベルMAXになってました (Suraimu Taoshite Sanbyaku-nen, Shiranai Uchi ni Reberu Makkusu ni Nattemashita)
- Genre: Isekai
- Novel series
- Written by: Kisetsu Morita
- Published by: Shōsetsuka ni Narō
- Original run: June 23, 2016 – November 18, 2021
- Light novel
- Written by: Kisetsu Morita
- Illustrated by: Benio
- Published by: SB Creative
- English publisher: NA: Yen Press
- Imprint: GA Novel
- Original run: January 14, 2017 – October 15, 2026
- Volumes: 30
Further information
Manga
Illustrated by	Yūsuke Shiba
Published by	Square Enix
English publisher	NA: Yen Press
Magazine	Gangan Online; Manga Up! (Note: The serialization on "Manga Up!" started on February 12, 2018.)
Original run	June 29, 2017 – present
Volumes	18
Light novel
I Was a Bottom-Tier Bureaucrat for 1,500 Years, and the Demon King Made Me a Minister
Written by	Kisetsu Morita
Illustrated by	Benio
Published by	Square Enix (ep. 1–2, 4, 6, 8, 12) (Note: The serialization in Gangan Online was from July 13 to September 28, 2017.); SB Creative (ep. 3, 5, 7, 9–11,13–)
English publisher	NA: Yen Press
Imprint	GA Novel
Magazine	Gangan Online (ep. 1–2, 4, 6, 8, 12)
Original run	July 13, 2017 – August 11, 2022
Volumes	1
Light novel
Food for an Elf
Written by	Kisetsu Morita
Illustrated by	Benio
Published by	Square Enix
English publisher	NA: Yen Press
Imprint	GA Novel
Magazine	Gangan Online; Manga Up! (Note: The serialization on Manga Up! started on April 13, 2018.)
Original run	April 12, 2018 – June 28, 2018
Manga
I Was a Bottom-Tier Bureaucrat for 1,500 Years, and the Demon King Made Me a Minister
Illustrated by	Meishi Murakami
Published by	Square Enix
English publisher	NA: Yen Press
Magazine	Gangan Online; Manga Up! (Note: The serialization on Manga Up! started on March 4, 2019.)
Original run	January 31, 2019 – August 20, 2020
Volumes	3
Light novel
Red Dragon Women Academy
Written by	Kisetsu Morita
Illustrated by	Benio
Published by	Square Enix (ep. 1–6) (Note: The serialization in Manga Up! and Gangan Online was from July 15 to November 9, 2019.); Shōsetsuka ni Narō (ep. 7) (Note: The serialization in Shōsetsuka ni Narō was from January 24 to February 1, 2021.); SB Creative (ep. 8–)
Imprint	GA Novel
Magazine	Manga Up! (ep. 1–6); Gangan Online (ep. 1–6) (Note: The serialization on "Gangan Online" started on August 29, 2019.); Shōsetsuka ni Narō (ep. 7)
Original run	July 15, 2019 – December 14, 2021
Novel series
The White Journey of Margrave
Written by	Kisetsu Morita
Published by	Shōsetsuka ni Narō
Imprint	GA Novel
Original run	March 25, 2021 – March 29, 2021
Manga
Red Dragon Women Academy
Illustrated by	Hitsujibako
Published by	Square Enix
English publisher	NA: Yen Press
Magazine	Manga Up!; Gangan Online (Note: The serialization on Gangan Online app started on April 10, 2021; on Gangan Online web started on April 29, 2021.)
Original run	March 29, 2021 – present
Volumes	2
Anime television series
Directed by	Nobukage Kimura (S1); Kunihisa Sugishima (S2)
Produced by	Daichi Amano; Tomoyuki Oowada; Yutaka Kashiwagi (S1); Takumi Itou (S1); Shouta Komatsu (S1); Yoshinori Hasegawa (S1); Jun Morita (S1); Souji Miyagi (S1); Yuuichi Izumi (S1); Tadayuki Akita (S1); Mitsuhiro Nanbara (S1); Kazuki Matsumoto (S2); Takahiro Yamanaka (S2); Aya Iizuka (S2); Akihiro Sotokawa (S2); Fumihiro Ozawa (S2); Tatsuya Ueki (S2); Youhei Hata (S2); Tomoko Fujimura (S2)
Written by	Tatsuya Takahashi (S1); Naohiro Fukushima (S2)
Music by	Keiji Inai
Studio	Revoroot (S1); Teddy (S2)
Licensed by	Crunchyroll; SA/SEA: Muse Communication
Original network	AT-X, Tokyo MX, BS11, SUN, HTB, NCC (S1-2); KBS Kyoto, IBC (S1); GYT, UX, HAB (S2)
English network	SEA: Animax Asia; US: Crunchyroll Channel
Original run	April 10, 2021 – June 21, 2025
Episodes	24
- icon

I've Been Killing Slimes for 300 Years and Maxed Out My Level (Japanese: スライム倒して300年、知らないうちにレベルMAXになってました, Hepburn: Suraimu Taoshite Sanbyaku-nen, Shiranai Uchi ni Reberu Makkusu ni Nattemashita) is a Japanese light novel series written by Kisetsu Morita and illustrated by Benio. It was serialized online since 2016 on the user-generated novel publishing website Shōsetsuka ni Narō and, in the following year, it was acquired by SB Creative, who published the first light novel volume in 2017. (Note: After that, the serialization on Shōsetsuka ni Narō ended in November 2021.) The light novel has been licensed in North America by Yen Press, who published the first volume in April 2018. It has received a manga adaptation by Yūsuke Shiba in the same year as its debut of the light novel in Square Enix's Gangan Online website, also licensed by Yen Press. An anime television series adaptation by Revoroot aired from April to June 2021. A second season by Teddy aired from April to June 2025. The series has also spawned various spin-off novels.

== Plot ==
After living as an office worker on Earth, Azusa ends up dying from overworking. She finds herself reincarnated as an undying, unaging witch in a new world by a goddess, and vows to spend her days as pleasantly and stress-free as possible. She makes a living by hunting slimes, the easiest targets. But after three centuries of doing this simple job, she has become extremely powerful and finds that she can no longer maintain her low-key lifestyle. In time, she gains an adoptive family and becomes friends with many female beings.

== Characters ==
Azusa Aizawa (アズサ・アイザワ / 相沢梓, Aizawa Azusa)
Voiced by: Aoi Yūki (Japanese); Skyler Davenport (English)
A former Japanese office worker reincarnated as an immortal witch, called "the Witch of the Highlands" (高原の魔女, Kōgen no Majo), who, as her name implies, live in the highlands overlooking Flatta Village, a "starter village" for aspiring adventurers. After slaying millions of slimes for over 300 years, she maxed out her level at 99. Wary of any overwork and excitement following her untimely death, she strives for an easy, slow-life existence. But once word gets out about her unprecedented prowess, she finds herself beleaguered by challengers trying to prove themselves against her, and all sorts of people willing to join her, much to her chagrin. However, she is compassionate and in time becomes very protective of her adoptive family and friends. She soon receives an upgrade that enables her to temporarily break her level cap and match the power of a god.
Laika (ライカ, Raika)
Voiced by: Kaede Hondo (Japanese); Rachelle Heger (English)
A roughly 300-year-old shape-shifting red dragon girl. Originally arrogant, she came to Azusa to fight her and prove herself to be stronger than her. After getting soundly beaten by Azusa for wrecking her house, she joins her as her first apprentice and housekeeper, eventually becoming her adoptive younger sister. She is very diligent and is averse to disorder, as shown when she volunteered to clean Beelzebub's mansion after seeing its disorderly state. She has a rivalry with Flatorte.
Falfa (ファルファ, Farufa)
Voiced by: Sayaka Senbongi (Japanese); Lizzie Freeman (English)
An about 50-year-old slime spirit girl, and the elder of twin sisters. She is one of Azusa's adoptive daughters. Both she and her sister Shalsha are reincarnations of the slime creatures that Azusa killed for a living, though she took it well and wishes to see her "mother", comtrary to Shalsha who wanted to kill her. Although appears to be a cute, happy-go-lucky girl, she is surprisingly smart and mature, often being the one who calms Shalsha when she gets moody.
Shalsha (シャルシャ, Sharusha)
Voiced by: Minami Tanaka (Japanese); Suzie Yeung (English)
Falfa's younger slime spirit twin sister. She is one of Azusa's adoptive daughters. Driven by feelings of revenge against Azusa for killing all the slimes, she learned a type of magic which is effective against one specific race only, but in turn is potent enough to counter even Azusa's magic; she is also very learned in magic lore. After being knocked out by Laika, Shalsha and Falfa join Azusa's household upon her invitation. In turn, she abandoned her desire for revenge upon learning that Azusa is not the only one targeting slimes. She is very inquisitive, and habitually takes notes of anything new she comes across. Despite her stoic demeanor, she can sometimes be sensitive, and often led around by her emotions.
Halkara (ハルカラ, Harukara)
Voiced by: Sayaka Harada (Japanese); Xanthe Huynh (English)
A young (about 225-year-old) female elf apothecary from Frant Province with very abrupt mood swings and a voluptuous build. She invented an extremely popular, alcohol-based energy drink; but when the demon lord Beelzebub drank from it, she became sick (from overworking after getting addicted to it) and then went after Halkara to get more of her products. The elf, believing that Beelzebub wanted revenge, fled to Azusa for protection. After being given shelter, and after the misunderstanding with Beelzebub is cleared, Halkara decides to stay with Azusa and restart the production of her energy drink in Flatta village, due to cheaper taxes and her already being ousted from her hometown due to Beelzebub looking for her. She is very knowledgeable about mushrooms, but is scatterbrained and accident-prone. She has a rivalry with Eno due to their habits of stealing each other's ideas.
Beelzebub (ベルゼブブ, Beruzebubu)
Voiced by: Manami Numakura (Japanese); Erica Mendez (English)
An about 3,000-year-old high-ranking female demon, the Agriculture Minister of the Demon Realm, and Lord of the Flies. Chasing after Halkara after getting addicted to her energy drink (so that its production could be restarted) she challenges Azusa to a fight. But she was then zapped by Azusa's barrier, collapses from exhaustion and is nursed back to health by her and Halkara. After the misunderstanding was cleared, she leaves peacefully, but vows to come back to settle her score with Azusa and get more of Halkara's drink, although she begins to settle in with Azusa's family as her older sister figure, but does not really live with her. She loves cute things and kids, and treats Falfa and Shalsha as if they are her daughters, much to Azusa's chagrin.
Despite appearing to be lazy and freeloading while she is in Azusa's residence, she is actually a hardworker and quite respected by her peers, and she is the only one that can keep the Demon Queen Pecora in line when she is up to her antics.
It is later revealed that Beelzebub was a commoner before becoming a minister. She was given a mansion after assuming her station, but due to her commoner background, she has no idea how to clean it aside from a few rooms that she uses.
Flatorte (フラットルテ, Furattorute)
Voiced by: Azumi Waki (Japanese); Amber Lee Connors (English)
An over 400-year-old blue dragon girl who first meets Azusa and her extended family while she and her flock attempt to disrupt the wedding of Laika's older sister, out of simple jealousy that her blunt demeanor drove away her own fiance. After Azusa single-handedly thrashes the aggressors, and a final act of aggression is stalled by Beelzebub, she is forced to sign a peace treaty between the red and blue dragons. Afterwards, as part of her peace obligations, she joins Azusa's family—the only alternative being to commit suicide due to her culture. Initially joining as Azusa's "slave" due to her horns being touched by her (in part due to Pecora's machinations), Azusa gave her a new command to "live as she sees fit", technically granting her freedom while still honoring her tribe's tradition. She then became the family's fighter and Azusa's middle sister figure.
Flatorte is easily excitable, short-tempered, and often gets into fights with Laika, often over Azusa's attention. However, she has a penchant for music, which is how she managed to bond with Kuki.
Rosalie (ロザリー, Rozarī)
Voiced by: Riho Sugiyama (Japanese); Anne Yatco (English)
A ghost girl who died about 200 years previously at the age of 15. The daughter of a merchant who had fallen on hard times, she committed suicide after learning that her father wanted to sell her off as a prostitute. Her restless ghost began haunting the merchant's estate, which later became the site for Halkara's new energy drink factory. After being caught by Azusa, Halkara and Beelzebub, she is, with some effort, relocated to Azusa's house and joins her adoptive family. She is good friends with Muu.
Fatla (ファートラ, Fātora)
Voiced by: Miku Itō (Japanese); Veronica Taylor (season 1), Abigail Blythe (season 2) (English)
A leviathan woman, Beelzebub's secretary, and Vania's older sister. She and Vania are both shapeshifters, able to assume the form of a gigantic, flying whale. Despite the myth that leviathans are water creatures, they are actually air dwellers, and are usually employed as living transportation (complete with a resort hotel on their backs) by demons, devils and their privileged guests. To fulfill this obligation, both sisters work in tandem: while one does the transport, the other uses the hotel facilities (especially the bath) to relax.
Compared to Vania, Fatla is more professional and serious while working, but has a penchant for pulling pranks, just like her sister.
Vania (ヴァーニア, Vānia)
Voiced by: Ari Ozawa (Japanese); Allegra Clark (English)
A leviathan woman, Beelzebub's assistant secretary, and Fatla's younger sister.
Although appears to be unprofessional and scatterbrained while working, she is actually just as competent as her sister when she put her back into it. However, she also adopts her sister's love for pranks.
Pecora / Provat Pecora Allières (ペコラ / プロヴァト・ペコラ・アリエース, Pekora / Purovato Pekora Ariēsu)
Voiced by: Yukari Tamura (Japanese); Corina Boettger (English)
An over 1,000-year-old demon girl and the "King" of the Demon Realm from its capital city Vanzeld. Despite her awe-inspiring title, her natural form is a cute, petite girl with ram horns and three tails, and she is, most of the time, surprisingly cheerful and informal. She has also a submission complex; after being accidentally knocked out by Halkara, and with Azusa beating her in a duel over Halkara's life, she gladly submits to her "conqueror". She now considers herself to be Azusa's younger sister and is very obsessive with her. She later forms an alliance with Muu.
Smart Slime (賢いスライム, Kashikoi Suraimu; lit. 'Wise slime')
In manga: Smarsly / Smart Slime (賢スラ / 賢いスライム, Kensura / Kashikoi Suraimu)
In anime: Intellie / Intelligent Slime (賢スラ / 賢いスライム, Kensura / Kashikoi Suraimu)
A normal slime which is completely black.
Smarsly (in manga) / Intellie (in anime) is name given to it by Azusa. (Shortened name is used in light novel volume 12 and later.)
Unlike other evolved slimes, it cannot talk, thus it depends on a blackboard that resembles a Japanese keyboard to communicate.
Wizly / Wizard Slime (マースラ / 魔法使いスライム, Māsura / Mahō Tsukai Suraimu; lit. 'Magic user slime')
In anime: Magie / Magician Slime (マースラ / 魔法使いスライム, Māsura / Mahō Tsukai Suraimu)
Voiced by: Miyuri Shimabukuro
A magician slime girl who looks like 15-year-old blond girl, but is 300-year-old. She can communicate with slimes by putting her face on them.
Wizly (in light novel and manga) / Magie (in anime) is name given to her by Azusa.
Fighsly / Fighter Slime (ブッスラー / 武道家スライム, Bussurā / Budōka Suraimu; lit. 'Budō (Japanese martial arts) expert slime')
In anime: Fightie / Fighter Slime (ブッスラー / 武道家スライム, Bussurā / Budōka Suraimu)
Voiced by: Ayasa Itō (Japanese); Veronica Taylor (season 1), Abigail Blythe (season 2) (English)
An about 300-year-old fighter slime girl whom Azusa and the others seek out when Falfa is stuck in slime form after getting a crick in her neck. She is very materialistic and considers fighting a means to collect more and more prizes. After being easily beaten by Azusa, she considers joining her as a martial arts apprentice, but instead becomes Beelzebub's apprentice after learning about the slimes that Azusa killed.
Fighsly (in light novel and manga) / Fightie (in anime) is name which she herself decided to use, and was not given to her by Azusa.
Eno (エノ, Eno)
Voiced by: Hikaru Tono (Japanese); Anairis Quiñones (English)
An over 150-year-old witch, called "the Witch of the Grotto" (洞窟の魔女, Dōkutsu no Majo). Naive and deadly shy, but yearning for recognition, she usurps the title of "Highland Witch" to capitalize on Azusa's reputation and make herself some new friends. When Azusa hears of the fake, she confronts Eno and afterwards helps her in selling her mandragora-based medicines, which prove extremely popular. Her title stems from the location of her workshop, which is situated inside a hard-to-reach underground location, thus contributing to her initial lack of renown. She became rivals with Halkara since they are known to steal each other's ideas.
Pondeli (ポンデリ, Ponderi)
Voiced by: Yūko Ōno^{Season 2 Ep. 2 credits} (Japanese); Nia Celeste (English)
An undead catgirl who died 40 years ago after she became so lazy and reclusive that she forgot to even feed herself. After rising from death, she became a graveyard security guard, but felt lonely without anyone keeping her company. When she does not want to go to the Demon Realm under Beelzebub's pressure, Azusa suggested to Beelzebub that Pondeli is to be made a game shop owner in the Demon Realm, since the catgirl is wickedly good at playing cards.
She would later create her own trading card game called, "Ket Ket", which proves to be extremely popular in the Demon Realm and beyond.
Leila (レイラ, Reira)
Voiced by: Sakura Nakamura
Laika's older sister, who marries later in the story.
Natalie (ナタリー, Natarī)
Voiced by: Sayaka Kikuchi (Japanese); Ryan Bartley (English)
The current owner of Flatta's guild. Very inquisitive and a huge fan of Azusa, she long desires to have a husband.
Domremy (ドムレミ, Domuremi)
Voiced by: Tadaaki Doi^{Season 2 Ep. 6 credits}
A knight who once fought Laika and Fightie in a martial arts tournament.
Gandada
A hulking fighter in the martial arts tournament.
Cervin (セルヴァン, Seruvan)
A demon who serves as one of the Four Heavenly Kings in Pecora's castle.
Kuku (クク, Kuku)
Voiced by: Kotori Koiwai
An about 80-year-old almiraj minstrel girl. Initially, she has an alternate persona called Schifanoia, who plays death metal music that is highly unpopular and is considered noise pollution. After Azusa and Flatorte pivots her to pop music, she became extremely popular throughout the continent, though she still wishes to play death metal music sometimes, which Flatorte encouraged.
Yufufu (ユフフ, Yufufu)
Voiced by: Ai Kayano^{Season 2 Ep. 2 credits} (Japanese); Kristin Sutton (English)
A droplet spirit woman. She becomes Azusa's adoptive mother, which would also make her Falfa, Shalsha, and Sandra's adoptive grandmother.
Sandra (サンドラ, Sandora)
Voiced by: Yui Ogura
Sandra is a mandragora girl over 300 years old, capable of burrowing swiftly through the ground. Initially fearful of witches, who sought to use her for medicinal purposes, she eventually trusts Azusa after realizing her protective nature, as well as having no desire to turn her into medicine and joins her family as her third adoptive daughter. Azusa names her, and Sandra forms close bonds with Falfa and Shalsha. Though initially wary of Halkara due to her prejudice against elves, Sandra gradually warms to her. She possesses extensive knowledge of agriculture and crop cultivation.
Misjantie (ミスジャンティー, Misujantī)
Voiced by: Azusa Tadokoro^{Season 2 Ep. 7 credits}
A pine spirit woman who resides in a temple. She is a being who mediates marriages. After Azusa helps resolve her problem, she creates another temple in Azusa's village. Having a keen business intuition, she forms a partnership with Mega-mega.
Curalina (キュアリーナ, Kyuarīna)
Voiced by: Manaka Iwami^{Season 2 Ep. 8 credits}
An about 60,000 to 70,000-year-old jellyfish spirit and wandering artist woman. A listless and "go-with-the-flow" girl, her only power is to make jellyfish glow. Due to her belief that every living being has a darkness hidden inside them, she portrays all of the subjects she draws as grimdark, Lovecraftian beings, making most of her audience extremely uncomfortable, even to the point of driving them into despair.
However, this does not mean she is a bad artist, as she has a photographic eye for detail, that one of her paintings are used as a clue for Beelzebub and Pecora to discover an ancient kingdom of dead spirits.
Goodly Godly Godness (メガーメガ神, Megāmega Shin)
Voiced by: Kikuko Inoue (Japanese); Veronica Taylor (season 1), Abigail Blythe (season 2) (English)
An executive-level goddess who managed various worlds, including both Earth and the fantasy world that Azusa eventually reincarnated into. When she comes to Azusa's world, she assumes the alias Mega-mega. It is later revealed she was demoted due to the fact that her method of reincarnating people as immortal young women is becoming an issue for all the other gods, forcing her to work with other lower gods in Azusa's world. She created the "Virtue Stamp Card" as a means to gather virtue, which the world's presiding god Nintan wholly rejects. She has a good business relationship with Misjantie, owing to their similar line of business pracitces.
Muu / Muum Muum (ムー / ムーム・ムーム, Mū / Mūmu Mūmu)
Voiced by: Hinaki Yano^{Season 2 Ep. 8 credits}
A ghost girl. Sovereign of the ghost's kingdom of the dead. She died at 15 years old, and about 5,000 years have passed since her death. Since then, she had refused to come out from her tomb because she thinks her people are boring and does not have any friends due to her status as queen (in actuality, it is because she tried to do manzai jokes, and her subjects lack the emotion to play along with her jokes). After befriending Rosalie, she forms an alliance with Pecora.
Unlike most people, she speaks in the "language of royalty", which sounds like Kansai dialect.
Nahna Nahna (ナーナ・ナーナ, Nāna Nāna)
Voiced by: Reina Kondō^{Season 2 Ep. 8 credits}
A ghost girl who serves as Muu's maid and chief minister. Very stoic and wholly lacks emotion, she is unable to understand Muu's jokes, causing her to shut herself in out of boredom.
After Muu was convinced to leave her room, Nahna slowly learned to play along with her jokes.
The Goddess Nintan (ニンタン神, Nintan Shin)
Voiced by: Kei Shindō
The goddess of time, who is long worshipped in Azusa's world. She is Mega-mega's rival. Nintan is very stubborn and arrogant, known to turn people into frogs if they oppose her. Azusa and Mega-mega go to confront her after she disapproves of Mega-mega's virtue stamp card antics. After Azusa beats her in a match, Nintan establishes a good relationship with her and agrees to let go of her personal issues towards Mega-mega's methods.
Wynona (シローナ, Shirōna)
A slime spirit girl born after Falfa and Shalsha.

== Media ==
=== Light novels ===
Originally, the series was published by Kisetsu Morita on the user-generated web novel site Shōsetsuka ni Narō in 2016. The publisher SB Creative acquired the series and then began publishing it on their GA Novel imprint as a light novel on January 14, 2017. The 30th and last volume was released on October 15, 2026.

No.	Original release date	Original ISBN	English release date	English ISBN
01	January 14, 2017	978-4-7973-9044-5	April 24, 2018	978-0-316-44828-4
02	April 15, 2017	978-4-7973-9176-3	August 21, 2018	978-0-316-44830-7
03	July 15, 2017	978-4-7973-9295-1	December 11, 2018	978-1-9753-2937-2
04	October 13, 2017	978-4-7973-9296-8	April 23, 2019	978-1-9753-8264-3
05	January 15, 2018	978-4-7973-9297-5; 978-4-7973-9298-2 (SE)	September 3, 2019	978-1-9753-8266-7
06	April 13, 2018	978-4-7973-9617-1	December 24, 2019	978-1-9753-8268-1
07	July 14, 2018	978-4-7973-9619-5; 978-4-7973-9618-8 (SE)	June 23, 2020	978-1-9753-1292-3
08	November 15, 2018	978-4-7973-9913-4	October 27, 2020	978-1-9753-1482-8
09	March 15, 2019	978-4-8156-0096-9; 978-4-8156-0097-6 (SE)	January 19, 2021	978-1-9753-1834-5
10	August 09, 2019	978-4-8156-0274-1	August 24, 2021	978-1-9753-1835-2
11	December 12, 2019	978-4-8156-0275-8	January 18, 2022	978-1-9753-3979-1
12	April 14, 2020	978-4-8156-0559-9; 978-4-8156-0276-5 (SE)	May 24, 2022	978-1-9753-4053-7
13	July 14, 2020	978-4-8156-0705-0	November 8, 2022	978-1-9753-4055-1
14	October 14, 2020	978-4-8156-0651-0; 978-4-8156-0650-3 (SE)	January 30, 2024	978-1-9753-4058-2
15	January 14, 2021	978-4-8156-0706-7	November 19, 2024	978-1-9753-6193-8
16	April 13, 2021	978-4-8156-0708-1; 978-4-8156-0707-4 (SE)	April 1, 2025	978-1-9753-8873-7
17	June 12, 2021	978-4-8156-1090-6	November 11, 2025	978-1-9753-8875-1
18	September 14, 2021	978-4-8156-1091-3	July 14, 2026	978-1-9753-8877-5
19	December 14, 2021	978-4-8156-1347-1	December 8, 2026	978-1-9753-8879-9
20	April 14, 2022	978-4-8156-1393-8	—	—
21	August 11, 2022	978-4-8156-1640-3	—	—
22	January 16, 2023	978-4-8156-1873-5	—	—
23	July 14, 2023	978-4-8156-2034-9	—	—
24	November 14, 2023	978-4-8156-2035-6	—	—
25	August 9, 2024	978-4-8156-2707-2	—	—
26	December 15, 2024	978-4-8156-2708-9	—	—
27	April 12, 2025	978-4-8156-2709-6	—	—
28	June 14, 2025	978-4-8156-3200-7	—	—
29	January 15, 2026	978-4-8156-3732-3	—	—
30	October 15, 2026	978-4-8156-3733-0	—	—

In the volumes 5 to 7, 20, and 21 of the light novel, a special story about the character Beelzebub was published at the end of those volumes. In September 2019, those stories were compiled into its own volume and the spin-off, called I Was a Bottom-Tier Bureaucrat for 1,500 Years, and the Demon King Made Me a Minister (ヒラ役人やって1500年、魔王の力で大臣にされちゃいました, Hira Yakunin Yatte 1500-nen, Maō no Chikara de Daijin ni Sarechaimashita), published by SB Creative on the GA Novel imprint with Kisetsu Morita and Benio as the author and illustrator, respectively.

No.	Original release date	Original ISBN	English release date	English ISBN
—	September 13, 2019	978-4-8156-0116-4	March 30, 2021	978-1-9753-1829-1

In the volumes 8 to 10 of the light novel, another spin-off light novel called Food for an Elf' (Japanese: エルフのごはん, Hepburn: Erufu no Gohan), a special story about the character Halkara was published at the end of those volumes.

In the volumes 11 to 13, 16, and 18 to 19 of the light novel, another spin-off light novel called Red Dragon Women Academy (レッドドラゴン女学院, Reddo Doragon Jogakuin; lit. Red Dragon Girls' Secondary School) a special story about the character Laika was published at the end of those volumes.

In the volume 17 of the light novel, another spin-off light novel called The White Journey of Margrave (Japanese: 辺境伯の真っ白旅, Hepburn: Henkyōhaku no Masshiro Tabi), a special story about the character Wynona was published at the end of that volume.

=== Manga ===
In June 2017, Square Enix began publishing a manga adaptation of the series by Yūsuke Shiba in their online website and smartphone app Gangan Online, with eighteen tankōbon volumes released as of August 2026.

No.	Original release date	Original ISBN	English release date	English ISBN
1	January 12, 2018	978-4-7575-5582-2	January 28, 2020	978-1-9753-3302-7
2	June 22, 2018	978-4-7575-5751-2	May 26, 2020	978-1-9753-0917-6
3	November 13, 2018	978-4-7575-5912-7	October 10, 2020	978-1-9753-0920-6
4	April 12, 2019	978-4-7575-6085-7	February 9, 2021	978-1-9753-0923-7
5	September 12, 2019	978-4-7575-6286-8	March 9, 2021	978-1-9753-1752-2
6	February 12, 2020	978-4-7575-6502-9	June 22, 2021	978-1-9753-1793-5
7	September 12, 2020	978-4-7575-6749-8	December 14, 2021	978-1-9753-3577-9
8	March 12, 2021	978-4-7575-7122-8; 978-4-7575-7123-5 (SE)	April 26, 2022	978-1-9753-4068-1
9	June 11, 2021	978-4-7575-7321-5	August 2, 2022	978-1-9753-4735-2
10	December 10, 2021	978-4-7575-7630-8	March 21, 2023	978-1-9753-4990-5
11	June 10, 2022	978-4-7575-7965-1	September 19, 2023	978-1-9753-7167-8
12	December 12, 2022	978-4-7575-8307-8	January 30, 2024	978-1-9753-7542-3
13	July 12, 2023	978-4-7575-8663-5	July 23, 2024	978-1-9753-9284-0
14	February 9, 2024	978-4-7575-9050-2	February 18, 2025	979-8-8554-1011-2
15	August 9, 2024	978-4-7575-9353-4	August 26, 2025	979-8-8554-1591-9
16	March 12, 2025	978-4-7575-9739-6	May 26, 2026	979-8-8554-2662-5
17	December 11, 2025	978-4-301-00168-3	February 23, 2027	979-8-8554-4848-1
18	August 10, 2026	978-4-301-00705-0	—	—

A manga adaptation of the spin-off light novel I Was a Bottom-Tier Bureaucrat for 1,500 Years, and the Demon King Made Me a Minister was launched on Square Enix's Gangan Online website and smartphone app, with Meishi Murakami reprising his work.

No.	Original release date	Original ISBN	English release date	English ISBN
1	September 12, 2019	978-4-7575-6287-5	April 20, 2021	978-1-9753-2410-0
2	February 12, 2020	978-4-7575-6503-6	December 28, 2021	978-1-9753-2412-4
3	September 12, 2020	978-4-7575-6750-4	April 26, 2022	978-1-9753-3805-3

A manga adaptation of the spin-off light novel Red Dragon Women Academy was launched on Square Enix's Manga UP! smartphone app, with Hitsujibako reprising his work.

No.	Original release date	Original ISBN	English release date	English ISBN
1	December 10, 2021	978-4-7575-7631-5	August 22, 2023	978-1-9753-6650-6
2	August 9, 2024	978-4-7575-9354-1	July 22, 2025	979-8-8554-1593-3

=== Anime ===
An anime television series adaptation was announced during a livestream for the "GA Fes 2019" event on October 19, 2019. It is animated by Revoroot and directed by Nobukage Kimura, with Tatsuya Takahashi handling series' composition, Keisuke Goto designing the characters, and Keiji Inai composing the series' music. The series aired from April 10 to June 26, 2021, on AT-X and other networks. The opening theme song is "Gudafuwa Everyday" (ぐだふわエブリデー; 'Gudaguda and Fluffy Everyday'), performed by Aoi Yūki, while the ending theme song is "Viewtiful Days!", performed by Azumi Waki. Crunchyroll streamed the series outside of Asia. In the South-eastern parts of Asia, Muse Communication licensed the series. The series was broadcast on Animax Asia in the region.

In January 2022, it was announced that the series would receive a second season. It is animated by Teddy and directed by Kunihisa Sugishima, with Naohiro Fukushima handling series' composition, Hikaru Kodama designing the characters, and Keiji Inai returning to compose the series' music. The season aired on April 5 to June 21, 2025. The opening theme song is "So Lucky", performed by Yui Ogura, while the ending theme song is "Eeny, Meeny, Miny, Moe" (イニミニマニモ), performed by Aguri Ōnishi.

==== Season 1 (2021) ====
No. overall	No. in season	Title	Directed by	Written by	Original release date
Special	—	"Special Program Just Before Broadcast"; Transliteration: "Hōsō Chokuzen Tokuban" (Japanese: 放送直前特番)	Taku Sawada	N/A	April 4, 2021
1	1	"I Maxed Out My Level"; Transliteration: "Reberu Makkusu ni Natteita" (Japanese: レベルMAXになっていた)	Nobukage Kimura	Tatsuya Takahashi	April 10, 2021
Aizawa Azusa has overworked herself to death at twenty-seven years old. A sympathetic Goddess reincarnates her as an immortal witch in a new world. Azusa is determined to live a peaceful life, building a farm in the mountains and hunting slimes every day to pass the time. Three hundred years has passed, and she becomes known as the Witch of the Highlands by the people of Flatta village due to her medicinal knowledge. On a whim, she has the adventurer's guild measure her powers and finds the experience of killing multiple slimes every day for 300 years is equal to defeating 4380 dragons. She is now the strongest adventurer in the entire world. Soon, her carefree life is repeatedly interrupted by challengers, including Laika, a legendary dragon, who challenges her and is defeated, though she accidentally destroys Azusa's house. Laika returns in the form of a young girl, hands over her treasure hoard to repair Azusa's home, and asks to become Azusa's pupil. Hoping it may make her life easier in the long run, Azusa accepts Laika as her pupil/maid, deciding to show her a little daily effort can go a long way, starting with building them a bigger house to live in.
2	2	"Along Came the Girl"; Transliteration: "Musume ga Kita" (Japanese: 娘が来た)	Nanase Tomii	Yutaka Yasunaga	April 17, 2021
Azusa is watched by a girl who swears revenge. Laika reveals attacks by villains and monsters are likely to increase now people know Azusa is strong, so they place a magic barrier around Flatta village. A child named Falfa arrives and claims her sister, Shalsha (the girl from before), is trying to kill Azusa, and Azusa is their mother. Azusa learns the sisters are actually 50 year old Slime Spirits formed from the souls of every slime Azusa has killed. While Falfa considers Azusa their mother, Shalsha wants revenge for the slimes. Azusa's magic is useless as Shalsha reveals she trained for fifty years to perfect her Smite Evil spell against Azusa. Laika protects Azusa and easily defeats Shalsha. Falfa explains Shalsha only trained Smite Evil to defeat Azusa, she is defenseless against everything else, and Shalsha will not be able to use it again for at least another fifty years. Forced to give up her grudge upon learning that Azusa is not the only one killing slimes and that the reason why people slay them is because they do not understand them, Shalsha decides to live happily. Azusa decides to become their mother and invites them to live with her. Shalsha agrees that Azusa can keep killing slimes, but only the white ones, which are evil. Azusa decides a life with a dragon pupil and slime daughters can be peaceful too.
3	3	"Along Came an Elf"; Transliteration: "Erufu ga Kita" (Japanese: エルフが来た)	Ryūta Imaizumi; Yoshiyuki Kumeda	Naohiro Fukushima	April 24, 2021
Halkara, an elf girl, appears at Azusa's home seeking help against the demon Beelzebub. She explains she created Nutri-Spirit, an energy drink, but it made Beelzebub ill, so she fled to avoid punishment. Azusa agrees to take Halkara as her student and puts a barrier around her house. While gathering mushrooms, Halkara carelessly eats one that has aphrodisiac effects and tries to seduce Azusa, who then punishes her. Azusa realizes Beelzebub, the Lord of Flies, has been in the house disguised as a housefly the whole time. Azusa challenges her to a duel, during which Beelzebub flies into the barrier and passes out from shock. Azusa helps her recover, during which Beelzebub explains the Nutri-spirit did not make her sick. It actually gave her the energy to work all night, but she overworked herself and made herself sick. Beelzebub actually wants more Nutri-spirit. Azusa punishes Halkara for wasting her time. Halkara decides to move her Nutri-spirit factory to Flatta to keep living with Azusa. Beelzebub agrees to visit again to settle her duel against Azusa in a friendly manner, and to visit Falfa and Shalsha. Azusa decides she can handle her new family growing even larger, until Laika suddenly announces she is returning to her own home.
4	4	"We Went to a Dragon's Wedding"; Transliteration: "Doragon no Kekkonshiki ni Itta" (Japanese: ドラゴンの結婚式に行った)	Takahiro Ōkawa	Yutaka Yasunaga	May 1, 2021
Laika clarifies she is only leaving temporarily to attend her older sister Leila's wedding and they are all invited. Laika flies them to Mount Rokko, the volcanic home of the red dragons. Dragons from the enemy blue dragon clan crash the party led by Flatorte, a notorious bully who is jealous Laika's sister is getting married before her, and so will use their ice breath to completely freeze Mount Rokko. Azusa decides not to interfere in an inter-clan issue, but when a dragon endangers her daughters, she defeats the blue dragons and forces Flatorte to flee the wedding. At Mount Rokko's village, Azusa finds Beelzebub, there for a hot spring vacation, draining the rest of the blue dragon's magic. Laika forces the captured Flatorte to assume her human form and pay for the damages. Azusa also forces her to sign a peace treaty so she can never attack the red dragons again. At the wedding, Flatorte begrudgingly wishes Leila well as a married woman. Laika asks Azusa if she can treat her as a sister now that her own sister is married. Azusa is happy that Laika is now her younger sister, Beelzebub as her older sister, and Halkara as her troublesome apprentice.
5	5	"A Ghost Appeared"; Transliteration: "Yūrei ga Deta" (Japanese: 幽霊が出た)	Yasunori Gotō	Naohiro Fukushima	May 8, 2021
Halkara's new factory has a ghost, so she has been unable to hire workers. Azusa summons Beelzebub to help as she is scared of ghosts. Beelzebub forces the ghost to make itself visible, revealing she is a teenage girl called Rosalie who committed suicide centuries ago when her selfish parents sold her to be married to a cruel man. The factory used to be her family home and as a ghost, she is trapped in the place she died. Beelzebub reveals if she possesses a human to travel outside the building she will be freed, so Azusa offers Halkara as a convenient vessel, thrilling Rosalie. At Azusa's home, Rosalie realises she is stuck in Halkara's body, which Beelzebub explains could kill Halkara before long. Attempting to remove Rosalie proves difficult as she cannot be shaken out, exorcised out, or even scared out. Hoping putting Rosalie to sleep will help they get her drunk, allowing Halkara to regain her body, then Rosalie is sobered up by dunking Halkara in freezing water, causing Rosalie to jump out of Halkara's body. Revealing she can use magic, Rosalie dispels the rumours about ghosts by making herself useful to the villagers, allowing Halkara to begin hiring workers.
6	6	"Along Came a Leviathan"; Transliteration: "Rivaiasan ga Kita" (Japanese: リヴァイアサンが来た)	Kyōsuke Takada	Tatsuya Takahashi	May 15, 2021
Beelzebub announces Azusa will receive the Demon Medal of Honour for ending the war between the dragon clans, meaning they must visit the Demon Realm. Rosalie worries she will not be able to wear a nice dress since ghosts are permanently stuck in the outfit they died in. Since no spell exists to change a ghost's appearance, Azusa decides to create the spell herself and manages to successfully change Rosalie into a dress. Beelzebub arrives with a giant flying whale demon named Fatla to transport them to the Demon Realm. Fatla is so large she carries a luxury hotel on her back run by her sister Vania. After spending the night, they arrive at the demon capital city Vanzeld to meet the Demon King. The Demon King turns out to be a little girl, Provat Pecora Allieres, who is a fan of Azusa and Halkara's Nutri-Spirit drink. Halkara, not initially realizing Provat is Demon King, makes several rude remarks and has to grovel for forgiveness. Provat finds her funny and forgives her, only for Halkara to accidentally head-butt her while rising from her groveling position. With Provat unconscious, Halkara is arrested for attacking Demon Royalty and sentenced to death.
7	7	"We Beat Up a Demon King"; Transliteration: "Maō o Taoshichatta" (Japanese: 魔王を倒しちゃった)	Shinichi Omata	Tatsuya Takahashi	May 22, 2021
Azusa hatches a plan to wake Provat using a foul tasting potion. However, she had to fight Provat's subjects due to them not trusting her. Provat wakes up and accuses Azusa of trying to poison her, then challenges her to a duel. Azusa destroys Provat's sword, so Provat agrees to spare Halkara, but then admits she has been seeking someone stronger than her and declares Azusa is her big sister. Forced to agree, Azusa pretends to be a domineering big sister and forces Provat (now insisting on being called Pecora) to free Halkara after convincing her that her being knocked out was an accident. Pecora admits she has a “submission complex” and wants Azusa to boss her around. At the medal of honour ceremony, Pecora gives medals to Azusa and to Laika and Flatorte to celebrate the end of the dragon war. She also forces Flatorte to let Azusa touch her horns as a sign of peace. Flatorte reveals Azusa touching her horns means Azusa is now her master, so she must serve Azusa forever or commit suicide. Azusa realizes Pecora manipulated her into having to take Flatorte home with her, so she orders Flatorte to think and act for herself, freeing Flatorte from servitude through a loophole. Flatorte decides to live with her anyway and starts calling Azusa Mama, leading to sibling rivalry with Laika.
8	8	"A Fake Witch of the Highlands Appeared"; Transliteration: "Kōgen no Majo no Nisemono ga Deta" (Japanese: 高原の魔女の偽物が出た)	Ryūta Yamamoto	Naohiro Fukushima	May 29, 2021
Laika and Flatorte bicker constantly. Falfa and Shalsha believe they are grumpy from not having eaten fresh meat. Natalie from the guild brings news of a boar infestation, delighting Laika and Flatorte. Flatorte at first embarrasses herself by taking her clothes off due to them being a hindrance. After killing the boars, Beelzebub and Fatla arrive and organize a feast of boar meat. Laika and Flatorte admit they were bickering over taking turns sleeping next to Azusa, so Azusa lets them both sleep in her bed. Azusa soon realizes someone has been impersonating her. While gathering information they stumble into a pub that specializes in serving masochists and the owner offers to identify fake Azusa if they spend time abusing her customers, which Azusa and Laika discover they have a talent for. The fake is an old woman who tries to flee, but is caught and transforms into a young witch named Eno. Eno explains she is a medicine maker and wants to be famous, but at the same time, does not want too many people to recognize her. Azusa suggests she sell her medicines, but in character as an idol girl so she will be both famous and completely anonymous. Her medicine proves to be so popular she asks Azusa's advice on expanding her business, and Halkara even considers making her a business partner at her factory.
9	9	"My Daughter Turned Into a Slime and Couldn't Change Back"; Transliteration: "Musume ga Suraimu Kara Modorenaku Natta" (Japanese: 娘がスライムから戻れなくなった)	Ryūta Imaizumi; Yoshiyuki Kumeda	Yutaka Yasunaga	June 5, 2021
Falfa somehow turns into a Slime and cannot turn back. Beelzebub suggests they ask Intelligent-Slime, who lives in Pecora's castle. Intelligent-Slime does not know but points them to Magician-Slime atop a nearby mountain. Magician-Slime explains she was a slime, but used transformation magic to become human. She instantly diagnoses Falfa is in her “sleep form”, meaning she must have pulled a muscle in her sleep, making it too difficult to maintain a human form. As she did this on instinct, she must learn how to transform back and suggests asking Fighter-Slime (or Fightie for short), who gained her human form by studying martial arts. They locate Fightie at a fighting tournament, which Azusa and Beelzebub both enter. Beelzebub defeats Fightie, who helps Falfa turn back to human. Beelzebub demands Azusa fight her in the final to settle their old duel. Azusa refuses to lose while her daughters are watching and defeats Beelzebub again. Beelzebub later points out, having won the tournament, Azusa's fame will spread further and cause her even more problems. Fightie asks to become Azusa's student, but quickly reconsiders when she senses from Azusa's aura how many slimes she has killed, so she becomes the student of the reluctant Beelzebub instead.
10	10	"A Minstrel Came to Town"; Transliteration: "Gin'yū Shijin ga Kita" (Japanese: 吟遊詩人が来た)	Nanase Tomii	Yutaka Yasunaga	June 12, 2021
Schifanoia, a rabbit-girl musician, visits Flatta village, but her Death Music does not impress the villagers. She passes out from hunger, so Azusa takes her home where she reveals her real name is Kuku. She has been failing as a musician for sixty-three years and is now considering getting a real job. Azusa advises she continue if it makes her happy. Flatorte, a music fan, points out Death Music is not popular anymore, plus Kuku is not that talented. Azusa suggests changing her style and asks everyone to think of new lyrics. Laika sings about devotion to Azusa, Halkara a song promoting her nutri-drink, Falfa and Shalsha sing about grasshoppers, and Rosalie sings about the depression of being dead. Kuku decides to abandon her Schifanoia persona and write a song inspired by Azusa and her family. Beelzebub arrives, hears Kuku's new song and demands she perform at the demon music festival. Kuku suffers stage fright at the thought of such a large audience, but is helped through it by Flatorte, performing her song “Thank You” to massive applause. Her breakout performance leads to hundreds of offers to play at other concerts. Kuku thanks everyone for believing in her, especially Flatorte who tells her to keep playing whatever style makes her happy, no matter what.
11	11	"I Ate a Mushroom and Turned Into a Child"; Transliteration: "Kinoko o Tabete Kodomo ni Natta" (Japanese: キノコを食べて子供になった)	Atsushi Kashiwa	Tatsuya Takahashi	June 19, 2021
Halkara accidentally feeds Azusa a magical mushroom, turning Azusa into a child. Azusa is annoyed, but Laika and Flatorte are delighted. Azusa summons Beelzebub, who is unable to resist her cuteness, but agrees to take her to Pecora, who is also smitten with Azusa's cuteness, but directs her to a dungeon within a giant World Tree where an alchemist lives. Azusa expects a dangerous journey, but finds the tree has been turned into a 108 floor tourist attraction where the higher they travel, the more money the tickets cost. Navigating the tourist traps takes time and they stay overnight in a hot spring on floor 38, then the next night on floor 84. Reaching floor 108, the alchemist, a young girl, gives her the cure, pills made by Eno. Eno arrives and is surprised Azusa climbed the tree when wyverns could have flown her to the top, plus, the medicine is available in Eno's shop close to Azusa's home. Azusa returns to Pecora's castle and takes the pills, but forgets to change clothes first so when she grows her clothes tear and leave her naked, to Pecora's delight. Tired and dirty, Azusa insists everyone bathe together, including Pecora, who asks if she can grope Azusa's adult breasts, chasing her around the bathroom.
12	12	"We Opened a Coffee Shop"; Transliteration: "Kissaten o Hiraita" (Japanese: 喫茶店を開いた)	Nobukage Kimura	Naohiro Fukushima	June 26, 2021
The group visits Flatta which is preparing for the dance festival, a two-day event to celebrate the harvest. Azusa had previously distanced herself from past dance festivals, but having bonded with the others, wants to do something for the festival. During lunch at a cafe, Azusa gets inspiration from observing the strengths of others to run the coffee shop "The Witch's House" on the eve of the festival. In preparation for the festival, Azusa and the others try their waitress uniforms, prepare the menu, set up the coffee shop and distribute flyers to the Flatta townsfolk. On the eve of the festival, seeing the long queue to their coffee shop, Azusa opens the coffee shop one hour early and starts serving the customers with the others. As the coffee shop gets busier throughout the day, Beelzebub, Vania and Fatla and even Pecora pitch in to help, and Fightie, Eno, and Kuku also visit the coffee shop. With their help, Azusa and the others manage to serve all the customers and close up shop. Azusa thanks the others for making the coffee shop a success before they take a break while she reflects on the events of the series. The next day, with the others wanting to visit the dance festival, Azusa decides to take the group to the dance festival on the night. Azusa gets a knock on the door which she opens, greeting the person which starts her day.

==== Season 2 (2025) ====
No. overall	No. in season	Title	Directed by	Storyboarded by	Original release date
13	1	"Along Came a Goddess"; Transliteration: "Kamisama ga Kita" (Japanese: 神様が来た)	Toshiaki Kanbara	Naohiro Fukushima	April 5, 2025
Azusa recalls her past life, her death and reincarnation, and how she has gained a family. During breakfast, Azusa decides to gather mushrooms and travels to the edge of the forest where she, Laika, and Halkara discover rice and red bean crops. Returning home, she works with the others to create manju out of the discovered products and shows them to Falfa and Shalsha. After designing the manju to look like slimes, she and her family head to town to sell them. The sells are a success, and Halkara suggests collecting stamps for a stamp card belonging to a goddess named Mega-mega; Shalsha explains her history. While Azusa, Shalsha, and Halkara go to attend the goddess's convention, the others choose to stay home. At the convention, Azusa discovers that the goddess is the very same one who reincarnated her. After her speech, Mega-mega invites Azusa to see her. Azusa grows nervous about what the goddess will do to her, but upon meeting her, Azusa learns that Mega-mega has been demoted because reincarnating people as immortal young females is turning into a problem for the gods. Once back home, Azusa's family members all add votes to her stamp card, and she decides to make cards for everyone else too.
14	2	"We Searched for an Undead"; Transliteration: "Andeddo o Sōsaku Shita" (Japanese: アンデッドを捜索した)	Ryuta Yamamoto	Yutaka Yasunaga	April 12, 2025
After selling magic stones to the guild, Falfa and Shalsha receive a letter inviting them to an event called the World Spirit Summit. Only spirits are allowed to attend, meaning that the rest of Azusa's family cannot come, except for Azusa herself as Falfa and Shalsha are allowed to bring an accomplice. They travel to the lake where the event will occur, though they have to wait until night for the gathering to begin. As the event starts, Shalsha shares the dish that Azusa made before, which she and Falfa brought with them. After the event is over, the spirits leave and a woman named Yufufu, who is a droplet spirit, emerges from the lake and explains that the event used to take place on a summit, but the location was moved due to the spirits losing interest in it. She invites the three to her home and decides to become Azusa's adoptive mother, which Azusa accepts. The next morning, she discovers that, to her embarrassment, she ejaculated after embracing Yufufu. Returning home, she meets Vania, Fatla, Beelzebub, and Pecora, who heard about her new dish and Pecora shares the cookies she made with Azusa. They request for Azusa to help look for an undead that must be brought to the Demon Realm and she reluctantly agrees. After passing out flyers regarding the undead with Fightie's help, Azusa remembers a rumor that the spirits mentioned earlier and while following a woman delivering rotten food to the undead, they discover that the undead is a catgirl named Pondeli. Once the woman leaves, they get Pondeli to let them in and learn that she died from starvation as a result of her laziness, and she now watches over a graveyard. She does not want to go to the Demon Realm as she hates working, so Beelzebub challenges her to a card game and if she wins, Pondeli must obey her. Beelzebub loses, as Pondeli is very skilled at the card game; however, Beelzebub still needs Pondeli to move to the Demon Realm, so Azusa suggests having her set up a shop in the realm where she can challenge demons to her card games at a price. Pondeli agrees with the idea as she can make money and avoid work at the same time.
15	3	"We Went to Beelzebub's House"; Transliteration: "Beruzebubu no Ie ni Itta" (Japanese: ベルゼブブの家に行った)	Masakazu Takahashi	Shuji Kuzuhara	April 19, 2025
Pondeli is enjoying her new shop in the Demon Realm. At Vania and Fatla's suggestion, Azusa visits Beelzebub with them while invisible to see her working. Her presence is eventually discovered. Beelzebub invites the rest of Azusa's family over for a meal. Afterwards, she reluctantly allows them to come to her mansion. During a meal, they notice that the mansion has no maids. When Falfa and Shalsha want to explore, Beelzebub gives everyone a tour, but only lets them see a few rooms. Falfa and Shalsha also desire to see the second floor and despite Beelzebub's protests, they discover that Beelzebub only uses a small part of the mansion, neglecting the rest. She explains that she was born a commoner, so the mansion had a lot more rooms than she needed. Laika decides to clean the place up and challenges Flatorte. Upon learning that Falfa and Shalsha have gone out to the garden, they head outside, but discover that it is a marsh forest filled with deadly plants and monsters. During Azusa's search for her daughters, she sees a moving plant that runs away from her while Beelzebub manages to find the twins. They return to the mansion where Rosalie declares that Laika and Flatorte's competition has ended in a draw. Meanwhile, the moving plant is revealed to be a mandragora girl, who is frightened of witches.
16	4	"We Went Looking for a Mandragora"; Transliteration: "Mandoragora o Sagasu Koto ni Natta" (Japanese: マンドラゴラを探すことになった)	Ryuta Yamamoto	Shuji Kuzuhara	April 26, 2025
Azusa visits Eno's new shop along with Flatorte and Halkara. Eno gives her mandragora pills and explains the history of 300-year-old mandragoras; it turns out witches desire to catch 300-year-old mandragoras to turn them into valuable medicine. Azusa remembers the moving plant from before in Beelzebub's garden and realizes that it is the mandragora that Eno mentioned. In response, Eno closes up shop and leaves. Azusa's group go to inform Beelzebub, requesting her help to protect the mandragora. Eno arrives with all the witches in the land to hunt the mandragora in Beelzebub's private property, much to Azusa's dismay and Beelzebub's anger. Azusa's group attempt to find the mandragora before the others do, but discover that Eno has followed them, who then leads the other witches to their locations. After some loud convincing by Halkara, the terrified mandragora reveals herself to Azusa. Seeing the innocence of the mandragora, the witches cannot bring themselves to harm her, but the mandragora hands over one of her leaves to Eno so she can create the medicine as long as they leave her alone while Beelzebub charges the witches for wrecking her garden. Back in Beelzebub's house, the mandragora develops hostility towards Halkara due to her kind's habit of picking plants and Azusa invites her to come live with her. The group try to think of a name for the mandragora before Azusa gives her the name Sandra and brings her back home to introduce her to the rest of her family. Being a plant, Sandra only needs water and sunlight as a food source and prefers to sleep in the garden. She also gives everyone advice on gardening due to how bad the vegetables taste, providing them with a better meal. After the credits, it is revealed that Beelzebub made the witches work in her garden to pay for the damages.
17	5	"I Became Mama Yufufu's Daughter"; Transliteration: "Yufufu Mama no Musume ni Natta" (Japanese: ユフフママの娘になった)	Toshiaki Kanbara	Naohiro Fukushima	May 3, 2025
As Falfa and Shalsha teach Sandra how to write, Azusa sees Sandra as a third daughter, though the latter denies it. While doing laundry, Shalsha requests for Azusa to have her, Falfa, and Sandra attend school. Azusa enrolls them in Senale Elementary Academy and watches them while invisible. Due to Falfa's gifted knowledge, she is able to finish the lessons rather quickly. While playing dodgeball, Shalsha's strength makes it hard for the other kids to keep up and Sandra ducks underground to avoid being hit by the ball, amazing her classmates. After a few days, Azusa informs Yufufu of what occurred in school: Falfa and Shalsha have graduated early, and Sandra will only interact with them and Azusa. During a meal, Azusa is turned into a child again after eating a familiar-looking mushroom. Yufufu, seeing that Azusa does not understand her daughters' way of life, decides to have her experience what it is like to be in their shoes. Azusa brings Sandra over to give her the same experience. While shopping, some thugs capture Azusa and Sandra after Yufufu leaves them for a brief moment, intending to ransom them. Arriving at their hideout, Azusa reveals her true colors and defeats the thugs with ease. A thug then takes Sandra hostage to force Azusa to surrender, but Yufufu saves them at the last second. After the thugs are arrested, Azusa and Sandra finally understand how it feels to be young. The next morning, Azusa is turned back into an adult and Sandra decides to learn from home rather than go back to school, as she enjoys Azusa, Falfa, and Shalsha's company.
18	6	"Laika Entered a Martial Arts Tournament"; Transliteration: "Raika ga Bujutsu Taikai ni Deta" (Japanese: ライカが武術大会に出た)	Yusuke Onoda	Naohiro Fukushima	May 10, 2025
As Laika does laundry, she recalls her first meeting with Azusa. Fightie arrives and practices combat training with Laika to prepare for a martial arts tournament. However, Fightie injures her back and turns back into her slime form. As a result, she cannot enter the tournament by herself in this state, so Laika decides to accompany her as a slime-mancer. They easily win the first round, with Azusa being impressed that Fightie can still fight even while in slime form. After winning more rounds, they face off against a knight named Domremy. Fightie manages to defeat him by attacking him from the inside of his armor. Having won the prize money, Fightie leaves to fulfill her dream of being a martial artist. Having been staring at the nearby mountains for some time, Flatorte reveals that her homeland is close to their location and takes Azusa there for a visit, though she worries how her kind will react to her return since blue dragons mostly care for power; Laika also accompanies them. Arriving, they find the place is in a snowy area. They also meet Flatorte's parents along with the other blue dragons, who are all interested in challenging Azusa; Flatorte warns her that they may come to her house to challenge her if she declines. The dragons are one by one easily defeated, but Laika also wants to fight Azusa to show off her training. She too loses the fight. Afterwards, while heading home, Azusa is glad that the blue dragons accepted her. Later, Laika and Flatorte challenge each other to a game of ping-pong.
19	7	"I Met a Pine Spirit"; Transliteration: "Matsu no Seirei ni Atta" (Japanese: 松の精霊に会った)	Atsushi Tanizawa	Yutaka Yasunaga	May 17, 2025
Natalie suggests that Azusa should get married, which Azusa rejects. Natalie then tells Azusa that there's a matchmaking party in a town called Tazine, which is falling into disarray and can only be resolved if a marriage ceremony occurs. Natalie also plans to accompany Azusa there and suggests that she should bring Halkara and Flatorte too, even though they are also uninterested in marriage. Arriving in Tazine, they find the place empty. The men at the party are not as attractive as Natalie thought before the group visit a temple owned by Misjantie, a spirit who blesses marriage. A woman appears nearby and reveals that she is Misjantie herself, who is upset because her business is declining due to people moving away. Natalie requests her to help find her a husband, but she cannot do so; however, she urges them to help save her temple, which will fall if a marriage ceremony does not take place. Azusa, Halkara, and Flatorte still do not want to marry, so Misjantie proposes another idea: to have Falfa and Shalsha marry each other instead. After learning of this, Beelzebub agrees with the idea since the marriage is not a real one. The people that Azusa met before all arrive to attend the wedding. The ceremony begins with Falfa and Shalsha wearing tuxedos and are given rings. Azusa is assigned to help with the next part, which now involves her daughters wearing wedding dresses. After giving heartful speeches, they both kiss Azusa. Back home, Azusa and her daughters plant a pine tree that Misjantie gave them, which grows to full size in three days. Sandra is not impressed with the new tree, but they discover that Misjantie made a small-sized temple onto the tree to have more marriage ceremonies at Azusa's house. Azusa does not like this idea, so Misjantie moves her temple (now normal-sized) to the village. After the credits, Natalie visits the new temple to pray for a husband, with little success.
20	8	"We Went Swimming in the Sea"; Transliteration: "Kaisuiyoku ni Itta" (Japanese: 海水浴に行った)	Ryuta Yamamoto	Yutaka Yasunaga	May 24, 2025
To stay warm from the cold weather, Azusa and her family decide to visit a beach, but they discover that there are jellyfish in the water. They meet Curalina, who is a traveling artist and a jellyfish spirit; they find her art to be quite creepy. She helps them get rid of the jellyfish by convincing the wave spirit, allowing them to enjoy the beach. In return, they agree to serve as models for her paintings. She also demonstrates one final ability by making the jellyfish glow. After a few days, the family all visit Curalina's house to see her art collection, accompanied by Vania, Fatla, Beelzebub, Fightie, and Pecora. They find the portraits of them to be quite unsettling during their time at the beach. Beelzebub examines a painting of some pyramids and reveals that it is actually a kingdom inhabited by ghosts. Despite her fear of evil spirits, Azusa decides to go there along with Rosalie, Beelzebub, Fightie, and Pecora, while convincing the rest of her family to remain behind for their own safety. After defeating some monsters and removing a barrier with Pecora's help, they reach the pyramids, but encounter ghostly women who reveal themselves after Rosalie convinces them that they mean no harm. A ghost girl among them introduces herself as Nahna Nahna, maid and minister of Muum Muum, the kingdom's ruler. She reveals that after a plague struck the kingdom, killing the inhabitants, Muum Muum locked herself in her chambers and refuses to come out because she thinks her people are boring. The group agree to help get Muum Muum to come out and proceed to face challenges to reach Muum Muum's chamber.
21	9	"We Met the Evil Spirit Queen"; Transliteration: "Akuryō no Heika to Atta" (Japanese: 悪霊の陛下と会った)	Toshiaki Kanbara	Shuji Kuzuhara	May 31, 2025
While entering the chamber, Rosalie wonders if she will get along with Muum Muum considering how her status is different from hers before the others give her some encouragement. A golem attacks them, but Azusa manages to defeat it, only for more golems to appear. After defeating them, they notice that the golems are made of sand tainted with magic. They also find bread that is also created by magic. After fighting more monsters and overcoming many traps in the chamber, they encounter a three-headed dog, which digitally disappears after Azusa touches it. It turns out the dungeon they are in is an incomplete game that Muum Muum is working on. Fightie discovers a secret passage in the wall. They find themselves in a control room where Muum Muum is working on the dungeon's construction. She is disappointed that she did not manage to finish the dungeon in time. After Rosalie explains the situation outside, Muum Muum reveals that she does not enjoy being queen because she cannot make friends. Rosalie decides to become Muum Muum's friend in response and Muum Muum insists that she is to be called Muu from now on. As a result, the ghost kingdom forms an alliance with the demon kingdom. Sometime later, Azusa receives a delivery, which is a special fertilizer that Sandra takes a liking to. Upon testing the fertilizer on Sandra, it causes her to grow into an adult as well as developing a change in her personality. She heads into town with Azusa, Flatorte, and Halkara to pick out new clothes. Sandra also falls in love with a tree and gifts Azusa with a bouquet of flowers, who hugs her in response. The next day, Sandra returns to normal, but she decides to use the fertilizer again on special occasions.
22	10	"We Went to the Demon King's Birthday Party"; Transliteration: "Maō no o Tanjōe ni Itta" (Japanese: 魔王のお誕生会に行った)	Yusuke Onoda	Naohiro Fukushima	June 7, 2025
One night, Pecora reads a book about foxes. While Azusa and her family are doing chores, Pecora arrives for a visit and give everyone presents. She also announces that her birthday is coming up and only wants Azusa to attend. The party takes place in a theater where Pecora performs in front of a large audience while Azusa watches from a private seat. Pecora then brings Beelzebub to perform with her, though the latter reveals that she was forced to take part in it as she was against the idea at first. The party takes place in Pecora's throne room, and Azusa is taken to a private area to have a meal with her. After eating a magical mushroom, Azusa turns into a fox-girl, which will wear off in five days, meaning that she has to stay with Pecora until then as part of her wish since Azusa does not want her family seeing her new form. However, Azusa's new form causes her to develop an uncontrollable craving for a dish called abura-age and begins madly searching the castle for it. The demon soldiers and mages unsuccessfully try to stop her rampage. Beelzebub eventually manages to stop her by giving her the dish that she craves. She then scolds Pecora for transforming Azusa into a fox-girl, but decides to spend the night sleeping on her tail with Pecora, Fatla, and Vania as she too finds her cute.
23	11	"I Battled a Traditional Goddess"; Transliteration: "Dentō Aru Kamisama to Tatakatta" (Japanese: 伝統ある神様と戦った)	Atsushi Tanizawa	Yutaka Yasunaga	June 14, 2025
Azusa, who is now finally back to normal, returns home from shopping with Laika. They come across Misjantie, who is upset that another temple that is bigger than hers is being built for Mega-mega nearby. Returning to Azusa's house, they discover that the goddess herself is there. Instead of lashing out at Mega-mega, Misjantie reveals that she actually idolizes her and the two agree to get along. A week later, Mega-mega returns and reveals that she has a rival: Nintan, who is not a very friendly goddess. Shalsha reveals the location of her temple and Azusa reluctantly agrees to go with Mega-mega to help get back at Nintan for mocking her virtue stamp cards despite learning how dangerous Nintan can be. At Nintan’s temple, they enter a hidden portal that takes them to Nintan's dimension. Mega-mega attempts to reason with Nintan using friendly methods, but she is unswayed. As a last resort, she challenges Nintan to a fight, but loses and is transformed into a frog, though she can still speak. Azusa comes to her defense and Mega-mega gives her a special virtue stamp card that upgrades Azusa's powers, allowing her to match Nintan's strength. Nintan eventually admits defeat after some persuasion by Azusa and is now on good terms with her. Azusa is also able to convince Nintan to accept Mega-mega’s wishes, though she still holds on to her anger towards Mega-mega. Upon returning to the temple, Azusa realizes that they forgot to ask Nintan to turn Mega-mega back to normal. After the credits, Mega-mega is shown to have been returned to normal sometime after during a conversation with Nintan.
24	12	"We Opened the Coffee Shop Again This Year"; Transliteration: "Kotoshi mo Kissaten o Hiraita" (Japanese: 今年も喫茶店を開いた)	Toshiaki Kanbara	Kunihisa Sugishima	June 21, 2025
As the festival season begins, Azusa decides to reopen her coffee shop. Since the villagers like the shop so much, they consider keeping it running all the time despite the risk of having too many customers to handle; they decide ask Azusa’s friends to help them. Misjantie, having been overhearing this, decides to help run the shop with Natalie's support. The shop opens a couple of days later. Laika feels uncomfortable wearing her maid's uniform again and Sandra chooses to not be involved. Beezlebub, Pecora, Fatla, and Vania are the first customers to arrive, followed by Fightie, Muu, Nahna Nahna, Yufufu, Mega-mega, and Nintan. Azusa eventually convinces Sandra to help and gives her a uniform of her own. After the shop closes at the end of the day, Misjantie is eager to open her own coffee shop while Pecora arranges a surprise for Azusa for tomorrow. The next day, the festival begins and Azusa's group pass by some stalls run by demons. They also meet Eno, Pondeli, and Curalina, who are running attractions of their own. They then find Pecora performing onstage with Kuku. After her performance, she invites Azusa to the stage to sing. During this time, flashbacks of the characters that Azusa befriended are shown. Once Azusa finishes, she receives a thunderous applause.

== Reception ==
The light novel ranked ninth in 2019 in Takarajimasha's annual light novel guide book Kono Light Novel ga Sugoi! in the tankōbon category.
