= Infini-T Force =

Japanese 3DCG anime series

インフィニティーフォース (Infinitī Fōsu)
- Created by: Tatsunoko Production
- Manga

Infini-T Force: Arc to the Future
- Written by: Ukyō Kodachi
- Illustrated by: Tatsuma Ejiri
- Published by: Hero's Inc.
- English publisher: NA: Mad Cave Studios
- Magazine: Monthly Hero's
- Original run: October 31, 2015 – December 25, 2020
- Volumes: 10
- Anime television series
- Directed by: Kiyotaka Suzuki
- Written by: Toshiya Ono
- Music by: Yutaka Yamada
- Studio: Tatsunoko Production; Digital Frontier
- Licensed by: NA: Viz Media; SEA: Medialink
- Original network: ytv, Nippon TV, FBS, STV, HTV, MMT, SDT, Chūkyo TV
- English network: SEA: Animax Asia
- Original run: October 3, 2017 – December 26, 2017
- Episodes: 12
- Anime film

Gekijōban Infini-T Force: Gatchaman Saraba Tomo yo
- Directed by: Jun Matsumoto
- Written by: Jun Kumagai
- Music by: Yutaka Yamada
- Studio: Tatsunoko Production; Digital Frontier
- Licensed by: NA: Viz Media
- Released: February 24, 2018
- Runtime: 90 minutes

Infini-T Force (インフィニティーフォース, Infinitī Fōsu) is a Japanese 3DCG anime series featuring a crossover between characters from Science Ninja Team Gatchaman, Casshan, Hurricane Polymar and Tekkaman: The Space Knight, all series produced by Tatsunoko Production in the 1970s. The new series is a co-production between Tatsunoko and Digital Frontier and aired from October 3 to December 26, 2017.

== Plot ==
Emi is a seventeen-year-old girl living in Shibuya, Tokyo. Her father is always away with work and she's grown listless. Suddenly, a twist of fate involving a certain magical item changes everything. A mysterious pencil, of all things, is linked to the appearance of heroes from another world! Could this be the start to the excitement she's so desperately craving, or is there something more?

== Characters ==
Ken Washio (鷲尾健, Washio Ken)
Voiced by: Tomokazu Seki (Japanese); Johnny Yong Bosch (English)
24-year-old Ken is the oldest of the four heroes and acts as their leader. He usually reprimands Emi when she misbehaves and is determined to save her, while restoring the worlds Z destroyed. He has the power of transforming into Gatchaman G-01. During his first encounter with Z, he manages to make him drop the Case, which ends up in Emi's hands.
Jouji Minami (南城二)
Voiced by: Takahiro Sakurai (Japanese); Kyle McCarley (English)
22-year-old Jouji is an astronaut looking for a new planet for his people to settle in his original world. He fights as Tekkaman using the "Tekset" armor armed with a double-bladed lance.
Takeshi Yoroi (鎧武士)
Voiced by: Kenichi Suzumura (Japanese); Nicolas Roye (English)
20-year-old Takeshi is a former agent with the ability to transform himself into Hurricane Polymar using a special polymer that gives him special powers. After his world is destroyed by Z, he lives for one year as a detective in Shibuya until he meets Emi and the other heroes.
Tetsuya Azuma (東鉄也)
Voiced by: Sōma Saitō (Japanese); Landon McDonald (English)
17-year-old Tetsuya is the youngest of the four heroes. In his world, Tetsuya was transformed into an android called "Casshan" by his father to fight other androids who threaten human race, after his world is destroyed, he meets the other heroes and Emi, joining them with his pet companion, the robotic dog Friender (フレンダー, Furendā).
Emi Kaidou (界堂笑)
Voiced by: Ai Kayano (Japanese); Cassandra Morris (English)
The main protagonist. Emi is an aloof 17-year-old girl who lives alone in her house since her father has left for unexplained reasons. When meeting the four heroes, she comes across an artifact known as "Case", that has the power of making wishes come true. In her hands, the Case takes the form of a large pencil, reflecting her desire to draw. She is later revealed to be Z's daughter.
Z (ゼット)
Voiced by: Atsushi Ono (Japanese); Keith Silverstein (English)
Emi's father and the main antagonist, Kazumichi Kaido is a man who takes possession of the Case and under the alias of Z, destroys other worlds to fulfill his wish of protecting Emi. His research leads him to discover that in all parallel worlds, Emi is destined to have a tragic death in front of his eyes, so he sealed her in a closed world to protect her. In his hands, the Case takes the form of a small sun, reflecting a memory of his past when he watched the sunset with his daughter.
Raja Kaan (ラジャ・カーン)
Voiced by: Hiroki Yasumoto
Damian Grey (ダミアン・グレイ)
Voiced by: Daisuke Hirakawa (Japanese); Xander Mobus (English)
Damian Grey is a mysterious, flamboyant man who approaches Takeshi and hires his services to track down the Case. He then reveals himself to be a dangerous monster who intends to take the Case for himself in order to become the perfect evil.
Belle Lynn (ベル・リン)
Voiced by: Kana Hanazawa (Japanese); Julie Ann Taylor (English)
A woman from a dying race of inhumans who seeks strong genes to revive her people. She joins forces with Z, intending to take his genes, until she discovers that he is not human anymore, and attacks Emi instead.

== Media ==
=== Anime ===
The anime was announced on March 26, 2016. It was inspired by the manga of the same name, but follows an original story. Kiyotaka Suzuki directed the series, while Toshiya Ono supervised scripts. Oh! great designed the original character concepts, Koji Nakakita handled the suit and mechanical designs, and Keiichi Sato designed the original hero concepts. The anime aired as part of NTV's AnichU one-hour programming block. The opening theme is "To be continued ... " performed by Flumpool and the ending theme is "Tick-Tock" performed by Edda. Viz Media announced during Anime Weekend Atlanta that they have licensed both the anime series and the film. It is being streamed on Tubi TV.

No.	Title	Original release date
1	"Isolated Flower"	October 3, 2017
2	"Immediate Family"	October 10, 2017
3	"Intelligent Fury"	October 17, 2017
4	"Imaginary Friend"	October 24, 2017
5	"Invincible Future"	October 31, 2017
6	"Infini-T Force"	November 7, 2017
7	"Insane Father"	November 14, 2017
8	"Inner Frustration"	November 21, 2017
9	"In Flux"	November 28, 2017
10	"Ignition Flame"	December 5, 2017
11	"Independent Flower"	December 19, 2017
12	"I'll Find"	December 26, 2017

=== Manga ===
The manga was serialized in Hero's Inc.'s Monthly Hero's magazine from October 31, 2015, to December 25, 2020. It was written by Ukyō Kodachi and illustrated by Tatsuma Ejiri. Udon Entertainment announced during their Anime Expo 2017 panel that they have licensed the manga. At Anime NYC 2024, Mad Cave Studios announced that they licensed the manga for publication under their Nakama Press imprint.

No.	Original release date	Original ISBN	English release date	English ISBN
1	April 5, 2016	978-4-86468-454-5	September 26, 2017	978-1-77-294050-3
2	October 5, 2016	978-4-86468-475-0	March 13, 2018	978-17-7294051-0
3	April 5, 2017	978-4-86468-496-5	October 30, 2018	978-1-77-294063-3
4	October 5, 2017	978-4-86468-520-7	December 25, 2018	978-1-77-294087-9
5	February 5, 2018	978-4-86468-540-5	—	—
6	October 5, 2018	978-4-86468-592-4	—	—
7	April 5, 2019	978-4-86468-634-1	—	—
8	November 5, 2019	978-4-86468-676-1	—	—
9	May 15, 2020	978-4-86468-720-1	—	—
10	February 5, 2021	978-4-86468-766-9	—	—

=== Film ===
A theatrical film, Infini-T Force the Movie: Gatchaman - Farewell My Friend (劇場版 Infini-T Force/ガッチャマン さらば友よ, Infini-T Force Movie: Gatchaman - Saraba Tomo yo), was released on February 24, 2018. It is distributed by Shochiku and Square Enix. The cast of the TV series reprises their roles, with the addition of Kazuma Suzuki as Joe Asakura / Gatchaman G-02 of Science Ninja Team Gatchaman. Viz Media released the film on Blu-ray in the U.S. on January 5, 2021.
