= Tatsuma Ejiri =

Japanese manga artist

Tatsuma Ejiri 江尻立真
- Born: June 18, 1975 (age 51) Tanabe, Kyoto Prefecture
- Area: Manga artist
- Notable works: P2! -let's Play Pingpong!-

Tatsuma Ejiri (江尻立真, Ejiri Tatsuma) is a Japanese manga artist from Kyoto Prefecture. After graduating from Kanazawa University he worked as a manga assistant for, among others, Eiichiro Oda and Jin Kobayashi. His first professionally published work was CHILDS published in the 1999 winter edition of Akamaru Jump. In 2006 his sports manga P2! -let's Play Pingpong!- was serialized in Weekly Shonen Jump. His latest work is Infini-T Force, which celebrates Tatsunoko Productions' 55th anniversary and has been licensed in English by Udon Entertainment.

== Works ==
- CHILDS (1999, Shueisha)
- Oasis Dancer (2000, Shueisha)
- World 4U (2003–2006, Shueisha) – string of one-shots published between 2003 and 2014. Serialized in 'Jump Plus' (2014–2015)
- P2! -let's Play Pingpong!- (2006–2007 Shueisha)
- Papa no Iu Koto o Kikinasai! – Sorairo no Hibiki (2011-ongoing, Shueisha) (illustrator)
- Ojarumaru (2012–2014, Shueisha) -adaptation of the anime based on the original work of Rin Inumaru.
- Infini-T Force: Arc to the Future (Infini-T Force 未来の描線, Infini-T Force – Mirai no Byōsen) (2015–present), Shogakukan (illustrator).
- Mobile Suits Gundam Red Giant 03rd MS Team (2023–ongoing, Kadokawa Shoten).
