= Jinpachi =

- Gender: Male

Origin
- Origin: Japanese
- Meaning: Different meanings depending on the kanji used

Jinpachi (written: 甚八) is a masculine Japanese given name. Notable people with the name include:

- Jinpachi Nezu (根津 甚八; born 1947), Japanese actor

== Fictional characters ==
- Jinpachi Arashiyama (嵐山 甚八), in Nanaka 6/17
- Jinpachi Kogure (木暮 塵八), in Young Gun Carnaval
- Jinpachi Mishima (三島 仁八), in Tekken
- Jinpachi Ogura (小椋 迅八), in Please Save My Earth
- Jinpachi Munashi (無梨 甚八), in Naruto
