= List of Sket Dance episodes =

Box art of the first DVD Compilation released in Japan on August 28, 2011

Sket Dance is an anime series adapted from the manga series of the same name by Kenta Shinohara. Sket Dance follows the adventures of the Sket-dan, a high school club dedicated towards helping the students and teachers of Kaimei High School with their problems, as they do whatever it takes to help make their campus a better place. The anime was directed by Keiichiro Kawaguchi, and produced by Tatsunoko Production. It premiered on April 7, 2011, on TV Tokyo.

On March 30, 2011, Crunchyroll announced that they would simulcast the series. Episodes are available to premium users world-wide every Thursday at 3 AM Pacific Standard Time (PST), 30 minutes after the episode airs in Japan. Free users are able to view the episodes one week after their launch.

The anime adaptation ran for two seasons and officially ended on September 27, 2012, airing a total of 77 episodes.

Episodes from the series have been published in DVD. The first DVD compilation was released on August 28, 2011, with individual volumes being released monthly. As of May 24, 2013, 26 individual volumes have been released.

On September 24, 2021, in commemoration of the anime's 10th anniversary, it was announced that the anime will have a Blu-ray box set re-release titled "Sket Dance Memorial Complete Blu-ray", set to be released on December 24, 2021. It will include all seventy-seven episodes and the 2013 OVA.

On October 15, 2021, the first 25 episodes became available for streaming in Japan on Amazon Prime Video. Episodes 26 to 51 will be made available on November 15, and episodes 52 to 77 will be made available on December 15.

== Episode list ==
=== Season 1 (2011-2012) ===
No.	Title	Original release date
1	"The Academy SKETs"; Transliteration: "Gakuen no Suketto Tachi" (Japanese: 学園のSKET達)	April 7, 2011
A transfer student arrives on campus, and the three members of the Sket Dan introduce themselves, hoping the new student will join, but he politely declines. He returns soon after, covered in red paint as the apparent victim of bullying, asking the group for help. After investigating, they discover the culprit is actually the transfer student himself, who was operating under duress from the school bully and childhood acquaintance. After setting things straight, the new student is able to fit in comfortably at the school, and the members of Sket Dan look forward to their next task.
2	"Peppermint Samurai"; Transliteration: "Pepāminto Zamurai" (Japanese: ペパーミント侍)	April 14, 2011
The next person to request the aid of the Sket Dan is a "self-proclaimed" samurai of the Kendo Club. In the end, the sket dan helps him win the tournament. The client in this episode is viewed like an idiot who claims that he is a samurai.
3	"The Legendary Onihime"; Transliteration: "Densetsu no Onihime" (Japanese: 伝説の鬼姫)	April 21, 2011
Himeko was once a delinquent feared far and wide, the legendary yankee Onihime. She's totally reformed now, but starts to hear odd rumors that "the Onihime has started going on a rampage again."
4	"Romantic! Finding the Hilltop Pelolin!"; Transliteration: "Romantikku Zaka no Ue no Faindingu Perorin" (Japanese: ロマンティック坂の上のファインディングペロリン)	April 28, 2011
Saotome Roman, member of the Manga Club, runs into her "prince" on a hill road on her way back from school in the rain. In order to meet her prince once again, Roman comes to the Sket-dan to ask their help, but...
5	"The Ghost of the Incinerator"; Transliteration: "Shōkyakuro no Yūrei" (Japanese: 焼却炉の幽霊)	May 4, 2011
Yuuki Reiko, member of the Occult Club, barges into the Sket-dan's room holding a picture of one of Kaimei Academy's seven mysteries, the "Ghost of the Incinerator". The Sket-dan are on the case (mainly Switch), trying to find out the truth behind the picture, and getting Shimada Takako from the Newspaper Club mixed up in it, too...
6	"Even Onihime Has Tears in Her Eyes (Devil Princess May Cry)"; Transliteration: "Onihime no Me ni mo Namida" (Japanese: 鬼姫の目にも涙)	May 12, 2011
Tsubaki from the Student Council tells the Sket-dan they're going to be disbanded. In order to prove the Sket-dan's effectiveness, Bossun takes on a request to put on a play for a local preschool. But the Student Council also takes on the same request, and the battle is on!
7	"Summer Sakura"; Transliteration: "Natsu no Sakura" (Japanese: 夏の桜)	May 19, 2011
Tetsu comes and asks the Sket-dan to meet with someone in his place. It seems like a sickly girl who he was exchanging messages with under a false persona wants to come see him...
8	"Nervous & Genesis"; Transliteration: "Nābasu Ando Jeneshisu" (Japanese: ナーバス&ジェネシス)	May 26, 2011
Momoka has come to the Sket-dan for help. It turns out that she's been asked to audition for a voice role in an anime after being discovered during her performance at the preschool puppet show. Switch leaps at the opportunity to start her harsh training in the way of anime!
9	"Enta'll Do It!"; Transliteration: "Enta Yarimasu!" (Japanese: 円太やります!)	June 2, 2011
Manga artist Hinohara Enta has come to interview students at Kaimei Academy. Bossun thinks he can get popular if he becomes the model for the main character of a manga, but everything he says ends up being way too "boring" and "plain". Then, something completely out-of-the-blue happens!
10	"You Mustn't Watch"; Transliteration: "Mite wa Ikenai" (Japanese: 見てはいけない)	June 9, 2011
The Sket-dan is having fun trying to take their minds off the upcoming midterms, when they hear rumors of a mysterious DVD that will curse you with bad luck if you watch it. Just then, Kuramoto Ayumi comes in with a simple request, to help cheer up her friend who has been acting strange lately. But there's more to this than meets the eye, as the stoic Yagi is acting like someone who has seen something they shouldn't have...
11	"Real-deal Bibage Battle!"; Transliteration: "Gachinko Bibagē Batoru" (Japanese: ガチンコ・ビバゲー・バトル)	June 16, 2011
Yabasawa-san really wants a certain part for her avatar, and asks the Sket-dan to join a game tournament put on by a cellphone game site. The Sket-dan isn't particularly enthused about the prospect, but when they find out that the Student Council will also be participating...
12	"Shooting Gang Star Etc..."; Transliteration: "Shūtingu Gyangusutā Hoka" (Japanese: シューティングギャングスター他)	June 23, 2011
The second game of the Bibage Battle is a real show between Shinzou and Tsubaki, coming to a truly cinematic finish! Then the curtain rises on a sharp-shooting (or is it, sharp-tongued) battle between Switch and Daisey!
13	"Pixie's Garden"; Transliteration: "Pikushī Gāden" (Japanese: ピクシーガーデン)	June 30, 2011
In the first Arc finale, It's the second to last round, and it's a battle of love between the pitch perfect rich girl and the klutzy, head-in-the-clouds Roman-tic! Which one of the will break their team's hearts?
14	"Producing Uchida"; Transliteration: "Uchida o Purodyūsu" (Japanese: 内田をプロデュース)	July 7, 2011
Uchida Takaaki comes to the Sket Dance with a simple request: make him popular! Bossun and company immediately set their sights on getting Uchida to win a Mr. Popularity contest in their class, but Uchida's shy personality makes it difficult for him to stand out. Can Sket-dan Productions mold him into a star in just one week?!
15	"Mistaken Angel the 13th" Transliteration: "Jū San Nichi no Ayamachi no Enjeru" (Japanese: 13日の過ちのエンジェル)	July 14, 2011
Bossun may have a way with words, but these clients were born with their feet in their mouths! First is J-son-sensei, the shop teacher with the glass heart and looks straight out of some horror movie! Can the Sket-dan help him find love? A man of few words and many offstandish poses, "Dante" perhaps poses the greatest riddle of all. Can the Sket-dan help this Fallen Angel find his Wings
16	"Kaimei Rock Festival"; Transliteration: "Kaimei Rokku Fesutibaru" (Japanese: カイメイ・ロック・フェスティバル)	July 21, 2011
Kaimei Academy's music festival is coming up! Bossun is bummed that Himeko and Switch each have joined up with bands to participate. But before long Bossun is invited to join a band and the three are set to compete against each other.
17	"Sketchbook"; Transliteration: "Suketchibukku" (Japanese: スケッチブック)	July 28, 2011
Bossun makes friends with a violinist while practicing for the upcoming Rock Festival, Sugisaki Ayano. He learns from her how fun music is, and in no time the curtain rises on the Kaimei Rock Festival.
18	"This is How a Man Plays Hyperion"; Transliteration: "Sore ga Otoko no Hyuperion" (Japanese: それが男のヒュペリオン)	August 4, 2011
Yamanobe-sensei is back, and now he's trying to get everyone in the Sket-dan to play a nutty board game called Hyperion. Everyone except for Himeko, as only men can appreciate this game, supposedly. But the epicness gets Bossun and Switch very enthused about the game, and soon they find themselves heading to the world tournament...
19	"Panic and 100 Haircuts in the Principal's Office and Club Room"; Transliteration: "Kurabu Rūmu to Kōchōshitsu de Panikku in Kami o Kiru Hyaku no Hōhō" (Japanese: クラブルームと校長室でパニック・イン・髪を切る100の方法)	August 11, 2011
A writer for a local newspaper is coming to interview and take a photo of the Sket-dan, and Himeko demands that Bossun get his hair cut. But when Bossun refuses, Himeko takes things into her own hands... What could possibly go wrong? Afterwards, it's the principal's birthday, and the Student Council is planning a surprise party for him. But when the President makes a mess of his prized bronze bust, the principal will be in for a whole different kind of surprise...
20	"Group Blind Date Tsukkomi"; Transliteration: "Gōkon de Tsukkonde" (Japanese: 合コンでツッコんで)	August 18, 2011
Bossun and Himeko get into a little fight, and things are made worse when Bossun and Switch are invited to a mixer with Seiji and three other girls. Bossun is rarin' to impress with his comedic flair, but he's in for a tough crowd. Without Himeko's fiery comebacks, Bossun's humor falls flat...
21	"Otaku & Occult"; Transliteration: "Otaku to Okaruto" (Japanese: オタクトオカルト)	August 25, 2011
Bossun bumps into Himeko outside on the weekend, and they happen to spot Switch and Yuuki meeting up nearby as well. Their curiosity piqued, they decide to trail the 'odd couple' into a shopping mall. Turns out Switch is helping Yuuki with a request- to choose and purchase a laptop, so she can create a website dedicated to her passion of all things occult. Hijinks ensue, with the embodiment of 'Otaku' and 'Occult' clashing their interests and respective positions(supernatural vs science) against each other all the way(in their usual fashion). Nonetheless, they seem to be getting along well(again, in their own way), and even Bossun and Himeko note how unusual it is for Switch to be going out of his way to help his 'archrival', Yuuki. Switch and Yuuki then bump into her old crush from middle school, Kobayashi, who was there with another girl. He talks down to Yuuki, which seems to rub Switch the wrong way. After he leaves, Yuuki confides to Switch her past in her middle school: she was melancholic and had few friends, but wanted to try falling in love. She started having feelings for Kobayashi who was rather popular with the girls, but he turned her down citing her scary appearance. After hearing the story, Switch decides to bring her around the mall to do a total makeover for her. Later, after being abandoned by the girl he was with, Kobayashi spots a beautiful girl standing alone by a fountain outside, and hits on her. This turns out to be post-makeover Yuuki, however, and together with Switch, she finally turns the tables on him. On the way home, they bond over the incident, with Switch still denying any romantic interest in her. However, she notes, he will go with her again the next day to shop for the laptop. At the end of the episode is an omake bit, "Resort Dance", which has the girls at the beach playing the Japanese word game Shiritori.
22	"In the Park Homerun (Revised)"; Transliteration: "Ran'ningu Hōmuran (Kai)" (Japanese: ランニングホームラン(改))	September 1, 2011
The principal adores his grandson very much and asks the Sket-dan to prepare a picture play to entertain him. They decide to base the story on Momotaro, but change things from the usual. Afterwards, he asks them to play with his grandson for an afternoon, but the kid doesn't seem interested in having fun at all.
23	"It Feels Great to Be a Little Princess!"; Transliteration: "Ritoru Purinsesu wa Kibun Jōjō" (Japanese: リトルプリンセスは気分上々)	September 8, 2011
Momoka comes to the Sket-dan to ask for help in her voice acting job. In an upcoming episode, she needs to play Liberty Maji back when she was little, and Momoka is having a hard time grasping the mindset of a child for her acting. The Sket-dan try to help by playing children's games with her, but it isn't until she and Himeko accidentally drink one of Chuu-san's drugs that they can really experience their childhood all over again.
24	"Older Brother, Younger Brother"; Transliteration: "Ani Otōto" (Japanese: 兄・弟)	September 15, 2011
After helping Yosshi arrange a date, the Sket-dan run into Shinzou arguing with his younger brother. Unlike the proper samurai, his younger brother is rebellious and they don't seem to get along. The two's relationship reminds Switch of his own brother and the events of the past.
25	"Switch Off"; Transliteration: "Suitchi Ofu" (Japanese: スイッチ・オフ)	September 22, 2011
In the second Arc finale, Switch's "origin story" continues as Sawa-chan goes to young Switch and his older brother for help from a stalker. In a moment of spite stemming from jealousy, though, Kazuyoshi sends Switch and Sawa off on their own to buy personal protection items. While they're gone, Sawa's friend Yukino warns Kazuyoshi that the stalker is also a slasher. Kazuyoshi means to go out after his little brother and the girl he loves, but fate intervenes.
26	"Spirit Dance"; Transliteration: "Supiritto Dansu" (Japanese: SPIRIT DANCE)	September 29, 2011
Bossun, Himeko and Switch are having a normal day. But, suddenly, Gintama's main characters (Gintoki, Kagura and Shinpachi) appear.
27	"Together With Onee-san and Bad Scientist"; Transliteration: "O Nē San to Baddo Saientisuto to Issho" (Japanese: おねえさんとバッド・サイエンティストといっしょ)	October 6, 2011
The Sket-dan get a new assistant homeroom teacher (who wants everyone to call her, Onee-san), but she's a klutz and is upset she can't be a good role model for the students, so the Sket-dan ask Chuu-san to help with some of his strange drugs. Later, Switch goes through some old inventions of his that didn't work out as intended.
28	"Shinba Michiru's Elegant Cooking"; Transliteration: "Shinba Michiru no Ereganto Kukkingu" (Japanese: 榛葉道流のエレガントクッキング)	October 13, 2011
When the broadcasting club begins a weekly television talk show, their first guest is charismatic Student Council Shinba Michiru. The idea is for him to lead a cooking segment, but the show becomes chaotic due to Shinba's less-than-helpful assistants, the manipulative Agata and moody Daisey.
29	"The Second Coming of the Mistaken Angel"; Transliteration: "Ayamachi no Enjeru Sairin" (Japanese: 過ちのエンジェル再臨)	October 20, 2011
Dante is back, and this time he's missing something from his pencil—but could he have a crush on someone? Plus Bossun and the gang discover another of captain's amazing talents, and try and put it to good use, but...
30	"Turn the Crank-nyora!"; Transliteration: "Gachagacha Shita Nyora" (Japanese: ガチャガチャしたにょら☆)	October 27, 2011
The Sket-dan get obsessed with collecting a full set of "Super Slim-Figured Slenders" gatcha figures... Next Momoka's seem to have fame and moe get her head. Can her friends get back the real Momoka?
31	"Samurai and clothes" Transliteration: "Bushi to Fukusō" (Japanese: 武士と服装)	November 3, 2011
Shinzou asks the Sket-dan for help with a makeover to make a good impression when he meets Megumi-dono, a friend he made online, in person. But is shinzou in modern clothes even him anymore? Can Shinzou somehow rectify his samurai beliefs with modern garb? Later, Himeko tries a new workout video, but it doesn't "work out"....
32	"Thief Dance, Plus"; Transliteration: "Nusutto Dansu Hoka" (Japanese: ヌスット・ダンス他)	November 10, 2011
The Ninja squad Thief-dan is sent on a mission to go rescue Chuu-san's captured daughter! Then Rocket Dance blasts off into outer-space! Is there anywhere the Sket-dan can't go?!
33	"The Glass Man"; Transliteration: "Garasu Otoko" (Japanese: ガラス男)	November 17, 2011
The Sket-dan is getting filmed for an in depth story by the AV Club, and their task is to unravel the mystery of the glass man, a case of serial window breaking's around the school. As the Sket-dan narrows down the suspects, the culprit becomes clear, but could this case be a little bit too easy?
34	"Onee-san Romantic Laboratory"; Transliteration: "O Nē San Kenkyūjo Romantikku Ganbaru!" (Japanese: おねえさん研究所Rがんばる!)	November 24, 2011
Roman's got a new club member, and she's gotta show her the basics of shoujo manga! So she decides to draw her own "how to draw manga" guide, with hilarious results! Next, Onee-san is back and clumsier than ever! is there anything she's actually good at?
35	"Quiz Warrior Enigman"; Transliteration: "Kuizu Senshi Eniguman" (Japanese: クイズ戦士エニグマン)	December 1, 2011
The Sket-dan is challenged to a battle of wits by Enigman, the masked president of the Quiz club (and his lovely assistant Quettion). Later, a drop dead gorgeous second year comes to the Sket-dan to ask for advice... about love? Can the Sket-dan unravel the enigma of love?
36	"Ogress"; Transliteration: "Ōguresu" (Japanese: OGRESS)	December 8, 2011
Himeko breaks her Cyclone while helping a client who was being shaken down for cash from a bully... But when buying a new field hockey stick, she's reminded of her past...
37	"Kunpuu, Pleasant Breeze"; Transliteration: "Kunpū" (Japanese: 薫風)	December 15, 2011
In the third Arc finale, Hime goes to a high school far away to escape her violent past, but the rumors of "Onihime" have spread. When a newfound friend gets into trouble with small-time Yakuza hoods, will Hime step in at the risk of exposing her old identity? Also: the secret origin of Sket Dance!
38	"Kigurumi Break"; Transliteration: "Kigurumi Bureiku" (Japanese: きぐるみぶれいく)	December 22, 2011
The Sket-dan is roped into helping with Onee-san's ex-kid's show's stage performance, but they never would have thought it'd turn into a race against time to bring smiles to children's faces and prevent severe bodily harm to themselves!
39	"One Broken, Special... New Year's"; Transliteration: "Kowareteshimatta Tokubetsu na... Shōgatsu" (Japanese: 壊れてしまった特別な…正月)	January 5, 2012
Yamanobe-sensei is back, and this time he's brought a vintage game console for Switch to repair. The Sket-dan ends up getting hooked on the one game he owns for it, but something smells fishy about it...
40	"Stakeout Blues"; Transliteration: "Suteikuauto Burūsu" (Japanese: ステイクアウト・ブルース)	January 12, 2012
Kids are getting shaken down around school, and there's only one group to call! The Sket-dan! The Student Council! Wait, both?! Can Bossun and Tsubaki stop hating each other's guts for long enough to catch the bad guy?
41	"Vs. Student Council! The Rare Man who Needlessly Fears the Battle Q!"; Transliteration: "Bāsasu Seitokai! Batoru Kyū o Kiyū Suru Keu na Otoko" (Japanese: VS生徒会!バトルQを杞憂する稀有な男)	January 19, 2012
Enigman and Quettion are back, and their next victims are the Student Council! With the super-genius Agata stuck in a staff meeting, can the others make it through and win to get an embarrassing photo back? Later, Enigman is back to ask the Sket dance for advice on his date with Quettion!
42	"Momoka's Sudden Road to Stage Actress"; Transliteration: "Yaniwa ni Momoka Butai Joyū e no Michi" (Japanese: やにわにモモカ舞台女優への道)	January 26, 2012
Momoka is the lead actress of a stage play, but she's having trouble with the bland script. Can the Sket-dan teach her how to spice it up?! And then another Sket friend has a success story: Roman, who's just made her manga debut! She shows her story to the Sket members, but will Himeko be able to keep from trashing it?!
43	"Bashful Girl"; Transliteration: "Hazukashi Gāru" (Japanese: ハズカシガール)	February 2, 2012
Himeko saves a first-year student, Jin, from some punks, and he falls head over heels for her. In order to get him to stop hounding her, Himeko tells Jin that she's already got a boyfriend... Bossun! Now all she has to do is prove it to him...
44	"Drop"; Transliteration: "Doroppu" (Japanese: ドロップ)	February 9, 2012
The Sket Dance help Captain rekindle a broken friendship by helping her find a lost tin of candy drops after she gave one to the boy Akina likes!
45	"Whispering Onee-san's Instruct-son"; Transliteration: "Hisohiso O Nē San Insutorakuson" (Japanese: ひそひそおねえさんインストラクソン)	February 16, 2012
J-son-sensei has another meeting with a prospective marriage partner, but this time the Sket-dan has a plan! Meanwhile, Onee-san is also asked out on a date!
46	"Happy Birthday Part 1"; Transliteration: "Happī Bāsudē Zenpen" (Japanese: Happy Birthday 前編)	February 24, 2012
One day, Bossun, at age 14, discovers a box of video tapes in his mother's room. The videos show his young mother, a pretty woma named Haru, and a man who looks just like him...
47	"Happy Birthday Part 2"; Transliteration: "Happī Bāsudē Kōhen" (Japanese: Happy Birthday 後編)	March 1, 2012
On Bossun's 15 birthday, he finds out the truth about his parents. Unable to cope with the tragedy, he lashes out, only to meet the child his father once saved when he was a kid, all grown up, who gives him a mysterious letter his father wrote addressed to his real mother, and one addressed to him...
48	"Happy Rebirthday"; Transliteration: "Happī Ribāsudē" (Japanese: Happy Rebirthday)	March 8, 2012
It's the kaimei festival, and Bossun's class is doing a maid cafe. Everybody's parents show up, and Bossun is approached by a man who claims to be the doctor who delivered him. He has finally decided to tell Bossun the truth of what happened that day, which he has kept secret for 17 years...
49	"Genesis World Grand Prix"; Transliteration: "Jeneshisu Wārudo Guran Puri" (Japanese: ジェネシス・ワールド・グランプリ)	March 15, 2012
Countries from around the world gather together once every four years to celebrate the most ancient of traditions, the pinnacle of sports! Testing their own passion and training against the best the world has to offer, the Sket-dan goes forth, with the pride of their country on the line! Will the goddess of victory shine down on our heroes? Will they be able to claim that yes, they are the winners of the Genesis World Grand Prix?
50	"I'll Do Anything, Master"; Transliteration: "Nandemo Yarimasse Go Shūjin Sama" (Japanese: なんでもやりまっせご主人様)	March 22, 2012
After a bit of horsing around, Himeko accidentally breaks Bossun's fingers and wrist. To pay him back Bossun makes Himeko sign a contract making her his servant! But having Himeko as a maid isn't all it's cracked up to be. Meanwhile, Jin is back trying to woo Himeko, but when he comes to observe the Sket-dan's activities, all he can see is a loving, bickering couple.
51	"Happy to Meet You"; Transliteration: "Aete Ureshii" (Japanese: 会えて嬉しい)	March 29, 2012
The SKET Dance Season 1 finale! In this episode, Bossun and Tsubaki partner up for the first time to work on a project. But because of these two brothers' conflicting personalities and ideals, there is sure to be utter chaos! Can Bossun and Tsubaki put aside their differences and fulfill the request? Later on, Tsubaki meets Bossun's family for a dinner, and is given the chance to get to know his real parents for the very first time. What kind of chaos will transpire when Bossun and Tsubaki sit down and have dinner together? And more importantly, how will Tsubaki react on getting to know his real parents?

=== Season 2: SECOND DANCE (2012) ===
No.	Title	Original release date
52	"Twin Tail Tsundere Girl"; Transliteration: "Tsuin Tēru Tsundere Gāru" (Japanese: ツインテールツンデレガール)	April 5, 2012
In the Season 2 premiere, The Sket-dan meets Saaya, a first-year student who's got tsundere troubles. She wants the Sket-dan to help her stop being so snotty around boys and Bossun becomes the test subject! Then, it's a real hoot as the Sket-dan and Saaya try raising an owl in the clubroom!
53	"A Graceful Melody for Koma-chan"; Transliteration: "Koma Chan ni Okuru Shitoyaka na Kyoku" (Japanese: コマちゃんに贈る淑やかな曲)	April 12, 2012
The Sket-dan try to help Koma-chan, a huge girl with a tiny voice. Koma-chan wants to find love, but every time she gets nervous, her near-superhuman strength is unleashed, as Bossun learns first hand.
54	"Get the Fortune Teller!"; Transliteration: "Uranaishi o Yattsukero" (Japanese: 占い師をやっつけろ)	April 19, 2012
When Yuuki falls under the influence of a seemingly scamming celebrity psychic, it's the Sket-dan to the rescue! But to take down the fraudulent fortune teller, they'll have to head to her home turf, at a seminar in front of hundreds of true believers.
55	"The Man Who Was Called Laughing on the Outside, but Origami on the Inside"; Transliteration: "Kao de Waratte Kokoro de Origami to Yobareta Otoko" (Japanese: 顔で笑って心でおり神と呼ばれた男)	April 26, 2012
After Bossun drinks another one of Chuu-sensei's concoctions, his feelings and expressions become mismatched! And then, Bossun becomes an origami master, but can he overcome nervous jitters to win a major contest.
56	"Can I Go Backstage?"; Transliteration: "Gakuya ni Itte Ii kai?" (Japanese: 楽屋に行っていいかい?)	May 3, 2012
Both Switch's PC and laptop are broken so he speaks via his sketchbook while he's attending Momoka's concert. Can he act like his usual self? Also, this episode contains about 6 minutes of Biscuit Dance.
57	"You've Got Mail!"; Transliteration: "Yū Gatta Mēru!" (Japanese: ユーガッタメール!)	May 10, 2012
Bossun gets addicted to his phone when he has a pen pal who he sends e-mails to. At the same time, Hime also gets a pen pal when she fills in for Koma. As the two get close with their pen pals, they arrange a date to meet each other. Will their dates go well?
58	"Stop! Invisible Man-kun"; Transliteration: "Sutoppu! Tōmei Ningen Kun" (Japanese: ストップ!透明人間くん)	May 17, 2012
Because of Chuma's another drug, Bossun turns invisible. Everything went well until Bossun's body can be seen little by little from the top. He later meets Himeko and Switch, who will help him to cover his 'out zone' part of body with anything they have. Later, Bossun puts on an artificially intelligent "power suit" created by switch, but the suit soon develops a will of its own!
59	"Tsubaki and Daisy"; Transliteration: "Tsubaki to Hinagiku" (Japanese: 椿と雛菊)	May 24, 2012
When Daisey runs afoul of the leader of a group of delinquents who threatens to trash Kaimei High unless she becomes his woman, Tsubaki takes it upon himself to avenge her honor and set things to rights
60	"Go Forth! Everyone Concentrate and Cooperate at the Pelocan Girl Study Group"; Transliteration: "Susume! Shūchūryoku o Takame, Minna de Kyōryoku Shiau Perokyan Gāru Benkyōkai" (Japanese: 進め!集中力を高め、みんなで協力し合うペロキャンガール勉強会)	May 31, 2012
Himeko becomes the new Pelocan campaign girl for a TV commercial, but her sudden stage fright threatens to derail the whole thing! Then, when the Sket-dan is unprepared for the following day's practice exams, they go to Himeko's house to study. Featuring Himeko's mom, the Legendary Oniyome
61	"The Manga Girl Aims for the Wilderness and Has a Meeting"; Transliteration: "Manga Otome wa Kōya o Mezashite Kaigi Suru." (Japanese: 漫画乙女は荒野を目指して会議する。)	June 7, 2012
Fumi-chan is a great artist, but what will happen when she tries to emulate Roman's style of manga?! And speaking of emulate, when Tsubaki temporarily loses his vision, the Sket-dan plays a prank on him by pretending to be the other members of Student Council... but then they're stuck in the situation
62	"Skip!"; Transliteration: "Sukippu!" (Japanese: Skip!)	June 14, 2012
The students of Kaimei High are going on a class trip, but first, they have to participate in a rope skipping competition to see which class gets the best rooms. Saaya doesn't have an athletic bone in her body, so is worried she's going to doom her class to the worst rooms of all, until the Sket-dan tries teaching her how to skip! After, Tsubaki's class has to sit with Bossun's bus for there were only 7 buses and 8 classes. On a 20 minutes break, Switch suggests to Saaya to ask Bossun directly how he feels towards Himeko. However, there's a problem. Due to Chuuma's drug, Bossun and Himeko's souls are switched! Not only that, Tsubaki is also hypnotized!
63	"School Trip Rhapsody Part 1"; Transliteration: "Sukūru Torippu Rapusodī Zenpen" (Japanese: 修学旅行狂詩曲 前編)	June 21, 2012
Due to Bossun and Himeko's situation, things get tense when their female classmates asks Himeko (Bossun) to change or to take a bath, and Bossun (Himeko)'s help is making things worse. Meanwhile, Switch is keeping an eye out for Saaya, Tsubaki is acting like a cat, and Chuma is making a cure for Bossun and Himeko. Can Bossun and Himeko avoid giving out secrets during their ski trip?
64	"School Trip Rhapsody Part 2"; Transliteration: "Sukūru Torippu Rapusodī Kōhen" (Japanese: 修学旅行狂詩曲 後編)	June 28, 2012
In the conclusion of the mind-switching school trip arc and the first arc finale, Saaya asks Bossun (Himeko) What he thinks of Himeko. Bossun (Himeko) never thought of it before, and answers like how she would think Bossun would answer, saying that they are just friends. Then Bossun (Himeko) asks Saaya what she thinks of him, with Saaya responding 'I don't know, but your always on my mind.' Afterword, Bossun and himeko decide to sleep together in Chuma's room because they couldn't sleep last night (Himeko being with a bunch of guys and Bosssun being tied up) but to their surprise, there is only one bed, so they decide to share it. Himeko asks what does he think of Saaya, Bossun then answers saying she's just a friend. Himeko then tells Bossun that Saaya wanted to speak to him earlier, and asked her what do you think of Himeko, and Himeko asks him if her response was correct. In the bonus story Quest Dance, Bossun and company are recast as loser adventurers in the fantasy game world.
65	"He's Interested in the Sister and the Brother's Interested in Him"; Transliteration: "Imōto no Ki ni Naru Aitsu ga Ki ni Naru Ani" (Japanese: 妹の気になるアイツが気になる兄)	July 5, 2012
Because of his sister complex the president makes the mistake of thinking that his little sister is in love with Tsubaki.
66	"Seeking Out Tsukkomi"; Transliteration: "Saguriau Tsukkomi" (Japanese: さぐりあうツッコミ)	July 12, 2012
When Switch brings out an invention that can read the minds of animals, he and the other members quickly find out that it can also read their thoughts! Later, Momoka comes and asks for Himeko's help to be a contestant in a comedy show that Momoka is currently being the host assistant for, as she knew Himeko has great skill in tsukkomi. But her opponent is a pro, can she beat him?
67	"Tsubaki's Lame Deep Meaning T-Shirt"; Transliteration: "Tsubaki Dasa Tī Oku ga Fukai" (Japanese: 椿ダサＴオクガフカイ)	July 19, 2012
Tsubaki's hobby is making original T-shirt designs, but when his fellow Student Council members proclaim them "lame", he goes to his twin brother Bossun for a shot of creative advice. Later, Switch and Bossun are evenly matched in their quiz challenge on a popular mecha anime show, Code A: Chian's Counterattack, so Switch invites Bossun to an otaku meet-up to see who is best between him and Switch. But when Switch doesn't show up texting he has a cold, will Bossun be able to fit in and prove himself?
68	"Operation Love Potion"; Transliteration: "Operēshon Rabu Pōshon" (Japanese: オペレーション・ラブポーション)	July 26, 2012
When Suzu notices how Onee-san and her father are very close, she asks the Sket Dan to help her and Onee-san use the love potion on her father. However the drug has very specific instructions to work. With Bossun's plan of how to administer the drug, can Suzu and Onee-san pull it off?!
69	"Poop is in Heaven, So the Student Council Come"; Transliteration: "Un wa Ten ni Aru node, Kitare Seitokai" (Japanese: ウンは天にあるので、来たれ生徒会)	August 2, 2012
Bossun needs to go poop, but things keep him from getting to the bathroom. Also, the Student Council decides to make fliers to get new members.
70	"The Last Day of President"; Transliteration: "Za Rasuto Dei obu Purejidento" (Japanese: The last day of president)	August 9, 2012
Tsubaki is taking over as Student Council President, but for his goal on making Kaimei High a better school, he becomes strict with anything that breaks school rules. But in the end Agata tells hint here are more important things than rules. Three days later, Tsubaki officially replaces Agata, and in a speech a he says he will make Kaimei High a better school with everyone's co-operation, getting a big applause. On the same day, Agata receives a phone call from a mysterious caller stating they have kidnapped his younger sister Saaya. The caller tells him in order to save her, Agata must solve 4 puzzle problems he gives in 15 minutes, each on a floor below. Can Agata save his sister on his last day as president?
71	"Genius Poopman Yearning"; Transliteration: "Tensai Unkoman Bojō" (Japanese: 天才ウンコマン慕情)	August 16, 2012
The first story is a reference to a Japanese folktale, the Crab and the Monkey, with Himeko being the crab's daughter and Switch, the monkey. Himeko puts out fliers for allies to plan revenge on the monkey, with highly intelligent Poop (Bossun), gluttonous Chestnut (Captain), oversized Bee (Koma), and a Mortar (Dante). In the second story, Kuroda requests the Sket-dan to turn Dante back to his visual Kei self since for some odd reason he has gone Enka style. After many failed attempts with Enka songs, Bossun figures out the reason Dante has gone Enka style.
72	"Chase Kagerō!"; Transliteration: "Kagerō o Oe!" (Japanese: 影狼を追え!)	August 23, 2012
Kagerou, a ninja-like purse and wallet snatching thief, has been targeting the students of Kaimei recently. A first year tells them to not pursue Kagerou, but they ignore his warning. Bossun and Himeko set up a way to catch the thief, but when the thief comes, a smoke bomb explodes, and the confusion causes Himeko to knock Bossun unconscious.
73	"The Time I Fully Came to Know Peeping..."; Transliteration: "Nozoki... Shirisomeshi Koro ni..." (Japanese: 覗き…しりそめし頃に…)	August 30, 2012
Sket Dance and the Student Council try to catch a peeping tom; Roman and Michinori are having a manga battle to decide who is a better manga artist.
74	"Food Fighter Home Visit"; Transliteration: "Fūdo Faitā o Taku Hōmon!" (Japanese: フードファイターお宅訪問!)	September 6, 2012
When Bossun, Himeko and Tsubaki goes to Mimorin's house to retrieve a toy car; Captain does another food challenge at Mimorin's house.
75	"Solitude"; Transliteration: "Sorichūdo" (Japanese: SOLITUDE)	September 13, 2012
Because he endangered students by acting on his own, Katou gets lectured by Tsubaki. But things get worse when a former teacher at Katou's middleschool transfers in Kaimei and starts picking on Himeko...
76	"To Build A Better Academy!!"; Transliteration: "Yori Yoi Gakuen Zukuri no Tame ni!!" (Japanese: より良い学園作りの為に!!)	September 20, 2012
Katou, now a full-fledged member of the Student Council, proves how serious he is about his new tasks. Later, in order to help Usami and her dislike of men, the boys of the Sket-dan and the Student Council cross-dress.
77	"The Academy SKETs (After That)!"; Transliteration: "Gakuen no Suketto Tachi (Sono Go)" (Japanese: 学園のＳＫＥＴ達（その後）)	September 27, 2012
The SKET Dance series finale! Sugihara Teppei, their client from the very first episode, is back! And he has one final request for the Sket-dan: to help him and his club win the basketball game. And Saaya has something important to say to Bossun in private, perhaps her real feelings? What events will transpire in this tumultuous final episode? Can the anime really end like this? What will happen to the Sket-dan?

=== OVA (2013) ===
No.	Title	Original release date
OVA	"Sket Dance OVA"; Transliteration: "Suketto Dansu Ranshi" (Japanese: スケットダンスOVA)	February 4, 2013
An adaptation of Chapters 198 to 200, also known as the Love Triangle arc. Shinba shares his plans with Saaya and the Sket Dan to fix Soijiro's perspectives on Saaya's love interests.

== DVD releases ==
Season 1: SKET Dance
Volume	Date	Discs	Episodes	Reference
1	August 26, 2011	1	1–4	
2	September 21, 2011	1	5-7	
3	October 28, 2011	1	8-10	
4	November 25, 2011	1	11-13	
5	December 21, 2011	1	14-16	
6	January 7, 2012	1	17-19	
7	February 24, 2011	1	20-22	
8	March 23, 2012	1	23-25	
9	April 27, 2012	1	26-28	
10	May 25, 2012	1	29-31	
11	June 22, 2012	1	32-34	
12	July 27, 2012	1	35-37	
13	August 24, 2012	1	38-40	
14	September 28, 2012	1	41-43	
15	October 26, 2012	1	44-46	
16	November 30, 2012	1	47-49	
17	December 28, 2012	1	50-51	

Season 2: SECOND DANCE
Volume	Date	Discs	Episodes	Reference
1	January 30, 2013	1	52-54	
2	January 30, 2013	1	55-57	
3	February 22, 2013	1	58-60	
4	February 22, 2013	1	61-63	
5	March 22, 2013	1	64-66	
6	March 22, 2013	1	67-69	
7	April 26, 2013	1	70-72	
8	April 26, 2013	1	73-75	
9	May 24, 2013	1	76-77	

== Theme music ==
The anime uses nineteen pieces of theme music: six opening themes and thirteen ending themes.

Opening Themes
#	Transcription/Translation	Performed by	Episodes
1	Kakko Warui I love you!	French Kiss of AKB48	2-17
2	Michi!	The Sketchbook	18-26
3	Graffiti	Gackt	27-39
4	Message	The Sketchbook	40-46, 48-51
5	Reboot	everset	53-63
6	Clear	The Sketchbook	65-76

Ending themes
#	Transcription/Translation	Performed by	Episodes
1	Kakko Warui I love you!	French Kiss of AKB48	1, 51
2	Comic Sonic	The Pillows	2-16
3	Funny Bunny (Rock Stock Version)	The Pillows	17
4	Clover	The Sketchbook	18-24, 26
5	Kioku	The Sketchbook	25
6	Milk and Chocolate	ChocoLe	27-36, 38-39
7	HERO	The Sketchbook	37
8	Party! Hallelujah!	SKET ROCK	40-46, 49-50
9	Message	The Sketchbook	47
10	Birthday	The Sketchbook	48
11	Colors	The Sketchbook	52-61, 63
12	Sekai wa Okujou de Miwataseta	SKET x Sketch	65-69, 71-72, 74-75
13	Sekai wa Okujou de Miwataseta: Gasshou Ver.	Kaimei Gakuen Seitokai Shikko-bu	70
14	Startup	The Sketchbook	77
15	REFLECT	The Sketchbook	OVA
