= Norimitsu Kaihō =

Japanese novelist and translator

- 海法 紀光
- Born: Kanagawa prefecture
- Education: Keio University
- Occupation: Light novel writer

Norimitsu Kaihō (Japanese: 海法 紀光, Hepburn: Kaihō Norimitsu) is a Japanese light novel writer and translator. Born in Kanagawa prefecture. He is from Keio University Fantasy Study Group. When he was a college student, he posted a coterie translation of an English tabletop RPG "TORG" supplement to Shinkigensha, which was publishing a translated version of this game at the time, and became a member of the translation team because of his ability. Since then, he has expanded his range of activities to translating American comics and writing novels.

Kaihō has had experience teaming up with Kazutaka Kodaka. While the original plot for the anime Danganronpa 3: The End of Hope's Peak High School was planned by Kodaka, Kaihō was in charge of revising the scripts to adapt them into the anime series. Kaihō was chosen by Lerche to write the anime based on his knowledge with the franchise. For Akudama Drive, Kaihō and Kodaka had multiple talks in the making of the anime's script and left it to director Tomohisa Taguchi to decide how to handle it once finishing it. In an Anime Trending poll, Kaihō won the "Best in Original Screenplay" award.

== Works ==
=== Novel ===
- Enterbrain Famitsu Bunko
- Valkyrie's Gambit Rinne Senki Zenoscape
- Go beyond my corpse Cursed siblings' round dance
- GUILTY GEAR X Lightning the Argent
- GUILTY GEAR X Butterfly and Her Gale
- Growlanser Midnight Rainbow
- Shikigami no Shiro O.V.E.R.S.ver 0.81
- Shikigami no Shiro Gunsmoke Witch
- Shikigami no Shiro II Sun Volume
- Shikigami no Shiro II Yin no Maki
- Shikigami no Shiro II Paradise Typhoon
- Shikigami no Shiro III World Time Travelers
- Jingai Makyo Fantastica of Nine
- Jingai Makyo Riders of Darkness
- Harvest Publishing / Minori Bunko
- Goddess Ibunroku Devil Survivor Anthology Novel
- Tadashi Oboromura ~ Princess Torigo and Pinky Swear ~
- ASCII Media Works Dengeki Game Bunko
- ROBOTICS; NOTES Unpublished notes of Misaki Senomiya

=== Drama CD ===
- GUILTY GEAR X Drama CD VOL.1, VOL.2
- GUILTY GEAR XX Drama CD SIDE: RED, BLACK
- GUILTY GEAR XX Drama CD "Night of Nives Vol.1 ~ 3"

=== Manga ===
- Guilty Gear XTRA (Original draft, illustration: Shoji Kumai, Monthly Magazine Z)
- School-Live! (Original <Collaboration with Nitroplus>, illustration: Sadoru Chiba, Manga Time Kirara Forward July 2012–January 2020)
- School-Live! Letters (Original, illustration: Sadoru Chiba, Manga Time Kirara Forward August 2020 issue–)
- Labyrinth Detective Minato Lock (provisional) → If death also dies (Original <jointly with Hikaru Sakurai>, illustration: Komaku, cooperation: Monster *Lounge, Monthly Dragon Age December 2018 issue–, 2019 1 Renamed to monthly issue)
- Deep Insanity: Nirvana (Original draft <jointly with Makoto Fukami>, illustration: Etorouji Shiono, Monthly Big Gangan 2020 vol.2–2023 vol.4)
- Houkago Isekai Futari Tabi (放課後異世界ふたり旅) (Original, illustration: Mei Aida, Good! Afternoon April 2025–)
- Akarui Mirai (Original, illustration: Kurageso, Manga Time Kirara Forward September 2025–)

=== Game scenario ===
- Jingai Makyo (in the name of Shiro Yato)
- Home GUILTY GEAR X Story Mode
- Home GUILTY GEAR XX Story Mode
- GUILTY GEAR 2 OVERTURE Story mode

=== Anime ===
Series head writer is denoted in bold.

- Gargantia on the Verdurous Planet (2013)
- **Gunslinger Stratos** (2015)
- **School-Live!** (2015)
- Luck & Logic (2016)
- **Danganronpa 3: The End of Hope’s Peak High School** (2016)
- Kaiju Girls (2016): original draft and setting
- **Magical Girl Spec-Ops Asuka** (2019)
- **Astra Lost in Space** (2019)
- **Akudama Drive** (2020)
- **Giant Beasts of Ars** (2023)
- Solo Leveling (2024)
- **Guilty Gear Strive: Dual Rulers** (2025)

=== Live action TV ===
- Kamen Rider Gaim (2014)

=== RPGs ===
- Table talk RPG
- BEAST BIND Demon Beast Bond R.P.G (in charge of the world view part. Main design is Junichi Inoue)

=== Translation ===
- TORG (one of the translation teams, Shinkigensha)
- X-Men (translated version released by Shogakukan Productions)
- Watchmen (one of the translation teams, Shogakukan Productions)
- Sandman (Interbooks)
