= Ōsama-tachi no Viking =

Japanese manga series

- Cover of the first tankōbon volume

王様達のヴァイキング (Ōsama-tachi no Vaikingu)
- Manga
- Written by: Sadayasu; Makoto Fukami (collaboration)
- Illustrated by: Sadayasu
- Published by: Shogakukan
- Magazine: Weekly Big Comic Spirits
- Original run: March 4, 2013 – August 26, 2019
- Volumes: 19
- icon

Ōsama-tachi no Viking (Japanese: 王様達のヴァイキング, Hepburn: Ōsama-tachi no Vaikingu; 'The King's Viking') is a Japanese manga series written and illustrated by Sadayasu, with collaboration from Makoto Fukami. It was serialized in Shogakukan's seinen manga magazine Weekly Big Comic Spirits from March 2013 to August 2019, with its chapters collected in nineteen tankōbon volumes.

== Plot ==
Kazuki Koreeda is an 18-year-old social outcast and high school dropout, unable to hold even a part-time job. His sole exceptional skill is his mastery of hacking. In a fit of rage, he orchestrates a cyberattack against a major financial institution. His actions draw the attention of Daisuke Sakai, a mysterious and wealthy angel investor, who offers Koreeda an audacious opportunity: to use his hacking prowess to achieve global domination. Forging an unlikely alliance, the reclusive hacker and the enigmatic investor embark on a mission to dismantle and reshape the world order.

== Publication ==
Written and illustrated by Sadayasu, with collaboration from Makoto Fukami, Ōsama-tachi no Viking was serialized in Shogakukan's seinen manga magazine Weekly Big Comic Spirits from March 4, 2013, to August 26, 2019. Shogakukan collected is chapters in nineteen tankōbon volumes, released from June 28, 2013, to September 30, 2019.

=== Volumes ===
No.	Release date	ISBN
1	June 28, 2013	978-4-09-185329-5
2	September 30, 2013	978-4-09-185414-8
3	January 30, 2014	978-4-09-185845-0
4	June 12, 2014	978-4-09-186204-4
5	September 30, 2014	978-4-09-186354-6
6	December 26, 2014	978-4-09-186658-5
7	April 30, 2015	978-4-09-186889-3
8	July 30, 2015	978-4-09-187140-4
9	November 30, 2015	978-4-09-187338-5
10	April 28, 2016	978-4-09-187598-3
11	October 28, 2016	978-4-09-187899-1
12	February 28, 2017	978-4-09-189378-9
13	July 28, 2017	978-4-09-189607-0
14	November 30, 2017	978-4-09-189689-6
15	March 30, 2018	978-4-09-189816-6
16	July 30, 2018	978-4-09-860048-9
17	January 30, 2019	978-4-09-860208-7
18	June 28, 2019	978-4-09-860319-0
19	September 30, 2019	978-4-09-860405-0

== Reception ==
Ōsama-tachi no Viking was one of the Jury Recommended Works at the 18th Japan Media Arts Festival in 2014. The series was nominated for the eighth Manga Taishō in 2015 and placed ninth with 35 points.
