= Astra Lost in Space =

Japanese manga series

- First tankōbon volume cover, featuring Aries Spring (left) and Kanata Hoshijima (right)

彼方のアストラ (Kanata no Asutora)
- Genre: Drama; Mystery; Science fiction
- Manga
- Written by: Kenta Shinohara
- Published by: Shueisha
- English publisher: NA: Viz Media
- Imprint: Jump Comics+
- Magazine: Shōnen Jump+
- Original run: May 9, 2016 – December 30, 2017
- Volumes: 5
- Anime television series
- Directed by: Masaomi Andō
- Written by: Norimitsu Kaihō
- Music by: Masaru Yokoyama; Nobuaki Nobusawa
- Studio: Lerche
- Licensed by: Crunchyroll (Note: In North America through Crunchyroll, LLC (formerly known as Funimation).); SA/SEA: Medialink
- Original network: AT-X, Tokyo MX, TVA, KBS, SUN, BS11
- Original run: July 3, 2019 – September 18, 2019
- Episodes: 12
- icon

Astra Lost in Space (Japanese: 彼方のアストラ, Hepburn: Kanata no Asutora) is a Japanese manga series written and illustrated by Kenta Shinohara. It was serialized online from May 2016 to December 2017 via Shueisha's Shōnen Jump+ website/app. It was collected in five tankōbon volumes. Viz Media published the series in English. An anime television series adaptation produced by Lerche aired from July to September 2019.

== Plot ==
In 2063, space travel has become possible and commercially viable; a group of students from Caird High School departs to the nearby planet of McPa for their Planetary Camp. Soon after the group arrives on the planet, the nine children encounter a mysterious and unforeseen intelligent sphere of light; it attacks them, transporting them into the distant depths of space. Floating in orbit around an unknown planet, they discover an old abandoned spacecraft nearby. Finding it in working order, they resolve to use the ship to return home. To do so, they must cross the 5,012-light-year gulf of space separating them from home by visiting alien planets, the names of which are all anagrams, harboring life to replenish and manage their limited resources.

The journey home aboard their vessel, which they name Astra, brings with it new character revelations, strengthening the bonds they share, and the eventual realization that the stakes of their journey are far higher than any of them could ever have realized.

== Characters ==
Kanata Hoshijima (カナタ・ホシジマ)
Voiced by: Yūsuke Kobayashi (drama CD), Yoshimasa Hosoya (anime) (Japanese); Jessie James Grelle (Note: Credited as Josh Grelle; Grelle came out as transgender and changed their name in 2023.) (English)
An optimistic guy with good athletic ability and captain of the Astra. While he has interest about space thanks to his now-deceased teacher, his father forced him to take a part in athletic activity. His lifelong dream is to be able to explore outer space while captaining his own ship.
Aries Spring (アリエス・スプリング, Ariesu Supuringu)
Voiced by: Ayaka Suwa (drama CD), Inori Minase (anime) (Japanese); Megan Shipman (English)
Aries sometimes acts like an airhead and sometimes has flashes of inspiration. She also has an eidetic memory. While her eyes are both green, her left eye color is slightly pale compared to the right one. She transferred to the school only a month before the trip.
Luca Esposito (ルカ・エスポジト, Ruka Esupojito)
Voiced by: Ayumu Murase (drama CD), Risae Matsuda (anime) (Japanese); Ciarán Strange (English)
A naturally curious boy and a talented engineer capable of repairing any damage to the Astra. His father Marco is a controversial senator.
Charce Lacroix (シャルス・ラクロワ, Sharusu Rakurowa)
Voiced by: Sōichirō Hoshi (drama CD), Nobunaga Shimazaki (anime) (Japanese); Jason Liebrecht (English)
A handsome, intelligent student botanist who uses his cooking and botany skills to ensure the crew is properly fed. He acts as Kanata's first mate.
Quitterie Raffaëlli (キトリー・ラファエリ, Kitorī Rafaeri)
Voiced by: Lynn (drama CD), Tomoyo Kurosawa (anime) (Japanese); Sakyiwaa Baah, Dani Chambers (young) (English)
A rich heiress who is the daughter of a famous doctor. She finds it difficult to trust other people besides Zack, who is her childhood friend. She received very little attention from her mother. She serves as the Astra's "doctor".
Zack Walker (ザック・ウォーカー, Zakku Wōkā)
Voiced by: Daiki Hamano (drama CD), Shunsuke Takeuchi (anime), Shizuka Ishigami (young) (Japanese); Aaron Roberts (English)
A cool and intelligent student who seeks to become a space explorer and has a space pilot license, making him the Astra's main pilot. His father works in the bio-technology industry who is currently working on a project with Quitterie's mother, thus making Quitterie and him childhood friends. His dream is to pilot his own ship with Kanata captaining.
Funicia Raffaëlli (フニシア・ラファエリ, Funishia Rafaeri)
Voiced by: Aimi Tanaka (drama CD), Hina Kino (anime) (Japanese); Dani Chambers, Sakyiwaa Baah (teen) (English)
Nicknamed "Funi" (フニ), she is Quitterie's adopted sister, who was adopted into the family after the death of her parents. She is a cheerful, positive girl who wants to get along with Quitterie. She carries around a puppet named Beego (ビーゴ, Bīgo) with her.
Ulgar Zweig (ウルガー・ツヴァイク, Urugā Tsuvaiku)
Voiced by: Kyousuke Kitayama (drama CD), Koki Uchiyama (anime) (Japanese); Christopher Dontrell Piper (English)
A quiet, antisocial, but highly intelligent boy who does not get along well with the rest of the crew. His father is the vice principal of Caird High. He is good at handling a gun, most of which were banned over a century ago. His late older brother Finn was a freelance journalist who stumbled upon a secret he should not have, which resulted in his death. He is seeking to avenge Finn.
Yun-Hua Lu (ユンファ・ルー, Yunfa Rū)
Voiced by: Saori Hayami (anime) (Japanese); Dawn M. Bennett (English)
A shy, quiet girl who constantly apologizes for everything she does as a result of being emotionally suppressed by her mother, Lucy Lum, a world famous singer. Yun-Hua has a great singing voice, but her mother constantly berated her and told her she should not bring attention to herself, so she distances herself as much as possible.
Polina Livinskaya (ポリーナ・リヴィンスカヤ, Porīna Rivinsukaya)
Voiced by: Hitomi Nabatame (anime) (Japanese); Elizabeth Maxwell (English)
A woman whom the crew of the Astra discovers has been in cryosleep for twelve years on a ship of a similar but older model than the Astra. Her allies were killed, leaving her the only survivor of her crew. They were members of a planetary exploration team looking for other habitable planets.

== Production ==
Kenta Shinohara originally intended to serialize Astra Lost in Space in Weekly Shōnen Jump, but the proposal was rejected. Unwilling to abandon a story for which he had already conceived a core plot twist, he sought to publish it in another format. The manga was subsequently serialized on Shōnen Jump+. Initial popularity was limited; however, following the reveal of its central twist, the series gained more recognition.

Seeking to create a work tonally distinct from his previous series, Sket Dance, Shinohara integrated elements of fantasy science fiction and closed circle mystery.^{[vol. 5]} His initial concept was directly inspired by the 19th-century novel Two Years' Vacation, featuring a group of 15 children. This was scaled down to a core cast of nine characters to better suit a planned shorter serialization of four to five volumes, with some characters' personalities being merged. The narrative retains several elements from the novel, including internal conflicts, banishment, changes in leadership, and character development.^{[vol. 5]}

== Media ==
=== Manga ===
Astra Lost in Space, written and illustrated by Kenta Shinohara, was serialized on Shueisha's digital magazine app and website Shōnen Jump+ from May 9, 2016, to December 30, 2017. Shueisha collected its chapters in five tankōbon volumes, released from July 4, 2016, to February 2, 2018.

In North America, the manga was licensed for English release by Viz Media.

==== Volumes ====
No.	Original release date	Original ISBN	English release date	English ISBN
1	July 4, 2016	978-4-08-880843-7	December 5, 2017	978-1-4215-9694-5
Chapters 1–7
2	November 4, 2016	978-4-08-880869-7	March 6, 2018	978-1-4215-9695-2
Chapters 8–18
3	April 4, 2017	978-4-08-881065-2	June 5, 2018	978-1-4215-9696-9
Chapters 19–28
4	August 4, 2017	978-4-08-881144-4	September 4, 2018	978-1-4215-9697-6
Chapters 29–37
5	February 2, 2018	978-4-08-881314-1	December 4, 2018	978-1-4215-9698-3
Chapters 38–49

=== Anime ===
An anime television series adaptation was announced in February 2019. The series was animated by Lerche and directed by Masaomi Andō, with Norimitsu Kaihō handling series composition, and Keiko Kurosawa designing the characters. Masaru Yokoyama and Nobuaki Nobusawa composed the music. It aired from July 3 to September 18, 2019, on AT-X, Tokyo MX, TVA, KBS, SUN, and BS11. The first and last episodes aired as one-hour specials. Nonoc performed the series' opening theme song "star*frost", while the ending theme, "Glow at the Velocity of Light", was performed by Riko Azuna. Funimation licensed the series in North America and the British Isles, and streamed it in both subtitled and dubbed formats.

==== Episodes ====
No.	Title	Original release date
1	"Planet Camp" (Note: Stylized in all caps)	July 3, 2019
On her way to the planetary camp, Aries Spring has her bag snatched at a spaceport, but fellow student Kanata Hoshijima intervenes. Nine students from Caird High School arrive on the planet McPa for their camp. Shortly after landing, a mysterious sphere appears and transports them adrift in space, where they find an abandoned spaceship. Everyone except Aries boards the vessel. Risking being lost in space with limited fuel, Kanata rescues Aries but exhausts his own fuel; the other students form a human chain to save them both. Safely aboard, the students introduce themselves, and Zack Walker discovers the sphere has moved them 5,012 light-years from home. As paranoia sets in over their impossible situation, Kanata inspires hope by recounting a similar survival experience after a fatal hiking accident. Zack also identifies nearby planets for resupply and a route home. The students unanimously elect Kanata as captain and name their ship the Astra after discovering a plaque bearing the phrase Per Aspera ad Astra.
2	"Wilderness"	July 10, 2019
The students arrive at the wilderness planet Vilavurs for their first resupply stop. They encounter strange wildlife, including parachute plants and trampoline trees. While gathering resources, they spot the mysterious sphere again but successfully evade it. During their time on the planet, Kanata begins eating impulsively, and Quitterie becomes distressed, recalling her unloving wealthy family and resenting her adopted sister, Funicia. When a trampoline tree suddenly rises at night, a winged beast snatches Funicia. Kanata jumps onto the tree, using a javelin left by Luca to rescue her. The incident leads Quitterie and Funicia to reconcile. Kanata later reveals his past training as a world-class athlete by his father. As they prepare to leave Vilavurs, Zack confides to Kanata that the Astra's communications system was deliberately sabotaged, suggesting the culprit is among them.
3	"Meteor"	July 17, 2019
The Astra travels to the next resupply planet, Shummoor. Kanata secretly investigates the saboteur but lacks sufficient information. When Funicia recounts how a mysterious man in sunglasses arranged her adoption, Kanata theorizes that someone intends to kill them all and warns the group. Ulgar reveals he is the son of their school's vice principal, drawing immediate suspicion. Suddenly, micrometeorites strike the ship, breaching the hull and disabling the main power. Without power, the Astra is caught in Shummoor's gravity and plummets uncontrollably. The group frantically seals the hull and connects the gravity controller to a backup generator. The controller's safety mechanism activates upon detecting a small alien creature, forcing Ulgar to immobilize it with a glue gun. Power is restored, allowing Zack to execute a perilous landing. It is later revealed that Ulgar secretly carries a real handgun.
4	"Star of Hope"	July 24, 2019
Following their collective effort to avert the crash, the students reason that the saboteur must also wish to survive and agree to suspend their investigation. They land on Shummoor and begin foraging, encountering large, friendly bird-like aliens they call Gruppies. They discover that most edible plants spoil almost instantly, and the Gruppies are inedible, leaving them without sufficient supplies for the next journey. Yun-Hua then abandons the ship, telling the others to leave without her. Kanata finds her, and she reveals her mother emotionally abused her and taught her to avoid attention. Suddenly, giant mushrooms release poisonous spores, infecting everyone except Kanata and Yun-Hua, who were in spacesuits. Charce explains an antidote mushroom must exist, prompting Kanata and Yun-Hua to recall curing a sick Gruppie with a yellow mushroom. While Kanata gathers the antidote, Yun-Hua sings to soothe her friends, encouraged by Kanata to pursue her dream. Kanata returns with the cure, and Yun-Hua gains newfound self-confidence.
5	"Paradise"	July 31, 2019
After recovering, the group credits Yun-Hua's singing with helping sustain them and learns she is the daughter of famous singer Lucy Lum. Symbolizing her growth, Yun-Hua cuts her hair short. They secure a stable food source and depart Shummoor. Meanwhile, authorities on Earth have nearly abandoned the search for the students after finding nothing on McPa. The parents meet, with most quickly accepting a proposal to declare their children legally dead; only Aries' mother shows genuine concern. The mysterious man in sunglasses Funicia described observes silently from the side of the room. Luca's father, Marco, a powerful and controversial government official, is absent. The group later lands on the oceanic planet Arispade, which they consider a paradise due to its abundant food. Charce discovers all life there reproduces via parthenogenesis. Quitterie teases Aries about her feelings for Kanata, encouraging a confession that Kanata misunderstands, upsetting Aries. While fishing, Luca attempts to connect with Ulgar, who is shocked to learn Luca's father's identity. That evening, during a farewell picnic, Ulgar appears with his gun and holds Luca at gunpoint.
6	"Secret"	August 7, 2019
Ulgar reveals he believes his older brother Finn was murdered by Marco for investigating government corruption and seeks revenge by killing Luca, Marco's presumed heir. Luca discloses he is intersex and was disowned by his family after his younger brother was born, making him an outcast rather than an heir. Ulgar, recognizing a shared alienation, stands down. A sudden earthquake and ensuing tsunami strike the island. While most reach the Astra safely, Ulgar and Luca are swept away. Ulgar attempts self-sacrifice to save Luca, but Kanata rescues them both. After departing Arispade, Ulgar apologizes to Luca and vows to survive and investigate Finn's death. Zack suggests Finn may have uncovered a deeper conspiracy, explaining why the group was targeted. Ulgar decides to become a journalist like Finn, and Kanata allows him to keep the gun. Later, Aries notices an inconsistency in Charce's story regarding a biology class and confronts him alongside the group, suspecting he is hiding something.
7	"Past"	August 14, 2019
Charce reveals he is a transfer student from the Vixia Royal Quarter, the planet's last nation ruled by nobility. He concealed his past out of reluctance to discuss it. He befriended a commoner girl named Seira and once smuggled her into the nobles-only sector. When caught, a guard pushed her during a struggle, and she fell from a building into a coma. Her family later left Vixia with her, and Charce departed as well, vowing to study biology to one day find and heal her. The group is moved by his story, and Charce notes Aries reminds him of Seira. They then arrive at Icriss, a tidally locked planet with one scorching hemisphere and one freezing; the only habitable zone is the narrow terminator line. While seeking a landing spot, a massive carnivorous plant attacks the Astra, inflicting critical damage that traps them on the planet. Zack explains they lack the parts for repairs, resigning them to remain on Icriss. Later, Charce discovers a second, heavily damaged ship of the same model. Investigating the derelict craft, they find someone preserved in its hibernation pod for twelve years and open it to reveal a young woman inside.
8	"Lost and Found"	August 21, 2019
The group revives the woman, who identifies herself as Polina Livinskaya, an astronaut from the ship Ark VI. She explains her mission was to find habitable worlds, but her ship crash-landed on Icriss. When her crew never returned from exploration, she entered the hibernation pod to survive. Aries proposes replacing the Astra's damaged reactor section with the intact one from the Ark VI, as both ships share a modular design. Meanwhile, Yun-Hua informs Polina the year is 2063, causing Polina to panic without explanation. The repair is ultimately successful. While foraging, Zack confides in Quitterie, expressing his desire not to emulate his father, who grew detached due to memory transplant research, and his wish to pilot Kanata's future ship. Quitterie admits she wants to marry him, and he reminds her of their childhood promise. Before departing, the group investigates and finds Polina's crew was consumed by subterranean carnivorous plants. After leaving Icriss, Quitterie notes her and Funicia's blood types are an exact match, an extreme rarity for adopted siblings. Zack conducts a DNA test and privately reveals to Kanata that they are genetically identical.
9	"Revelation"	August 28, 2019
Zack and Kanata reveal to the crew that Quitterie and Funicia are clones, leading to the theory that all of them, except Aries, are clones created as younger vessels for their parents' memories using technology developed by Zack's father. Concurrently, the parents—excluding those of Aries and Charce—are shown meeting, lamenting how the Genome Control Act would expose their children as clones, which motivated stranding them in space to ensure the bodies were never found. Aboard the Astra, the crew is distraught, but Kanata reassures them that their shared journey has forged a true family and gives them a new purpose: to return and bring their parents to justice. He consoles each crew member individually, and most find closure regarding their pasts. Zack and Quitterie announce their engagement. After Zack repairs the space telescope with parts from the Ark VI, he projects an image of their home planet. During the celebration, Polina becomes confused by the planet's appearance, and when the crew identifies it as Astra, not Earth, she becomes hysterical.
10	"Culprit"	September 4, 2019
Through discussion, Polina and the group learn that the histories of Earth and Astra diverged after the Cuban Missile Crisis, which on Astra escalated into World War III and led to a unified global government. Polina explains that on Earth, scientists predicted an asteroid impact in 2057. The Ark ships were dispatched to find habitable worlds, with the plan to evacuate Earth's population through artificial wormholes. The group realizes they were transported through one such wormhole to the remains of Earth, where they discovered the abandoned Ark XII. Polina theorizes that Earth's population successfully settled on Astra but concealed their origins. Aries advises focusing on returning home first. Upon arriving at the final planet, Galem, Kanata encounters another wormhole and barely escapes. Concluding the traitor will likely eliminate them on Galem to complete the journey alone, Kanata deduces the culprit's identity. He privately enlists Zack and Ulgar to stage a fake ambush, a ruse that successfully pressures Charce into confessing. Charce admits he is the traitor, revealing he has always known he is a clone of Noah Vix, the current king of Vixia.
11	"Confession"	September 11, 2019
Charce reveals he was created as a spare body for Noah and raised to believe that was his sole purpose. Tasked with eliminating the other clones after the Genome Control Act, he explains he halted his attempts because he refused to harm Aries, who is a clone of Seira—Noah's daughter and the princess of Vixia. He recounts how Seira, who helped raise him and opposed the cloning project, secretly had Aries smuggled out to live a normal life with Emma, one of Seira's handmaids. Seira was later assassinated, leaving Charce believing his mission was all he had left. Kanata challenges this, arguing that Charce's genuine friendships aboard the ship prove he has another purpose. As the crew urges him to reject Noah's control, Charce, overwhelmed by guilt, activates a backup wormhole controller to kill himself. Kanata charges forward, using his anti-gravity shoes to leap over the wormhole and tackle Charce, but loses his right arm in the process. This act shocks Charce back to his senses, and Kanata reminds him of his promise to serve as second-in-command on his future ship. Quitterie stops the bleeding, and Charce helps Kanata back to the Astra.
12	"Friend-Ship"	September 18, 2019
Forgiven by the group, Charce reveals the hidden history of Astra: it was settled by refugees from Earth using wormhole technology, a truth suppressed after a devastating war. As such, the true year is 2163. Determined to expose this and their parents' cloning conspiracy, they transmit their evidence from orbit. They are met by a fleet that has arrested their originals and Mark Vix, the noble responsible for assassinating Seira. Kanata and Charce later persuade the government to reveal the truth, with Kanata quelling public dissent through a bestselling book. Charce briefly becomes king of Vixia, abolishes its monarchy, and releases wormhole technology. Seven years later, the group has pursued diverse paths, and Kanata, with a prosthetic arm from Zack, fulfills his dream by purchasing the Astra and embarking on a new exploration mission with Zack and Charce, who is honoring his promise to serve as first officer.

== Reception ==
=== Manga ===
The manga was ranked fifth at the third Next Manga Awards in 2017 in the web category, it was also ranked third in the 2019 edition of Takarajimasha's Kono Manga ga Sugoi! guidebook, and won the twelfth Manga Taishō Awards. It was also nominated for the 23rd Tezuka Osamu Cultural Prize.

=== Anime ===
The anime adaptation won "Best Media" at the 51st Seiun Award during the 59th Nihon SF Taikai. Michele Liu, writing for Anime News Network, said that the anime series is "unique" because Luca is a main character who is born intersex rather than "altered by sci-fi space diseases or external influence," with Liu also describing Luca as bisexual.

The series' entry in The Encyclopedia of Science Fiction called it "is a rousing, absorbing anime, rich in core of tropes", although it observed that in "terms of characterization, the show relies on "somewhat clichéd gender roles and personalities." Ian Wolf of Anime UK News called the anime series "brilliant", praising its "thrilling plot, constant revelations, and engaging alien worlds." He noted that "while viewers must overlook some scientific inaccuracies and a weaker English dub," the series' compelling mix of high-stakes drama and memorable characters makes it "one of the best anime of recent years that deserves top marks."

Allen Moody of THEM Anime Reviews praised the show as the best "hard" sci-fi series he had seen in a long time, highlighting its strong pacing, vibrant color visuals, and coherent storytelling alongside a cast of interesting characters who overcome their traumatic upbringings. He noted a few minor deletions from the manga and criticized some "major plot holes and lapses of logic" regarding the believability of the backstory's central conspiracy, though he still considered the show rich in ideas and well-executed.
