= Makoto Fukami =

Japanese manga artist, novelist, and screenwriter

- 深見真
- Born: August 5, 1977 (age 49); Kumamoto Prefecture
- Occupations: Manga artist, novelist, and screenwriter
- Years active: 1999–present
- Known for: Psycho-Pass; Magical Girl Spec-Ops Asuka

Makoto Fukami (Japanese: 深見真, Hepburn: Fukami Makoto; born August 5, 1977) is a Japanese manga artist, novelist, and screenwriter. He started writing manga in 1999 and since has had multiple of his series adapted into other media. In addition to manga, he also did screenwriting for Psycho-Pass and its first film Psycho-Pass: The Movie in 2012 and 2015 respectively, both of which have been well received.

== Biography ==
Makoto Fukami was born in Kumamoto Prefecture on August 5, 1977. In 1999, Fukami created the manga Wild Diamond, which won the Famitsu Entertainment Award for manga in that year. In 2005, he launched his first major novel series, Young Gun Carnaval. In 2012, he started working as a screenwriter for various anime series with Psycho-Pass.

In 2013, the manga series The Torture Club received a live action film adaptation. Later that year, in the Newtype anime awards, Psycho-Pass was voted as fourth best title of the year. In 2014, the series was nominated for the Seiun Award. In 2015, Ōsama-tachi no Viking was nominated for the Manga Taishō. Later that year, Psycho-Pass: The Movie won the award for best film at the Newtype anime awards. For the movie, Fukami wanted the action scenes to be depicted as appealingly as possible. Fellow co-writer Gen Urobuchi praised Fukami's work in the movie as it helped to balance the script he originally wrote as well as give the casting enjoyable interactions. In 2019, Fukami once again worked in the franchise with Psycho-Pass 3. Lead writer Tow Ubukata wanted the two main characters to be written solely by Fukami. Fukami was surprised with the ongoing dynamic between Shiotani and Ubukata as despite the new story sharing a new cast, the series still felt like Psycho-Pass.

Psycho-Pass: The Movie was also nominated for the Seiun Award for best media and the Sugoi Japan Award for best animation. In 2019, Magical Girl Spec-Ops Asuka received an anime television series adaptation.

== Works ==
=== Manga ===
- The Torture Club (2011–2015; illustrated by Alpha Alf Layla)
- Ōsama-tachi no Viking (2013–2019; illustrated by Sadayasu)
- Magical Girl Spec-Ops Asuka (2015–2021; illustrated by Seigo Tokiya)
- Deep Insanity: Nirvana (2020–2023; co-written with Norimitsu Kaihō and illustrated by Etorouji Shiono)
- Succubus & Hitman (2020–present; illustrated by Seigo Tokiya)
- Takuaka! (2023–present; illustrated by Takuya Fujima)
- Police Tribe K-9 (2024–present; illustrated by Sai Natsuo)
- Mermaid Girls (2024–present; illustrated by Seigo Tokiya)

=== Novels ===
- Young Gun Carnaval (2005–2010; illustrated by Tow Fukino)
- Psycho-Pass (2013)
- Psycho-Pass: The Movie (2016)
- Berserk: The Flame Dragon Knight (2017; illustrated by Kentaro Miura)

=== Screenwriter ===
- series head writer denoted in bold

==== TV series ====
- **Psycho-Pass** (2012–2013)
- School-Live! (2015)
- **YuruYuri Nachuyachumi! +** (2015)
- **Yuruyuri San Hai!** (2015)
- **Berserk** (2016–2017)
- **Revisions** (2019)
- **Magical Girl Spec-Ops Asuka** (2019)
- Psycho-Pass 3 (2019)
- **Black Rock Shooter: Dawn Fall** (2022)
- **Heavenly Delusion** (2023)
- **Kinnikuman: Perfect Origin Arc** (2024)
- **Junket Bank** (TBA)

==== ONAs ====
- **Blade of the Immortal -Immortal-** (2019–2020)

==== Films ====
- Psycho-Pass: The Movie (2015)
- Resident Evil: Vendetta (2017)
- Psycho-Pass: Sinners of the System (2019)
  - Case 2: First Guardian
  - Case 3: On the Other Side of Love and Hate
- Resident Evil: Death Island (2023)
- Psycho-Pass Providence (2023)

==== Video games ====
- Shin Megami Tensei: Liberation Dx2 (2018; co-written with Kazuyuki Yamai)
