= Junket Bank =

Japanese manga series

- First tankōbon volume cover

ジャンケットバンク (Janketto Banku)
- Genre: Gambling
- Manga
- Written by: Ikkō Tanaka
- Published by: Shueisha
- English publisher: Shueisha (digital)
- Imprint: Young Jump Comics
- Magazine: Weekly Young Jump
- Original run: July 30, 2020 – present
- Volumes: 23
- Anime television series
- Directed by: Seiji Kishi
- Written by: Makoto Fukami
- Music by: Taku Iwasaki
- Studio: Cue
- Original network: TXN (TV Tokyo)
- icon

Junket Bank (Japanese: ジャンケットバンク, Hepburn: Janketto Banku) is a Japanese manga series written and illustrated by Ikkō Tanaka. It has been serialized in Shueisha's seinen manga magazine Weekly Young Jump since July 2020, with its chapters collected in 23 tankōbon volumes as of October 2026. An anime television series adaptation produced by Cue has been announced.

== Plot ==
Karasu Bank operates an exclusive underground casino where gamblers stake fortunes and lives in high-risk games. The Special Operations Department's Section 2 devises increasingly lethal gambling scenarios—higher ranks yield greater rewards but impose deadlier penalties. At the apex lies "1 Head", where defeat means certain death, followed by "1/2 Life", offering only marginal survival odds. The bank's Section 5 secures funding by inviting wealthy patrons to spectate. These sponsors finance the extravagant prizes while reveling in the spectacle of desperate players gambling with their lives.

== Characters ==
Shin Mafutsu (真経津 晨, Mafutsu Shin)
Voiced by: Soma Saito
Akira Mitarai (御手洗 暉, Mitarai Akira)
Voiced by: Rikuya Yasuda
Keiichi Shishigami (獅子神 敬一, Shishigami Keiichi)
Voiced by: Wataru Hatano
Reiji Murasame (村雨 礼二, Murasame Reiji)
Voiced by: Daisuke Hirakawa
Haruto Hinagata (雛形 春人, Hinagata Haruto)
Voiced by: Koki Uchiyama

== Media ==
=== Manga ===
Written and illustrated by Ikkō Tanaka, Junket Bank started in Shueisha's seinen manga magazine Weekly Young Jump on July 30, 2020. Shueisha has collected its chapters into individual tankōbon volumes. The first volume was released on November 19, 2020. As of October 19, 2026, 23 volumes have been released.

Shueisha began publishing the manga in English on its Manga Million digital platform in 2026.

==== Volumes ====
No.	Japanese release date	Japanese ISBN
1	November 19, 2020	978-4-08-891657-6
2	February 19, 2021	978-4-08-891830-3
3	May 19, 2021	978-4-08-891844-0
4	August 18, 2021	978-4-08-892048-1
5	November 19, 2021	978-4-08-892133-4
6	February 18, 2022	978-4-08-892220-1
7	May 18, 2022	978-4-08-892297-3
8	August 19, 2022	978-4-08-892402-1
9	November 17, 2022	978-4-08-892463-2
10	February 17, 2023	978-4-08-892620-9
11	May 19, 2023	978-4-08-892689-6
12	August 18, 2023	978-4-08-892791-6
13	November 17, 2023	978-4-08-893009-1
14	March 18, 2024	978-4-08-893120-3
15	June 19, 2024	978-4-08-893238-5
16	September 19, 2024	978-4-08-893376-4
17	December 18, 2024	978-4-08-893480-8
18	April 17, 2025	978-4-08-893585-0
19	August 19, 2025	978-4-08-893738-0
20	November 19, 2025	978-4-08-893879-0
21	March 18, 2026	978-4-08-894093-9
22	July 17, 2026	978-4-08-894271-1
23	October 19, 2026	978-4-08-894367-1

=== Anime ===
An anime television series adaptation was announced on March 12, 2026. The series will be produced by Cue and directed by Seiji Kishi, with Makoto Fukami handling series composition, Masanori Shino designing the characters, and Taku Iwasaki composing the music. It is set to premiere on TV Tokyo and its affiliates; it was originally scheduled for October 6, 2026. However, in September 2026, the series was indefinitely delayed due to production issues.

== Reception ==
The series ranked eighth in AnimeJapan's 2023 "Most Wanted Anime Adaptation" poll; the series ranked ninth in the 2025 edition.
