= Deep Insanity =

Japanese media franchise

- Cover of Deep Insanity: Nirvana volume 2 by Square Enix
- Created by: Square Enix
- Manga

Deep Insanity: Nirvana
- Written by: Norimitsu Kaihō; Makoto Fukami
- Illustrated by: Etorouji Shiono
- Published by: Square Enix
- Magazine: Monthly Big Gangan
- Original run: January 24, 2020 – March 25, 2023
- Volumes: 6
- Anime television series

Deep Insanity: The Lost Child
- Directed by: Shin Oonuma
- Produced by: Shouta Komatsu
- Written by: Kento Shimoyama
- Music by: Mirai Kodai Gakudan
- Studio: Silver Link
- Licensed by: Crunchyroll (Note: Formerly known as Funimation): SA/SEA: Medialink
- Original network: Tokyo MX, MBS, BS11, TVA, AT-X
- Original run: October 13, 2021 – December 29, 2021
- Episodes: 12
- Video game

Deep Insanity: Asylum
- Developer: Square Enix
- Publisher: Square Enix
- Genre: Action RPG
- Platform: Android, iOS, PC (Steam)
- Released: JP: October 14, 2021
- icon

Deep Insanity is a Japanese mixed-media project created by Square Enix. It consists of a manga titled Deep Insanity: Nirvana, which began serialization in Monthly Big Gangan from January 2020 to March 2023, a mobile and PC game titled Deep Insanity: Asylum, which was released on October 14, 2021, and an anime television series by Silver Link titled Deep Insanity: The Lost Child, which aired from October to December 2021.

== Plot ==
The action takes place in a world where a large part of the population has fallen into comas due to the mysterious illness called "Randolph Syndrome" during the outbreak of World War III. The illness is revealed to come from deep under the South Pole in a place called "Asylum" which leads people to explore this new land to discover a cure for the disease or to find what treasure this new land holds.

The manga follows a boy who is immune to the condition and a trader living in Antarctica who journey into Asylum. The anime is set between the manga and video game storylines and follows the young recruit Shigure Daniel Kai who joins "Sleepers" in exploring Asylum which is inhabited by monsters called "Scarred" and human "Exiles", some of which have been affected by the Randolph Syndrome and are referred to as "Cultists". The video game is set during the time when 540 million people lie in comas from Randolph syndrome and involve the sole survivor of a massacre that took place at a medical facility.

== Characters ==
=== Deep Insanity: Nirvana ===
Hildegard Olympiada Yamada (ヒルデガルド・オルインピアーダ・山田, Hirudegarudo Oruinpiāda Yamada)
The protagonist of the manga who is good at handling firearms and runs a store in Antarctica. She has a prosthetic right arm, so it can be used as a weapon.
Serge Sol (セルジュ・ソル, Seruju Soru)
A Sleeper who has a special resistance to Randolph Syndrome. While working on a hospital ship, he accidentally meets Yamada and together they go to Asylum in search of special items.

=== Deep Insanity: The Lost Child ===
==== Antarctica Front Platoon Unit 11 ====
Daniel Shigure Kai (時雨・ダニエル・魁, Shigure Danieru Kai)
Voiced by: Hiro Shimono (Japanese); Lee George (English)
New Sleeper recruit who hopes to become a hero. He is assigned to Antarctica Front Platoon Unit 11 where his skilled marksmanship becomes an asset to the group.
Vera Rustamova (ヴェーラ・ルスタモワ, Vēra Rusutamowa)
Voiced by: Ami Koshimizu (Japanese); Erica Schroeder (English)
Antarctica Front Platoon Unit 11 Commander who wields a huge scythe-like weapon and who appears to have the ability to make time repeat.
Leslie Blanc (レスリー・ブラン, Resurī Buran)
Voiced by: Kohsuke Toriumi (Japanese); Jessie James Grelle (English)
Platoon Unit 11 Executive Officer and leader in the field. He is the most experienced Sleeper on the team and is an excellent swordsman. He formerly dressed as a woman and was romantically involved with Hayden but is killed during a failed mission in the Abyss.
Lawrence "Larry" Jackson (ローレンス・ラリー・ジャクソン, Rōrensu Rarī Jakuson)
Voiced by: Yūya Hirose (Japanese); Matt Shipman (English)
Platoon Unit 11 Sleeper. Due to an accident, he has a prosthetic right arm and a brain injury which has left him with a complete lack of fear or the ability to feel pain.
Reika Kobato (小鳩玲香, Kobato Reika)
Voiced by: Ruriko Noguchi (Japanese); Morgan Lauré (English)
Platoon Unit 11 Sleeper. She has a prosthetic right leg and is an accomplished artist who is interested in manga and anime.
Sumire Motiki (餅木スミレ, Motiki Sumire)
Voiced by: Kaede Hondo (Japanese); Kate Bristol (English)
Platoon Unit 11 Sanity Anchor after failing to meet the Sleeper entrance criteria. A former pop idol who was exploited and is embarrassed about her past.

==== Other characters ====
James Chan (ジェームス・チャン, Jēmusu Chan)
Voiced by: Hiromichi Tezuka (Japanese); Alan Lee (English)
Konron Enterprises Antarctic Branch Chief.
Nicholas Kruger (ニコラス・クルーガー, Nikorasu kurūgā)
Voiced by: Takahiro Shimada (Japanese); Luis Bermudez (English)
Ararat Strategic Commander.
Solvy Sveien (ソールヴァイ・スヴェーエン, Sōruvuai Suvuēen)
Voiced by: Misa Ishii (Japanese); Natalie Van Sistine (English)
Antarctic Branch Chief.
Hayden (エイデン, Eiden)
Voiced by: Ryōta Suzuki
He works for an organization whose motives are unknown. He has a severe haircut with shaved sides and usually wears dark pointed tip sunglasses and is a former boyfriend of Leslie.
Nadia (ナディア)
Voiced by: Chitose Morinaga
She has the appearance of a young girl and wears a garland of small flowers in her hair. She works for Hayden and commands two blue, vicious, rabbit-like animals, Kamezou and Usazou, which she carries in a backpack.
El-Cee (Elsie) (エルシー, Erushī)
Voiced by: Takako Tanaka (Japanese); Courtney Meeker (English)
A young Exile girl living in an oasis area of the Asylum. She is viewed by Exile Cultists as the "Child of God" with the power to end the world and becomes the target of various groups in Antarctica for their own objectives.

=== Deep Insanity: Asylum ===
Wu Innominetas (ウー・イノミネタス, Ū Inominetasu)
Voiced by: Yūichirō Umehara
Morris Matsuo Fukuzawa (松尾・モリス・福沢, Matsuo Morisu Fukuzawa)
Voiced by: Kengo Kawanishi
Erika Makishi (真喜志エリカ, Makishi Erika)
Voiced by: Miyu Tomita
Manuela Rodriguez (マヌエラ・ロドリゲス, Manuera Rodorigesu)
Voiced by: Manami Numakura
Penthesilea (ペンテシレイア, Penteshireia)
Voiced by: Hina Kino
Jade Gabriel Ozon (ジェイド・ガブリエル・オゾン, Jeido Gaburieru Ozon)
Voiced by: Konomi Kohara
Maxine Kramer (マキシーン・クラーマー, Makishīn kurāmā)
Voiced by: Naomi Ōzora
Delia Goldilocks (デリア・ゴルディロックス, Deria Gōrudirokkusu)
Voiced by: Shizuka Itō
Very Bad Man (ベリー・バッドマン, Berī Baddoman)
Voiced by: Sarah Emi Bridcutt
Aristarkh (アリスタルフ, Arisutarufu)
Voiced by: Rikiya Koyama
Blake Loong (ブレイク・ロン, Bureiku Ron)
Voiced by: Yūki Ono
Alejandro Mendoza (アレハンドロ・メンドーサ, Arehandoro Mendōsa)
Voiced by: Hiroki Gotō
Fatima Sara (ファティマ・サラ, Fatima Sara)
Voiced by: Hiroko Kiso
Master Karateka (マスターカラテカ, Masutā Karateka)
Voiced by: Yasuhiro Mamiya

== Media ==
=== Manga ===
A manga series with story by Norimitsu Kaihō and Makoto Fukami and art by Etorouji Shiono titled Deep Insanity: Nirvana has been serialized in Square Enix's seinen manga magazine Monthly Big Gangan from January 24, 2020, to March 25, 2023. The first two tankōbon volumes of the manga were released on September 25, 2021.

No.	Japanese release date	Japanese ISBN
1	September 25, 2021	978-4-7575-7440-3
2	September 25, 2021	978-4-7575-7441-0
3	November 25, 2021	978-4-7575-7587-5
4	March 25, 2022	978-4-7575-7845-6
5	May 25, 2023	978-4-7575-8586-7
6	May 25, 2023	978-4-7575-8587-4

=== Anime ===
An anime television series by Silver Link titled Deep Insanity: The Lost Child aired from October 13 to December 29, 2021, on Tokyo MX, MBS, BS11, TVA, and AT-X. (Note: Tokyo MX lists the series premiere at 24:30 on October 12, 2021, which is effectively 12:30 a.m. JST on October 13.) Shin Oonuma directed the series, with Kento Shimoyama handling series' composition, Kazuyuki Yamayoshi designing the characters, and Mirai Kodai Gakudan composing the series' music. The opening theme is "Inochi no Tomoshibi" (Light of Life) by Konomi Suzuki while the ending theme is "Shinjuiro no Kakumei" (Pearl Gray Revolution) by Kashitarō Itō. Crunchyroll (formerly Funimation) licensed the series outside of Asia for an English simulcast and simuldub. Medialink licensed the series in Asia-Pacific (except Australia and New Zealand); they are streaming it on their Ani-One Asia YouTube channel and Bilibili.

==== Episodes ====
No.	Title	Directed by	Written by	Storyboarded by	Original release date
1	"take 01"	Yūsuke Sekine	Kento Shimoyama	Shin Ōnuma, Gōichi Iwahata	October 13, 2021
A rescue team searches the forest in the area of Asylum in Antarctica for missing members of their group and finds a survivor apparently sleeping. However, he has been infected by Randolph Syndrome and changes into a monster, and attacks the team. At Research City Southern Cross in southern Australia, Shigure Daniel Kai is one of the applicants for a job as a "Sleeper" for Arctic Front in Asylum, hoping to become a hero. At the Arctic Front base in Asylum, Commander Kruger, Chief Solvy Sveien Grasse Bea, and Commander Vera Rustamova approve Daniel's application and appoint him to Platoon Unit 11 with the Sleepers Sumire, Reika and Larry. He goes on his first mission with Leslie Blanc, Larry, and Reika, monitored back at the base by the Sanity Anchor Sumire Motiki. Sumire detects a magnetic field distortion, and a "Scarred" appears, a huge animal similar to those found on the surface, but mutated by some unknown factor in the Asylum. The Sleepers attack and defeat it with their advanced weapons, but Daniel fails to act. They are called on to assist the rescue team being attacked by the transformed member affected by the Randolph Syndrome. Daniel finally rises to the challenge and helps Leslie destroy the monster.
2	"take 02"	Kōki Onoue	Kento Shimoyama	Kōji Sawai	October 20, 2021
While still out on patrol, Sleeper Platoon Unit 11 comes under attack by another Scarred monster, this time from below the sand. Sumire Motiki uses her instruments to detect when the monster will next appear and orders Daniel to fire, but he widely misses the mark. Back at the base Sumire heavily criticizes Daniel's poor performance, leaving him wondering what his talent really is. During clean-up duty, Daniel discovers that Sumire was formerly a pop idol, but she refuses to talk about it. Later he apologizes to her for raising the issue and acknowledges his own failings. Soon Platoon Unit 11 is given orders to deal with the same Scarred, but this time they use a different strategy, with Larry as bait and they successfully kill it. After the operation, Sumire admits to Daniel that she became a Sanity Anchor because she did not qualify to be a Sleeper. Later, Commander Vera offers Daniel a mission involving an assassination.
3	"take 03"	Misuzu Hoshino	Kento Shimoyama	Yō★Nakano	October 27, 2021
A leader is shown giving a speech where he suggests that although Randolph Syndrome may devastate humanity, it also presents opportunities. Larry invites Daniel on a trip to the town where they encounter thugs beating on a young dealer. After they save him, the dealer asks if they can collect seeds from the Vista Pazza tree which grows in the Asylum. Larry agrees and persuades Daniel to accompany him on a clandestine sortie into an area of the Asylum which is like an oasis. While there, they encounter one of the exiles who leads them to a Vista Pazza tree. Larry reveals to Daniel that he wants to explore the Asylum himself, hoping to learn more about Randolph Syndrome. Suddenly they are attacked by a flying Scarred which seems to be after the exile girl who is called El-Cee. Daniel acts as a decoy so that El-Cee can escape, but he and Larry are cornered by the monster. Fortunately, Leslie and the rest of Sleeper Platoon Unit 11 arrive to rescue them, but back at the base, they are severely reprimanded for going AWOL. The experience convinces Daniel that he should take the assassination mission offered by Commander Vera, however, he then discovers that the target is El-Cee.
4	"take 04"	Nobutaka Chikahashi	Kento Shimoyama	Miyana Okita	November 3, 2021
On their next mission into Asylum, Sleeper Platoon Unit 11 encounters an exile and Leslie fights it off with their excellent sword fighting skills but afterward admonishes the others for not helping out. Later, the rest of the team wonders about Leslie's past and they track down some old images of Leslie together with Vera. Leslie invites Daniel out for a drink, but Daniel is lured out and then ambushed by three Cultist Exiles. When Leslie goes out to help, Leslie is confronted by Hayden, an old associate who is after Daniel. Leslie tells Daniel to escape, but the youth is cornered by a young girl called Nadia, commanding two vicious rabbit-like animals. Daniel escapes from them and returns to help Leslie who has been shot in the arm. It appears that Hayden knows about Daniel's mission to kill El-Cee as he is intent on capturing her himself.
5	"take 05"	Jun'ya Koshiba	Kento Shimoyama	Jin Tamamura	November 10, 2021
Sleeper Platoon Unit 11 are again challenged by a Cultist, but before the others can fire, Daniel accurately shoots and destroys it. Hayden reports to his superior who savagely beats him for failing to capture Daniel, inferring that he would not fight his former lover Leslie, and orders Hayden to capture El-Cee at any cost. Meanwhile, Platoon Unit 11 members discuss how to get Daniel and Reika Kobato to work together when Daniel always appears to be awkward around her. They decide to have a team BBQ and send Daniel and Reika shopping together for food. The pair encounter Nadia who sets her rabbit-like animals onto Daniel and are then attacked by a Scarred of human appearance. Despite initially trying to act independently, Daniel and Reika eventually cooperate to kill the monster and discover later that they share a common interest in anime.
6	"take 06"	Yūsuke Sekine	Kento Shimoyama	Kōji Sawai	November 17, 2021
Vera meets with Nicholas Kruger who gives permission for the El-Cee mission to proceed. Platoon Unit 11 prepares for its mission with only Leslie and Daniel knowing its true objective is to assassinate El-Cee. Before they leave, Vera gives Leslie an engraved ring and a silver necklace for good luck. Meanwhile, a celebration to honor El-Cee as the "Child of God" begins in a grand mansion in the Exile village of Ruois. Leslie leads Platoon Unit 11 into the village where his plan is to lead El-Cee to a window where Daniel can shoot her, and he gives Daniel a note in case they become separated. Leslie, Larry, and Reika infiltrate the party dressed as servants, but their presence is detected by Hayden who subdues Larry and attacks Leslie. Leslie escapes and notifies Vera that their plan was leaked, but she refuses to call off the mission. Reika manages to lure El-Cee to a window by setting off a fireworks display, but Daniel hesitates to pull the trigger. Instead, he saves Leslie instead by shooting off Hayden's arm thus thwarting the mission. The Sleepers flee, however they are pursued by a spider mech. Leslie lures it away, but just as he successfully defeats it, Hayden shoots Leslie's flying device with a sniper rifle causing him to fall into a smoke-filled abyss.
7	"take 07"	Yūta Maruyama	Kento Shimoyama	Hiromitsu Kanazawa	November 24, 2021
Leslie's body is retrieved for burial, but Vera seems uninterested. Meanwhile, Hayden reenters the mansion in Ruois and takes the guests hostage in an attempt to capture El-Cee who was earlier taken to safety with Master Karateka. Daniel offers to help pack up Leslie's belongings and after Vera tells Daniel that the plan is still going ahead, Daniel searches for the good luck charm Vera gave Leslie before the mission, but he cannot find it. Platoon Unit 11 is given a new mission into Ruois, and this time Vera leads them. They arrive at the mansion which is now deserted but Vera finds the ring she gave Leslie. They encounter the villagers who have been released, but who are now under attack from many Scarred. The platoon opens fire, but Vera is much more effective when she attacks the monsters with a Scythe-like weapon. After being rescued, chief Jiryo shows Vera their sacred ruby-colored pyramid crystal containing a ring which was to be given to El-Cee at the ceremony. He gives it to Vera after she offers to take the treasure to El-Cee. When the platoon returns to base, Daniel tells Vera that agrees to proceed with the plan to assassinate El-Cee.
8	"take 08"	Misuzu Hoshino	Kento Shimoyama	Yō★Nakano	December 1, 2021
Following Vera's failed mission to kill El-Cee, she is reprimanded by the Antarctica Front Steering Committee and warned not to jeopardize the organization. Daniel questions Leslie's waitress friend about the note Leslie gave him in the village of Ruois which contains a set of numbers. Meanwhile, Ron Blake and his team who are guarding El-Cee split up to make it more difficult for Hayden to capture her. While looking at Leslie's collection of photos, Daniel enters the set of numbers on the note which retrieves a photo taken on a Platoon Unit 11 mission, but the location is unclear. Later, on the next Platoon Unit 11 sortie into the Abyss, Vera leads Daniel to a spot where he can shoot El-Cee, and he recognizes it as the location shown in Leslie's photo. There he finds the silver necklace from Vera and Leslie's notebook, including a note, addressed to his potential successor. All three groups, the Cultist Exiles, Hayden, and Platoon Unit 11, come under attack from Scarred while fighting each other and trying to achieve their own objectives. Eventually, El-Cee remains in the hands of the hands of "Iceman" who is aware that Vera has the power to make time repeat.
9	"take 09"	Nobutaka Chikahashi	Kento Shimoyama	Kōji Sawai	December 8, 2021
Vera is again called before the Steering Committee and warned that it is her third and last chance to succeed. She reviews her current situation; the Iceman recognizes that she has the power to make time repeat and although she selected Daniel because of his sniping ability he is still immature. Daniel requests a meeting with Vera and she suspects that he wants to withdraw from the mission and is prepared to agree, however when he asks her to join the others in a BBQ, she blurts out "yes" and immediately regrets it. The team arranges it so that she has little opportunity to avoid attending by taking control of her schedule. On the pretext of buying food, Daniel visits the Asylum to read Leslie's notebook and find out more about El-Cee, but still returns in time with the food. Vera is late for the BBQ but she does join the team for the social occasion, however, she later tells Daniel that she is removing him from the platoon.
10	"Re:take"	Kōki Onoue	Kento Shimoyama	Kubo Shiba	December 15, 2021
Daniel awakes from a dream with his suitcases packed to leave. He is called before the Steering Committee who says that he was removed from duty because of his unauthorized entry into the Asylum. Daniel joins the platoon for farewell drinks, but after being pressed for details about his intentions, he goes out for air. He finds Vera's associate who is dying after being shot by Nadia and he tells Daniel that Vera has been set up to get the Aruka ring. Nadia assists Hayden to locate Vera and obtain the ring he is looking for. Hayden wounds Vera and reveals that he knows that Vera has repeated the El-Cee assassination mission a number of times, but it has always resulted in Leslie's death. Daniel suddenly appears and disarms him, but Hayden escapes with the ring after setting off a series of diversionary explosions. Vera then gives Daniel the ruby-colored pyramid crystal, the Acura, which has a secret power while she had successfully convinced Hayden that the power was in the ring. Daniel prepares to fly out to Argentina but returns to headquarters and finds Vera and the others out on a mission in the Asylum. He tracks them down to a church and finds them all dead, but then again wakes up in his room with his suitcases packed beside him.
11	"Revolution"	Jun'ya Koshiba	Kento Shimoyama	Kubo Shiba	December 22, 2021
Daniel feels that he is re-living recent events; he goes out again for farewell drinks with the platoon, but modifies his actions which slightly alter the events during which he meets Vera's agent, travels to the Asylum and encounters Hayden and Iceman, where Larry and Reika fail to kill El-Cee who transforms into a monstrous Scarred killing everyone. He gradually comes to the realization that since Very gave him the Acura crystal he has had the power to repeat events, and that Vera's obsession to kill El-Cee and prevent the 6th Great Extinction is an attempt to kill her younger self. The final reenactment of this series of events leads to the complete destruction of the Antarctic base in an eruption of fire. However, Daniel again wakes up in his room and realizes that Vera has experienced these events many times before and is desperate to stop the cycle from repeating itself.
12	"Resolution"	Yūsuke Sekine	Kento Shimoyama	Kōji Sawai	December 29, 2021
Daniel explains how the Acura gives him the ability to repeat time to his comrades, and they join him to defeat Nadia and Hayden who then throws himself off the top of the building. Daniel then confronts Vera with the knowledge that she is the future El-Cee, who has been vainly trying to kill the young version of herself to prevent anyone from obtaining her destructive power. Platoon Unit 11 heads into the Abyss to prevent Iceman from merging with El-Cee, and Vera joins them. Iceman begins the process, but the transformation is incomplete and he becomes an unstable tentacled monster. He grabs Vera to prevent her from dying and repeating the past events, unaware that Daniel now has that ability. In a last-ditch attempt to break the cycle, Daniel thrusts the Acura into the center of the beast, destroying it, but not before his body is pierced by multiple spikes, fatally wounding him. However, El-Cee is released and he passes the Acura back to Vera. As he dies and fades from existence, his essence is transferred into the crystal leading Vera to believe that he will return in the future.

=== Game ===
A mobile and PC game titled Deep Insanity: Asylum was released on October 14, 2021, in Japan. The game is a free-to-play RPG genre title with in-app purchases. Game combat is skills-based, is done in "real time", and features auto and high speed combat options. A preview of the game was released for Android phones on July 2, 2021, in Japan. The game ended service on October 31, 2022.

=== Social media ===
An interactive social media game depicting the account of a reporter trapped in a hospital during a disaster is assisted by other social media users who can help guide her to safety ran from July 9 to 30, 2021, on Twitter.
