= Etorouji Shiono =

Japanese manga artist

Etorouji Shiono 塩野干支郎次
- Born: September 16, 1976 (age 50) Nagano Prefecture
- Area: Manga artist
- Notable works: Übel Blatt
- Awards: 2008 Japan Expo Award in the seinen category

Etorouji Shiono (Japanese: 塩野干支郎次, Hepburn: Shiono Etorōji; born September 16, 1976) is a Japanese manga artist. After debuting in 2003, he launched Übel Blatt in the following year, which saw success internationally and won the Japan Expo Award in the seinen category in 2008. Starting in 2020, he did the illustrations for Deep Insanity: Nirvana.

== Biography ==
Etorouji Shiono was born in Nagano Prefecture on September 16, 1976. He debuted as a manga artist in 2003 with Brocken Blood. In 2004, he launched Übel Blatt, which ran until 2015. The series did very well, especially in France where at one point it was ranked as one of the top 15 manga in the country. The series was also awarded the Japan Expo Award in 2008 in the seinen category. Starting in 2020, Shiono did the illustrations for Deep Insanity: Nirvana, a manga for Square Enix's Deep Insanity multimedia franchise.

== Works ==
- Brocken Blood (ブロッケンブラッド) (2003–2012) (serialized in Young King)
- Necossass Six (ネコサスシックス, Nekosasu Shikkusu) (2003) (serialized in Magi-Cu)
- Übel Blatt (ユーベルブラット, Yūberu Buratto) (2004–2019) (serialized in Young Gangan and Monthly Big Gangan)
- Celestial Clothes (セレスティアルクローズ) (2010–2016) (serialized in Monthly Shōnen Sirius)
- Zelphy of the Aion (この人類域のゼルフィー, Jinruiiki no Zelphy) (2012–2015) (serialized in Young King Ours GH)
- Winged Mermaids (ウイングドマーメイズ) (2015–2017) (serialized in Young King Ours GH)
- Punipuni to Sarasara (プニプニとサラサラ) (2017–2019) (serialized in Young King Ours GH)
- Deep Insanity: Nirvana (2020–present) (serialized in Monthly Big Gangan; story by Norimitsu Kaihō and Makoto Fukami)
- Shachō, Koibito no Furi o Shite Watashi no Chichi ni Atte Kudasai (社長、恋人のフリをして私の父に会ってください。) (2020–2021) (serialized in Young King Ours GH)
