= Magical Girl Spec-Ops Asuka =

Japanese manga series

- First tankōbon volume cover

魔法少女特殊戦あすか (Mahō Shōjo Tokushusen Asuka)
- Genre: Action, magical girl, military
- Manga
- Written by: Makoto Fukami
- Illustrated by: Seigo Tokiya
- Published by: Square Enix
- English publisher: NA: Seven Seas Entertainment
- Magazine: Monthly Big Gangan
- Original run: June 12, 2015 – February 25, 2021
- Volumes: 14
- Anime television series
- Directed by: Hideyo Yamamoto
- Produced by: Noritomo Isogai; Hiroshi Kamei; Shouta Komatsu; Shintarou Yoshitake; Atsushi Tsunoda
- Written by: Makoto Fukami; Norimitsu Kaihō
- Music by: R.O.N
- Studio: Liden Films
- Licensed by: NA: Crunchyroll Funimation
- Original network: JNN (MBS, TBS, BS-TBS, CBC), AT-X
- Original run: January 12, 2019 – March 30, 2019
- Episodes: 12
- icon

Magical Girl Spec-Ops Asuka (Japanese: 魔法少女特殊戦あすか, Hepburn: Mahō Shōjo Tokushusen Asuka) is a Japanese magical girl/military manga series written by Makoto Fukami and illustrated by Seigo Tokiya. Naoya Tamura is the series' military advisor. It was serialized in Square Enix's seinen manga magazine Monthly Big Gangan from June 2015 to February 2021, with its chapters collected in fourteen tankōbon volumes. The series is published in North America by Seven Seas Entertainment.

An anime television series adaptation produced by Liden Films aired from January to March 2019; the anime series is licensed in North America under Crunchyroll-Funimation partnership.

== Plot ==
When a dangerous race of beasts known as the Disas attacked, spirits from another world formed an alliance with Earth and granted certain girls the power to become magical girls to fight against them. Three years after the war against the Disas, one of the magical girls, Asuka Otori, is trying to return to living a normal life. However, Disas Bears reappear from an unknown source, leading Asuka to come out of retirement and join a squadron of magical girls to fight this new threat.

== Characters ==
The Magical Five being briefed in the war against the Disas

=== Magical Five ===
Originally, a squadron of 11 magical girls which took part in the war with the Disas. The Legendary Five represents the survivors of that war. The squad's motto was: "Who laughs last, laughs best..."
Asuka Otori (大鳥居あすか, Ōtorii Asuka) / Rapture Asuka (ラプチャー☆あすか, Rapuchā Asuka)
Voiced by: Aya Suzaki (Japanese); Trina Nishimura (English)
The former leader of the magical girls who fought against the Disas three years ago. She tries to live a normal life to get over her trauma of the war, including her parents' death at the hands of the Disas, but is dragged back into the fray by the new threat. Her magical device is a karambit which can be extended to a sword that can cut through any magical defense at the cost of a lot of magic power.
Kurumi Mugen (夢源くるみ, Mugen Kurumi) / War Nurse Kurumi (ウォーナース☆くるみ, Wō Nāsu Kurumi)
Voiced by: Akira Sekine (Japanese); Sara Ragsdale (English)
Asuka's close friend who is attached to the General Research Division #2 as a Magical Warfare Research Officer. She is able to heal wounds and use a giant syringe to poison enemies. She holds a strong attachment to Asuka who saved her from severe bullying, to the point of unstable obsession, which she mostly keeps to herself while trying to win over Asuka in an acceptable way. She hates the team's moniker of "Magical Five" as it means the public fails to realize that the team was once much bigger and the "Magical Five" are only the survivors of the war. Despite her title as a "Medic", she is also an interrogation specialist well-versed in the practice of torture.
Mia Cyrus (ミア・サイラス, Mia Sairasu) / Just Cause Mia (ジャストコーズ☆ミア, Jasuto Kōzu Mia)
Voiced by: Eriko Matsui (Japanese); Emily Neves (English)
An American Sergeant Major with Joint Special Operations Command (JSOC), who works alongside military intelligence agents ISA Aaron and ISA Julia. She is so far the only magical girl who revealed her identity to the public. Her magical device is a derringer, which can turn into different guns. She is at odds with Tamara for being too serious, referring to her as "Rusky".
Tamara Volkova (タマラ・ヴォルコワ, Tamara Vorukowa) / Phoenix Tamara (フェーニクス☆タマラ, Fēnikusu Tamara)
Voiced by: M.A.O (Japanese); Katelyn Barr (English)
A Russian who specializes in wide-area suppression, she has a magical lighter that can turn into a flamethrower, thus her "Phoenix" moniker. She is at odds with Mia for being too laid back, calling her "Texas girl". She serves as a magical girl because of her sister, later revealed to be an illusion the Russian general staff at the Zavolzhsky weapons testing site use with a fantasy-granting device to brainwash Tamara with the intent to use her until she dies in battle.
Lau Peipei (ラウ・ペイペイ, Rau Peipei) / Shantoulon Peipei (双頭竜ペイペイ, Shontōron Peipei)
Voiced by: Yoko Hikasa (Japanese); Amber Lee Connors (English)
China's Two Headed Dragon, a Chinese who fights using magical nunchaku and is currently keeping a low profile. She is now a freelance mercenary living in Thailand and has changed her appearance through plastic surgery. She is aware of the recent events and laments that she could not fight alongside her teammates, but has no intention of joining them.
Sacchuu (サッチュウ, Sacchū)
Voiced by: Kokoro Kikuchi (Japanese); Lara Woodhull (English)
A mouse-class fairy who works alongside Asuka and the other magical girls. Sacchuu can link senses with other magical girls and analyze enemies. His primary weapon is spiked brass knuckles but has also used a pistol and grenades.
Chevalier Francine (シュバリエ☆フランシーヌ, Shubarie Furansīnu)
Voiced by: Aya Hisakawa (Japanese); Caitlin Glass (English)
Asuka's former commander and a Magical Girl from France. She was killed during the War with the Disas; passing on leadership to Asuka before succumbing to her injuries.

=== Babel Brigade ===
A mysterious organization and terrorist cell who have allied with the Disas against humanity. At least two are illegal magical girls in the organization.
Brigadier (旅団長（ブリガディア）, Burigadia)
Voiced by: Yumi Hara
A masked Magical Girl and the leader of the Babel Brigade terrorist cell. She is regularly called Queen by her subordinates. She has a resemblance to someone Asuka knows. It is later revealed that it was Francine, who had somehow survived. She is killed in a suicide attack by Mia Cyrus.
Abigail (アビゲイル, Abigeiru) / Pick Scissors Abby (ピックシザーズ☆アビー, Pikku Shizāzu Abī)
Voiced by: Ayahi Takagaki (Japanese); Tia Ballard (English)
A terrorist Magical Girl who kidnaps Asuka's friend, Nozomi, to lure other Magical Girls to her. She also is a weapons dealer and assassin. Her magical device is a pair of scissors, which grows massive after she transforms. The weapon can separate and act as a pair of swords. Thematically, she is a darker mirror of Kurumi, obsessively devoted to the Brigadier and similarly fond of using torture.
Giess (ギース, Gīsu)
Voiced by: Yuka Terasaki (Japanese); Mikaela Krantz (English)
A massive cyborg who was formerly a Somali child soldier who was severely injured in battle. He was rescued by Brigadier and Abigail and augmented with a cybernetic body, made to kill Magical Girls. He is responsible for giving Chisato her new leg and turning her into a Magical Girl. He was killed by Asuka during the battle at the 6th Naha.

=== Other characters ===
Yoshiaki Iizuka (飯塚 義明, Iizuka Yoshiaki)
Voiced by: Kenji Nomura (Japanese); Christopher R. Sabat (English)
A colonel of the JGSDF who heads up the Magical Girl Operations Development Unit; M-Squad for short. The M-Squad is an anti–magic task force which poses as a Maid Café. He is Asuka's legal guardian.
Sayako Hata (羽田 紗綾子, Hata Sayako)
Voiced by: Chinami Hashimoto (Japanese); Bryn Apprill (English)
Asuka's civilian classmate who is close friends with Nozomi. She was nearly shot by Kim Kanth, which prompted Asuka to return to being a Magical Girl to save her. She is kidnapped by the Babel Brigade and transformed into a new illegal magical girl, under the name Sehkmet. She died after being separated from the Ring of Ouroboros, which was holding her magic power in check, causing her body to turn to ash. At the end of the manga, however, she is revived by Asuka's hidden revival magic. In the anime, Sayako remains alive and well, and is never converted into an illegal magical girl unlike the manga.
Nozomi Makino (牧野 希美, Makino Nozomi)
Voiced by: Rie Takahashi (Japanese); Morgan Berry (English)
Asuka's bubbly and cheerful civilian classmate and Sayako's friend. Her father works for the Public Safety branch of the police.
Akinori Makino (牧野 晃教, Makino Akinori)
Voiced by: Takuya Kirimoto
Nozomi's father who works for the Public Safety intelligence office and will interrogate – torture – suspects for information.
Sena Miura (三浦 瀬奈, Miura Sena)
Voiced by: Chiaki Takahashi
The firm and cold Commissioner of Public Safety, a woman with wavy brown-red hair and brown eyes. When Nozomi was kidnapped, her superiors refused to mobilize her people as they weren't equipped to handle a magical threat and would not request assistance from JSDF's M-Squad as they believed Nozomi's death could be used politically to secure additional funding without indebting themselves to the armed forces. Working around this, she unofficially partners with Colonel Iizuka since they both know that the Magical Girls are the loophole to this political mess.
Kim Kanth (キム・カンス, Kimu Kansu)
Voiced by: Satoshi Tsuruoka
The leader of the East Asia United Front terrorist group that orchestrated a massacre in Iidabashi.
Nazani (ナーズィニー, Nāzinī)
Voiced by: Shizuka Ishigami (Japanese); Sarah Wiedenheft (English)
A young Armenian witch hired by a Russian mafia as protection while they illegally traded for magical items. She has a magical item that lets her throw fireballs. She was defeated by Asuka and later interrogated and tortured by Kurumi, who starts treating her like a dog. She and Chisato are recruited to be traded to Commissioner Miura for her newly-created magical response force and are given magical collars that prevent betrayal.
Chisato Yonamine (与那嶺 ちさと, Yonamine Chisato) / Whiplash Chisato (ウィップラッシュ☆ちさと, Wippurasshu Chisato)
Voiced by: Ayana Taketatsu (Japanese); Alexis Tipton (English)
An Okinawan girl who used to be a karate student before losing her leg in an accident that also killed her divorced mother. Her biological father tried to offer her to the sex industry for money by revenge. She eventually becomes a Magical Girl for Babel Brigade and is given a new prosthetic leg. Her magical device is a bracelet that turns into a whip or bandage around her hand to increase the strength of her blows. It is later revealed Babel was behind the car accident as they could sense her magical potential and wanted to stress her enough to make her into a Magical Girl that would join them. She is captured by Kurumi and eventually joins Miura's new squad along with Nazani and are given magical collars that prevent betrayal.

=== Disas ===
Throughout the series various types of disas appear. While they usually have characteristics of stuffed animals stronger ones resemble slasher movie icons. Their danger classes pay homage to many horror villains like Jason Voorhees and Michael Myers.

== Media ==
=== Manga ===
Makoto Fukami and Seigo Tokiya began publishing the series in Square Enix's Monthly Big Gangan in February 2015. The series was licensed in English by Seven Seas Entertainment in January 2017.

Fourteen tankōbon volumes have been released as of April 2021 in Japan. Ten volumes have been released in English so far.

No.	Original release date	Original ISBN	English release date	English ISBN
1	October 24, 2015	978-4-757-54780-3	November 28, 2017	978-1-626926-46-2
Mission 1. Magical Five; Mission 2. The Force of the Magical Girl; Mission 3. Another One of the Magical Girls
2	March 25, 2016	978-4-757-54934-0	February 20, 2018	978-1-626927-38-4
Mission 4. Illegal Magical Girl; Mission 5. Prisoner Abuse; Mission 6. Engage; Mission 7. Mighty Talon; Mission 8. Magic Squad
3	July 15, 2016	978-4-757-55065-0	July 31, 2018	978-1-626927-88-9
Mission 9. Cube; Mission 10. Dream and Reality; Mission 11. American Heroine; Mission 12. Bloody strategy
4	April 25, 2017	978-4-757-55298-2	September 25, 2018	978-1-626928-62-6
Mission 13. You are definitely becoming a lovely Magical Girl; Mission 14. Whiplash; Mission 15. To the ready; Mission 16–17. Fight for Life Part 1–2
5	July 25, 2017	978-4-757-55423-8	January 29, 2019	978-1-626929-72-2
Mission 18–22. Fight for Life Part 3–7
6	November 25, 2017	978-4-757-55535-8	April 15, 2019	978-1-642751-08-6
Mission 23. Fight for Life Part 8; Mission 24. Bitter Victory; Mission 25. Summer; Mission 26. Festival
7	March 24, 2018	978-4-757-55680-5	September 17, 2019	978-1-642756-99-9
Mission 27. Broken Arrow; Mission 28. Trust; Mission 29. Magical Girl and Panzer; Mission 30. Steel Storm
8	July 25, 2018	978-4-757-55793-2	December 3, 2019	978-1-642757-40-8
Mission 31. Bad communication; Mission 32. Resurrection; Mission 33–34. Dragon Slayer Part 1–2
9	December 25, 2018	978-4-757-55962-2	July 7, 2020	978-1-64505-453-5
Mission 35. Shock and Awe; Mission 36. Deep Diver; Mission 37. Brainwash; Mission 38. The Raid
10	March 25, 2019	978-4-757-55962-2	October 27, 2020	978-1-64505-763-5
Mission 39. Beautiful; Mission 40–42. Saving Phoenix Tamara Part 1–3
11	October 25, 2019	978-4-757-56360-5	June 22, 2021	978-1-64827-106-9
Mission 43. Drastic Treatment; Mission 44. Girls' Life; Mission 45. Carrot and Stick; Mission 46. Beginning of the End; Mission 47. Surprise Attack
12	March 25, 2020	978-4-757-56579-1	October 12, 2021	978-1-64827-121-2
Mission 48-50. Fierce Battle Part 1-3; Mission 51. Resurrection Part 1
13	September 25, 2020	978-4-757-56855-6	March 22, 2022	978-1-63858-133-8
Mission 52-55. Resurrection Part 2-5; Mission 56. Breakthrough to Utopia
14	April 24, 2021	978-4-757-57222-5	May 10, 2022	978-1-63858-233-5
Mission 57-60. Climax Part 1-4; Mission 61. I Want to Gome Home With You; Last Mission. Finally, smile.; Confidential File No.00

=== Anime ===
Logo of the anime

An anime television series adaptation was announced on July 20, 2018. The anime series is directed by Hideyo Yamamoto and animated by Liden Films, with Makoto Fukami and Norimitsu Kaihō writing the scripts, Yoko Suzuki designing the characters and R.O.N composing the music. It aired from January 12 to March 30, 2019, on MBS and TBS before airing later on BS-TBS, AT-X, CBC. The opening theme is "Kodo" by Nonoc and the ending theme is "Rebel Flag" by Garnidelia. Crunchyroll streamed the series, while Funimation produced an English dub. In Australia and New Zealand, the series is simulcasting on AnimeLab.

No.	Title	Written by	Original release date
1	"The Magical Girl Comes Back"; Transliteration: "Kaette Kita Mahō Shōjo" (Japanese: 帰ってきた魔法少女)	Norimitsu Kaihō	January 12, 2019
Asuka Otori, aka Magical Girl Rapture Asuka, is a magical girl who fought in a brutal war against the evil Disas race three years ago and was instrumental in their defeat. As Asuka tries to live a normal life at a new school, JGSDF member Yoshiaki Iizuka asks her to resume her duties as a magical girl as part of a special operations squad, but Asuka refuses due to the trauma from the war. While Asuka befriends her classmates, Nozomi Makino and Sayako Hata, a group of terrorists free their comrade, Kim Kanth, from a police truck, attacking innocent bystanders as they make their escape. When Sayako gets caught up in the danger, Asuka once again becomes a magical girl to protect her and stop the terrorists.
2	"Daily Life and Comrades in Arms"; Transliteration: "Nichijō to Sen'yū" (Japanese: 日常と戦友)	Norimitsu Kaihō	January 19, 2019
Following the incident, Kanth is taken in by the Metropolitan Police, who interrogate him for information, while Asuka continues to reject Iizuka's offer. Sayako struggles with trauma from nearly being killed. Asuka learns of a nearby Disas attack and rushes to the aid of her fellow magical girl, Kurumi Mugen aka War Nurse. After rekindling their friendship, Kurumi transfers into Asuka's class.
3	"A More Terrible War"; Transliteration: "Motto Hidoi Sensō" (Japanese: もっとひどい戦争)	Norimitsu Kaihō	January 26, 2019
In Tijuana, Mexico, as Mia Cyrus aka Just Cause Mia heads up a renegade squad to take down a drug cartel, she comes across a tied up man who mentions "The Babel Brigade" before he is crushed to death by a magical force. Back in Japan, Nozomi's father, who works for the Metropolitan Police's Public Safety Division, gets similar information out of Kanth, who warns the magical girls are prey. Later, Nozomi invites everyone to the pool, where Sayako jumps off the high dive to overcome her trauma. They then buy movie tickets with the promise to meet up the next day to watch the movie together. Later that night, however, Nozomi is kidnapped by the illegal magical girl Abigail.
4	"Babel Brigade – Combat Begins"; Transliteration: "Baberu Ryodan – Kōsen Kaishi" (Japanese: バベル旅団-交戦開始)	Ukyō Kodachi	February 2, 2019
Public Safety learns about Nozomi's kidnapping, but refuses to act since they are not equipped to handle magical threats. Rather than request assistance from the JSDF, they believe Nozomi's death can be used as a political tool to secure additional funding. Iizuka informs Asuka of the situation, and she and Kurumi decide to rescue Nozomi on their own. The pair soon confront Abigail, who had kidnapped and tortured Nozomi to lure them out and capture them for her queen. While Abigail pursues Kurumi as she escapes with Nozomi, Asuka prepares to face off against the two Russian magical mercenaries, Stroghil and Pobur.
5	"A Very Realistic Way of Dealing with a Problem"; Transliteration: "Kiwamete Genjitsu-teki na Taishohō" (Japanese: 極めて現実的な対処法)	Kotaro Shimoyama	February 9, 2019
After getting Nozomi to safety, Kurumi fights Abigail, who summons a pair of Disas to aid her. Meanwhile, Asuka defeats Stroghil and Pobur while her fairy, Sachuu, captures an enemy fairy reporting to their leader, Queen. Kurumi is soon supported by Iizuka's M Squad, who suppresses Abigail until Asuka arrives. However, the Queen appears and escapes with Abigail. After Kurumi uses her magic to remove the past week of Nozomi's memories to spare her the trauma of her ordeal, Asuka agrees to join M Squad. With the higher-ups deciding that Nozomi would be safer in the company of magical girls than with a new identity, Asuka is relieved to find Nozomi's lost memories haven't affected their friendship.
6	"Wish Upon a Star"; Transliteration: "Hoshi ni Negai wo" (Japanese: 星に願いを)	Ukyō Kodachi	February 16, 2019
Asuka and her friends go to a Tanabata festival, where they come across the rest of the M Squad as they enjoy their day off. Meanwhile, Mia's squad investigates the residence of Jerome, the son of the victim they found in Mexico who was killed in the same way. Upon finding a motto written in lipstick, Mia is confronted by magical mercenary Crescent Moon Sandino, who seeks vengeance against the US for killing her family in bombings against the Disas. She even has Disas working with her. After killing Sandino, Mia suspects Jerome's death has something to do with the Magical Five – the motto she found was theirs.
7	"Magical Girl Operations Development Unit"; Transliteration: "Mahō Shōjo Tokushuusen Kaihatsu Butai" (Japanese: 魔法少女特殊戦開発部隊)	Makoto Fukami	February 23, 2019
M Squad holds a party welcoming Asuka and Iizuka then gives them a mission. The Russian mafia has found a random bridge in Japan, which will temporarily link Earth to other worlds, and plan to use it to buy illegal magical items. They are aided by Nazani, a witch with fire magic. M Squad handle the Mafia and Asuka and Kurumi fight Nazani. After one of M Squad is incapacitated by Nazani's fireballs Asuka freezes, remembering how she lost her friends in the Disas War, including four who were killed after she took command from Francine (the original leader of the Magical Girls) following her death. Kurumi snaps her out of it and Nazani is defeated after her arm is sliced off. The leader of the Mafia uses a Disas item to teleport away with a suitcase but is found by Magical Girl Phoenix Tamara on assignment from Russia to deal with the Mafia. He dies after the fight, but not before saying she will regret learning what's in the suitcase and quoting "a new world order... humanity's last war... the Babel Brigade." Meanwhile, a magical mercenary named Giess is tasked to "take care" of a certain girl, Chisato.
8	"You'll Be a Wonderful Magical Girl"; Transliteration: "Kitto Sutekina Mahō Shōjo Ni" (Japanese: きっと素敵な魔法少女に)	Makoto Fukami	March 2, 2019
Chisato, a girl who lost her mother and her leg in a car accident, is approached by Giess, who offers to turn her into a Magical Girl and provide her a prosthetic leg. He reveals to Chisato he was once a Somali child soldier who was mortally wounded but saved by the Babel Brigade and given a new body. Chisato accepts. Meanwhile, Asuka goes on a beach trip to Okinawa with Sayako and Nozomi while Kurumi interrogates Nazani for information using torturous methods while reattaching her severed arm. Later, they are briefed by Iizuka on an important trade negotiation between the human and spirit worlds, dubbed the "6th Naha", which will be taking place in Okinawa and they will work alongside Mia and Tamara to provide security for the event. Elsewhere, Giess takes Chisato to her final test, where she must murder the four people responsible for the car accident that maimed her and killed her mother. Chisato gladly kills them and Giess notes they are now ready to carry out their planned attack on 6th Naha.
9	"The Lid of Hell"; Transliteration: "Jigoku no futa" (Japanese: 地獄の蓋)	Norimitsu Kaihō	March 9, 2019
Asuka is pleased she gets to work with her friends again. A VIP comes through the bridge before the conference, wishing to speak to the Magical Girls in private. It is General Tabira, the being from the Spirit World who created the Magical Girls. She brings a powerful magical weapon that will amplify their powers several times over. Meanwhile, the Babel Brigade has a squadron of Cenobite-class Disas launch magical artillery strikes on the base from afar while others approach from the ground. Some go to the base while others attack Naha city to scatter the defenders. Asuka's classmates are in Naha city shopping. Mia handles the Disas in the city while Tamara helps defend the base. Asuka and Kurumi are the last line of defense to protect the bridge. Tabira is persuaded to return to the Spirit World for her own protection but a dimensional bomb has shut down the bridge for the next 48 hours – Tabira is the target, not the conference. Asuka and Kurumi must protect Tabira for the next 48 hours. Giess and Chisato join the attack.
10	"Each of Their Deadly Battles"; Transliteration: "Sorezore no shitō" (Japanese: それぞれの死闘)	Makoto Fukami; Naoya Tamura	March 16, 2019
The troops struggle to hold the base and seem to be winning. However, the Disas attacking them materialize magical guns and rocket launchers, weapons they have not used before, and breakthrough their defense to where Kurumi and Asuka are. Tamara hurries to defeat the ground forces before reinforcements can be sent to the hangar. Nozomi and Sayako attempt to flee the town and Nozomi is injured in the process, unable to walk without Sayako's help. Mia rapidly decimates the Disas in the city but is unprepared when they materialize guns and fire back, breaking her magical shields and badly wounding her. A Disas attempts to shoot Mia in the back but Sayako shouts a warning and she is able to kill it first. Mia then escorts away. Giess and Chisato break into the hangar and Geiss deploy the Cenobite-class Disas from before, which tangle Asuka in magical wires. Chisato knocks Kurumi into another room and raises a magical barrier using an item from the Queen to isolate them, leaving Giess free to go for Tabira. Once Giess reaches Tabira he tells her to give him the weapon she brought for the magical girls. Asuka is unable to cut the wires until Sachuu lobs a magical grenade at the Disas, weakening them enough for Asuka to kill them. By the time Asuka reaches Tabira, she is lying bloody on the ground, seemingly dead.
11	"The Magical Girls and This Beautiful World"; Transliteration: "Mahō shōjo-tachi to utsukushiki kono sekai" (Japanese: 魔法少女たちと美しきこの世界)	Norimitsu Kaihō	March 23, 2019
Kurumi is losing to Chisato, who has turned her whip into a bandage around her fist, enhancing her karate strikes and breaking Kurumi's shields. However, Kurumi is able to inject her with a sedative and disables the barrier. Geiss's fairy leaves with Tabira's weapon while Geiss confronts Asuka. Asuka is knocked through a wall that collapses on her but she frees herself at the cost of her left arm. Geiss recalls how the Magical Girls saved the world but not humanity, which he believes should be destroyed. Asuka's weapon gets stuck in Geiss's armor but Iizuka arrives and gives Asuka Pobur's hatchet, letting her destroy Geiss's armor and expose his human body, little more than a chest and head. Geiss reveals they were after the magical item, not Tabira (who is alive). Kurumi appears dragging Chisato and reattaches Asuka's arm. Before Geiss dies, he apologizes and admits to Chisato the Babel Brigade caused the car accident that killed her mother and crippled her – they could sense her magic potential and wanted to stress her enough she would join them. Geiss dies and Chisato suffers a mental breakdown from the unfairness of it all. Tamara appears in Naha and destroys the Disas who had surrounded Mia, Nozomi, and Sayako, having secured the military base. The battle ends. Afterward, the humans work on repairing the gate so Tabira, who has taken the form of a fox-like fairy to recover her magical energy, can return home. Nozomi thanks Sayako for not leaving her and the magical girls return to their respective countries after saying goodbye.
12	"If this Battle Ever Ends"; Transliteration: "Moshimo kono tatakai ga owattara" (Japanese: もしもこの戦いが終わったら)	Makoto Fukami	March 30, 2019
In the aftermath of the battle, the magical girls give their reports. Through her psychological and physical torture sessions, Kurumi is able to convince Chisato and Nazani to join M-Squad as support members since magical girls are too valuable to outright kill and outfits them with collars that will paralyze them should they ever betray the group. Meanwhile, in China, Lau Pei Pei has significantly changed her appearance and now works as a freelance assassin for hire. Asuka, Kurumi, Sayako, and Nozomi are invited to M-Squad's maid café for a party, where it is revealed that Chisato and Nazani are now working there as new employees. Asuka asks Sayako what she thought about Mia, and Sayako tells her she's glad there are people willing to protect those they don't know as it allows others to live normal lives. Asuka and Kurumi are moved by Sayako's words, knowing their battles have meaning. Iizuka makes a deal with Public Safety to help investigate Babel Brigade. Meanwhile, Queen has received Tabira's weapon and notes they have all of the elements for their final plan except their "vessel". While having sex with Abigail, she reveals that she is in no hurry since she wants the magical girls to get stronger before declaring war on them. As the magical girls head off on separate missions, Asuka remarks "The battles of magical girls will never end."

== Reception ==
The first volume was reviewed by an overall positive review by Rebecca Silverman of Anime News Network. With an overall grade of B−, Silverman stated "The dark magical girl story may not be new, but Magical Girl Special Ops Asuka shows that it's still a genre with potential. Alternately relying on and eschewing genre tropes, Asuka's struggle with her violent past and magical girl identity stands to be both exciting and psychologically interesting." She was most critical concerning the relying on tropes without fully committing to the unique characteristics of the storyline and the inconsistency in the artwork. This inconsistency was mostly with the characteristics of the main heroine which contributes to overtly sexualizing the character.

Gadget Tsūshin listed "magical spanking", a phrase from the anime's eighth episode, in their 2019 anime buzzwords list.
