= Kenta Shinohara =

Japanese manga artist (born 1974)

Kenta Shinohara 篠原 健太
- Born: Kenta Shinohara; 9 January 1974 (age 52) Chiba Prefecture, Japan
- Area: Manga artist
- Notable works: Sket Dance, Astra Lost in Space, Witch Watch
- Awards: Shogakukan Manga Award (2010); Manga Taishō Award (2019)

Kenta Shinohara (篠原 健太, Shinohara Kenta; born 9 January 1974) is a Japanese manga artist. He is best known for his manga series Sket Dance, which was serialized in Weekly Shōnen Jump from 2007 to 2013 and won the Shogakukan Manga Award in 2010. His next series, Astra Lost in Space, serialized on Shonen Jump+ from 2016 to 2017 and won the 2019 Manga Taishō. Shinohara serialized his next series, Witch Watch, in Weekly Shōnen Jump from 2021 to 2026.

== Career ==
Shinohara was born on 9 January 1974, in Chiba Prefecture. Starting his career as a salaryman, Shinohara decided to drop out of his white-collar job for two years while preparing for his debut as a manga artist. He has cited Fujiko F. Fujio, Akira Toriyama, and Takehiko Inoue as his favorite manga artists, and Slam Dunk and Honey and Clover as some of his favorite manga series.

Shinohara worked as an assistant under Hideaki Sorachi on Gintama for a short time using the alias Shintaroh Nakae (なかえ しんたろう, Nakae Shintarō), an anagram of "Kenta Shinohara". During his stint with Sorachi, Shinohara called him a "teacher" who taught him necessary skills.

In both June and September 2003, Shinohara was a finalist for the monthly Jump 12 Outstanding Rookie Manga Award, though he did not win either awards. In 2005, he debuted in Akamaru Jump's Winter Issue with the article "Red Panda Puppet Show".

Shinohara wrote two one-shots for Sket Dance in the winter and summer of 2006, submitting them to Akamaru Jump and Weekly Shōnen Jump respectively. The second one-shot was a pilot arranged in a book volume format, similar to the eventual first chapter of the main series. Serialization of Sket Dance began on 14 July 2007 in Weekly Shōnen Jump issue 33. In 2010, it won the 55th Shogakukan Manga Award in the shōnen category. An anime adaptation by Tatsunoko Productions began airing the following year. After 288 chapters, Sket Dance ended serialization in 2013.

In the fifteenth volume of Sket Dance, released on 1 September 2010, Shinohara announced that he would be getting married. He is the brother-in-law of fellow manga artist Kentaro Yabuki.

Shinohara wrote the lyrics for Water Color (ウォーターカラー), a track within The Sketchbook's 2012 album Sketchbook. He stated that this was the first time he had ever written song lyrics, and that he had based them on his feelings about the "coolness" of the music. He worked on the original character designs for the 2014 anime Battle Spirits: Burning Soul.

From 2016 to 2017, Shinohara serialized the science fiction manga Astra Lost in Space on the website/smartphone app Shonen Jump+. It was published online in the English edition of Weekly Shonen Jump. Astra Lost in Space won the 12th Manga Taishō in 2019, while its anime adaptation won the 51st Seiun Award for Best Dramatic Presentation in 2020.

Shinohara serialized the fantasy manga Witch Watch in Weekly Shōnen Jump from 2021 to 2026. It was simultaneously published overseas via Manga Plus and Viz Media.

== Works ==
- Red Panda Puppet Show (レッサーパンダ・パペットショー, Ressā Panda Papetto Shō) (2005)
- Sket Dance (スケット・ダンス, Suketto Dansu) (2007–2013)
- Towa Fumetsu Devil Point (永久不滅 デビルポイント, Towa Fumetsu Debiru Pointo) (2014)
- Battle Spirits: Burning Soul (バトルスピリッツ烈火魂＜バーニングソウル＞, Batoru Supirittsu Rekka Tamashī (Bāningu Souru)), Original Character Design (2015)
- Astra Lost in Space (彼方のアストラ, Kanata no Asutora) (2016–2017)
- Witch Watch (ウィッチウォッチ, Witchi Wotchi) (2021–2026)
