= Young Gun Carnaval =

Japanese light novel series

- Cover of Young Gun Carnval #1, Light Novel Version by Tokuma Novels

ヤングガン・カルナバル (Yanggugan Karunabaru)
- Genre: Action, Adventure, Drama
- Light novel
- Written by: Makoto Fukami
- Illustrated by: Tow Fukino
- Published by: Tokuma Shoten
- Imprint: Tokuma Novels
- Original run: June 2005 – October 2010
- Volumes: 12
- Manga
- Written by: Makoto Fukami
- Illustrated by: Yuko Satō
- Published by: Flex Comix
- Magazine: Flex Comix Next
- Original run: June 2008 – March 2011
- Volumes: 5

Young Gun Carnaval (ヤングガン・カルナバル, Yanggugan Karunabaru) is a Japanese light novel series written by Makoto Fukami and illustrated by Tow Fukino. The series centers on two teenagers, Kogure Jinpachi and Yumika Tetsuyoshi, who are members of an underground vigilante-type organization called Hybrid, which specializes in targeting and assassinating individuals in cases where Japanese law enforcement agencies cannot apprehend them by legal means.

The novels were published by Tokuma Shoten under their Tokuma Novels EDGE imprint. The chapters focus on Kogure and Yumika and their interactions with the high school students of Koenji High, their comrades and superiors as operatives of Hybrid and the memories they had of their past prior to their recruitment into the organization.

It was then adapted into different media, which consists of a completed manga series and a Drama CD series.

== Plot ==
Kogura Jinpachi is a manga research club member in Kouenzi High School, whose parents were killed when he was a kid by assassins from the Phoenix Syndicate. Yumika Tetsuyoshi grew up outside Japan under the care of her mercenary mother, Seika Tetsuyoshi. These two are seen in the public as high school students. Though in reality they are members of Hybrid, an underground vigilante-type organization whose duty is to hunt and punish criminals who can't be judged by the law. Later on, the Korean National Police Agency joins in with Hybrid to hunt down an ex-Russian OMON officer turned assassin, who is linked to the various Japanese criminal syndicates including the Phoenix Syndicate, by dispatching a SWAT officer named Che Mina, who acts as liaison officer between the two organizations.

== Characters ==
=== Hybrid ===
Jinpachi Kogure (木暮塵八, Kogure Jinpachi)
Voiced by: Sōichirō Hoshi
The lead male character. Lost his parents when he was young, and seeking for revenge. After his parents' deaths, he was taken in by Utsuro Tsubaki, and learnt the "Art of Murder" from him. One of Hybrid's youngest assassins, also known as a "Young Gun". A skilled assassin, but at school he pretends to be an awkward student and a member of the manga research club in his school. Mostly uses a SOPMOD-M14 or a Smith & Wesson SW1911.
Yumika Tetsuyoshi (鉄美弓華, Tetsuyoshi Yumika)
Voiced by: Ryōka Yuzuki
The lead female character, who is into girls although she does not openly admit it publicly. Yumika is one of the youngest assassins in the service of Hybrid along with Jinpachi, a Young Gun. She is a highly skilled assassin with natural-gifted talents. Born and raised in the battlefield, she is the daughter of the Legendary mercenary Seika Tetsuyoshi (鉄美聖火). Mostly use FN Five-seven or AN-94.
Shironeko (白猫, Shironeko)
Voiced by: Shizuka Itō
Boss of Hybrid. A mysterious woman who wants to make a revolution in criminal organization world. She is highly respected by all her subordinates.
Utsuro Tsubaki (椿虚, Tsubaki Utsuro)
Voiced by: Noriaki Sugiyama
One of Hybrid's executive staff. When he was young, he was also a Young Gun. A silent and expressionless guy. Jinpachi's assassination skill teacher. A gun-maniac. Uses Colt Government mostly.

== Media ==
=== Manga ===
A manga version has been serialized by Flex Comix under the Flex Comix Next magazine label.

=== Drama CD ===
Four Drama CDs were released by Frontier Works for ¥3,150 with the first CD released on October 24, 2007, titled "Vertigo High School". The second CD was released on December 21, 2007, titled "Blood Diamond Princess". The third CD was released on February 22, 2008, titled "Family Business". The fourth and final CD was released on April 23, 2008, titled "Girlfight".
