= List of Sket Dance chapters =

Sket Dance is a manga series written and illustrated by Kenta Shinohara and was serialized in Shueisha's shōnen magazine Weekly Shōnen Jump from July 2007 to July 2013. The chapters of Sket Dance were collected in a total of 32 tankōbon volumes, with the first one being released on November 2, 2007, and the final volume on August 2, 2013.

The series was conceived as two one-shots before it was officially serialized, with the first one-shot version debuting in January 2006 in Akamaru Jump, and the second version debuted as a 51-page one-shot seven months later in Weekly Shōnen Jump, this version more closely resembling the final serialized version.

Sket Dance follows the adventures of the Sket-dan, a high school club whose goal it is to help the students and teachers of Kaimei High School with their problems, as they do whatever it takes to help make their campus a better place. The story is mainly told in the perspective of the Sket-dan's three members: Bossun, the leader of the group; Himeko, the "muscle" and the only female in the group; and Switch, the otaku and the "brains" of the group.

Outside Japan, the series is licensed by Tong Li Publishing in Taiwan, by Kazé in France, by Elex Media Komputindo in Indonesia, and by Kim Đồng Publishing House in Vietnam.

== Volume list ==
No.	Title	Release date	ISBN
1	Paint-Mask (ペンキ仮面 Penki Kamen)	November 2, 2007	978-4-08-874463-6
1. "Paint-Mask" (ペンキ仮面, Penki Kamen); 2. "Ape Escape" (エイプ・エスケイプ, Eipu Esukeipu); 3. "The Ghost of the Incinerator" (焼却炉の幽霊, Shōkyakuro no Yūrei); 4. "Peppermint Samurai" (ペパーミント侍, Pepāminto Zamurai); 5. "The Legendary Onihime" (伝説の鬼姫, Densetsu no Onihime); 6. "Onihime and the Crowbar" (鬼姫に金棒, Onihime ni Kanabō); 7. "The Prince of the Hill" (坂の上の王子様, Saka no Ue no Ōji Sama)
The Sket-dan help a student being bullied, baby-sit an Ape, Figure out the mystery behind a ghost at the incinerator, find a prince that turns out to be Bossun, and help a wanna-be Samurai win a tournament as all goes well. But when Himeko gets captured by a girl calling herself Onihime, Bossun has to step up and save the day.
2	Summer Sakura (夏の桜 Natsu no Sakura)	January 4, 2008	978-4-08-874470-4
8. "Misaki and Kōtarō" (美咲と光太郎, Misaki to Kōtarō); 9. "Summer Sakura" (夏の桜, Natsu no Sakura); 10. "Student Council Executive" (生徒会執行部, Seitokai Shikkōbu); 11. "An Awful Snow Princess" (ヤバ雪姫, Yaba Yukihime); 12. "Even Onihime Has Tears in Her Eyes" (鬼姫の目にも涙, Onihime no Me ni mo Namida); 13. "Finding Pelorin" (ファインディング・ペロリン, Faindingu Perorin); 14. "Little Boss Has a Temper" (リトルボスはご機嫌ななめ, Ritoru Bosu wa Go Kigen Naname); 15. "You Mustn't Watch it" (見てはいけない, Mite wa Ikenai); 16. "You Watched it, Didn't You" (見たのね, Mita no ne); 17. "Don't Watch it" (見るんじゃない, Mirunjanai)
The Sket-dan get a request from Tetsu, that his childhood friend moved away, and he started an email relationship but lied about himself, so in need of a stand-in, he requests Bossun. Later, Tsubaki, a member of the student council, comes into the Sket-dan and suspends the Sket-dan! Just then, a request comes from Yabasawa that she needs the Sket-dan to perform a play for a kindergarten. Bossun accepts as well as Tsubaki, and a battle between the Sket-dan and the Student Council begins! The Sket-dan also get a request to find a coupon that captain lost, but it all burns up into flames when Jōgasaki is revealed to have it, and Bossun drinks a drug Chuu-san made, turning him tiny. At the end, the Sket-dan get a cursed DVD, but to find out that it has answers to the upcoming test!
3	So Many Friends (友達がいっぱい Tomodachi ga Ippai)	April 4, 2008	978-4-08-874504-6
18. "Thief Dance - Chapter of the Falcon" (ヌスット・ダンス 隼の章, Nusutto Dansu Hayabusa no Shō); 19. "Genesis Generation" (ジェネシス・ジェネレーション, Jeneshisu Jenerēshon); 20. "Momoka's Seiyū Aspirations" (モモカ声優志願, Momoka Seiyū Shigan); 21. "Producing Uchida" (内田をプロデュース, Uchida o Purodyūsu); 22. "So Many Friends" (友達がいっぱい, Tomodachi ga Ippai); 23. "The Spider's Association" (蜘蛛の会, Kumo no Kai); 24. "The Sket Dan Manga Project" (スケット団漫画化計画, Suketto Dan Mangaka Keikaku); 25. "Gachinko Vivage Battle" (ガチンコ・ビバゲー・バトル, Gachinko Bibagē Batoru); 26. "The War Begins!!" (開戦!!, Kaisen!!); Special "Melancholic Rendezvous" (『メランコリック・ランデヴー』, "Merankorikku Randevū")
At first, a non-cannon chapter with the Sket-dan members being ninjas as the story is set in the Edo Era. Afterward, Yamanobe-sensei begs the Sket-dan to learn how to play Genesis so the student council will allow him to form a club for the game, Momoka comes to the sket-dan so she can learn more on anime, and Uchida, a quiet kid in school, comes to the Sket-dan with one request, to make him popular. Also, rumors have surfaced about a group working out of Kaimei High School which has been blackmailing and extorting students called the Spider's Association, but have no fear, for the Student Council is here! Then a manga artist comes to the Sket-dan to interview them to see if they could be better inspiration for a manga than the student council, and the war between the Sket-dan and the Student council begins in a new competition called the Gachinko Vivage Battle! The Student Council got in for their manga and the Sket-dan is doing it for yabasawa.
4	Gachinko Vivage Battle (ガチンコ・ビバゲー・バトル Gachinko Bibagē Batoru)	July 4, 2008	978-4-08-874544-2
27. "Round 1 - Cooking Colosseum" (一回戦 クッキング コロシアム, Ikkaisen Kukkingu Koroshiamu); 28. "Round 2 - Spirit Fighter" (二回戦 スピリット ファイター, Nikaisen Supiritto Faitā); 29. "Fist and Sword" (拳と剣, Ken to Ken); 30. "Round 3 - Shooting Gangster" (三回戦 シューティング ギャングスター, Sankaisen Shūtingu Gyangusutā); 31. "SCM" (SCM, Sasuga Kūru Megane); 32. "Round 4 - Kokuhaku Monogatari" (四回戦 こくはく物語, Yonkaisen Kokuhaku Monogatari); 33. "Round 5 - Pixie Garden" (五回戦 ピクシーガーデン, Gokaisen Pikushī Gāden); 34. "Found the Pixie" (妖精見つけた, Pikushī Mitsuketa); 35. "The Curtain Falls!!" (閉幕!!, Heimaku!!); Special "Biscuit Dance" (『BISCUIT DANCE』, "Bisuketto Dansu")
After meeting in the finals, Yabasawa was called out for her brother, and so Himeko tried to get Momoka while Bossun, under pressure, randomly selected them for each round. The first round is Himeko vs. Michiru, in a cooking competition with 20 min. The Sket-dan have no faith in Himeko (for she like Peolopop) but surprisingly she gets praise,, but Michiru still wins. Next is Shinzou vs. Tsubaki in the second round of Fighting, and the objective is to break five balls placed on each player. Shinzou takes his Friske and attacks constantly, but when the effect wears out, Tsubaki takes advantage of him and breaks 3 balls, but Shinzou snaps out of it and destroys one saying a samurai only needs one life, and destroys tsubaki's 4 other balls with one slice. The next round 3 is shooting gangster with Switch vs. Asahina. It takes place in an old building thanks to Unyu. Switch and her both seem to be out of bullets but switch reveals he tricked her with his laptop and still had one shot but missed, making her able to draw her second gun. But in the end, Switch lands his first shot and reveals he's ambidextrous. With Momoka unable to show up, the 4th round is with Roman vs. Unyu. Whoever can act out the most believable confession wins. Everyone is captured by Roman, but the guy chooses the Student Council, and Agata notices the shownen jump editor paying him off. Now tied, It's the final battle between Agata and Bossun. They both enter the box, and Agata knows the Bossun just entered because of his rivalry between Tsubaki, and after stating their alike, he says they should make a bet to make things more amusing: if he wins, the Sket Dan will be disbanded. If Bossun wins, he will step down from his position. Bossun agrees and knows that he can only win if he puts on his goggles. Agata then says that Bossun saved both Himeko and Switch, but they saved him. Bossun then lashes out, but thinks he knows which card is the pixie, but it turn out to be the blue star, and Agata reveals he knew about it Bossun memorizing the cards all along, and then Agata places the last card and wins. The Sket-dan holds a leaving party for Bossun, which Agata interrupts. He gives Yabasawa her 3 shaped mouth and asks what's going on. He then remembers the bet and tells them about the interference in the fourth round. He requests calling the game a draw, and Bossun agrees. Agata tells them he had a lot of fun and looks forward to competing against Bossun again. Bossun vows that he won't lose next time.
5	Switch Off (スイッチ・オフ Suitchi Ofu)	October 3, 2008	978-4-08-874579-4
36. "Mistaken Angel" (過ちのエンジェル, Ayamachi no Enjeru); 37. "The Little Princess in High Spirits" (リトルプリンセスは気分上々, Ritoru Purinsesu wa Kibun Jōjō); 38. "A New Take on Momotarō" (改じてくれよう桃太郎, Kaijitekureyō Momotarō); 39. "Otaku and Occult" (オタクトオカルト, Otaku to Okaruto); 40. "Running Home Run" (ランニングホームラン, Ranningu Hōmuran); 41. "Younger Brother, Older Brother" (兄・弟, Ani Otōto); 42. "Switch Off, Part 1" (スイッチ・オフ 前編, Suitchi Ofu Zenpen); 43. "Switch Off, Part 2" (スイッチ・オフ 中編, Suitchi Ofu Chūhen); 44. "Switch Off, Part 3" (スイッチ・オフ 後編, Suitchi Ofu Kōhen); Special 1 "Puppet Dance" (『パペット・ダンス』, "Papetto Dansu"); Special 2 "Resort Dance" (『リゾート・ダンス』, "Rizōto Dansu")
The Volume begins as the Sket-dan get a request to try and understand Dante, who only speaks in visual-Kei and Momoka dropping by and by taking Chuu-san's drug, turning into a little girl with Himeko. Afterword, the principal comes to the sket-dan with a request to make his first-grader son smile and they decide to adapt the story Momotarō, but it soon gets out of hand, and then they have to babysit his grandson, but he turns out to be a stuck up know-it-all. Reiko also requests from Switch to help get her a new computer and runs into her middle school crush, and the Sket-dan run into Shinzou and his brother fighting, which makes Switch think back into his past with his brother. Also, A trio of 4-koma titled "Puppet Dance", "Muppet Dance" and "Silhouette Dance" which star puppet versions of the Sket Dan and a swimsuit contest at the beach with the female characters of Sket Dance for the Bonus chapters.
6	Kaimei Rock Festival (カイメイ・ロック・フェスティバル Kaimei Rokku Fesutibaru)	January 5, 2009	978-4-08-874619-7
45. "Rocket Dance ~Encounter~" (ロケット・ダンス 〜遭遇〜, Roketto Dansu Sōgū); 46. "100 Hairstyles in the Clubroom" (クラブルームで髪を切る100の方法, Kurabu Rūmu de Kami o Kiru Hyaku no Hōhō); 47. "The Second Coming of Mistaken Angel" (過ちのエンジェル再臨, Ayamachi no Enjeru Sairin); 48. "The Great Marriage Interview Opera-son" (お見合い大作ソン, O Miai Daisakuson); 49. "Kaimei Rock Festival" (カイメイ・ロック・フェスティバル, Kaimei Rokku Fesutibaru); 50. "Sketchbook" (スケッチブック, Suketchibukku); 51. "Funny Bunny" (Funny Bunny, Fanī Banī); 52. "I Changed My Image-nyora☆" (イメチェンしたにょら☆, Imechen Shita nyora); 53. "Quiz Warrior Enigman" (クイズ戦士エニグマン, Kuizu Senshi Eniguman)
In another alternate universe chapter, the Sket-dan members are astronauts exploring space, when they come across an alien Tsubaki, and when Bossun gets his hair cut wrong for the new photo, he turns to Chuu-san's hair growth drug and the sket-dan! Dante also comes back looking for a pen he lost, J-son sensei needs help with an Omiai meet, and the Sket-dan go against each other in the Kaimei rock festival, only to their surprise they all join together and make Sketchbook! Later, Momoka comes to visit the Sket-dan, but her personality is completely different and when the quiz club takes Himeko beloved Pelorin doll, Bossun will have to win it back in a quiz game!
7	Ogress (OGRESS Ōguresu)	March 4, 2009	978-4-08-874653-1
54. "This is a Man's Hyperion" (それが男のヒュペリオン, Sore ga Otoko no Hyuperion); 55. "Hetappi Manga Kenkyūjo R" (ヘタッピマンガ研究所R, Hetappi Manga Kenkyūjo Romantikku); 56. "Flagrance" (フレグランス, Fureguransu); 57. "Ogress (1)" (OGRESS-①, Ōguresu (Ichi)); 58. "Ogress (2)" (OGRESS-②, Ōguresu (Ni)); 59. "Ogress (3)" (OGRESS-③, Ōguresu (San)); 60. "Ogress (4)" (OGRESS-④, Ōguresu (Yon)); 61. "Ogress (5)" (OGRESS-⑤, Ōguresu (Go)); 62. "Ogress (6)" (OGRESS-⑥, Ōguresu (Roku)); Special "Silent Dance" (『SILENT DANCE』, "Sairento Dansu")
Yamanobe Sensei asks the Sket-dan to try out his new board game and Roman requests Sket Dan to look for her manuscript for teaching people how to draw manga. Later, Himeko beats up some punks but breaks her hockey stick, Cyclone, in the process so she goes to get a new one at a hockey stick store that himeko goes to. A new manager helps her, but Bossun realizes the old manager was locked up in the locker and it was a robber acting as a manager. Himeko grabs a random hockey stick and catches the guy, then picks that hockey stick and names it Flagrance. When walking home Himeko sees an old playground and her past begins to unfold, along with how the Sket-dan came to be.
8	The First Ever Character Popularity Contest Results Announcement (第1回キャラクター人気投票結果発表 Dai Ikkai Kyarakutā Ninki Tōhyō Kekka Happyō)	June 4, 2009	978-4-08-874681-4
63. "Bad Scientist" (バッド・サイエンティスト, Baddo Saientisuto); 64. "Panic at the Principal's Office" (パニック・イン・校長室, Panikku in Kōchōshitsu); 65. "Oneesan Sensei" (おねえさん先生, O Nē San Sensei); 66. "Group Blind Date Tsukkomi" (合コンでツッコんで, Gōkon de Tsukkonde); 67. "Gatcha Gatcha Trader" (ガチャガチャトレーダー, Gacha Gacha Torēdā); 68. "The First Ever Character Popularity Contest Results Announcement" (第1回キャラクター人気投票結果発表, Dai Ikkai Kyarakutā Ninki Tōhyō Kekka Happyō); 69. "The Glass Man" (ガラス男, Garasu Otoko); 70. "Who...!?" (誰...!?, Dare...!?); 71. "The Glass Maiden" (ガラス乙女, Garasu Otome); Special "Biscuit Dance" (『BISCUIT DANCE』, "Bisuketto Dansu")
The Sket-dan clean out their club room, and they run into some of Switch's failed Inventions. Then the Student Council have a terrible meeting and try to give the principal a surprise party but it doesn't turn out well. They also get a new teacher who was originally a kid show host and is a total clutz, Bossun and Switch go on a blind date, and the Sket-dan get obsessed with Gatcha gatcha. Then there is the first character popularity contest results and the Sket-dan get another mystery to solve... the Glass man, and they get videotaped!
9	Embarrassed Girl (ハズカシガール Hazukashi Gāru)	August 4, 2009	978-4-08-874715-6
72. "Fashionable Samurai" (ファッショナブル侍, Fasshonaburu Zamurai); 73. "Do Your Best, Oneesan!" (おねえさんがんばる!, O Nē San Ganbaru!); 74. "Stakeout Blues" (ステイクアウト・ブルース, Suteikuauto Burūsu); 75. "Food Fighter Captain" (フードファイター・キャプテン, Fūdo Faitā Kyaputen); 76. "Kigurumi Break, Part 1" (きぐるみぶれいく 前編, Kigurumi Bureiku Zenpen); 77. "Kigurumi Break, Part 2" (きぐるみぶれいく 後編, Kigurumi Bureiku Kōhen); 78. "Sudden Temptation" (やにわにテンプテーション, Yaniwa ni Tenputēshon); 79. "Embarrassed Girl, Part 1" (ハズカシガール 前編, Hazukashi Gāru Zenpen); 80. "Embarrassed Girl, Part 2" (ハズカシガール 後編, Hazukashi Gāru Kōhen)
10	Happy Birthday (Happy Birthday Happī Ribāsudē)	November 4, 2009	978-4-08-874752-1
81. "One Guy's Quiet Day Off" (男の穏やかな休日, Otoko no Odayaka na Kyūjitsu); 82. "Happy Birthday (1)" (Happy Birthday-①, Happī Bāsudē (Ichi)); 83. "Happy Birthday (2)" (Happy Birthday-②, Happī Bāsudē (Ni)); 84. "Happy Birthday (3)" (Happy Birthday-③, Happī Bāsudē (San)); 85. "Happy Birthday (4)" (Happy Birthday-④, Happī Bāsudē (Yon)); 86. "Happy Birthday (5)" (Happy Birthday-⑤, Happī Bāsudē (Go)); 87. "Happy Rebirthday (1)" (Happy Rebirthday-①, Happī Ribāsudē (Ichi)); 88. "Happy Rebirthday (2)" (Happy Rebirthday-②, Happī Ribāsudē (Ni)); 89. "Happy Rebirthday (3)" (Happy Rebirthday-③, Happī Ribāsudē (San)); 90. "Happy Rebirthday (4)" (Happy Rebirthday-④, Happī Ribāsudē (Yon))
11	Happy To Meet You (会えて嬉しい Doroppu)	January 4, 2010	978-4-08-874787-3
91. "Special Broken..." (壊れてしまった特別な..., Kowareteshimatta Tokubetsu na...); 92. "Charismatic Student Highly Recommends High-level Club Speed Dating Participation, Congratulation!" (カリスマ生徒イチ押しの部活がハイレベル合コン参加おめでとう, Karisuma Seito Ichioshi no Bukatsu ga Hai Reberu Gōkon Sanka Omedetō); 93. "Onee-san is Popular?" (おねえさんも気に入り?, O Nē San mo Ki ni Iri?); 94. "Your Wish is My Command" (なんでもやりまっせご主人様, Nandemo Yarimasse Go Shūjin Sama); 95. "Koma-chan's Problem" (コマちゃんの困りごと, Koma Chan no Komarigoto); 96. "Exciting Exercise" (エキサイト・エクササイズ, Ekisaito Ekusasaizu); 97. "Happy To Meet You" (会えて嬉しい, Aete Ureshii); 98. "Laughing on the Outside..." (顔で笑って心で..., Kao de Waratte Kokoro de...); 99. "Momoka's Road to Stage Actress" (モモカ舞台女優への道, Momoka Butai Joyū e no Michi)
12	Drop (ドロップ Doroppu)	February 4, 2010	978-4-08-874795-8
100. "Combat Dance" (COMBAT DANCE, Konbatto Dansu); 101. "Look Over Here for a Moment" (しばらく観させてもらいます, Shibaraku Misasetemoraimasu); 102. "Shinba Michiru's Elegant Cooking" (榛葉道流のエレガント・クッキング, Shinba Michiru no Ereganto Kukkingu); 103. "Defeat the Fortune Teller (Part 1)" (占い師をやっつけろ 前編, Uranaishi o Yattsukero Zenpen); 104. "Defeat the Fortune Teller (Part 2)" (占い師をやっつけろ 後編, Uranaishi o Yattsukero Kōhen); 105. "Drop" (ドロップ, Doroppu); 106. "Deka-Dance in a Circle" (マルツイ・デカダンス, Marutsui Dekadansu); 107. "The Guy Known as the Origami God" (おり神と呼ばれた男, Origami to Yobareta Otoko); 108. "Whispered Instructions" (ひそひそインストラクソン, Hisohiso Insutorakuson)
13	You've Got Mail (ユーガッタメール! Yū Gatta Mēru!)	April 2, 2010	978-4-08-870035-9
109. "You Can't Change Fate" (ウンは天にあり, Un wa Ten ni Ari); 110. "You've Got Mail Part 1" (ユーガッタメール! 前編, Yū Gatta Mēru! Zenpen); 111. "You've Got Mail Part 2" (ユーガッタメール! 中編, Yū Gatta Mēru! Chūhen); 112. "You've Got Mail Part 3" (ユーガッタメール! 後編, Yū Gatta Mēru! Kōhen); 113. "VS Student Council! Battle Q" (VS生徒会!バトルQ, Bāsasu Seitokai! Batoru Kyū); 114. "Invisible Man Exposed!" (透明人間露わる!, Tōmei Ningen Arawaru!); 115. "The Manga Girl Goes Wild" (漫画乙女は荒野をめざす, Manga Otome wa Kōya o Mezasu); 116. "Tsubaki and Daisy (1)" (椿と雛菊-①, Tsubaki to Hinagiku (Ichi)); 117. "Tsubaki and Daisy (2)" (椿と雛菊-②, Tsubaki to Hinagiku (Ni))
14	Go Forth! Pelocan Girl (進め!ペロキャンガール Susume! Perokyan Gāru)	July 2, 2010	978-4-08-870074-8
118. "Tsubaki and Daisy (3)" (椿と雛菊-③, Tsubaki to Hinagiku (San)); 119. "Tsubaki and Daisy (4)" (椿と雛菊-④, Tsubaki to Hinagiku (Yon)); 120. "Stop! Jubanni" (ストップ!ジュバン二, Sutoppu! Jubanni); 121. "Masked Love" (Masked Love, Masukudo Rabu); 122. "Genesis World Grand Prix, Part 1" (ジェネシス・ワールド・グランプリ 前編, Jeneshisu Wārudo Guran Puri Zenpen); 123. "Genesis World Grand Prix, Part 2" (ジェネシス・ワールド・グランプリ 後編, Jeneshisu Wārudo Guran Puri Kōhen); 124. "May I Come Backstage?" (楽屋に行っていいかい?, Gakuya ni Itte Ii kai?); 125. "Fast Reactions, Doubts, Meetings" (快技・懐疑・会議, Kaigi Kaigi Kaigi); 126. "Go Forth! Pelocan Girl" (進め!ペロキャンガール, Susume! Perokyan Gāru)
15	Biscuit Dance (ビスケット・ダンス Bisuketto Dansu)	September 3, 2010	978-4-08-870103-5
127. "Biscuit Dance, a Fun Playtime Chapter" (ビスケット・ダンス 楽しいおゆうぎ会の巻, Bisuketto Dansu Tanoshii O Yūgi Kai no Maki); 128. "The Twin-tail Tsundere Girl" (ツインテールツンデレガール, Tsuin Tēru Tsundere Gāru); 129. "Fly! Hōsuke" (飛べ!ホウスケ, Tobe! Hōsuke); 130. "Tsubaki's Lame T-shirt Collection" (椿ダサＴコレクション, Tsubaki Dasa Tī Korekushon); 131. "Skip!" (Skip!, Sukippu!); 132. "School Trip Rhapsody (1)" (修学旅行狂詩曲-①, Sukūru Torippu Rapusodī (Ichi)); 133. "School Trip Rhapsody (2)" (修学旅行狂詩曲-②, Sukūru Torippu Rapusodī (Ni)); 134. "School Trip Rhapsody (3)" (修学旅行狂詩曲-③, Sukūru Torippu Rapusodī (San)); 135. "School Trip Rhapsody (4)" (修学旅行狂詩曲-④, Sukūru Torippu Rapusodī (Yon))
16	School Trip Rhapsody (修学旅行狂詩曲 Sukūru Torippu Rapusodī)	December 3, 2010	978-4-08-870148-6
136. "School Trip Rhapsody (5)" (修学旅行狂詩曲-⑤, Sukūru Torippu Rapusodī (Go)); 137. "School Trip Rhapsody (6)" (修学旅行狂詩曲-⑥, Sukūru Torippu Rapusodī (Roku)); 138. "School Trip Rhapsody (7)" (修学旅行狂詩曲-⑦, Sukūru Torippu Rapusodī (Nana)); 139. "A Confusing Group of Friends" (まぎらわしいゆかいな仲間たち, Magirawashii Yukai na Nakama Tachi); 140. "A Profound Offline Meeting" (オフカイはオクガフカイ, Ofu Kai wa Oku ga Fukai); 141. "A Record of the Student Council Executives' Recruitment Manga" (生徒会役員募集漫画制作記録, Seitokai Yakuin Boshū Manga Seisaku Kiroku); 142. "The Guy Little Sister is Interested in Interests Her Brother" (妹の気になるアイツが気になる兄, Imōto no Ki ni Naru Aitsu ga Ki ni Naru Ani); 143. "A Roaring Tsukkomi Battle!" (爆笑ツッコミバトル!, Bakushō Tsukkomi Batoru!); 144. "A Rare Guy Who is Anxious About a Date" (嬉遊を杞憂する稀有な男, Kiyū o Kiyū Suru Kiyū na Otoko)
17	The last day of president (The last day of president Za Rasuto Dei obu Purejidento)	February 4, 2011	978-4-08-870177-6
145. "Quest Dance" (クエスト・ダンス 旅の始まり, Kuesuto Dansu Tabi no Hajimari); 146. "The Archangel's Ballad" (大天使の小さな恋, Daitenshi no Barādo); 147. "For the Sake of Creating a Superior Campus" (より良い学園作りの為に, Yori Yoi Gakuen Zukuri no Tame ni); 148. "The last day of president" (The last day of president, Za Rasuto Dei obu Purejidento); 149. "Operation Love Potion, Part 1" (オペレーション・ラブポーション 前編, Operēshon Rabu Pōshon Zenpen); 150. "Operation Love Potion, Part 2" (オペレーション・ラブポーション 後編, Operēshon Rabu Pōshon Kōhen); 151. "The Secret Story of the Creation of Kaimei High School's New Anthem" (開盟学園高校新校歌作詞秘話, Kaimei Gakuen Kōkō Shin Kōka Sakushi Hiwa); 152. "Chase Kagerō!" (影浪を追え!, Kagerō o Oe!); 153. "Treasurer Usami Hani" (会計 宇佐見羽仁, Kaikei Usami Hani)
18	Burning Falcon! (燃えろファルケン! Moero Faruken!)	April 4, 2011	978-4-08-870209-4
154. "A Perverted Criminal and 8 Eccentric People" (ヘンタイ犯人とヘンジン8人, Hentai Hannin to Henjin Hachi Nin); 155. "Figuring Out Each Other's Motives" (さぐりあい本音, Saguriai Hara); 156. "The Road Roman Takes" (ロマンが道を往く, Roman ga Michi o Yuku); 157. "The Ninja, the Demon, and the Red Horns" (忍と鬼と赤い角, Shinobi to Oni to Akai Tsuno); 158. "Lonely Boy" (サビシンボーイ, Sabishin Bōi); 159. "Burning Falcon!" (燃えろファルケン!, Moero Faruken!); 160. "The Secret Disciplinary Committee" (ひみつの懲罰委員会, Himitsu no Chōbatsu Iinkai); 161. "Roomshare Slapstick" (ルームシェア・スラップスティック, Rūmu Shea Surappusutikku); 162. "Trouble Role-Reversal" (トラブル・ロール・リバーサル, Toraburu Rōru Ribāsaru)
19	Lovely Bunny Girl (ラブリーバニーガール Raburī Banī Gāru)	July 4, 2011	978-4-08-870235-3
163. "Lovely Bunny Girl" (ラブリーバニーガール, Raburī Banī Gāru); 164. "The 2nd Character Popularity Contest Results Announcement" (第2回キャラクター人気投票結果発表, Dai Ni Kai Kyarakutā Ninki Tōhyō Kekka Happyō); 165. "The Man Who Became A Stick Figure" (棒になった男, Bō ni Natta Otoko); 166. "Renovation!! Dramatically, Subtly, and Hastily" (大改造!!劇的ビミョーあたふた, Dai Kaizō!! Gekiteki Bimyō Atafuta); 167. "My Heart's Thumping Like Mad" (ドキドキする, Dokidoki Suru); 168. " The 'Let's Work Together to Increase Our Powers of Concentration' Study Meeting" (ゴッツーケピーアッシュボーン, Gottsūke Pīasshu Bōn); 169. "'Stay Focused! Let's Help Each Other!' Study Session!" (集中力を高めみんなで協力し合う勉強会, Shūchūryoku o Takame Minna de Kyōryoku Shiau Benkyōkai); 170. "Christmas Card, Part 1" (クリスマスカード 前編, Kurisumasu Kādo Zenpen); 171. "Christmas Card. Part 2" (クリスマスカード 後編, Kurisumasu Kādo Kōhen)
20	Solitude (SOLITUDE Sorichūdo)	September 2, 2011	978-4-08-870284-1
172. "The End-Of-Year Lazy Warrior" (年末の堕剣士, Nenmatsu no Dakenshi); 173. "A Real-Life Fukuwarai" (リアル福笑い, Riaru Fukuwarai); 174. "The Brother's Worried About Whatever The Sister's Worried About" (妹の悩みに悩む兄, Imōto no Nayami ni Nayamu Ani); 175. "Visual Yearning" (ビジュアル慕情, Bijuaru Bojō); 176. "SOLITUDE (1)" (SOLITUDE-①, Sorichūdo (Ichi)); 177. "SOLITUDE (2)" (SOLITUDE-②, Sorichūdo (Ni)); 178. "SOLITUDE (3)" (SOLITUDE-③, Sorichūdo (San)); 179. "General Affairs Manager Katō Kiri" (庶務 加藤希里, Shomu Katō Kiri); 180. "" (SPIRIT DANCE, Supiritto Dansu)
21	Valentine Crisis (バレンタイン・クライシス Barentain Kuraishisu)	November 4, 2011	978-4-08-870304-6
181. "The Rated 6+ Horror Prize" (6禁ホラー賞, Roku Kin Horā Shō); 182. "The Food Fighter's Distress" (憂いのフードファイター, Urei no Fūdo Faitā); 183. "A Winter Courtyard Battle" (中庭冬の陣, Nakaniwa Fuyu no Jin); 184. "The Brother's Worries About His Sister Worry His Friend" (妹を心配する兄を心配する友, Imōto o Shinpai Suru Ani o Shinpai Suru Tomo); 185. "Quecchon Question" (クエッチョン・クエスチョン, Kuetchon Kuesuchon); 186. "Valentine Crisis, Part 1" (バレンタイン・クライシス 前編, Barentain Kuraishisu Zenpen); 187. "Valentine Crisis, Part 2" (バレンタイン・クライシス 中編, Barentain Kuraishisu Chūhen); 188. "Valentine Crisis, Part 3" (バレンタイン・クライシス 後編, Barentain Kuraishisu Kōhen); 189. "Valentine Variety" (バレンタイン・バラエティ, Barentain Baraeti)
22	Figure Doll Painting! (フィギュア・ドール・ペインティング! Figyua Dōru Peintingu!)	February 3, 2012	978-4-08-870369-5
190. "ROBOT DANCE" (ROBOT DANCE, Robotto Dansu); 191. "Harmless Fruit" (いたいけな果実, Itaike na Kajitsu); 192. "Figure Doll Painting" (フィギュア・ドール・ペインティング!, Figyua Dōru Peintingu!); 193. "Figure Doll Modeling" (フィギュア・ドール・モデリング, Figyua Dōru Moderingu); 194. "Brother and Junior" (弟と弟分, Otōto to Otōtobun); 195. "Otasuke-Gumi Reminiscences" (お助け組懐旧談, O Tasuke Gumi Kaikyūdan); 196. "Paying a Visit to the Unyū Household!" (丹生家お宅訪問!, Unyū Ke O Taku Hōmon!); 197. "The Gesu-ling Club's Crisis" (ゲスリング部の危機, Gesuringu Bu no Kiki); 198. "The Sister Who is Worried About Her Brother Who is Worried About His Sister Worries Her Friends, Part 1" (妹の悩みに悩む兄に悩む妹とその仲間達 前編, Imōto no Nayami ni Nayamu Ani ni Nayamu Imōto to Sono Nakama Tachi Zenpen)
23	(オクルコトバ Okuru Kotoba)	March 2, 2012	978-4-08-870401-2
199. "The Sister Who is Worried About Her Brother Who is Worried About His Sister Worries Her Friends, Part 2" (妹の悩みに悩む兄に悩む妹とその仲間達 中編, Imōto no Nayami ni Nayamu Ani ni Nayamu Imōto to Sono Nakama Tachi Chūhen); 200. "The Sister Who is Worried About Her Brother Who is Worried About His Sister Worries Her Friends, Part 3" (妹の悩みに悩む兄に悩む妹とその仲間達 後編, Imōto no Nayami ni Nayamu Ani ni Nayamu Imōto to Sono Nakama Tachi Kōhen); 201. "Tsukkomi Prohibition Battle" (ツッコミ禁止デスマッチ, Tsukkomi Kinshi Desumatchi); 202. "The 3rd Years' Farewell Ceremony, Part 1" (3年生を送る会奮戦記 前編, San Nen Sei o Okuru Kaifun Senki Zenpen); 203. "The 3rd Years' Farewell Ceremony, Part 2" (3年生を送る会奮戦記 後編, San Nen Sei o Okuru Kaifun Senki Kōhen); 204. "Farewell Address - Juniors" (オクルコトバ 送辞, Okuru Kotoba Sōji); 205. "Farewell Address - Seniors" (オクルコトバ 答辞, Okuru Kotoba Tōji); 206. "The Rumored Super High-Schooler" (話題のスーパー高校生, Wadai no Sūpā Kōkōsei); 207. "Demons' Demonstration" (デモンズ・デモンストレーション, Demonzu Demonsutorēshon)
24	Happy New School Year! (Happy New School Year! Happī Nyū Sukūru Iyā!)	April 4, 2012	978-4-08-870429-6
208. "The Student Council Orientation Training Camp" (生徒会オリエンテーション合宿, Seitokai Orientēshon Gasshuku); 209. "Falling Cherry Blossoms of Confusion" (錯乱の花散るらん, Sakuran no Hana Chiruran); 210. "Happy New School Year" (Happy New School Year!, Happī Nyū Sukūru Iyā!); 211. "3-C's Class Representative Election" (3年C組学級委員選挙, San Nen Shī Gumi Gakkyū Iin Senkyo); 212. "The Club Introductions Assembly" (部活紹介しよう会, Bukatsu Shōkai Shiyō Kai); 213. "Cheeky Rookie, Part 1" (Cheeky Rookie 前編, Chīkī Rūkī Zenpen); 214. "Cheeky Rookie, Part 2" (Cheeky Rookie 中編, Chīkī Rūkī Chūhen); 215. "Cheeky Rookie, Part 3" (Cheeky Rookie 後編, Chīkī Rūkī Kōhen); 216. "Nakatani-san from Class A" (A組の中谷さん, Ē Gumi no Nakatani San)
25	Stealth Bodyguard (ステルス・ボディガード Suterusu Bodigādo)	July 4, 2012	978-4-08-870463-0
217. "Pretend President" (Pretend President, Puritendo Purejidento); 218. "Rumi's Tour of Club Activities" (ルミの部活見学ツアー, Rumi no Bukatsu Kengaku Tsuā); 219. "Manly Discommunication" (漢気ディスコミュニケーション, Otokogi Disukomyunikēshon); 220. "Pure Moist Moisturizing Handcream" (しっとりじっとりモイスピュアハンドクリーム, Shittori Jittori Moisupyua Hando Kurīmu); 221. "Stoic Student Teacher, Part 1" (Stoic Student Teacher 前編, Sutoikku Suchūdento Tīchā Zenpen); 222. "Stoic Student Teacher, Part 2" (Stoic Student Teacher 後編, Sutoikku Suchūdento Tīchā Kōhen); 223. "Love Gesu-troyer" (恋愛ゲストロイヤー, Ren'ai Gesutoroiyā); 224. "Dad's Longest Day" (義父の一番長い日, Oyaji no Ichiban Nagai Hi); 225. "" (ステルス・ボディガード, Suterusu Bodigādo); Special "" (『ダイソウサク・タイソウフク』, "Dai Sōsaku Taisō Fuku")
26	Trouble Travel (トラブル・トラベル Toraburu Toraberu)	September 4, 2012	978-4-08-870497-5
226. "A Rival Appears!? An Extremely Hot-Headed Contest!" (ライバル登場!?激アツ真っ向勝負!, Raibaru Tōjō!? Gekiatsu Makkō Shōbu!); 227. "Golden Week Plans Discussion" (GWレジャー計画ディスカッション, Gōruden Wīku Rejā Keikaku Disukasshon); 228. "Trouble Travel (1)" (トラブル・トラベル-①, Toraburu Toraberu (Ichi)); 229. "Trouble Travel (2)" (トラブル・トラベル-②, Toraburu Toraberu (Ni)); 230. "Trouble Travel (3)" (トラブル・トラベル-③, Toraburu Toraberu (San)); 231. "Trouble Travel (4)" (トラブル・トラベル-④, Toraburu Toraberu (Yon)); 232. "Trouble Travel (5)" (トラブル・トラベル-⑤, Toraburu Toraberu (Go)); 233. "Milk Fujisaki Magic Show" (ミルク・フジサキ・マジックショー, Miruku Fujisaki Majikku Shō); 234. "Takuto ****'s Weak Point" (○○タクトのウィークポイント, __ Takuto no Wīku Pointo)
27	(部屋とワイセツと私 Heya to Waisetsu to Watashi)	November 2, 2012	978-4-08-870533-0
235. "Switch On His Own" (スイッチひとりぼっち, Suitchi Hitori Botchi); 236. "A Room, Lewdness, and Me" (部屋とワイセツと私, Heya to Waisetsu to Watashi); 237. "The Agata Saaya Fanclub" (安形紗綾ファンクラブ, Agata Saaya Fan Kurabu); 238. "Sket Dan for a Day" (1日スケット団ス, Ichi Nichi Suketto Dansu); 239. "Innocent Little President" (リトルプレジデントは幼気盛り, Ritoru Purejidento wa Itaike Zakari); 240. "The Road to Establish The Games Club" (ゲーム部設立への道, Gēmu Bu Setsuritsu e no Michi); 241. "Switch On (1)" (スイッチ・オン-①, Suitchi On (Ichi)); 242. "Switch On (2)" (スイッチ・オン-②, Suitchi On (Ni)); 243. "Switch On (3)" (スイッチ・オン-③, Suitchi On (San))
28	Switch On (スイッチ・オン Suitchi On)	December 4, 2012	978-4-08-870599-6
244. "Switch On (4)" (スイッチ・オン-④, Suitchi On (Yon)); 245. "Switch On (5)" (スイッチ・オン-⑤, Suitchi On (Go)); 246. "Switch On (6)" (スイッチ・オン-⑥, Suitchi On (Roku)); 247. "Switch On (7)" (スイッチ・オン-⑦, Suitchi On (Nana)); 248. "Switch On (8)" (スイッチ・オン-⑧, Suitchi On (Hachi)); 249. "Switch On (9)" (スイッチ・オン-⑨, Suitchi On (Kyū)); 250. "Switch On (10)" (スイッチ・オン-⑩, Suitchi On (Jū)); 251. "Switch On (11)" (スイッチ・オン-⑪, Suitchi On (Jū Ichi)); 252. "Around That Time" (その頃の, Sono Koro no)
29	Birdman (バードマン Bādoman)	February 4, 2013	978-4-08-870629-0
253. "Good Looking Sensation" (グッド・ルッキング・センセーション, Guddo Rukkingu Sensēshon); 254. "Hollywood Movie Stardust" (ハリウッド・ムービー・スターダスト, Hariuddo Mūbī Sutādasuto); 255. "A Fly Clad in Gold" (黄金を纏って翔べ, Ōgon o Matotte Tobe); 256. "Big Brother, Little Sister" (兄・妹, Ani Imōto); 257. "Birdman, Part 1" (バードマン 前編, Bādoman Zenpen); 258. "Birdman, Part 2" (バードマン 後編, Bādoman Kōhen); 259. "Let's Go to The Ninja's House!" (忍者屋敷へ行こう!, Ninja Yashiki e Ikō!); 260. "Album of Memories 'The Sports Festival'" (思い出アルバム「体育祭」, Omoide Arubamu "Taiikusai"); 261. "Quest Dance: Warrior of Revenge" (クエスト・ダンス 逆襲の戦士, Kuesuto Dansu Gyakushū no Senshi)
30	(夏祭りグラフィティ Natsu Matsuri Gurafiti)	April 4, 2013	978-4-08-870684-9
262. "Riding On The Winds of Time, Part 1" (時空の風に乗って 前編, Toki no Kaze ni Notte Zenpen); 263. "Riding On The Winds of Time, Part 2" (時空の風に乗って 後編, Toki no Kaze ni Notte Kōhen); 264. "Mascot Character Summer" (ゆるキャラサマー, Yuru Kyara Samā); 265. "Retirement Match" (引退試合, Intai Jiai); 266. "Beach Girls Collection" (ビーチ・ガールズ・コレクション, Bīchi Gāruzu Korekushon); 267. "Summer Festival Graffiti" (夏祭りグラフィティ, Natsu Matsuri Gurafiti); 268. "Instant Assistant" (インスタント・アシスタント, Insutanto Ashisutanto); 269. "One-Man Bicycle Trip Documentary" (自転車一人旅密着ドキュメント, Jitensha Hitori Tabi Mitchaku Dokyumento); 270. "The Conte by King of Conte" (The Conte by King of Conte, Za Konto bai Kingu obu Konto)
31	Inherit the Twin Stars (Inherit the Twin Stars Inheritto za Tsuin Sutāzu)	June 4, 2013	978-4-08-870764-8
271. "Lyrics To Present To Your Friends" (吟友に捧げる叙情詩, Tomo ni Sasageru Ririkku); 272. "Mandatory Assembly of Grudge-Dispelling" (恨み晴らさでおくべき会, Urami Harasadeokubeki Kai); 273. "Classroom Wedding" (クラスルーム・ウェディング, Kurasurūmu Wedingu); 274. "The Case Of The Student Room's Divided Cake" (生徒会室ケーキバラバラ事件, Seitokaishitsu Kēki Barabara Jiken); 275. "The Retirement of the Sket Dan" (脱スケット団, Datsu Suketto Dan); 276. "Being An Adult Is Tough" (大人はつらいよ, Otona wa Tsurai yo); 277. "Hidden Love" (秘め恋, Himekoi); 278. "Inherit the Twin Stars, Part 1" (Inherit the Twin Stars 前編, Inheritto za Tsuin Sutāzu Zenpen); 279. "Inherit the Twin Stars, Part 2" (Inherit the Twin Stars 後編, Inheritto za Tsuin Sutāzu Kōhen)
32	Last Dance (ラストダンズ Rasuto Dansu)	August 2, 2013	978-4-08-870783-9
280. "Last Dance (1)" (ラストダンズ-①, Rasuto Dansu (Ichi)); 281. "Last Dance (2)" (ラストダンズ-②, Rasuto Dansu (Ni)); 282. "Last Dance (3)" (ラストダンズ-③, Rasuto Dansu (San)); 283. "Last Dance (4)" (ラストダンズ-④, Rasuto Dansu (Yon)); 284. "Last Dance (5)" (ラストダンズ-⑤, Rasuto Dansu (Go)); 285. "Last Dance (6)" (ラストダンズ-⑥, Rasuto Dansu (Roku)); 286. "To The Both Of You" (キミ達を, Kimi Tachi o); 287. "Graduation" (卒業, Sotsugyō); 288. "SKET DANCE" (SKET DANCE, Suketto Dansu)
