= Hiroyuki Yoshino =

Japanese voice actor and singer

- 吉野 裕行
- Born: February 6, 1974 (age 52); Chiba Prefecture, Japan
- Other names: Sakiware Chopsticks; Koji Kitayama; Shun Kazama
- Occupations: Voice actor; singer
- Years active: 1996–present
- Agent: ninelive.

Hiroyuki Yoshino (吉野 裕行, Yoshino Hiroyuki; born February 6, 1974) is a Japanese voice actor and singer. On leading roles, he played Yoshimori Sumimura in Kekkaishi, Hibiki Tokai in Vandread, Yuji Kagura in Tona-Gura!, Takumi Nishijō in Chaos;Head, Yusuke "Bossun" Fujisaki in Sket Dance, Meow in Space Dandy, Favaro in Rage of Bahamut: Genesis and Galina in Yatterman Night. On supporting roles, he played Bernard Firestar in Divergence Eve, Chrome in Cluster Edge, Debito in La storia della Arcana Famiglia, Natsuki Minami in Minami-ke, Allelujah Haptism in Mobile Suit Gundam 00, Yuto Kido in Inazuma Eleven, Rin Hirakoba in The Prince of Tennis, Kenichi Saruyama in To Love Ru, Hajime Iwaizumi in Haikyuu!!, Houka Inumuta in Kill la Kill, Hizashi Yamada in My Hero Academia and Yasutumo Arakita in Yowamushi Pedal.

== Personal life ==
On August 3, 2021, it was announced that Yoshino had tested positive for COVID-19.

== Filmography ==
=== Animation ===
List of voice performances in animation
| Year | Title | Role | Notes | Source |
|---|---|---|---|---|
| 1996–1998 | Saber Marionette J series | Iwadera, Kasayan, Kazagurumaya | Also J to X | |
| 1997 | Bakusō Kyōdai Let's & Go!! WGP | Carl Hessler | | |
| 1997 | Revolutionary Girl Utena | Various characters | | |
| 1999 | Burst Ball Barrage!! Super B-Daman | Goto | | |
| 1999 | Sensual Phrase | Satoshi | | |
| 2000 | Boogiepop Phantom | Mamoru Oikawa | | |
| 2000–2002 | Pilot Candidate | Clay Cliff Fortran | TV and OVA series | |
| 2000 | Boys Be... | Staff | | |
| 2000 | Love Hina series | Masayuki Haitani, Onoi, Eiji | | |
| 2000 | Descendants of Darkness | Saionji | | |
| 2000 | Hajime no Ippo | Akira Shigeta | | |
| 2000 | Inuyasha | Ginta | | |
| 2001 | Star Ocean EX | Pi | | |
| 2001 | Dennō Bōkenki Webdiver | Shakuon, Ryuto | | |
| 2001–2004 | Galaxy Angel series | Jonathan, others | | |
| 2001 | Shaman King | Nijoto | | |
| 2001 | Angel Tales | Byakko no Gai | | |
| 2001 | Vandread | Hibiki Tokai | Also OVAs and specials | |
| 2001 | Hikaru no Go | Mitsuru Mashiba | | |
| 2002 | Aquarian Age: Sign for Evolution | Junichi Kojima | | |
| 2002 | Azumanga Daioh | Masaaki Ohyama | | |
| 2002 | Jing: King of Bandits | Young Angostura | | |
| 2002 | Unbalance アンバランス MENU series | Jun Okubo | OVA Adult published by Discovery | |
| 2002 | Saikano | Shingo | TV | |
| 2002 | Hungry Heart: Wild Striker | Hiroshi Ichikawa | | |
| 2002 | Ashita no Yukinojo ja:あしたの雪之丞 | Yukinojō Yukimura | OVA Adult | |
| 2002 | GetBackers | Shuu | | |
| 2002 | Barom-1 | Tsuyoshi Kido | | |
| 2003 | Stratos 4 | Sora Ikeda | | |
| 2003 | Dear Boys | Kazuya Sato | | |
| 2003 | Ninja Scroll: The Series | Jiroza | TV series | |
| 2003–2007 | Saint Beast series | Byakko no Gai | | |
| 2003 | Divergence Eve | Bernard Firestar | | |
| 2003–2004 | Massugu ni Ikō ja:まっすぐにいこう | Mametaro | TV series 1 and 2 | |
| 2003 | Yami to Boushi to Hon no Tabibito | Koutarou Nanbu | | |
| 2003 | Fullmetal Alchemist | Haboku-chan | | |
| 2003 | Rockman.EXE Axess | Plantman | | |
| 2003 | Shingetsutan Tsukihime | Michael Roa Valdamjong | | |
| 2004 | Misaki Chronicles | Bernard Firestar | | |
| 2004 | Kaiketsu Zorori | Bobusurē senshu ボブスレー選手 | | |
| 2004 | Paranoia Agent | Naoyuki Saruta | | |
| 2004 | Tweeny Witches | Sigma | | |
| 2004 | Initial D: Fourth Stage | Sakamoto | | |
| 2004 | Samurai Champloo | Player | | |
| 2004 | Azusa, Otetsudai Shimasu! | Ichiro Yamada | | |
| 2004 | Rockman.EXE Stream | Plantman | | |
| 2004–2006 | School Rumble series | Takeichi Fuyuki | | |
| 2004 | Black Jack | Shogo, Jaws | | |
| 2004 | Gakuen Alice | Tashiro | | |
| 2005 | Lime-iro Senkitan X | Kyōshirō Inukai | | |
| 2005 | Battle B-Daman: Fire Spirits! | Equus | | |
| 2005 | Girls Bravo series | Mamoru Machida | | |
| 2005 | Otogi-Jūshi Akazukin | Sekko | OVA series | |
| 2005 | Fighting Fantasy Girl Rescue Me: Mave-chan ja:戦闘妖精少女 たすけて! メイヴちゃん | Rei Sugiyama | OVA | |
| 2005 | MÄR | Giromu | | |
| 2005 | Loveless | Youji | | |
| 2005 | Mirmo! | Koichi Sumita | | |
| 2005 | Petopeto-san | Kouji Tachibana | | |
| 2005 | Rockman.EXE Beast | Mister Press, Zoano Plantman | | |
| 2005–2006 | Cluster Edge | Chrome | Also OVA | |
| 2005 | SoltyRei | Mobohan 模倣犯 | | |
| 2005 | Blood+ | Kai Miyagusuku | | |
| 2005 | Ginban Kaleidoscope | Pete Pumps | | |
| 2005 | Noein | Tsuyoshi Fujiwara | | |
| 2005–2007 | Major | Takigawa | season 2 and 3 | |
| 2006 | The Prince of Tennis | Rin Hirakoba | | |
| 2006 | Kiba | Zed | | |
| 2006 | Utawarerumono | Nuwangi | | |
| 2006 | Love Get Chu: Miracle Seiyuu Hakusho | Chairperson | | |
| 2006 | Ray the Animation | Yusuke | | |
| 2006 | Zegapain | Kawaguchi Kenta | | |
| 2006 | Kirarin Revolution | Marco Cappucino | | |
| 2006 | Tama and Friends: Search For It! The Magic Puni-Puni Stone | Garu | | |
| 2006 | Tona-Gura! | Yuji Kagura | | |
| 2006 | Kemonozume | Kazuma Momota | | |
| 2006 | Tokimeki Memorial Only Love | Yusuke Kayama | | |
| 2006–2007 | Pururun! Shizuku-chan series | Mine's Husband | Also Aha | |
| 2006 | Kekkaishi | Yoshimori Sumimura | | |
| 2007–2010 | Nodame Cantabile series | Toshihiko Miyoshi | | |
| 2007 | Reideen | Kamo | | |
| 2007 | Heroic Age | Atlantis | | |
| 2007 | Claymore | Sid | | |
| 2007 | Darker Than Black | Kenji Sakurai | | |
| 2007 | Blue Dragon | Husband | | |
| 2007 | Skull Man | Akira Usami | | |
| 2007 | Baccano! | Firo Prochainezo | | |
| 2007 | Neuro: Supernatural Detective | Shinobu Godai | | |
| 2007 | You're Under Arrest: Full Throttle | Boy | | |
| 2007–2008 | Mobile Suit Gundam 00 series | Allelujah Haptism | | |
| 2007–2008 | Shugo Chara! | Daichi | Also Doki | |
| 2007–2013 | Minami-ke series | Natsuki Minami | | |
| 2008 | True Tears | Miyokichi Nobuse | | |
| 2008 | Yatterman | Gan-chan / Yatterman #1 | | |
| 2008 | Allison & Lillia | Treize Bain | | |
| 2008–2015 | To Love Ru series | Kenichi Saruyama, Maron | | |
| 2008 | Monochrome Factor | Shichiya | | |
| 2008 | Soul Eater | Ox Ford | | |
| 2008 | Toshokan Sensō | Kei Tezuka | | |
| 2008 | Sands of Destruction | Agan Madoru | | |
| 2008 | Toradora! | Koji Haruta | | |
| 2008 | Inazuma Eleven | Yuto Kido, Kamimura Kirito, Young Daisuke Endō, Giorgio Giannini | | |
| 2008 | Chaos;Head | Takumi Nishijou | | |
| 2008 | Tytania | Idria Tytania | | |
| 2009 | Natsume's Book of Friends | Gen | | |
| 2009 | Fullmetal Alchemist: Brotherhood | Solf J. Kimblee | | |
| 2009 | Shangri-La | Zhang | | |
| 2009 | Sōten Kōro | Juniku | | |
| 2009 | First Love Limited | Yuuji Arihara | | |
| 2009 | Inuyasha: The Final Act | Ginta | | |
| 2009 | Kobato | Zuishou | | |
| 2009 | Aoi Bungaku series | Serinuntiusu セリヌンティウス | | |
| 2010–2012 | Hakuōki series | Heisuke Tōdō | | |
| 2010 | Night Raid 1931 | Aoi Miyoshi | | |
| 2010 | Mayoi Neko Overrun! | Ieyasu Kikuchi | | |
| 2010 | Rainbow: Nisha Rokubō no Shichinin | Kogure | | |
| 2010 | The Tatami Galaxy | Ozu | | |
| 2010 | Highschool of the Dead | Co-pilot | | |
| 2010–2011 | Nura: Rise of the Yokai Clan series | Gozumaru | | |
| 2010 | Panty & Stocking with Garterbelt | Brief | | |
| 2011 | Dream Eater Merry | Landsborough | | |
| 2011–2012 | Is This a Zombie? series | Orito | | |
| 2011 | Wandering Son | Shinpei Doi | | |
| 2011 | Showa Monogatari | Yusuke Sawatari | | |
| 2011 | Sket Dance | Yusuke "Bossun" Fujisaki | | |
| 2011 | Astarotte no Omocha | Sigurð Sveinnsson Svarthæð | | |
| 2011–2012 | Inazuma Eleven Go | Tsurumasa Hayami, Clark Wonderbot, Yuto Kido, Meizu, others | Also Chrono Stone | |
| 2011 | Blade | Radu | | |
| 2011 | Bakuman | Bossun | Season 2 | |
| 2011 | Hunter x Hunter | Genthru | Season 4 | |
| 2011 | Chibi Devi! | Shin Sugisaki | | |
| 2011 | Bleach | Moe Shishigawara | | |
| 2012 | Lagrange: The Flower of Rin-ne | Izo | Also Season2, Kamogawa Days, specials | |
| 2012 | Arashi no Yoru ni: Himitsu no Tomodachi | Gabu | | |
| 2012 | Medaka Box series | Sotsu Tanegashima | | |
| 2012 | Shirokuma Café | Iwatobi Penguin | | |
| 2012 | Hyōka | Yasukuni Yoshino | | |
| 2012 | La storia della Arcana Famiglia | Debito | | |
| 2012 | Blast of Tempest | Tetsuma Kusaribe | | |
| 2012 | Zetsuen no Tempest | Kusaribe Tetsuma | | |
| 2013–2014 | Cardfight!! Vanguard | Shingo Komoi | Link Joker and Legion Mate | |
| 2013 | Valvrave the Liberator series | Yūsuke Otamaya | | |
| 2013 | Sunday Without God | Hikotsu | | |
| 2013 | The Eccentric Family | Yajiro Shimogamo | | |
| 2013 | Kill la Kill | Houka Inumuta | | |
| 2013 | Hajime no Ippo Rising | Ginpachi Nekota | | |
| 2013 | Gingitsune | Nanami Kosugi | | |
| 2013–2014 | Yowamushi Pedal series | Yasutomo Arakita | | |
| 2013 | Tokyo Ravens | Reiji Kagami | | |
| 2014 | Buddy Complex series | Jarl Duran | | |
| 2014 | Space Dandy | Meow | | |
| 2014 | Majin Bone | Jaguarbone/Antonio | Main Role/Protagonist, 52 Episodes | |
| 2014 | Pokémon: Mega Evolution Special I | Zumi | | |
| 2014 | Haikyū!! series | Hajime Iwaizumi | | |
| 2014 | Dragon Collection | Mosan | | |
| 2014 | Soul Eater Not! | Ox Ford | | |
| 2014 | Free: Eternal Summer | Tadanori Sera | | |
| 2014 | Argevollen | Shouhei Koshikawa | | |
| 2014 | Nobunaga Concerto | Mori Nagayoshi | | |
| 2014 | Rage of Bahamut: Genesis series | Favaro Leone | | |
| 2014 | Yona of the Dawn | Keishuku | | |
| 2014 | Parasyte | Uragami | | |
| 2014 | Shirobako | Taro | | |
| 2014 | Nano Invaders ja:ナノ・インベーダーズ | | | |
| 2015 | Yatterman Night | Galina | | |
| 2015 | Seraph of the End | Seishiro Hiragi | | |
| 2015 | Show by Rock!! | Strawberry Heart | | |
| 2015 | Gin Tama | Takachin | | |
| 2015 | Gangsta | Doug | | |
| 2015 | Classroom Crisis | Yūji Kiryū | | |
| 2016 | Haikyu!! | Iwaizumi Hajime | Season 2 | |
| 2016 | Grimgar of Fantasy and Ash | Ranta | | |
| 2016 | Divine Gate | Ginji | | |
| 2016 | Norn9 | Heishi Otomaru | | |
| 2016 | Nurse Witch Komugi R | Usa-P | | |
| 2016 | Hakuouki Otogisoushi | Heisuke Tōdō | | |
| 2016–2025 | My Hero Academia | Present Mic | | |
| 2016 | Ajin | Masumi Okuyama | | |
| 2016 | Show by Rock!!# | Grateful King | | |
| 2016 | Days (TV) | Hiroyuki Kurusu | | |
| 2016 | Bungo Stray Dogs 2 | Mark Twain | | |
| 2017 | Twin Angel Break | Billy | Ep. 4 | |
| 2017 | Rage of Bahamut: Virgin Soul | Favaro Leone | Ep. 8, 9 | |
| 2017 | Clean Freak! Aoyama-kun | Taichi Yoshioka | | |
| 2018 | Killing Bites | Den Ōnuma | | |
| 2018 | Kokkoku: Moment by Moment | Sako | | |
| 2018–2019 | Captain Tsubasa | Hajime Taki and Mitsuru Sano | | |
| 2018 | Junji Ito Collection | Kuroda, Ryūsuke Fukada, Kishimoto, Piero A, Anzai, Goro | | |
| 2018 | Cells at Work! | Pneumonia Coccus | | |
| 2018–2021 | Zombie Land Saga series | Policeman A | | |
| 2018 | Radiant | Yaga | Ep. 5 - | |
| 2019 | Star Twinkle PreCure | Prunce | | |
| 2019 | Carole & Tuesday | Shakti | | |
| 2019 | Ahiru no Sora | Yukinari Kojima | | |
| 2019 | How Heavy Are the Dumbbells You Lift? | Kutaro Deire | | |
| 2020 | Bakugan: Armored Alliance | Calloway Storm | | |
| 2020 | Sorcerous Stabber Orphen | Hydrant | | |
| 2020 | Japan Sinks: 2020 | Haruki Koga | | |
| 2020 | The Gymnastics Samurai | Tomoki Takizawa | | |
| 2021 | Dragon Quest: The Adventure of Dai | Killvearn, Piroro | | |
| 2021 | Platinum End | Metroyellow | | |
| 2021 | Shaman King | Brocken Meyer | | |
| 2022 | Love All Play | Shōji Okazaki | | |
| 2022–present | Spy × Family | Franky Franklin | | |
| 2022 | Call of the Night | Akihito Akiyama | | |
| 2022 | Tatami Time Machine Blues | Ozu | | |
| 2022 | To Your Eternity | Nixon | Season 2 | |
| 2023 | Junji Ito Maniac: Japanese Tales of the Macabre | Kimata | | |
| 2023 | Sacrificial Princess and the King of Beasts | Bennu | | |
| 2023 | Helck | Kenros | | |
| 2023 | Rurouni Kenshin | Beshimi | | |
| 2023 | A Playthrough of a Certain Dude's VRMMO Life | Ward | | |
| 2024 | Metallic Rouge | Jaron Fate | | |
| 2024 | Go! Go! Loser Ranger! | Shun Tokita | | |
| 2024 | Kaiju No. 8 | Kaiju No. 9 | | |
| 2024 | Code Geass: Rozé of the Recapture | Kristoff | OVA | |
| 2024 | Seirei Gensouki: Spirit Chronicles | Hiroaki Sakata | Season 2 | |
| 2025 | The Red Ranger Becomes an Adventurer in Another World | Abu Dhabi | | |
| 2025–present | My Hero Academia: Vigilantes | Hizashi Yamada/Present Mic | | |
| 2025 | Dandadan | Manjirō | Season 2 | |
| 2025 | Witch Watch | Oboro Namisaki | | |
| 2025 | New Panty & Stocking with Garterbelt | Brief | | |
| 2026 | Daemons of the Shadow Realm | Shokyo | | |

=== Film ===
List of voice performances in feature films
| Year | Title | Role | Notes | Source |
|---|---|---|---|---|
| 2005 | Duel Masters: Curse of the Death Phoenix | Jamira | | |
| 2009 | Eden of the East: The King of Eden | Taishi Naomoto | | |
| 2009 | Yatterman: Shin Yatter Mecha Daishūgō! Omocha no Kuni de Daikessen da Koron! | Gun-chan (Yatterman #1) | | |
| 2009 | Symphony in August; 8月のシンフォニー -渋谷2002～2003 | Shouji Seo | | |
| 2009 | The Rebirth of Buddha 仏陀再誕 | Yuki Unabara | | |
| 2010 | Eden of the East: Paradise Lost | Taishi Naomoto | | |
| 2010 | Mobile Suit Gundam 00 the Movie: A Wakening of the Trailblazer | Allelujah Haptism | | |
| 2010 | Inazuma Eleven the Movie: The Invasion of the Strongest Army Ogre | Yuto Kido | | |
| 2011 | The Prince of Tennis: The British Castle Battle 劇場版 テニスの王子様 英国式庭球城決戦！ | Rin Hirakoba | | |
| 2011 | Inazuma Eleven GO: Kyūkyoku no Kizuna Gurifon | Tsurumasa Hayami, Yuto Kido, Saki Yukio | | |
| 2012 | Case Closed: The Eleventh Striker | Takahiro Sanada | | |
| 2012 | 009 Re:Cyborg | 007 Great Britain | | |
| 2012 | Inazuma Eleven GO vs. Danbōru Senki W | Clark Wonderbot, Yuto Kido | | |
| 2013 | Koitabi: True Tours Nanto 恋旅～True Tours Nanto | Haruki Yokogawa | short film | |
| 2013 | Hakuoki Dai-isshō Kyoto Ranbu | Heisuke Todo | | |
| 2014 | Hakuōki Dai-nishō Shikon Sōkyū | Heisuke Todo | | |
| 2014 | Inazuma Eleven Chou Jigen Dream Match | Yuto Kido | | |
| 2014 | Cardfight!! Vanguard: The Movie | Shingo Komoi | | |
| 2014 | Yowamushi Pedal: Re: Ride | Yasutomo Arakita | compilation film | |
| 2014 | Yowamushi Pedal: Re: Road | Yasutomo Arakita | compilation film | |
| 2015 | Yowamushi Pedal: The Movie | Yasutomo Arakita | | |
| 2017 | The Night Is Short, Walk on Girl | The God of the Old Books Market | | |
| 2019 | Promare | Remi Puguna | | |
| 2020 | Shirobako: The Movie | Tarō Takanashi | | |
| 2023 | Sand Land | Shark | | |

=== Live action ===
List of voice performances in live action film and series
| Year | Title | Role | Notes | Source |
|---|---|---|---|---|
| 2010 | Samurai Sentai Shinkenger vs. Go-onger: GinmakuBang!! | Ayakashi Homurakogi | Movie | |
| 2012 | Tokumei Sentai Go-Busters | Soujikiloid | Ep. 15 | |
| 2013 | Kamen Rider × Kamen Rider Gaim & Wizard: The Fateful Sengoku Movie Battle | Pitcher Plant Monster | Movie | |
| 2018 | Kaitou Sentai Lupinranger VS Keisatsu Sentai Patranger | Togeno Aves | Ep. 14 - 15 | |

=== Video games ===
List of voice performances in video games
| Year | Title | Role | Notes | Source |
|---|---|---|---|---|
| 1997 | Mega Man X4 | Hunter | PS1/PS2 | |
| 1998 | Shōjo Kakumei Utena: Itsuka Kakumeisareru Monogatari 少女革命ウテナ いつか革命される物語 | Schoolboy | Sega Saturn | |
| 1998 | Yarudora series Vol. 1: Double cast ダブルキャスト | Announcer | PS1/PS2 | |
| 2000 | Eve Zero | Kunihiko Sakamoto | PS1/PS2 | |
| 2000 | Eve Zero: Arc of the Matter | Kunihiko Sakamoto | PC | |
| 2000 | Scandal スキャンダル | Baito | PS1/PS2 | |
| 2000 | Love Hina: Ai wa Kotoba no Chuu ni ラブひな～愛は言葉の中に～ | Broadcaster | PS1/PS2 | |
| 2000 | Vandread | Hibiki Tokai | | |
| 2001 | Growlanser III: The Dual Darkness | Orpheus Reed Petersburg オルフェウス・リードブルク | PS1/PS2 | |
| 2002 | Hikaru no Go: Heian Gensou Ibunroku ヒカルの碁 ～平安幻想異聞録～ | Genbu | PS1/PS2 | |
| 2002 | I want to L! Lしたいね！ | Shiyohei Kuramoto, Jun Misumi | PC | |
| 2002 | Hikaru no Go: Insei Choujou Kessen ヒカルの碁 ～院生頂上決戦～ | Mitsuru Mashiba | PS1/PS2 | |
| 2003 | The Twelve Kingdoms road - of standard dust of Guren 十二国記 ～紅蓮の標 黄塵の路～ | Neko Hanju | PS1/PS2 | |
| 2004 | Kūnomori ~ tsuioku no 棲 Mu-kan ~ 空の森 ～追憶ノ棲ム館～ | Mao Nanase | PC Adult | |
| 2004 | Gakuen Prince: Gakuen Seifuku Sengen 学園Prince～学園征服宣言～ | Shogo Kusaka | PC Adult | |
| 2004 | Berserk: Millennium Falcon Hen Seima Senki no Shō | Ishidoro | PS1/PS2 | |
| 2005 | Romancing SaGa: Minstrel Song | Jamil | PS1/PS2 | |
| 2005 | Zettai Fukujuu Meirei 絶対服従命令 | Jens Levin | PC Adult | |
| 2005 | PriPri: Prince X Prince ぷり・プリ～PRINCE×PRINCE～ | Suteran | PC Adult | |
| 2005 | ja:あやかしびと | Keijiro Uesugi | PC Adult | |
| 2005 | 3rd Super Robot Wars Alpha: To the End of the Galaxy | Hazal Gozzo ハザル・ゴッツォ | PS1/PS2 | |
| 2005 | Mar Heaven: Arm Fight Dream メルヘヴン ARM FIGHT DREAM | Giromu | PS1/PS2 | |
| 2006 | Baten Kaitos Origins | Gibari | | |
| 2006 | Blood+ series | Kai Miyagusuku | | |
| 2006 | Cluster Edge | Chrome | PS1/PS2 | |
| 2006 | Utawarerumono | Nuwangi | PS1/PS2 | |
| 2006 | Digimon World Data Squad | Kosaburo Katsura | PS1/PS2 | |
| 2006 | Tennis no Oji-Sama: DokiDoki Survival - Sanroku no Mystic | Rin Hirakoba | PS1/PS2 | |
| 2006 | Hime hibi Princess Days | Masaya Amagitera | PS1/PS2 | |
| 2007 | Tennis no Oji-Sama: DokiDoki Survival - Umibe no Secret | Rin Hirakoba | PS1/PS2 | |
| 2007 | Vitamin X | Kiyoharu Sendo | PS1/PS2 | |
| 2007 | Kekkaishi: Karasumori Ayakashi Kidan 結界師 烏森妖奇談 | Yoshimori Bokumura | DS | |
| 2007 | Lyrical Lyric ja:リリカル♪りりっく | Kohei Shiratori | PC Adult; As Shun Kazama | |
| 2007 | Saint Beast: Rasen no Shou | Byakko no Gai | PS1/PS2 | |
| 2007 | Kekkaishi: kurosusuki-rō no kage 結界師 黒芒楼の影 | Yoshimori Bokumura | Wii | |
| 2007 | Bakumatsu Renka: Karyuu Kenshiden 幕末恋華・花柳剣士伝 | Saburo Miki | PS1/PS2 | |
| 2007 | Jingi Naki Otome 仁義なき乙女 | Ichiro Muto | PC Adult; As Shun Kazama | |
| 2007 | ja:世界でいちばんNGな恋 | Shizuki hachisugana 八須永文太郎 | PC Adult; As Sakiware Chopsticks | |
| 2008 | Your Memories Of: Girl's Style | Taku Kawamoto | PS1/PS2 | |
| 2008 | DS Dengeki Bunko ADV: Baccano! DS電撃文庫ADV バッカーノ！ | Fīro puroshentsu~o フィーロ・プロシェンツォ | DS | |
| 2008 | Kekkaishi: Kokuboro Shurai 結界師 黒芒楼襲来 | Yoshimori Bokumura | DS | |
| 2008 | Mobile Suit Gundam 00 | Allelujah Haptism | DS | |
| 2008 | Yatterman DS: bikkuridokkiri dai sakusenda koron ヤッターマンDS ビックリドッキリ大作戦だコロン | Yatterman #1 | DS | |
| 2008–2014 | Chaos;Head series | Takumi Nishijou | Includes Dual, Noah, Love Chu Chu! | |
| 2008 | Majin Tantei Nougami Neuro: Neuro to Miko no Bishoku Sanmai 魔人探偵脳噛ネウロ ネウロと弥子の美食三昧 推理つき グルメ&ミステリー | Shinobu Godai | DS | |
| 2008 | Jingi Naki Otome Koi Koi Zanmai 仁義なき乙女 恋恋三昧 | Ichiro Muto | PC Adult; As Shun Kazama | |
| 2008 | Yo's Neuro: Supernatural Detective Battle! Culprit set! | Shinobu Godai | PS1/PS2 | |
| 2008 | Inazuma Eleven | Yuto Kido | DS | |
| 2008 | Sands of Destruction | Agan Madaru | DS | |
| 2008 | To Love-Ru Trouble: Doki Doki! Rinkaigakkou-Hen | Saruyama | PSP | |
| 2008 | Mobile Suit Gundam 00: Gundam Meisters | Allelujah Haptism | PS1/PS2 | |
| 2008 | Yattāman DS 2 bikkuridokkirianimaru dai bōken ヤッターマンDS2 ビックリドッキリアニマル大冒険 | Yatterman #1 | DS | |
| 2008 | Shugo Chara! Amunonijiiro Chara Change しゅごキャラ！ あむのにじいろキャラチェンジ | Daichi | DS | |
| 2009 | Tennis no Oji-Sama: Doubles no Oji-Sama - Girls, Be Gracious! テニスの王子様 ダブルスの王子様 GIRLS, BE GRACIOUS！ | Rin Hirakoba | DS | |
| 2009 | VitaminZ | Kiyoharu Sendo | PS1/PS2 | |
| 2009 | Muramasa: The Demon Blade | Onisuke | Wii | |
| 2009 | Toradora! | Koji Haruta | | |
| 2009 | Utawarerumono Portable | Nuwangi | PSP | |
| 2009–2013 | Starry Sky series | Takafumi Inukai | | |
| 2009 | Shugo Chara! Norinori! Chara na Rhythm しゅごキャラ！ ノリノリ！キャラなりズム♪ | Daichi | DS | |
| 2009 | Inazuma Eleven 2 | Yuto Kido | Fire andBlizzard | |
| 2009 | Super Robot Wars NEO | Kakeru Daichi | Wii | |
| 2009 | Luminous Arc 3 | Heine | DS | |
| 2010 | Valkyria Chronicles II | Avan Hardins | PSP | |
| 2010 | Hagane no Renkinjutsushi: Fullmetal Alchemist - Yakusoku no Hi e 鋼の錬金術師 FULLMETAL ALCHEMIST 約束の日へ | Zolf J. Kimblee | PSP | |
| 2010 | Inazuma Eleven 3 | Yuto Kido | | |
| 2010 | Armen Noir アーメン・ノワール | Knives | PS1/PS2 | |
| 2011 | Valkyria Chronicles III | Avan Hardins | PSP | |
| 2011 | Rune Factory: Tides of Destiny | James | | |
| 2011 | Gundam Memories: Memories Of Battle ガンダムメモリーズ ～戦いの記憶～ | Allelujah Haptism | PSP | |
| 2011 | Tennis no Oji-Sama Gyutto! Dokidoki Survival Umi to Yama no Love Passion テニスの王子様 ぎゅっと！ドキドキサバイバル 海と山のLove Passion | Rin Hirakoba | DS | |
| 2011 | Inazuma Eleven Strikers | Yuto Kido | Wii | |
| 2011 | 世界でいちばんNG（ダメ）な恋 ふるはうす | Shizuki hachisugana 八須永文太郎 | PSP; As Sakiware Chopsticks | |
| 2011 | La storia della Arcana Famiglia | Debito | PSP | |
| 2011 | Angelique: Maren no Rokukishi アンジェリーク 魔恋の六騎士 | Walter | PSP | |
| 2011 | Beyond the Future: Fix the Time Arrows | Saw | PS3 | |
| 2011 | Inazuma Eleven GO | Tsurumasa Hayami, Yuto Kido | 3DS | |
| 2011 | Inazuma Eleven Strikers 2012 Xtreme | Tsurumasa Hayami, Yuto Kido, Saki Yukio | Wii | |
| 2012 | Maji de Watashi ni Koi Shinasai! S 真剣で私に恋しなさい！S | Saburo Ishida | PC Adult; As Shun Kazama | |
| 2012 | 12-Ji no Kane to Cinderella: Halloween Wedding; 12時の鐘とシンデレラ～Halloween Wedding～ | Chance | PSP | |
| 2012 | Girl RPG Cinderella IF ガールズRPG シンデレライフ | Yuto Kido | DS | |
| 2012 | Oumagatoki: Kaidan Romance 逢魔時～怪談ロマンス～ | Moegi Hiura | PSP | |
| 2012 | Armen Noir Portable | Knives | PSP | |
| 2012 | Black Wolves Saga: Bloody Nightmare | Auger von Garibaldi | PC | |
| 2012 | Shin Ken to Mahou to Gakuen Mono.: Toki no Gakuen 新・剣と魔法と学園モノ。刻の学園 | Kogoro | PSP | |
| 2012 | Rinne no Lagrange: Kamogawa Days Game & OVA Hybrid Disc 輪廻のラグランジェ 「鴨川ドリームマッチ」 | Izo | PS3 | |
| 2012 | Inazuma Eleven GO 2: Chrono Stone | Tsurumasa Hayami, Yuto Kido, Clark Wonderbot | 3DS | |
| 2012 | Inazuma Eleven GO Strikers 2013 | Tsurumasa Hayami, Yuto Kido, Saki Yukio, Clark Wonderbot, Giorgio Giannini | Wii | |
| 2012 | Black Wolves Saga Last Hope | Auger von Garibaldi | PSP | |
| 2013 | Tasogaredoki: Kaidan Romance 黄昏時～怪談ロマンス～ | Moegi Hiura | PSP | |
| 2013 | Macross 30: Ginga o Tsunagu Utagoe マクロス30 銀河を繋ぐ歌声 | Ganesu Modora | PS3 | |
| 2013–2015 | Norn9 series | Heishi Otomaru | | |
| 2013 | Super Robot Wars Operation Extend | Kakeru Daichi | PSP | |
| 2013 | VitaminR | Tsukasa Asahina | PSP | |
| 2013 | Pokémon series | Croconaw and Feraligatr | 3DS | |
| 2013 | JoJo's Bizarre Adventure: All Star Battle | Vanilla Ice | PS3 | |
| 2013 | Seishun Hajime Mashita! 青春はじめました！ | Heita Saigo | PSP | |
| 2013 | Arcana Famiglia 2: La Storia della Arcana Famiglia アルカナ・ファミリア2 -La storia della Arcana Famiglia- | Debito | PSP | |
| 2013 | Inazuma Eleven GO: Galaxy | Tsurumasa Hayami, Yuto Kido | 3DS | |
| 2013 | Dai Masakitan 大正鬼譚 | Soji Takeya | PSP | |
| 2013 | Jewelic Nightmare | Takumi Sensui, Takumi Emeru | PSP | |
| 2014 | J-Stars Victory Vs | Bossun (Yusuke Fujisaki) | | |
| 2014 | Cardfight!! Vanguard: Lock On Victory!! カードファイト！！ ヴァンガード ロック オン ビクトリー！！ | Shingo Komoi | DS | |
| 2014 | Black Code | Eiresu Georg エイレス＝ゲオルグ | PSP | |
| 2014 | BinaryStar | Nanase Izuki | | |
| 2014 | Haikyu!! Tsunage! Itadaki no Keshiki!! ハイキュー！！ 繋げ！頂の景色！！ | Hajime Iwaizumi | DS | |
| 2014 | Taisho OniTan ~ Gennohasakura ~ 大正鬼譚～言ノ葉櫻～ | Soji Takeya | PSP | |
| 2015 | Kaleidoscope Eve カレイドイヴ | Asahi Ninomiya, Shuya Ninomiya | | |
| 2015 | ROOT∞REXX | Yu Izumi | | |
| 2015 | Yowamushi Pedal: Ashita e no High Cadence 弱虫ペダル 明日への高回転 | Yautomo Arakita | DS | |
| 2015 | Comical Psychosomatic Medicine | Charaotoko | | |
| 2015 | Shin Tennis no Oji-Sama: Go to the Top 新テニスの王子様 ～Go to the top～ | Rin Hirakoba | DS | |
| 2015 | Vamwolf Cross† | Megumidai Naito | | |
| | Xuccess Heaven | Red Academy student | | |
| 2016 | Street Fighter V | Ed | PC/PS4 | |
| 2016 | Magic Kyun! Renaissance | Yuzuru Chitose | | |
| 2017 | Inazuma Eleven Everyday!!+ | Yuto Kido | iOS, Android | |
| 2017 | Yo-kai Watch: Wibble Wobble | Yuto Kido | iOS, Android | |
| 2018 | Fate/Grand Order | Okada Izō 岡田以蔵 | Android/iOS | |
| 2020 | Inazuma Eleven SD | Yuto Kido | Android/iOS | |
| 2020 | Captain Tsubasa: Rise of New Champions | hajime taki | | |
| 2020 | Captain Tsubasa: Rise of New Champions | mitsuru sano | | |
| 2021 | Gate of Nightmares | Roy | Android/iOS | |
| 2023 | Street Fighter 6 | Ed | PlayStation 4/5, Xbox Series X/S, PC, Nintendo Switch 2 | |

=== Drama recordings ===
List of voice performances in audio dramas
| Title | Role | Notes | Source |
|---|---|---|---|
| Gakuen Prince: Division 3: Play of Kiss | Shogo Kusaka | | |
| Asarotte no Omocha | | character songs and CDs | |
| Cinematic Sound Drama GetBackers | Amon Natsuki | | |
| GGBG! | Rei Ejinbara Hitekku レイ＝エジンバラ＝ハイテック | song | |
| Is This a Zombie? | | Drama CD | |
| Is This a Zombie? of the Dead | | Drama CD | |
| Minami-ke | Natsuki Minami | Drama, talk, character CDs | |
| Mirumo de Pon! Charming Drama | | Talk CD | |
| Taiyō no Ie | Oda | Drama CD | |
| Toradora! | | Drama CD | |
| True Tears | | Drama CD | |
| Tonagura | Yuji Kagura | Drama CD | |
| Ranobe Oji Seiya ラノベ王子☆聖也 | Katsumi Sonan | Drama CD | |
| Munasawagi ga Tomaranai 胸さわぎがとまらない | Satoshiko Omori | Drama CD | |

== Dubbing roles ==
=== Live action ===
List of Japanese dubbing performances in live action film and series
| Title | Role | Voice dub for | Notes | Source |
|---|---|---|---|---|
| The 4400 | Danny Farrell | Kaj-Erik Eriksen | | |
| Bullet Train | The Son | Logan Lerman | | |
| Dark Phoenix | Peter Maximoff / Quicksilver | Evan Peters | | |
| Embattled | Quinn Boykins | Colin McKenna | | |
| Empire | Hakeem Lyon | Bryshere Y. Gray | | |
| Free Guy | Mouser | Utkarsh Ambudkar | | |
| Fright Night 2: New Blood | "Evil" Ed Bates | Chris Waller | | |
| The Lost Symbol | Alfonso Nuñez | Rick Gonzalez | | |
| Love Island | Matthew Hoffman | | | |
| Racing Stripes | Stripes | Frankie Muniz | | |
| The Secret of My Success | Brantley Foster/Carlton Whitfield | Michael J. Fox | Netflix edition | |
| Water for Elephants | Kinko / Walter | Mark Povinelli | | |
| X-Men: Apocalypse | Peter Maximoff / Quicksilver | Evan Peters | | |
| X-Men: Days of Future Past | Peter Maximoff / Quicksilver | Evan Peters | | |

=== Animation ===
List of Japanese dubbing performances in animated film and series
| Title | Role | Notes | Source |
|---|---|---|---|
| Charlotte's Web | Wilbur | 2006 dub | |
| Dorothy and the Wizard of Oz | Tin Man | | |
| Meet the Robinsons | Wilbur Robinson | | |
| Spider-Man: Into the Spider-Verse | Peter Porker / Spider-Ham | | |
| Trolls World Tour | Darnell | | |
| Trolls Band Together | Darnell | | |
| Uncle Grandpa | Pizza Steve | | |
| WALL-E | MO | | |

==== Other dubbing ====
- "Miracle Train ~Chūō-sen e Yōkoso~" – Zero Tokyo – Train station promotional character

== Discography ==
=== Singles ===
| Year | Details | Catalog no. | Peak Oricon chart positions |
|---|---|---|---|
| 2014 | Do it: Released: September 17, 2014; Label: Kiramune; Format: CD | LACA-34271 (Limited Edition), LACA-14271 (Regular Edition) | 23 |
| 2016 | Dramatic Surf Coaster: Released: August 3, 2016; Label: Kiramune; Format: CD | LACM-34502 (Limited Edition), LACA-14502 (Regular Edition) | 20 |
| 2019 | Adolescence: Released: July 31, 2019; Label: Kiramune; Format: CD | | 22 |

=== Mini-albums ===
| Year | Single details | Catalog No. |
|---|---|---|
| 2013 | Get Set: Released: August 28, 2013; Label: Kiramune; Format: CD | LACA-35332 |
| 2014 | Peace: Released: October 29, 2014; Label: Kiramune; Format: CD | LACA-35461 |
| 2016 | Cycle: Released: January 27, 2016; Label: Kiramune; Format: CD | LACA-35537 |
