= Cluster Edge =

Japanese media franchise

- Cover art of the DVD.
- Genre: Military sci-fi
- Created by: Hajime Yatate; Masashi Ikeda
- Anime television series
- Directed by: Masashi Ikeda (#1–13); Hitoyuki Matsui (#14–25)
- Produced by: Hideyuki Tomioka; Isao Minegishi; Junka Kobayashi
- Written by: Masashi Ikeda (#1–13); Hiroshi Ōnogi (#14–25)
- Music by: Takayuki Negishi
- Studio: Sunrise
- Licensed by: NA: Sentai Filmworks; (expired)
- Original network: TV Tokyo
- English network: US: Anime Network
- Original run: 4 October 2005 – 28 March 2006
- Episodes: 25
- Manga
- Written by: Wan Komatsuda
- Published by: Hakusensha
- Magazine: Hana to Yume
- Published: 2006
- Volumes: 2
- Video game
- Publisher: Marvelous Interactive
- Genre: Adventure
- Platform: PlayStation 2
- Released: 14 September 2007
- Original video animation

Cluster Edge: Secret Episode
- Directed by: Shinya Watada; Yōichi Fujita; Satoshi Toba
- Written by: Hiroshi Ōnogi; Kaori Yamada
- Music by: Takayuki Negishi
- Studio: Sunrise
- Licensed by: NA: Sentai Filmworks; (expired)
- Released: September 22, 2006
- Runtime: 24 minutes
- Episodes: 3

Cluster Edge (クラスターエッジ, Kurasutā Edji; stylized as CLUSTER EDGE) is an anime television series created by Masashi Ikeda and Sunrise, set around the students that attend a prestigious school.

== Plot ==
Agate Fluorite is the new transfer student at the elite school, "Cluster E.A.", in which the sons of many prestigious families from different countries gather to study together. Soon after, Agate's unexpected antics and enthusiasm in life impress many of his schoolmates, including Beryl Jasper, an honor student who hates his family, but when it is discovered that Agate was involved in a fight, helping a known artificial soldier sympathizer Agate finds himself on the run and eventually without all of his memories intact. Unknown to Agate, he was born with a secret power that can create miracles. With his ability to create miracles not only is the military but the religious sect is after him.

== Characters ==
=== Main characters ===
Agate Fluorite (アゲート・フローライト, Agēto Furōraito)
Voiced by: Hiro Shimono
The God of Judgment.
Beryl Jasper (ベリル・ジャスパー, Beriru Jasupā)
Voiced by: Jun Fukuyama
An honorary student who dislikes his family.
Fon Aina Sulfur (フォン・アイナ・サルファー, Fon Aina Sarufā)
Voiced by: Daisuke Kishio
A young boy who befriends Agate.
Chrome (クロム, Kuromu)
Voiced by: Hiroyuki Yoshino
A leader of the artificial soldiers who shared memories with Chalce.

=== Other characters ===
Chalcedony Renierite (カルセドニー・レニエル, Karusedonī Renieru)
Voiced by: Gō Inoue
Hematite Ramsbeckite (エマタイト・ラムスベック, Emataito Ramusubekku)
Voiced by: Hiroyuki Yoshino
Vesuvia Valentino (ベスビア・バレンチノ, Besubia Barenchino)
Voiced by: Mitsuki Saiga

== Episodes ==
No.	Title	Original release date
1	"A Boy Named Agate"; Transliteration: "Agēto to Iu Na no Shōnen" (Japanese: アゲートという名の少年)	October 4, 2005
Agate is a mysterious, happy-go-lucky boy who has just been enrolled at Cluster E.A., a prestigious academy. On the train ride to Cluster E.A., the train gets caught between a plane battle between Chalce and the military. Agate intervenes to help Chalce and triggers a strange power that pulls the two away from battle.
2	"Sword Of Beryl"; Transliteration: "Beriru no Ken" (Japanese: ベリルの剣)	October 11, 2005
Agate manages to find pieces of his broken plane at the junkyard and finds a way to get to Cluster E.A. with the help of a man he saved earlier. At the academy, he befriends a young boy named Fon, a victim of the military students' bullying. The military school has occupied Cluster E.A. in order to participate in a rival-like competition to determine the schools' reputation; because of the high expectations of the military school needing to win, the military students attempt to kill Beryl. However, Beryl narrowly survives the accident and makes Fon promise not to tell anyone. Despite Beryl's injury, Agate miraculously heals Beryl's arm during the fencing competition, leading him to victory.
3	"Cold Bullet"; Transliteration: "Tsumetai Jūdan" (Japanese: 冷たい銃弾)	October 18, 2005
Vespia, a man from the military, visits Professor Hematite and explains that his friend Chalce has died. He also reveals that he is conducting an investigation as to who helped Chalce during the battle. Hematite researches and discovers that only Agate and Beryl were present at the time. Vespia immediately picks Beryl to blame, knowing that this would ruin Beryl's prestigious reputation. When he confronts Beryl and Hematite, Agate's power reveals that Vespia was the one who murdered Chalce, and in rage, defeats all of Vespia's reinforcements. Unfortunately, Agate is tossed into the river shortly after this happens.
4	"Jet Black Chrome Group Appears!!"; Transliteration: "Shikokku no Kuromu-dan Tōjō" (Japanese: 漆黒のクロム団登場!!)	October 25, 2005
Hematite leaves the academy, troubled with thoughts about Chalce's rebellion against the military. When he returns home, he discovers that his father has gone to one of the old plants used to produce artificial soldiers despite the ban to meet Ludwig from the religious sect. Ludwig explains that many of the soldiers were killed when there was too much emotional stress from the artificial soldiers, and one boy who saw everything escaped from his pod. Meanwhile, Chrome and his group fight against the military in revenge for killing Chalce. When Chrome tries to take down Ludwig, Hematite interferes and Chrome, recognizing who he is, pauses and leaves. Ludwig reveals that because Chalce believed artificial soldiers could develop ethics, he implanted memories and gave Chrome personal morals.
5	"Miracle Race"; Transliteration: "Kiseki no Rēsu" (Japanese: 奇蹟のレース)	November 1, 2005
Agate wakes up and saves an old man from being crushed by a chimney. The old man is grateful for his help and treats him to dinner despite that he is broke. When the restaurant holds the old man captive for being unable to pay his bills, Agate goes to casinos to help raise money for him. His good luck streak lets him win every round, but the greedy casino owner throws him out, fearing that he would be a financial threat to his casino. Agate then resorts to betting in a boat race, in which he pilots boat #8 after its pilot had crashed.
6	"Professor and Fon"; Transliteration: "Kyōju to Fon" (Japanese: 教授とフォン)	November 8, 2005
Fon search for parts leads him to an old aviation museum and a surprise meeting with the Professor who has plans of his own...
7	"Journey to the Past"; Transliteration: "Kako e no Tabi" (Japanese: 過去への旅)	November 15, 2005
Hema recounts changes due to Agate to the students around him, namely Fon and Beryl. Mainly recap on characters from previous episodes.
8	"Student Council Election"; Transliteration: "Seito-kai Senkyo" (生徒会選挙)	November 22, 2005
Fon helps Beryl in his Student council election. However, older and more creative students seem to get the upper hand on them...till Agate shows up, with the military hot on his heels!
9	"Mansion and Ghost"; Transliteration: "Yakata no Bōrei" (Japanese: 館の亡霊)	November 29, 2005
Agate turns up at Chalce's mansion bearing flowers for his late mother, greets his (Chalce) grandmother who takes him as Chalce (keeping the place from greedy relatives) a place for him to rest/ return to. It is a place he seems familiar with yet no one else notices his presence...Is this a case of mistaken identity or some guided destiny?
10	"The Road Of Destiny"; Transliteration: "Unmei no Michi" (Japanese: 運命の道)	December 6, 2005
Recap of previous episodes, on each character's path, destinies connection with Agate.
11	"Respective Feelings"; Transliteration: "Sorezore no Omoi" (Japanese: それぞれの想い)	December 13, 2005
With his appointment as Student Council President, Beryl attempts to discuss about the artificial soldiers issue. However, he is shot down by the majority. Called away by his mother's death, discovers his relatives had volunteered her body for the military scientists due to her survival from an incident which artificial soldiers were decimated by a virus created by the Glian military. As he managed to reclaim her body, reflects on the origin of the soldiers, his mother's involvement, as well as the current Glain supremacy, decides to bring about changes her would have to leave Cluster Academy...
12	"Agate's Cry"; Transliteration: "Agēto no Sakebi" (Japanese: アゲートの叫び)	December 20, 2005
Chrome and Agate heads towards Cluster Edge is shot down by the military. Managing to take refuge in a nearby church. Agate learns of the cost of war, as most in the congregation are the young, old and the woman folk from Chrome. Tracked down by the military, who attacks, regardless of the civilians, killing as well as destroying the church in the process. Disgusted by the carnage, Agate attacks them, driving them away to a nearby forest...as the last attacker falls, falls down in an anguish cry, Chrome sees a vision of a silent Chalce beside him... Meanwhile, Chrome's companions comes across a dead church official with an important looking document...
13	"The Things Chalce Leaves Behind"; Transliteration: "Kārusu no Nokoshita Mono" (Japanese: カールスの遺したもの)	December 27, 2005
Seriously injured from the incident, Agates lies unconscious, taken care of by a former neighbour of Chalce, Sister Rina. She has liked Chalce since young and has witnessed his accidental killing of his father. However, she still admires his nature as well as his subsequent movement on the artificial soldiers issue. Chrome also reflects on how much he has changed since meeting Chalce as a fledgling soldier, moved by his attitude that he allowed himself infused with his memories, becoming his 'brother'. Still Agates tuned in by Rina's fellow sisters, with the reward money saving the orphanage in the process. As Agates taken away, she breaks down as his smile reminded her of Chalce being taken away for the killing.... As the military disappears into the distance, the sun breaks through, turning the once barren fields into lush crops...
14	"Wind to Tomorrow"; Transliteration: "Ashita e no Kaze" (Japanese: 明日への風)	January 10, 2006
Chrome's soldiers tried returning the document but was turned away...hints of its contents about creating a 'sacrificial god'...Recap from ep 11-13.
15	"Letter to Hema"; Transliteration: "Hema e no Tegami" (Japanese: エマへの手紙)	January 17, 2006
Agate's viciously tortured by Vesuvia to use his powers...Meanwhile Hema discovers a diary left to him by Chalce, about his innermost thoughts and his background with the artificial soldiers.
16	"Chrome and Agate"; Transliteration: "Kuromu to Agēto" (Japanese: クロムとアゲート)	January 24, 2006
Chrome rescues Agate from the military, who brings him to Chalce's home for respite, where Chalce's grandmother's home for the occasion. She relates to Chrome the sad part of Chalce's childhood, asks of him for a favour...
17	"Eyes Of Fear"; Transliteration: "Obieta Hitomi" (Japanese: 怯えた瞳)	January 31, 2006
Chrome and Agate stops by at the old town, meeting with old friends as well as interaction with the townsfolk, playing with the orphans. However the rebels sets it ablaze against the military. One of the orphan's trapped in a building. However, Agates use of his 'powers' reminded her of artificial soldiers who has slain her father, runs away from him.
18	"Under The Wings"; Transliteration: "Tsubasa no Moto ni" (Japanese: 翼のもとに)	February 7, 2006
Chrome and Agate managed to infiltrate the school and with the help of Beryl and Hema blend into the student body.
19	"Bond With The Skies"; Transliteration: "Ōzora e no Kizuna" (Japanese: 大空への絆)	February 14, 2006
The religious document falls into the hands of the rebels while the military academy bullies their way to join Cluster Edge's flying competition, which Beryl allows them to.
20	"The Confused Artificial Soldiers"; Transliteration: "Samayoeru Hito Zōhei" (Japanese: さまよえる人造兵)	February 21, 2006
Chrome's soldiers meets with a farmer who helps them...also Fon who they helped and learns of his (Chrome's) current location.
21	"Time for Decision Making"; Transliteration: "Ketsui no Toki" (Japanese: 決意の時)	February 28, 2006
Fon flies for Cluster Edge, wins even as the military school tries to knock his plane from the skies. However, Vesuvia confirming Agate's presence at the event, begins his military attack.
22	"The sorrowful Fury"; Transliteration: "Kanashiki Ikari" (Japanese: 悲しき怒り)	March 7, 2006
Under attack from the military, Chrome reveals himself saving a student from the debris. However, the student was one of those against artificial soldiers, blames the attack on him, causing the rest of the students to pelt Chrome who doesn't retaliate. Agate arrives at the scene, in his fury unwittingly unleashes his power...destroying the school.
23	"A will" Transliteration: "Yuigon" (Japanese: 遺言)	March 14, 2006
More of Agate's origin is revealed from Chalce's diary, of him being made 'Angel's Flesh' which is also used to make artificial soldiers (considered degraded due to the amount of human elements introduced into their creation). He was made to be a 'sacrificial god' to boost a weakened church's power. However, upon meeting Chalce, he obtained his memories became neither human nor god...becoming afraid of his own powers... Meanwhile Rhodo visits Beryl in hospital, wanting him to join forces with him, taunts him with a twisted test...
24	"Prelude of Destruction"; Transliteration: "Hametsu e no Jokyoku" (Japanese: 破滅への序曲)	March 21, 2006
Rhodo starts his attack with his artificial soldiers on the city, while Agate turns himself over to the military in order to help a homeless lady. Vesuvia begins his transfer of his hatred/ jealousy into Agate...
25	"The fire of punishment toward tomorrow" Transliteration: "Sabaki no Hi, Soshite, Ashita e" (Japanese: 裁きの火、そして、明日へ)	March 28, 2006
Agate absorbs Vesuvia's hatred/ jealously, weakening the 'seal' previously put in by Chalace, becoming a 'god of judgement' to destroy the city. Will either Beryl with the special bullet or Chrome with his 'angel's blood' be able to stop his path of destruction?
26	"The Day of Gathering"; Transliteration: "Tsudou Hi" (Japanese: 集う日)	September 22, 2006
Past event about Chalce and Chrome's group, of how the three youngest members came to join them.
27	"White Footmarks"; Transliteration: "Shiroki Ashiato" (Japanese: 白き足跡)	September 22, 2006
Past event about Chalce transfer into Cluster E.A, his meeting with Hema and how he elicted the hatred from the competitive Vesuvia.
28	"Wings of Freedom"; Transliteration: "Jiyū no Tsubasa" (Japanese: 自由の翼)	September 22, 2006
A strange girl appears in Cluster E A, looking for Fon. Is she there for a visit or something else? Will she find her answer amongst Fon and his friends?

=== Theme songs ===
Opening Theme:

1. (Episodes 1–14): "FLY HIGH" by surface
2. (Episodes 15–24): "Bokutachi no kiseki" by Cluster'S
3. (Episode 25): No opening

Ending Theme:

1. (Episodes 1–14): "Kimi to iu na no hikari" by Cluster'S
2. (Episodes 15–24): "Kokoro no tsubomi" by surface
3. (Episode 25): "Kimi to iu na no hikari" by Cluster'S
