= Blast of Tempest =

Japanese manga series

- First tankōbon volume cover, featuring Mahiro Fuwa (left) and Yoshino Takigawa (right)

絶園のテンペスト (Zetsuen no Tenpesuto)
- Genre: Dark fantasy, mystery
- Manga
- Written by: Kyō Shirodaira; Arihide Sano
- Illustrated by: Ren Saizaki
- Published by: Square Enix
- English publisher: Square Enix
- Imprint: Gangan Comics
- Magazine: Monthly Shōnen Gangan
- Original run: July 10, 2009 – March 12, 2013
- Volumes: 10
- Anime television series
- Directed by: Masahiro Andō
- Produced by: Shunsuke Saitō; Yasutaka Kimura; Toshihiro Maeda; Kōsaku Sakamoto; Makoto Furukawa; Gōta Aijima; Noritomo Yoreuchi
- Written by: Mari Okada
- Music by: Michiru Ōshima
- Studio: Bones
- Licensed by: AUS: Madman Entertainment; NA: Aniplex of America; SEA: Muse Communication; UK: MVM Films
- Original network: JNN (MBS, TBS, CBC, BS-TBS)
- Original run: October 5, 2012 – March 29, 2013
- Episodes: 24
- icon

Blast of Tempest (Japanese: 絶園のテンペスト, Hepburn: Zetsuen no Tenpesuto) is a Japanese manga series written by Kyō Shirodaira and Arihide Sano, and illustrated by Ren Saizaki. It was serialized in Square Enix's Monthly Shōnen Gangan from July 2009 to March 2013, with its chapters collected in ten tankōbon volumes. A 24-episode anime television series adaptation by Bones aired from October 2012 to March 2013. The anime series was licensed by Aniplex of America in North America, by Madman Entertainment in Australia and by Muse Communication in Southeast Asia.

== Plot ==
The story revolves around Mahiro Fuwa, a teenage high school student whose younger step-sister Aika (who was also the longtime girlfriend of his childhood friend Yoshino Takigawa) was mysteriously murdered along with their parents one year before. Mahiro is contacted by Hakaze Kusaribe, the leader of the Kusaribe clan who was left stranded on an unknown deserted island by her followers, and agrees to help Hakaze in exchange for her help to find out the culprit responsible for the tragic death of his family. Upon learning of his friend's intentions, Yoshino joins him on his quest to stand up against the rest of the Kusaribe clan who intends to awaken the "Tree of Exodus" whose power can bring ruin to the entire world.

Several dialogues and plot elements in Zetsuen no Tempest pay homage to two works of William Shakespeare, Hamlet and The Tempest, which are two stories about retribution, albeit with completely opposing outcomes.

== Characters ==
=== Main characters ===
Yoshino Takigawa (滝川 吉野, Takigawa Yoshino)
Voiced by: Kōki Uchiyama, Houko Kuwashima (young)
The main viewpoint character of the series. Yoshino is Mahiro's childhood best friend who joins his quest to stop the Tree of Exodus in exchange for the means to avenge for the death of his family. Just like Mahiro, Yoshino cannot overcome Aika's death as he was her boyfriend, a fact he always kept a secret from Mahiro by her request. Yoshino has a more calm and collected character in contrast to Mahiro's reckless behavior, resorting to manipulation and deceit when needed. At the end of the series, he finally accepted Aika's death and formalized his relationship with Hakaze as a means to move on and honor Aika's last wish.
Yoshino's setup and behavior includes allusions to Horatio from Hamlet, who is the eponymous protagonist's closest friend and confidant. It also includes allusions to Ariel from The Tempest, who works behind the scenes and serves as the magician's primary means of communication and obtaining information.
Mahiro Fuwa (不破 真広, Fuwa Mahiro)
Voiced by: Toshiyuki Toyonaga, Yūko Sanpei (young)
A typical high school student and the son of a wealthy entrepreneur, Mahiro is Aika's step-brother and Yoshino's best friend since elementary school. Mahiro's family—consisting of his father, mother, and Aika—were all found dead one year before the beginning of the series. In exchange for help with finding the culprit responsible for killing Aika, Mahiro agrees with Hakaze's plan to stop the resurrection of the Tree of Exodus with Yoshino's help. With little care for the destiny of the world, Mahiro's only desire is to locate and kill the murderer of his family, especially for Aika's sake. Though he is not related to Aika by blood, Mahiro claims he never had any romantic feelings for her, even if his actions imply otherwise.
Mahiro's setup and behavior includes allusions to Prince Hamlet, as just like the main character from Shakespeare's tragedy Hamlet, he is prone to abandon all morals and reason for the sake of exacting his revenge. It also includes allusions to Laertes, the brother of Hamlet's beloved Ophelia who also seeks revenge for the deaths of his father and sister.
Aika Fuwa (不破 愛花, Fuwa Aika)
Voiced by: Kana Hanazawa
Killed one year before, along with her parents, Aika was Mahiro's stepsister and Yoshino's girlfriend who also attended high school at the time of her death. Despite already being dead, both of them are still far from overcoming her loss, with Mahiro determined to avenge her at all costs and Yoshino still claiming he has a lover. Aika is a crucial character along with the main protagonists, it is hinted that she is the one who is the key to many unanswered mysteries surrounding them. It is revealed when Hakaze time travels to a time prior to Aika's death that she was actually the "Magician of Exodus", who, after learning of the future described by Hakaze, decided to take her parents' and her own life to save the world having easily restrained Hakaze who tried to stop her. Her powers were transferred to Megumu Hanemura upon her death.
Aika's character is based on Sycorax, also from The Tempest, which is a deceased character who appears in flashbacks and defines several of the relationships in the play, and Ophelia from Hamlet whose brother gets frenzied by his drive for revenge after her death.
Hakaze Kusaribe (鎖部 葉風, Kusaribe Hakaze)
Voiced by: Miyuki Sawashiro
The leader of the Kusaribe Clan also known as the "Magician of Genesis" with the task of protecting the "Tree of Genesis" which is the source of the magic used by her clan. Betrayed by her aide Samon, who intends to halt the Tree of Genesis' advent by having the Tree of Exodus resurrected first, she is left stranded in a barrel by her former comrades which was washed ashore of a desert island. She uses the last remains of her magic to create a pair of wooden dolls with one of them thrown inside a bottle to the sea and the other in her possession. The doll is found by Mahiro, and she uses it to communicate with him, giving him and Yoshino instructions to confront the Kusaribe Clan and prevent the return of the Tree of Exodus. Hakaze also develops romantic feelings for Yoshino, but refrains from confessing to him upon his claim that he already has a girlfriend, unaware that said girl is the late Aika. At the end of the series, she enters into a relationship with Yoshino.
Hakaze's setup and behavior includes allusions to Prospero, the main character from Shakespeare's play The Tempest, who is a duke with magical power. His brother betrays him and he escapes with his daughter to an island. On this island he makes plans to gain his dukedom back from his brother.

=== Kusaribe clan ===
Samon Kusaribe (鎖部 左門, Kusaribe Samon)
Voiced by: Rikiya Koyama
Hakaze's former aide who usurped her position as the leader of the Kusaribe clan with the intention of awakening the Tree of Exodus to prevent the advent of the Tree of Genesis. Later it is revealed that he did so because he knows that upon fully awakening, the Tree of Genesis will recreate the world, fearing that by doing so, all beings previously created (including mankind) may be destroyed.
Natsumura Kusaribe (鎖部 夏村, Kusaribe Natsumura)
Voiced by: Junichi Suwabe
Samon's right hand man and one of the best magicians of the Kusaribe Clan. He fights armed with a spear.
Tetsuma Kusaribe (鎖部 哲馬, Kusaribe Tetsuma)
Voiced by: Hiroyuki Yoshino
Samon's subordinate and mage of the Kusaribe clan. He is very smart and believes in the reason of the world. He suspected Yoshino as the real "Magician of Exodus" rather than Hanemura due to his suspicious participation in certain events.

=== Other characters ===
Megumu Hanemura (羽村 めぐむ, Hanemura Megumu)
Voiced by: Yūki Kaji
The real current "Magician of Exodus". His powers started manifesting by the time of Aika's death when he was chosen by the Tree of Exodus to replace her and got stronger when the Kusaribe Clan tried to revive it. Unlike the members of the Kusaribe Clan, who are capable only of healing and defensive magic, Megumu's magic is solely focused on destruction and does not need any offerings to be activated. He first appears before Yoshino and Hakaze while looking for the Tree of Exodus, and despite Hanemura is labeled as the greatest threat to her, and was suspicious of being the one who killed Aika, Hakaze decides to train him to ensure that he has the strength to stop the Tree of Genesis should her fears that all mankind will be destroyed when it fully awakens are confirmed. Megumu claims he had a girlfriend, whom he claims is his alibi for the time of Aika's death, but was dumped by her recently. He is unsure if he should save the world for his girlfriend because it might seem uncool. Frauline tracks down his former girlfriend's number and address for him. As the Magician of Exodus, he eventually defeats the Tree of Genesis after the Tree of Exodus was revived.
Evangeline Yamamoto (エヴァンジェリン·山本, Evanjerin Yamamoto)
Voiced by: Nana Mizuki
A Japanese agent working under Takumi to investigate Mahiro and his connection with Hakaze. At first, she finds Yoshino and questions him about Mahiro's whereabouts, but then later makes a deal with him concerning his friend. She is the first person to whom Yoshino confesses that Aika was his girlfriend.
Junichirou Hoshimura (星村 潤一郎, Hoshimura Junichirō)
Voiced by: Hirofumi Nojima
A member of the Kusaribe clan that left to avoid conflict because he dislikes fighting. As the only one Hakaze can really trust, she left him a powerful talisman created from a MP5 sub-machine gun with the power to stop the Tree of Exodus. Currently Junichirou is attending college and true to his pacifist nature; while he is unable to use any magic, he has the ability to deflect attacks of Kusaribe magic, dropping them into the ground should they try to hit him, in a similar fashion to a Judo throw. It is said that not even Hakaze can break through his defenses, leaving his enemies with no options but to give up or to collapse by exhaustion. He is also very perceptive, quickly realizing when Hakaze falls in love with Yoshino.
He has an extreme fetish for women's breasts, which comes up in conversation against the dramatic mood usually set in the anime.
Takumi Hayakawa (早河 巧, Hayakawa Takumi)
Voiced by: Shintarō Asanuma
A high-ranking government official who possesses knowledge about magic due to his ancestor's ties with the Kusaribe Clan. Appointed to deal with the matter of the Tree of Exodus, he falls from grace after all the deaths caused by the Tree of Genesis and starts working together with Samon to look for ways to learn more about the truth behind both trees and their respective magicians including the real threat they can pose to mankind. Due to the government's dire need of knowledge about magic in order to deal with the Tree of Genesis, he was shortly promoted back to his former position.
Mimori Hayashi (林 美森, Hayashi Mimori)
Mahiro's new girlfriend who appeared in the last chapter of the manga.

== Media ==
=== Manga ===
Blast of Tempest is written by Kyō Shirodaira and Arihide Sano, and illustrated by Ren Saizaki. It was serialized in Square Enix's Monthly Shōnen Gangan from July 10, 2009, to March 12, 2013. Two additional chapters were published in the magazine on April 12 and October 12, 2013. Square Enix collected its chapters in ten tankōbon volumes, released from February 22, 2010, to November 22, 2013. In May 2023, Square Enix began to publish the series in English on their Manga Up! Global service.

==== Volumes ====
No.	Release date	ISBN
1	February 22, 2010	978-4-7575-2795-9
2	July 22, 2010	978-4-7575-2935-9
3	December 22, 2010	978-4-7575-3087-4
4	August 22, 2011	978-4-7575-3253-3
5	November 22, 2011	978-4-7575-3409-4
6	May 12, 2012	978-4-7575-3589-3
7	September 22, 2012	978-4-7575-3724-8
8	January 22, 2013	978-4-7575-3852-8
9	May 22, 2013	978-4-7575-3961-7
10	November 22, 2013	978-4-7575-4127-6

=== Anime ===
The anime began airing on MBS (Animeism block) on October 5, 2012. The anime was simulcast with English subtitles on Crunchyroll. It has been licensed by Aniplex of America in North America, by Madman Entertainment in Australia, and by Muse Communication in Southeast Asia. For episodes 1–12, the opening theme is "Spirit Inspiration" by Nothing's Carved in Stone while the ending theme is "happy endings" by Kana Hanazawa. For episodes 13–24, the opening theme is "Even Though I Love You" (大好きなのに, Daisuki na no ni) by Kylee while the ending theme is "Our Song" (僕たちの歌, Boku-tachi no Uta) by Tomohisa Sako.

==== Episodes ====
No.	Title	Original release date
1	"The Mage in the Barrel" "Mahoutsukai ha, Taru no Naka" (Japanese: 魔法使いは、樽の中)	October 5, 2012
Hakaze Kusaribe, the Magician of Genesis, awakens on a deserted island after being abandoned there inside a barrel. Some time later, while visiting the grave of his girlfriend Aika Fuwa, Yoshino Takigawa is confronted and threatened by a woman named Evangeline Yamamoto who asks him about the whereabouts of his friend, Aika's brother Mahiro. Mahiro arrives at the scene, and the two escape just as almost everyone else is afflicted by a strange disease that turns its victims' bodies into metal.
2	"He Said She Was Very Beautiful" "Kanojo wa Totemo Kireidatta, to Shounen wa Itta" (Japanese: 彼女はとてもきれいだった、と少年は言った)	October 12, 2012
Yoshino learns from Mahiro that he accepted Hakaze's offer to find Aika's murderer for him in exchange for helping her stop the resurrection of the Tree of Exodus, which is being orchestrated by Samon, the man who betrayed Hakaze and ordered her exile. Upon using magic to track the culprit, they learn that somehow there are no traces leading to the perpetrator, which leads them to believe that a member of the Kusaribe Clan is responsible. As the duo wanders through the ravaged city looking for more magic talismans left behind by Hakaze, they come across Samon's aide Natsumura and, ignoring Hakaze's orders, Mahiro confidently confronts him head on.
3	"There Are Things Even Magic Cannot Do" "Dekinai Koto Wa, Mahou Ni Mo Aru" (Japanese: できないことは、魔法にもある)	October 19, 2012
Mahiro has a hard time fighting Natsumura while Yoshino learns from Hakaze how to activate the talismans. Yoshino manages to regroup with Mahiro and drive off Natsumura.
4	"The Cursed Pair" "Batsu-atari, Futari" (Japanese: 罰あたり、ふたり)	October 26, 2012
Mahiro and Yoshino take shelter in an abandoned house. As Yoshino prepares food for them, he reveals to Hakaze the history of how they met and became friends.
5	"Everything Happens For a Reason" "Subete no Koto ni wa, Wake ga Aru" (Japanese: 全てのことには、わけがある)	November 2, 2012
While looking for more talismans, Yoshino and Mahiro are confronted by members of the Kusaribe Clan led by Samon's aide Tetsuma. After they manage to escape, the duo meets Hakaze's friend Junichirou Hoshimura to fetch a powerful talisman she left with him. Much to their surprise, Junichirou reveals to them that Hakaze is in fact already dead, a fact that he personally confirmed.
6	"The Paradox of the Skull" "Mujun Suru, Tōgai" (Japanese: 矛盾する、頭蓋)	November 9, 2012
Still wondering about Junichirou's revelation, Yoshino and Mahiro take the special talisman he gave them and prepare themselves to confront Samon directly, but Yoshino is captured by the Japanese Army and while he has another meeting with Evangeline, Mahiro confronts the military to rescue him.
7	"First Kiss" "Fasuto Kisu" (Japanese: ファースト · キス)	November 16, 2012
Once again reunited, Mahiro and Yoshino take shelter in an abandoned bus, where Yoshino reminisces about his days with Aika when she was still alive.
8	"The Hour of the Princess' Suppression" "Majo wo Tatsu, Jikan" (Japanese: 魔女を断つ、時間)	November 23, 2012
As the Japanese forces gather around the Tree of Exodus near Mt. Fuji, Mahiro and Yoshino take advantage of their attack to bypass the barrier protecting it. But before them and the tree lies Samon, who shows them Hakaze's skeleton. Hakaze learns that she is already dead and contacting them from the past. Samon also reveals that his true objective is to prevent the revival of the Tree of Genesis, which, according to him, is a bigger threat to the world than the Tree of Exodus.
9	"Boyfriend" "Kareshi" (Japanese: 彼氏)	November 30, 2012
Believing that Hakaze cannot help him anymore now that she is dead, Mahiro strikes a bargain with Samon instead, promising to surrender in exchange for having Aika's murderer delivered to him. Meanwhile, Natsumura confronts the military, subduing all opposition until Evangeline, armed with some talismans, appears to challenge him. Remembering Aika's words about Shakespeare's play The Tempest and its coincidences with the current situation, Yoshino convinces Mahiro to terminate his deal with Samon and rejoin Hakaze's side should Yoshino find a way to bring her back. In exchange, he promises to reveal the identity of Aika's boyfriend.
10	"How to Make a Time Machine" "Taimu Mashin no Tsukurikata" (Japanese: タイムマシンのつくり方)	December 7, 2012
As the conflict with the military intensifies, Yoshino make use of all the information at his hand to prove that there is indeed a way for Hakaze to be brought back to the present as part of a countermeasure devised by Samon himself to ensure that he could count on her help should his plans go wrong.
11	"Daughter of Time" "Toki no Musume" (Japanese: 時の娘)	December 14, 2012
Junichirou confronts Natsumura to protect Evangeline as the rest of the army falls down by the Iron Sickness. Meanwhile, Samon confirms Yoshino's suspicion that there is a way for Hakaze to be rescued by having the rest of her body leave her skeleton behind in the island and fuse herself with the skeleton currently in their possession. While Hakaze searches the island for an offering left there to perform the ritual, Samon is informed that no member of the Kusaribe Clan had killed anyone recently, which clears all suspicions upon them regarding Aika's murder. Upon hearing of this, Hakaze concludes that her death could only be the work of a magician whose power does not come from the Tree of Genesis, but from the Tree of Exodus instead.
12	"Absent Thee from Felicity Awhile" "Shibashi ten no Shukufuku yori Toozakari......" (Japanese: しばし天の祝福より遠ざかり･･････)	December 21, 2012
With no conclusive evidence about who may be Aika's murderer, Hakaze looks for the offering with no success until a missile lands on the island thanks to the Tree of Genesis' providence, which she uses to perform the ritual to switch her skeleton on the island with the future skeleton beside Yoshino and safely reach Mt. Fuji. Just as she arrives, the Tree of Genesis starts spreading its branches through the entire world, destroying all man-made objects it touches and attacking the Tree of Exodus. Before Hakaze come up with a plan to calm down both trees, both Mahiro and Yoshino are critically wounded by their attacks and she turns her attentions to saving them with Samon's help instead.
13	"Philosophy of Dreams" "Yume no Kotowari" (Japanese: 夢の理)	January 11, 2013
Mahiro has a nightmare regarding all events so far and the first person he meets upon waking up is Samon who reveals to him that one month has passed since the Tree of Genesis awakened. As Samon asks Mahiro if he could kill Yoshino if necessary, a construction worker hears rumors about the Mage of Exodus and reveals his magic abilities to a co-worker, and contemplating whether or not he is the one.
14	"Happy New Year" "Akemashite Omedetou" (Japanese: あけましておめでとう)	January 18, 2013
It's New Year's Day and Mahiro is brought by Samon to his associates to discuss his proposal. As they question the potential threat Yoshino can be due to Hakaze's newfound infatuation and trust on him, the pair travel around Japan looking for the remaining fruits of the Tree of Exodus. After paying a visit to Aika's grave, Hakaze and Yoshino come across Megumu Hanemura, the same boy from the construction site and learn about his powers. Hakaze then challenges him to measure his powers and to see if he may be Aika's killer as they suspected.
15	"You Seem to Be Plotting Something" "Naniyara Takurande iru Yōdeari" (Japanese: 何やら企んでいるようであり)	January 25, 2013
Megumu is brought before Mahiro and the others who questioned him about his alibi during the time of Aika's death. As Takumi and Samon devise a plan to use Megumu's powers in their favor, Mahiro spars with him to increase his ability. Meanwhile, Junichiro got Hakaze to realize that she has fallen in love with Yoshino.
16	"The Wandering Apparition" "Haikai suru Bōrei" (Japanese: 徘徊する亡霊)	February 1, 2013
Following Samon and Takumi's plan, Megumu performs a public demonstration of his powers where he destroys a huge branch of the Tree of Genesis before a huge crowd. Meanwhile, Hakaze is informed about a spy appearing at the Kusaribe Clan's village and departs there with Yoshino to investigate. Still in anxiety regarding her feelings for him, Hakaze finds herself in a dire situation when one of the village's children is held hostage in a possible attempt to have the clan reveal their magic powers. Despite seeing Yoshino risking his life to save the child, Evangeline, Natsumura and Tetsuma just watch from afar as they are suspicious that he may be somehow related to the Tree of Exodus.
17	"Marine Snow" "Marinsunō" (Japanese: マリンスノー)	February 8, 2013
Megumu travels around the world destroying branches of the Tree of Genesis while stirring up the public opinion and the commotion caused by him allows Takumi to regain his position in the Japanese government. Meanwhile, Hakaze is still in distress due to her feelings for Yoshino, and worries about the safety of his girlfriend. As Samon, Mahiro, Junichiro and Megumu discuss how to deal with the possibility of Yoshino being connected to the Tree of Exodus, they deliberate about who may be Yoshino's secret girlfriend to have some leverage over him and no conclusive evidence is found until Megumu expresses his suspicions about said girl being Aika, which Yoshino confirms to Hakaze after she confesses her feelings for him.
18	"The Dancing Princess" "Maihime" (Japanese: 舞姫)	February 15, 2013
Upon learning that Yoshino's girlfriend was Aika, Hakaze starts blaming the Tree of Genesis for her death and decides to aid Samon's plan. When Megumu appears to destroy another branch, a disguised Hakaze appears before him to test his powers and soon after she flees, allowing him to destroy the branch and stir up further the public opinion. Meanwhile, Takumi, Evangeline and Tetsuma discuss about the mysterious stone found in the Kusaribe Village and its connection with both trees. Upon learning that Mahiro has finally awakened, Yoshino departs to meet him, knowing that the time has come to tell him all the truth about his relationship with his sister.
19	"The Object of Desire" "Negatta Mono wa" (Japanese: 願ったものは)	February 22, 2013
As the full resurrection of the Tree of Exodus is at hand, at last Mahiro and Yoshino come face to face and both express to each other their true feelings toward Aika. But while Yoshino is still determined to prevent that Aika's death may result in another tragedy, Mahiro still upholds his resolve to enact revenge at any costs. Once again reunited with the others, Hakaze announces her plan to return to the past in order to find out at last who killed Aika and why.
20	"Who Did It?" "Fūdanitto (Dare ga Yatta ka)" (Japanese: フーダニット （誰がやったか）)	March 1, 2013
By the same method she used to travel from the past to the present, Hakaze returns to the past on the same island where she was left stranded and makes use of the offering left there by Samon to return to civilization. Just a few hours left before the time of Aika's death, Hakaze meets with her by chance and much to her astonishment, she learns that the original Mage of Exodus is none other than Aika herself.
21	"Femme Fatale" "Famu Fatāru (Unmei no Onna)" (Japanese: ファム·ファタール （運命の女）)	March 8, 2013
A huge branch of the Tree of Genesis appears in the middle of the ocean, which Samon and the others conclude to be the tree's main core. Meanwhile, in the past, Aika learns the whole truth from Hakaze and decides that to ensure that the present stay unaltered and her powers are transferred to Megumu, she must commit suicide. Hakaze tries to stop her to prevent Mahiro and Yoshino from suffering, while Aika claims that she intends to kill herself with the sole purpose of protecting them. After a vicious confrontation, Hakaze is defeated and knocked unconscious. Upon awakening, Hakaze rushes to Aika's house just to find her already lifeless body and a letter addressed to her, containing a message that shall be delivered to Mahiro and Yoshino once the Tree of Genesis is destroyed.
22	"Aika Fuwa" "Fuwa Aika" (Japanese: 不破愛花)	March 15, 2013
Once returned to the present, Hakaze explains to the others the truth about Aika's death and the Tree of Genesis. Much to the others' surprise, neither Mahiro nor Yoshino seems surprised or angry with Aika's decision to commit suicide, nor do they blame Hakaze or anyone else for what happened, but they are curious about the content of her final message to them. Meanwhile, the world's most powerful nations decide to protect the Tree of Genesis and establish a naval defense perimeter around its main core, in case of an attack by the Mage of Exodus. Upon learning about the situation, Mahiro come up with a plan to have Megumu reach the core and destroy it without bringing casualties to the fleet. As Mahiro and Yoshino reminisce about their first meeting with Aika, their friends prepare themselves for the final battle against the Tree of Genesis.
23	"The Battle of Genesis" "Hajimari no Tatakai" (Japanese: はじまりの戦い)	March 22, 2013
Although they apparently have no need to involve themselves further, Mahiro and Yoshino convince Hakaze and the others to let them assist with the task of destroying the Tree of Genesis. With Hakaze and Megumu distracting the naval forces according to Mahiro's plan, the others manage to hijack the small boats positioned closer to the main core and take them away to safety. However, as Megumu approaches the Tree and prepares himself to deal the final blow, one of the captives manages to draw a pistol and shoot at Yoshino.
24	"To Each, Their Own Tale" "Sorezore no Monogatari" (Japanese: それぞれの物語)	March 29, 2013
Despite being shot in the arm, Yoshino, together with Mahiro and the others, manage to draw away the naval fleet and allow Megumu to face the Tree of Genesis with no distractions. When Megumu is about to be defeated, the Tree of Exodus transforms itself into a giant sword, which he uses to destroy the Tree of Genesis for good. One month after the trees disappeared, Takumi provides assistance to the now powerless Kusaribe Clan. Megumu finds the courage to reconcile with his girlfriend and they start dating again. Mahiro and Yoshino learn the contents of Aika's final message, in which she thanks the two for everything they've done with her and asks them to move on with their lives. As the two leave Aika's grave Mahiro tells Yoshino that he is dating a girl he saved from the Iron Syndrome. As they exit the cemetery, Yoshino spots Hakaze in front of the entrance to the cemetery, and the two run to each other as the screen goes to black.

== See also ==
- Spiral: The Bonds of Reasoning, another manga series written by Kyo Shirodaira
- In/Spectre, a novel series written by Kyo Shirodaira
