= List of Sket Dance characters =

This is a list of characters from the anime and manga series Sket Dance by Kenta Shinohara.

== Main characters ==
=== The Sket-dan ===
Bossun (ボッスン) / Yusuke Fujisaki (藤崎 佑助, Fujisaki Yūsuke)

- Voiced by: Hiroyuki Yoshino

The team leader, an expert marksman and artist whose usually erratic personality is replaced with a brilliant deductive mindset by ceremonially donning goggles in a process called 'Concentrate'—this allows him to make eerily accurate inferences by concentrating entirely on absolutely all the available evidence, to the extent of accurately recalling background noise. He enjoys the sense of adventure he receives from helping others for its own sake, but can become very emotionally involved with more serious cases to the extent of verbally abusing those he sees to be betraying their friends. Despite Bossun's deceptively sharp acumen, he is notably socially awkward around attractive women. He frequently breaks the Fourth Wall; he also vocally guards his position as the protagonist of the series when sidelined. However, when he won the Character Popularity contest (which had a whole chapter based around it), he was extremely humble about it.

On his fifteenth birthday, he discovered that he was not related to his mother, Akane, and his sister, Rumi. His actual parents were Akane's best friends, Ryousuke and Haru. When Bossun was about to be born, his parents died in two separate accidents. His father died while saving a child, and his mother died from giving birth. He ran away from home and wandered around aimlessly. After meeting Taisuke Mishima, the child who his father had saved, Bossun received the present that Ryousuke had meant to give to Haru after the birth. Bossun read the letters, saying about how he should help other people. However, in anger, he flung down the letters and claimed that he would only live for himself. After watching a student his age be bullied (it was actually Tsubaki, but he had longer hair and glasses then, so they didn't recognize each other after they met again), he discovered that he had truly inherited his parents' blood because he couldn't resist helping other people. He, later on, returned to Akane and Rumi, and continued to live with them. Bossun continued to believe that he was alone in the world, before the doctor who had helped deliver him came to him on his 17th birthday and told him that he had a younger twin brother. As a result, he realized that his brother was actually Tsubaki Sasuke from the Student Council. Bossun felt deep down that he had already known because everybody kept saying that they were similar. Despite knowing that they were brothers, both Tsubaki and Bossun continue to have an awkward rivalry with each other, often breaking into fights, but slowly getting closer, as brothers should. He also has inherited some behavior from Akane having shown that whenever she yells at Bossun at some point she would end up saying "dummy" repeatedly. He has shown a great assortment of talents, such as being able to draw as well as a manga artist, able to make origami be extremely lifelike, and being excellent at riddles, the second-best in the school. He is the older twin of Tsubaki, he is slightly lazier and childish than him, but he can be mature when in a serious case, also he is more creative than Tsubaki. In the last chapter of the manga, he graduated from Kaimei High School and Himeko revealed her true feelings for him. He is last seen living in the United States helping two children crying near a road.

Himeko (ヒメコ) / Hime Onizuka (鬼塚 一愛, Onizuka Hime) / Onihime (鬼姫)

- Voiced by: Ryoko Shiraishi

The "Amazon"- a dangerous close-range fighter who serves as the Sket Dan's muscle using her hockey stick. Already a formidable fighter without it, with this weapon she is capable of defeating multiple opponents instantaneously. In the past, Himeko, was just a tomboy from Osaka. When her family moved to Tokyo, she found it hard to find friends, even on the Hockey team. This changed when Arisa Kanou (referred to as Aa-chan), a member of the team started befriending her. One day, Himeko saw her friend Aa-chan threatened by the school's delinquents, the rest of her friends told her to ignore it, but Himeko refused and went to protect her. The delinquents got into a fight, in which Himeko was losing but did not give in stating she would protect her friend. But the delinquent simply mocked her, stating Aa-chan was not threatened at all and that in fact, she was the leader of the gang. This shocking fact along with Aa-chan cursing at her, made Himeko go wild and she grabbed a hockey stick and beat everyone. Aa-chan spread rumors that she was an ogress, and Himeko was slowly isolated from the school, while other delinquents came to fight her, all of whom she defeated. She gained the nickname "Legendary Yankee Onihime", which quickly became a symbol of "power and fear". Eventually tired of this life she transferred to another school at a distance from her house which was the one Bossun attended. She spent her days isolated, due to her experiences with Aa-chan, deciding to never have friends. But Bossun, and the class representative, Takahashi Chiaki attempted to correct this behavior by attempting to be her friend. When Chiaki gets into trouble, with some delinquents, she is reluctant to help Chiaki, due to her past experiences. Bossun scolds her at this, that despite her experiences she should not be so unwilling to trust people and that he would never betray a friend. Hearing this she quickly went to beat up the delinquents threatening Chiaki, but not before being saved by Bossun. She then, reveals her nickname, but to her surprise neither Bossun nor Chiaki are frightened. She states that she has hurt too many people, but Bossun states her strength is not something to be ashamed, but proud of, and asks her to be part of Sket-dan. Recently, memories of an unknown boy in a school uniform have prevented her from fully enacting these violent impulses Himeko feels that she is saved from Bossun and becomes loyal to him despite their constant bickering. Obsessed with bizarre flavors of lollipop such as 'Mackerel-Miso' which can almost kill anyone without a powerful "fighting spirit" who tries eating them, she almost constantly has one sticking out of her mouth, which is frequently mistaken for a habit of smoking from a distance. Despite her weird sense of taste, she is also very good at cooking. She holds great faith in Bossun, as she, like Switch is willing to do anything Bossun says, and has shown feelings for Bossun, as shown by her jealousy when he went on a group date and being embarrassed, when on a fake date with him, In 'Himekoi' chapter it is fully seen that she does have a crush on Bossun and nearly confessing it but fail (just like in the last chapter of 'Trouble travel'). She has a great love for cute things, as seen when she acted motherly for Bossun when he was a child due to Mr. Chūma's youth potion, even fainting from how cute Bossun was. She has shown great interest to have Bossun and Tsubaki improve their brotherly relationship, which she shares with Switch, and the Student Council, with the exception of Tsubaki. In the last chapter, she graduated and finally made her true feelings to Bossun known, but without receiving any clear reciprocation from him on her confession. She is last seen as an adult with slightly longer hair.

Switch (スイッチ, Suicchi) / Kazuyoshi Usui (笛吹 和義, Usui Kazuyoshi)

- Voiced by: Tomokazu Sugita, Aki Kanada (young)

The 'brains' of the team (in contrast to Bossun's intuition and Himeko's brawn) in charge of intelligence-gathering and, in contrast to the more excitable other Sket Dan members, largely concerned with "honest, data-substantiated fact". He originally was very different from his current self, his huge change is due to the death of his little brother, which he blames himself for. Originally, he was far more normal, but had an inferiority complex about his little brother Switch, who had talents that far surpassed his, despite being very proud of him. This complex was further emphasized when their childhood friend Sawa acted like she was more interested in his little brother, when in reality they had mutual feelings. When Sawa was being stalked, he originally was going to protect her, but felt useless in front of his younger brother and let him take his place. He went for a walk and met a friend of Sawa and told her Sawa was going out with Switch. Then he spotted the stalker, but found out that he was only an admirer. Kazuyoshi realized that Sawa's friend was the true culprit who planned to hurt Sawa. By the time he arrived, his little brother had been murdered after protecting Sawa. After his brother's death, he takes on his appearance and name because he feels responsible for his death, and stops speaking shortly after until Bossun comes to his aid. Kazuyoshi never speaks aloud (his trauma causing a severe form of selective mutism) and instead uses his laptop to communicate using the "Speech Synthesis Software" his brother developed to communicate in between constant bouts of forum trolling and dating-simulation play throughs. Switch is the proprietor of a vast school-wide intelligence network consisting largely of perverts and outcasts, and thus in possession of almost unlimited information on everyone in the vicinity of the school; the ensuing potential for blackmail makes him a bad person to cross. Surprisingly popular with the ladies, he expresses interest in very little outside of his Sket Dan duties - except, curiously, for frequent 'Science vs. the Supernatural' debates with occult fanatic Yuuki Reiko which seem to be sparked by mutual attraction. Beyond computer skills, Switch has shown frequent and unexplained access to high-tech gear such as computerized training equipment and minute homing devices. He hates Otaku, despite being one. He is completely loyal to Bossun: as he states, they feel indebted to Bossun for his guidance, and wants to be useful to him. In the last chapter, he delivers the graduation speech on behalf of his graduating class – coming to terms with his past by finally letting go off his laptop and speaking in public with his actual voice again. He is last seen as an adult, highly implied to be dating Momoka.

== Recurring characters ==
=== Student Council members ===
The Kaimei High School Student Council, occasional rivals and later allies of the Sket-dan, uphold school rules and handle administrative duties, like the creation and funding of clubs. Within the Sket Dance world, there is a manga series about them, running in Shōnen Jump, and a tie-in game on Vivage City, a cellular phone game company.

Sōjirō Agata (安形 惣司郎, Agata Sōjirō)

- Voiced by: Tomokazu Seki

President of the Student Council and a third-year student. He later steps down from president when he graduated and passes the torch to Tsubaki (as of chapter 147-148). A very cool, charismatic, laid-back individual, who seemingly does nothing as President. He entrusts most responsibilities to the Vice President, Sasuke Tsubaki. He is well-known for his intelligence. His IQ is around 160. Due to his high IQ, he is the best at riddles in school. His ability to read and understand people is used to manipulate them to do what he wants, such as motivating Bossun into competing with him seriously. This same ability is why he has the complete loyalty of Student Council members, Sasuke and Daisy. His performance in the Gachinko Vivage Battle's "Pixie Garden" match with Bossun shows that he is a good strategist, who learns quickly, and is adept at lying, being regarded as the antagonist comic of the manga / series Sket Dance. Despite his ruthlessness, and professions that he is very cunning, he's against cheating to win. He has a tendency to forget things he's said, such as the bet he pretended to make with Bossun to get him fired up. He is very lazy, known to sleep in the counsel's classroom. He is very protective of his sister and will become enraged if any guy gets close to her, which is shown in his misunderstanding of her relationship with Tsubaki. He has a unique laughter "kakaka".

Sasuke Tsubaki (椿 佐介, Tsubaki Sasuke)

- Voiced by: Takahiro Sakurai (drama CD), Hiro Shimono (anime)

The Vice President of the Student Council, who takes his responsibilities very seriously, even overzealously, willing to punch a hole in a wall and injure himself to get his point across. He later becomes President after Agata graduated (chapter 147/148). He believes that the Sket-dan is useless and should be abolished, leading to conflicts with Bossun. The two consider each other rivals and his desire to defeat Bossun and the Sket-dan motivate him to do things he wouldn't otherwise do. He is a skilled fighter, and the boxing club at their school wanted him on their team. He often blushes when he feels shy. He also researches his opponents' weaknesses and uses them to his advantage. He is very similar to Bossun, as many other people had noted. He can be as excellent as Bossun when it comes to solving riddles as the two have obtained similar answer for the last question during the quiz battle between Student Council and Quiz Club. It was later revealed that Tsubaki and Bossun are twin brothers, separated from birth. After the discovery, Tsubaki and Bossun's relationship became even more awkward, but they slowly began to grow closer, with Bossun even inviting Tsubaki over for dinner to meet Akane and Rumi. Akane noted that while Bossun looked more like his father, Ryousuke, Tsubaki looked more like his mother, Haru. He is the younger twin of Bossun, also he is slightly diligent and maturer than him, but can be childish sometimes, often when both of them are fighting, but he lacks creativity, unlike Bossun who is more creative than him. In the last chapter, he graduated. He is last seen studying at a doctor college while wearing the Sket Dance logo T-Shirt.

Mimori Unyū (丹生 美森, Unyū Mimori)

- Voiced by: Atsuko Enomoto (drama CD), Megumi Takamoto (anime)

The Treasurer of the Student Council. Later become Vice-President after Tsubaki became president. She's a very gentle girl and the wealthy granddaughter of the Unyuu Group's leader. She is competent enough to know how to allocate hidden funds for the Student Council, but this is countered by her desire to spend frivolously. She believes money is a means to all ends, from love confessions to winning competitions. Despite this, she considers herself an advocate of proper conduct, and even lectures Tsubaki for his uncivilized actions. Outside of her financial duties, she provides refreshments and first aid supplies to the other Student Council members.

Kikuno Asahina (浅雛 菊乃, Asahina Kikuno)

- Voiced by: Aya Endō (drama CD), Yu Kobayashi (anime)

The Secretary of the Student Council, nicknamed "Daisy-chan." She is a Second-year student Sket Dance, who will do whatever Sōjirō tells her to do, from participating in the Gachinko Vivage Battle Tournament to going undercover on a Student Council Operation to catch a ring of blackmailers. She speaks harshly, and insults people on purpose, often saying things like "Drown in a gutter and die", or "Drown, die, revive, and die again." She has good aim, and relentlessly attacks without hesitation. While she seems calm and composed on the outside, she is quick to judge others, and thus, underestimate them. She doesn't handle failure very well, and will console herself by cuddling stuffed animals. She especially dislikes bothering other people, so she rarely asks for help.

Michiru Shinba (榛葉 道流, Shinba Michiru)

- Voiced by: Kōsuke Toriumi (drama CD), Kenji Nojima (anime)

A Student Council Member responsible for General Affairs, and a Third-year Student. Later graduates. He is a narcissist, who loves having his picture taken. He is popular with girls, and also has a very devoted fan club called the "Shinbals". He is an extremely good chef, considered "exceptional even among professionals." Michiru often plays the straight man opposite the quirks of the other student council and is also one of the few people who understands that Sōjirō has a manipulative side. He has been together with Agata since middle school and knows him very well among others.

Kiri Katō (加藤 希里, Katō Kiri)

- Voiced by: Ryōta Ōsaka (anime)

The new General Affairs Manager after Shinba graduates. First appeared in chapter 152, he is said to be a decedent from ninjas. He has a strong sense of justice and makes excuses because he doesn't want people to know that he is a ninja. He purposely let himself get hit by a ball to hide his abilities. He later helped Sket-Dan catch Kagerou, a thief pretending to be a ninja. His goal is to make the school his. Originally not listening to Tsubaki, and even considering him unfit to be president, he did things his own way due to an incident back in middle school where he lost faith in relying on others. After Tsubaki stood up for him and promised not to abandon him, he has become fiercely protective of him and more willing to work with others. His and Tsubaki's relationship is often juxtaposed with that Himeko and Bossun's, being the loyalty they feel towards their respected leaders.

Hani Usami (宇佐見 羽仁, Usami Hani)

- Voiced by: Yuka Iguchi (anime)

The new Treasurer as of chapter 153. She does not like men since she grew up in an all-women environment all her life. An example of this would be that she wants to expel all the male students. She won't even talk to them and has a snobby princess attitude. When she is touched by men, she turns into her alter ego, Bunny. Bunny is the polar opposite of her counterpart, Hani. She hates women and has a lust for men, even becoming more erotic and seductive towards them. When she is touched by women, however, she turns back into Hani.

=== Kaimei High School faculty ===
Tetsuji Chūma (中馬 鉄治, Chūma Tetsuji)

- Voiced by: Hayato Nakata (drama CD), Jouji Nakata (anime)

The little-seen and inhumanly apathetic "Club Supervisor" of the Sket Dan spends most of his time in his lab instead of minding them, where his only gift seems to be for creating dangerous and unstable explosive devices. Despite this, he has created potions of science fiction effect, such as a youth potion and potions able to change a person's personality. As his token support is prerequisite to Sket Dan's existence, he holds the threat of its withdrawal over the members' heads when he wishes to coerce them into some unreasonable 'favour'. He is often referred to as "Chu-san". He has a daughter named Suzu.

Remi Misora (美空 レミ, Misora Remi)

- Voiced by: Sakura Tange

Remi is often referred to as "Onee-san". She took over as teacher's assistant after the previous one went on maternity leave. She is very scatter brained and clumsy but very happy and energetic as she was formerly a host of the educational children's show "Can Mommy Come Too?". She fell in love with Chu-san.

Kunio Yamanobe (山野辺 邦夫, Yamanobe Kunio)

- Voiced by: Nobuyuki Hiyama

An eccentric geography teacher who hires the Sket Dan to help him form a 'Genesis' club ('Genesis' being the name of a ball game taught to him by 'Master Won' similar to tennis, but involving a volleyball, and fishing nets), the idea was receded when Tsubaki explained that if the three were to start the 'Genesis' club, the Sket Dan would be disbanded. Later, Yamanobe taught them 'Hyperion', a part-chess part-DND board game which only male players seem to enjoy. He also introduced a crappy Super Mario game parody.

=== Kaimei High School students ===
Chiaki Takahashi (高橋 千秋, Takahashi Chiaki)

- Voiced by: Satomi Satō

Chiaki Takahashi first appeared in chapter 5 of the manga and episode 3 of the anime. She is usually addressed as "Captain" as she is the captain of Kaimei High School's softball team. She was Himeko's first friend - it was her that made Himeko accept friends again. She had done this by persuading Himeko, everyday, into being her friend. She also befriended Bossun in the process. She lost her mother at a young age. Thus, she grew up with much more responsibility than others, even to the point of wanting to take care of her younger brother while she's busy with school. She is well known for being responsible, proven with the fact that she, other than the softball club's captain, is also class representative. She is also kind and caring but can be a bit clumsy at times. She also has this certain charisma that affects a lot of people around her, making them become much more passionate in what they are currently doing. She has been considered cute and attractive quite a few times. Something else that is notable about her is her love for eating, which she has taken up to the extreme now that she "can eat faster than the speed of sound".

Roman Saotome (早乙女 浪漫, Saotome Roman)

- Voiced by: Ai Kayano

Roman Saotome first appeared in chapter 7 of the manga and episode 4 of the anime. She is in the same grade as Bossun, Himeko, and Switch. She has a crush on Bossun and calls him "Prince", although it isn't much of a developed crush and more of a schoolgirl crush. She has a special ability, the Otome Filter, which makes everything look the way she wants it to. Ranging from seeing a guy more handsome (ex. the guy from the Gachinko Vivage Battle in episode 11) to seeing a purple towel turn into a puppy (ex. Bossun holding a Pellolipop towel in episode 4). Her Otome Filter can also manifest so others can see it as well, causing others to think they're dreaming. She loves Shōjo manga and wants to be a manga artist when she grows up, but she doesn't seem to draw well. She often acts as if she's from a clichéd shojo manga and often narrates her own life.

Reiko Yuuki (結城 澪呼, Yūki Reiko)

- Voiced by: Fumiko Orikasa

Reiko first appears in chapter 3 of the manga and episode 5 of the anime. She has a ghost-like appearance making many people believe she actually is a ghost. She has bags under her eyes and a bent back and usually a dark black aura. She strongly believes in the occult and has a friendly rivalry with Switch who doesn't believe in the occult due to his strong belief in science. Although she is shown to have no interest in fashion, it is proven by Switch that with a makeover, Reiko can look pretty. (Episode 21)

Shinzo Takemitsu (武光 振蔵, Takemitsu Shinzō)

- Voiced by: Kenta Miyake

Shinzo first appears in chapter 4 of the manga and episode 2 of the anime. He is the captain of the kendo club at Kaimei. He relies on his mints to wake himself up and bring himself to full potential before a match and is trying hard not to do that. He claims to want to be a samurai but a running gag through the story is that Shinzo will do things that make him un-samurai-like (ex. playing on his cellphone). He is often shown wearing samurai clothing and having his hair tied up. Since his father is an actor, he is also caught speaking in play-like language.

Moe Yabasawa (矢場沢 萌, Yabasawa Moe)

- Voiced by: Megumi Toyoguchi

Yabasawa is a rather large girl but has great confidence in herself-especially in her looks. She has a "3" shaped mouth - and this mouth shape is the reason the sket team entered into a contest with the student council, for a "3" shaped mouth for her avatar on her phone. She is a member of the school's cheerleading squad and has been noted to have a good singing voice. The word "yabas" (the first part of her name) is used extensively throughout her conversations, she often finishes sentences with it, she uses it as a single word statement to express surprise and substitutes it for other words "that's so totally yabas" / compounds it with other words "yabastactic". She has a perverted pet monkey called Yeti who wears a yellow backpack. The monkey often causes mischief by doing odd stuff to girls.

Saaya Agata (安形 紗綾, Agata Saaya)

- Voiced by: Kana Hanazawa

Saaya first appears in chapter 128 of the manga and in the end of episode 51 of the anime. She is the sister of Student Council former president Sojiro Agata. She is a twin tailed tsundere girl and seems quite snobbish towards males because of this character trait. Chiaki advises her to visit the Sket Dance club room where she ends up befriending all of the members and soon develops a crush on Bossun. She also forces Bossun, Himeko, and Switch to adopt the owl she finds in the Park which they name Hosuke. Initially they find it troublesome to take care of him but soon realise that it's actually very easy and that he is intelligent in his own way. Her brother is extremely protective of her, and gets angry if boys so much as touch her. He misconcludes that Saaya and Tsubaki have a crush on each other and the more Saaya and the others try to clear this, the more complicated the love diagram in his head becomes, which is a running gag after her appearance. In the end, she graduates and is last seen going to college with a little hairstyle change.
