= Sket Dance =

Japanese manga series

- First tankōbon volume cover, featuring Himeko (left), Bossun (center), and Switch (right)
- Genre: Comedy; Slice of life
- Manga
- Written by: Kenta Shinohara
- Published by: Shueisha
- Imprint: Jump Comics
- Magazine: Weekly Shōnen Jump
- Original run: July 14, 2007 – July 8, 2013
- Volumes: 32
- Light novel

Sket Dance: Extra Dance
- Written by: Sawako Hirabayashi
- Illustrated by: Kenta Shinohara
- Published by: Shueisha
- Imprint: Jump J-Books
- Original run: November 4, 2009 – July 2, 2010
- Volumes: 2
- Anime television series
- Directed by: Keiichiro Kawaguchi
- Produced by: Ken Yoda
- Music by: Shuhei Naruse
- Studio: Tatsunoko Production
- Original network: TXN (TV Tokyo)
- English network: SEA: Animax Asia
- Original run: April 7, 2011 – September 27, 2012
- Episodes: 77
- Original video animation

Sket Dance OVA
- Directed by: Keiichiro Kawaguchi
- Studio: Tatsunoko Production
- Released: February 4, 2013
- Runtime: 27 minutes
- icon

Sket Dance (stylized in all caps) is a Japanese manga series written and illustrated by Kenta Shinohara. It was serialized in Shueisha's shōnen manga magazine Weekly Shōnen Jump from July 2007 to July 2013, with its chapters collected in 32 tankōbon volumes. The series follows the adventures of the Sket-dan, a high school club whose goal it is to help the students and teachers of Kaimei High School with their problems, as they do whatever it takes to help make their campus a better place. The story is mainly told in the perspective of the Sket-dan's three members: Bossun, the leader of the group; Himeko, the "muscle" and the only female in the group; and Switch, the otaku and the "brains" of the group.

The manga was adapted into an anime television series produced by Tatsunoko Production, and was broadcast on TV Tokyo from April 2011 to September 2012, airing 77 episodes. In 2009, Sket Dance won the 55th annual Shogakukan Manga Award in the shōnen category.

== Synopsis ==
The series follows the shenanigans and day-to-day activities of the Sket-dan (スケット団, Suketto-dan) ("Sket Brigade" in the Animax broadcast), a high school club dedicated towards helping other people in the campus of Kaimei High School, whether teacher or student, with whatever request they have—completely free of charge.

The club consists of three members: Bossun, leader of the group; Himeko, who wields a hockey stick as her weapon; and Switch, the tech-savvy otaku who only speaks through his laptop with speech synthesis software. Together as the Sket-dan, the trio take on requests from different kinds of individuals around their school the Sket-dan manage to always get the job done—all on a mission to improve the lives of the people in their high school.

== Media ==
=== Manga ===
Written and illustrated by Kenta Shinohara, Sket Dance was first published as a one-shot chapter in the Winter 2006 issue of Shueisha's Akamaru Jump, and another one-shot was published in Shueisha's Weekly Shōnen Jump on August 28, 2006. Sket Dance was later serialized for six years in Weekly Shōnen Jump from July 14, 2007, to July 8, 2013. Its 288 individual chapters were published in thirty-two tankōbon volumes published by Shueisha, released from November 2, 2007, to August 2, 2013.

In June 2018, Shueisha announced a 16-volume bunkoban edition of the series. The first two volumes were released on June 18, 2018. The final bunkoban volume was released on January 18, 2019, and the complete 16-volume box set was released on August 8, 2019. In February 2023, Shinohara drew a crossover between Sket Dance, and his other series, Witch Watch.

=== Anime ===
In October 2010, an anime television series adaptation of Sket Dance was announced. Animated by Tatsunoko Production and directed by Keiichiro Kawaguchi, the series was broadcast for 77 episodes on TV Tokyo from April 7, 2011, to September 27, 2012. The episodes were collected in 26 DVD sets; 17 volumes were released from August 26, 2011, to December 28, 2012, and nine volumes, under the title Sket Dance: Second Dance, were released from January 30 to May 24, 2013.

The series has been published in numerous DVD volumes. The first DVD compilation of Sket Dance was released on August 28, 2011, and the 26th and last on May 24, 2013.

An original video animation (OVA) was released on February 4, 2013, bundled with the 29th volume of the manga.

In September 2021, in commemoration of the anime's 10th anniversary, it was announced that a Blu-ray box set, titled "Sket Dance Memorial Complete Blu-ray", would be released on December 24 of that same year. It included the 2013 OVA.

On October 15, 2021, the first 25 episodes became available for streaming in Japan on Amazon Prime Video. Episodes 26 to 51 were made available on November 15, and episodes 52 to 77 were made available on December 15.

=== Drama CDs ===
A drama CD adaptation was released on October 30, 2009. A second drama CD was released on April 28, 2010.

=== Light novels ===
- Sket Dance Extra Dance 1: Shinsetsu! Gakuen Nanafushigi (SKET DANCE extra dance 1 真説! 学園七不思議; 'Sket Dance Extra Dance 1: The True Story! The Seven Mysteries of the School') (published by Shueisha on November 4, 2009)
- Sket Dance Extra Dance 2: Seitokai no Jikenbo – Cook-Shell Jiken (SKET DANCE extra dance 2 生徒会の事件簿〜クック・シェル事件〜; 'Sket Dance Extra Dance 2: The Student Council Case Files – The Cook-Shell Incident') (published by Shueisha on July 2, 2010)

=== Video games ===
Bossun, Himeko, and Switch appear together as a single support character in the Jump crossover fighting game J-Stars Victory VS.

== Reception ==
From volume 6 onward, Sket Dance has consistently debuted on the weekly best sellers list for manga in Japan. Volume 6 debuted at number 9. Volumes 7, 9, and 10 debuted at number 11. Volume 8 debuted at number 13 while volume 11 debuted at number 12.

In January 2010, Sket Dance was announced as the winner of the 55th annual Shogakukan Manga Award for best shōnen manga.

In September 2009, Japanese publisher Shueisha issued an apology in the 42nd weekly issue of Weekly Shōnen Jump over a depiction of main characters, Bossun and Himeko, inhaling helium to raise the pitch of their voices. The scene drew criticism from online forums and blogs over the danger of suffocation from breathing helium.
