= List of Highschool of the Dead characters =

The main cast of Highschool of the Dead (front to rear): Takashi Komuro (Front), Saeko Busujima (Middle left), Kohta Hirano (Middle right), Rei Miyamoto (Rear left), Saya Takagi (Rear), and Shizuka Marikawa (Rear right).

The manga and anime series Highschool of the Dead features a diverse range of characters designed by Shōji Satō with their storyline written by Daisuke Satō. The series revolves around a pandemic that turns humans into zombies, euphemistically referred to by the main characters as "Them" (奴ら, Yatsu-ra), and the story follows a group of students at Fujimi High School: Takashi Komuro, Rei Miyamoto, Saeko Busujima, Saya Takagi, and Kohta Hirano. Shizuka Marikawa, the high school's nurse, and Alice Maresato, a young girl, join the students as they fight their way to safety through the deadly streets of Japan during a worldwide catastrophic event known as the "Outbreak".

== Creation and conception ==
Daisuke Sato, who has previously worked on various military genre games and manga, which include Imperial Guards, wrote the story which uses the perspective of Japanese high school students and refers to classic zombie apocalypse movies such as Dawn of the Dead. Character design was done by manga artist Shōji Satō whose previous work was mostly self-published titles in the adult genre, and this was his first major non-hentai title.

Masayoshi Tanaka, who also did Ano Hana, Toradora and later Waiting in the Summer, served as the Chief Animation Director and Character Designer for the anime adaptation. Series Director Tetsurō Araki, who previously directed Death Note and Black Lagoon, mentioned in a 2010 Dragon Age interview, that he wanted to fill in the anime with many jiggling breast scenes, and that he was aiming for something he would have bought himself in middle school. Zac Bertschy of Anime News Network agrees with the intent: "turns out this show has decided that the one thing the zombie genre was missing were anime boobs." The anime also had a character break the fourth wall: when asked why she is so ditzy, she responds that she was designed that way. Director Steven Foster, in his English dub adaptation, changed Takashi Komuro's character to use more profanity, as well as adding modern references to people such as Sarah Palin.

== Main characters ==
=== Takashi Komuro ===
Voiced by: Junichi Suwabe, Hitomi Harada (child) (Japanese); Leraldo Anzaldua (English)

Takashi Komuro (小室 孝, Komuro Takashi) is a 17-year-old second-year student of Fujimi High School and the male protagonist and viewpoint character of the series. He and Rei are childhood friends and also in the same class. When they were children, Rei and Takashi made a promise to get married someday, but because of his indecisiveness, Rei started dating his friend, Hisashi. At the beginning of the series, when he notices the zombies attack the teachers at the front gate he rushes to Rei's side. When Hisashi turns into a zombie, Takashi kills Hisashi with a blow to the head, causing Rei to accuse Takashi of jealousy. Takashi proceeds to leave, admitting to her accusation in his thoughts, but Rei holds him back and apologizes; he responds with a hug.^{[ch. 1]}

Although he is not a model student and had to repeat a grade, Takashi shows his resolve to protect his friends and is appointed the leader of the group by his peers.^{[ch. 1,12]} After fighting their way out of school with a baseball bat, Takashi recovers a Smith & Wesson Model 37 pistol from a dead cop, and later uses an Ithaca M37 riot shotgun.^{[ch. 1,4,6,9]} When the group visits a police station, he upgrades to a Benelli M4 Super 90 combat shotgun.^{[ch. 27]} Although he does not officially have a license, Takashi rides a motorcycle and also drives an Argo ATV.^{[ch. 3,14,16]}

=== Rei Miyamoto ===
Voiced by: Marina Inoue (Japanese); Jessica Boone (English)

Rei Miyamoto (宮本 麗, Miyamoto Rei) is Takashi Komuro's classmate with orange-brown hair and reddish brown eyes. Before the events of the series, As of the school's sōjutsu club. Rei made a pinky promise to marry Takashi, but because of his indecisiveness, Rei started dating Hisashi. Rei is upset that Takashi kills Hisashi after he becomes a zombie, but when Takashi proceeds to leave her, she quickly retracts her words and pulls him back.^{[ch. 1]} In chapter 12, Rei tells Takashi that girls like guys that are cute and caring. When Takashi replies that he is not either of those she says that's why she likes him and does not want him to be with any other girls.^{[ch. 12]} Rei despises Mr. Shido, mainly because Shido held her back a year at school and caused trouble for her father.^{[ch. 2,14]}

At the start of the series, Rei fights with a sharpened broomstick.^{[ch. 1]} After visiting Rika's apartment, she upgrades to a Springfield M1A1 Super Match rifle with a bayonet attached.^{[ch. 8]}

Character designer Shōji Satō featured Rei and Saeko in cross-over illustrations for his other manga Triage X and the video game Lollipop Chainsaw, where their high school uniforms are available as downloadable content costumes for main character Juliet Starling.

=== Saeko Busujima ===
Voiced by: Miyuki Sawashiro (Japanese); Taylor Hannah (English)

Saeko Busujima (毒島 冴子, Busujima Saeko) is a third-year student at Fujimi High School with dark violet hair and bright blue eyes. As the president of the school's kendo club Saeko carries a bokken (wooden sword). Saeko is introduced as a calm and collected girl with pride in her skills; she kills an infected student out of mercy.^{[ch. 2]} Her father is abroad somewhere for a martial arts tournament.^{[ch. 5]}

Saeko confides in Takashi that she was once almost sexually assaulted, but was able to fight back with her bokken and ended up breaking several of the attacker's bones before the police came. Although Takashi says it was self-defense, Saeko counters saying that it is her "raw nature" to take pleasure in inflicting pain and, in that way, she is no different than one of the zombies. She struggles with this part of her character and even considers giving up to "them", until Takashi helps restore her confidence.

Saeko initially uses her bokken to fight, but upgrades to a katana when they stop at a shinto temple and then again at the Takagi estate.^{[ch. 12]} After the group visit a police station, Saeko starts carrying a Beretta 92 Vertec handgun on her thigh as a secondary weapon.^{[ch. 27]}

Saeko was featured along with Rei in some cross-over illustrations for Triage X and Lollipop Chainsaw, the latter of which features her purple high school uniform as a downloadable content costume.

=== Saya Takagi ===
Voiced by: Eri Kitamura (Japanese); Maggie Flecknoe (English)

Saya Takagi (高城 沙耶, Takagi Saya) is a second-year student at Fujimi High School with pink hair styled in twin tails. She is the daughter of an influential uyoku dantai (right-wing) politician. A self-proclaimed genius, Saya uses her knowledge and deductive capabilities to help the group escape from harm, being among the first to conclude that "they" were attracted to only sound. Saya confronts her other self and joins the group. Despite coming from a prestigious family, she despised her parents, who she thought had given up on finding her, but reconciles with them during the raid on the family estate.

She detests that her family servants and related people only call her by her last name and never look her in the eyes when speaking to her. The exceptions to this are Kohta, whom she has a strange friendship with, and Takashi, who is her childhood friend. Saya watches over Alice like a guardian and insists Alice say her name using the "-sama" honorific. She scolds anyone who would attempt to tarnish Alice's innocence to any degree.^{[ch. 10,18]}

She uses an electric drill in early chapters of the series, then acquires a Luger P08 pistol. In Chapter 28, Kohta gives her an MP5 in exchange for her Luger.^{[ch. 28]}

=== Kohta Hirano ===
Voiced by: Nobuyuki Hiyama (Japanese); Mark X. Laskowski (English)

Kohta Hirano (平野 コータ, Hirano Kōta) is a 16-year-old second-year student at Fujimi High School who appears to be just a wimpy overweight guy with glasses, but is actually a gun enthusiast.^{[ch. 2,11]} He credits this to a visit to America, where he trained with a former Delta Force member for a month.^{[ch. 6]} (Note: In the English dub, Kohta's trainer is a Blackwater consultant.) In the beginning of the story, Saya finds Kohta cringing in the hallway as students run about in a panic.^{[ch. 1]} They hide in a classroom where Hirano is able to put together a nail gun rifle powered by gas cartridges.^{[vol. 5:extra,ch2]} Kohta has an unrequited crush on Saya.^{[ch. 2]} Kohta provides long-range cover when Takashi rescues Alice Maresato from approaching zombies after Alice's father is killed.^{[ch. 7]} At Saya's mansion, Kohta is confronted by some of Takagi's followers who demand that he surrender his weapons, but Kohta refuses saying this is the one thing he was good at and that he wants to protect Saya. The rest of the group, including Saya, support him.^{[ch. 11]}

At the shopping mall, Kohta develops feelings for the police officer trainee, Asami Nakaoka, after helping her subdue an angry mall survivor. He spends some quality time with her, and convinces her to join the group. Unfortunately, the friendship is short-lived when Asami becomes trapped while attempting to save a boy in the parking lot. She shouts for Kohta to make it so that she will not become a zombie and cause pain to others around her. Kohta kills her and later finds himself in shock, but he is set straight by Shizuka, who uses a psychology trick of ordering him around like a sergeant.^{[ch. 19-26]}

Kohta uses a variety of firearms; he favors the AR-10 (illegally modified to resemble an SR-25), which he uses to take out targets from a distance.^{[ch. 7]} During the raid on the police station, Kohta finds a Suppressed MP5 SFK, but gives it to Saya in exchange for her mom's Luger P08 pistol.^{[ch. 27,28]}

He is based on Kouta Hirano, creator of the Hellsing manga. Hirano himself is aware of the related character, writing in one afterword of Hellsing that "Now if you’ll excuse me, I have to go kill zombies at my high school."

=== Shizuka Marikawa ===
Voiced by: Yukari Fukui (Japanese); Monica Rial (English)

Shizuka Marikawa (鞠川 静香, Marikawa Shizuka) is a nurse at Fujimi High School. At the beginning of the story, Marikawa is nearly killed by a student-turned-zombie but is saved by Saeko Busujima. She has a rather ditsy personality, and her large boobs and butt size is often used as a comical element in the story.^{[ch. 6,26,29]} She is close friends with Rika Minami, who works as a sniper on the prefectural police Special Assault Team, and she even house-sits for her. The group uses Rika's apartment to rest after they escape the high school.^{[ch. 5]} Although she is the oldest of the group at age 27, she is emotionally fragile and does not know what will become of her life. She reveals to Takashi Komuro that she is just a temporary school nurse, and that she is still taking classes and training.^{[ch. 11]} Despite this, Marikawa has put her knowledge to good use, and even brings Kohta Hirano to his senses after he had mercy-killed Asami Nakaoka.^{[ch. 28]} As the only adult in the group, she drives the bus out of the school, and then Rika's military-grade Humvee.^{[ch. 2,6]}

=== Alice Maresato ===
Voiced by: Ayana Taketatsu (Japanese); Brittney Karbowski (English)

Arisu Maresato (希里 アリス, Maresato Arisu; "Arisu Maresato" in the anime) is a seven-year-old girl whom Kohta and Takashi rescue from the zombie horde after her father-(a newspaper reporter) is killed by members of a household who would not allow them shelter.^{[ch. 7]} She has a generally positive attitude, as Takashi and Saeko comment how she has "done well" in coping with the loss.^{[ch. 10]} In some of the chapters, she and Zeke scout the area for the group. In the English dub of the anime, she goes by the name Arisu. According to a bonus chapter, she is the next door neighbor of Takashi's friend, Imamuru.^{[vol. 5:03extra]}

== Other characters ==
=== Hisashi Igo ===
Voiced by: Mamoru Miyano (Japanese); David Matranga (English)

Hisashi Igo (井豪 永, Igō Hisashi) is a second year Fujimi High School student and Rei Miyamoto's classmate and boyfriend; he and Takashi are friends. He refers to the zombies as "them" since they are not quite like the ones seen in movies, and that becomes the name for any zombies the main group encounters in the series. On the way out of class, he is bitten by an infected teacher. After rising as one of "them", Takashi delivers a fatal blow to his head.^{[ch. 1]}

=== Koichi Shido ===
Voiced by: Kisho Taniyama (Japanese); Illich Guardiola (English)

Koichi Shido (紫藤 浩一, Shidō Kōichi) is the teacher of Class 3A. Rei Miyamoto is disgusted by him and Saeko Busujima says his name with a scowl, which hints of his villainous character, which is affirmed when he leaves behind a student who sprained his ankle and even kicks him back towards a group of pursuing zombies, and says there is no point in keeping weaklings alive.^{[ch. 2]} Kohta Hirano affirms that Shido used to allow bullies to beat Kohta up as he watched with glee.^{[ch. 5]}

Saya and Saeko comment that Shido's actions are like that of a recruiter for a religious cult. Shido permits the main group to leave the bus except for Shizuka, but Kohta expresses his disapproval of Shido's actions and grazes Shido's face with a nail gun shot.^{[ch. 5]} Later on, Shido watches over an orgy among his followers. He finds this behavior acceptable during the group's "free time". Shido declares his followers "angels that will help usher in a new age", but when Yamada disagrees and shows concern for his own family, Shido convinces his followers to eject the "weak link" for the sake of the New World, and they callously throw the teen off the bus and leave him to be eaten by "them".^{[ch. 11,12]}

Koichi Shido is the son of Ichiro Shido, a politician. In the manga, when Koichi's mother dies, he becomes a teacher at Tokonosu where his father is a director, but his father reveals he has an illegitimate son, and forces him to work in the shady family business. One of the dealings involves stopping Rei’s father from investigating the Shido family’s funding; Shido arranges for Rei to be held back a year. When Rei threatens to kill Shido with her bayonet, Shido dares her to do it, but she cannot, as he is not worth the trouble. Soichiro orders Shido and his student followers to leave, and he complies, but a high-altitude nuclear explosion causes both the bus and nearby forklift with a concrete barrier to stall and they collide. He recovers consciousness in time to see the undead horde that advances through the gap in the barrier.^{[ch. 14]}

Shido reappears at the entrance to Shintoko Third Elementary School, which is a gathering point for some of the survivors.^{[ch. 28]}

=== Rika Minami ===
Voiced by: Junko Takeuchi (Japanese); Melissa Davis (English)

Rika Minami (南 リカ, Minami Rika) is the chief of first squadron in the prefecture police, and an expert sniper in the Special Assault Team, who, along with the Special Security Team, are deployed to clear the nearby airport of any zombie stragglers and to rescue any survivors. She is friends with Shizuka Marikawa, and lets her house-sit when she goes on assignments. At the airport mission, her partner sacrifices himself by using jet fuel in a tanker to immolate the zombies. She manages to get in contact with Shizuka, who informs her that they "stayed over and borrowed her weapons and things," before the communication is cut by an EMP surge.^{[ch. 5,13]} She is last seen as she returns to the city to find Marikawa.^{[ch. 28]}

=== Zeke ===
Voiced by: Hitomi Harada (Japanese); Michelle Griffiths (English)

Zeke (ジーク, Jīku), known in the English anime dub as Zero, is a mixed-breed puppy that joins the group when Takashi rescues Alice. He is named after the Mitsubishi A6M Zero fighter plane, which was also nicknamed Zeke by the Allied forces during World War II.^{[ch. 7,8]}

=== Soichiro Takagi ===
Voiced by: Jouji Nakata (Japanese); Andrew Love (English)

Soichiro Takagi (高城 壮一郎, Takagi Sōichirō) is Saya's father. He is the leader of a right-wing nationalist group in the Tokonosu district. He showed his leadership to the survivors when he rallies them to kill the zombies in order to save Japanese society from collapsing, and publicly kills his zombified subordinate.^{[ch. 10,11]}

Soichiro seems to be a sword expert: he prefers to use the sword instead of his wife's Luger P08 pistol and has trained with Saeko Busujima's father. Later he entrusts Saeko with a katana made with military-grade steel at an industrial weapons factory. When the zombies breach the estate, he and his troops fight them off. He tells Takashi Komuro to go save Rei's parents, and entrusts Kouta Hirano with protecting Saya. While the Takagis and the rest of the estate survivors fight against the horde, Soichiro comments that they are proud of their daughter and the friends she has made.^{[ch. 12-15]}

=== Yuriko Takagi ===
Voiced by: Yoshiko Sakakibara (Japanese); Shelley Calene-Black (English)

Yuriko Takagi (高城 百合子, Takagi Yuriko) is Saya's mother. She worked in New York City as a Wall Street stock broker until she met and married Soichiro Takagi. The Takagi family fortune rose significantly due to her business connections. When the zombies breach the estate, she gives Saya her Luger P08 pistol, and then proceeds to assist her husband in fighting the horde.^{[ch. 12-15]}

=== Miku Yuuki ===
Voiced by: Airi Sakuno (Japanese); Emily Neves (English)

Miku Yuuki (夕樹 美玖, Yūki Miku) is a second-year Fujimi High student, who schoolmate Morita says is one of the sexiest girls in school.^{[vol. 5:03extra]} She sides with Koichi Shido when he takes over the bus, and participates in their debauchery. When Yamada questions Shido, Yuuki suggests they kick him off the bus.^{[ch. 11,12]} She also helps Shido enter the Takagi estate by flirting with one of the guards, but is forced to leave after Shido is expelled from the estate.^{[ch. 14]} She later appears alongside Shido at the entrance to Shintoko Third Elementary School.^{[ch. 28]}

=== Asami Nakaoka ===
Asami Nakaoka (中岡 あさみ, Nakaoka Asami) is a young traffic enforcer for Tokonosu Higashi Police Station; she guards a group of survivors at a nearby mall. She refers to herself in the third-person. Asami's authority quickly wanes amongst the survivors until Kohta Hirano and Takashi Komuro arrive and build up her confidence by giving her a Smith & Wesson Model 37 pistol (the standard-issue firearm for Japanese police officers). She develops a liking for Kohta after he subdues a guy named Shimada who wanted to sexually assault Shizuka Marikawa. Asami later accompanies Takashi to help obtain blood plasma for a sick survivor and is forced to mercy kill one of the mall survivors, Tamaru, when he gets bitten by "them". Asami's superior officer is Matsushima, who leaves for the police station before Takashi and the group arrive. Asami is shocked to find Matsushima who is walking as a zombie. She dejectedly runs to the mall's rooftop but is encouraged by Kohta to go with him and his friends.^{[ch. 18-23]}

When the zombies invade the mall, Asami uses some firecrackers to divert their attention. Shortly after breaking out of the mall with the group, she attempts to save a frightened student trapped on top of a truck in the parking lot. She and Shimada distract the zombies long enough for the student to escape, however Asami herself becomes trapped without any more bullets. Asami shouts that she hates Kohta, although Takashi immediately recognizes and tells Kohta that she is just yelling to attract the zombies so that they can escape. She shouts out one final request for Kohta not to allow her to become a zombie, and Kohta sadly aims his rifle at her head as she salutes goodbye.^{[ch. 25]}

=== Tadashi Miyamoto ===
Voiced by: Jin Urayama (Japanese); Steven Knight (English)

Tadashi Miyamoto (宮本 正, Miyamoto Tadashi) is Rei's father and a police officer who first appears in chapter 30. Previously, only his voice was heard on Rei's cellphone in a bad one-way connection. ^{[ch. 2]} Prior to the outbreak, Miyamoto has been investigating fraud and corruption relating to Koichi Shido's family. When he learned that his daughter Rei was held back a year because of his actions he apologized to Rei but continued his investigation with the goal of arresting the Shidos.^{[ch. 14]} Tadashi leaves a message on the whiteboard at the police station for all surviving police to head towards Shintoko Third Elementary School for a scheduled evacuation by the SDF.^{[ch. 28]}

=== Kiriko Miyamoto ===
Kiriko Miyamoto (宮本 貴理子, Miyamoto Kiriko) is Rei's mother and one of the neighborhood survivors. When she goes out for supplies the neighbors shut her out. Happily, she meets Rei and the group and they head to Shintoko Third Elementary School to join the other survivors. Kiriko has worked as a police officer and was nicknamed Precinct Kiriko for her ferocity. She uses her husband's spear with some apparent expertise.^{[ch. 29]}

== Reception ==
Deb Aoki found the manga characters to be interesting with distinct personalities and conflicts, but the fanservice to be utterly ridiculous and distracting. Chris Zimmerman of Comicbookbin.com criticizes the "one-note characters that have undergone little development" in the manga.

Nicole MacLean of T.H.E.M. Anime Reviews found the characters utterly dull and vapid; she wrote that there was "no hope for characters who must be stripped naked to become remotely interesting." Theron Martin of Anime News Network found the character dynamics interesting to watch especially between Kohta Hirano and Saya Takagi, and the "solid give-and-take relationship" between Takashi Komuro and Rei Miyamoto, although Shizuka Marikawa as a busty airhead was disappointing. Marcus Speer of Japanator.com listed Saeko Busujima as an honorable mention in his yearly list for best female characters, and praised her delivery of the phrase "I'm wet!" (濡れるッ!, Nureru!).^{[ch. 17]}

Zac Bertschy of Anime News Network wrote that the English dub voices were all just fine except for Monica Rial's "nigh-unlistenable high-pitched bimbo voice", and also wrote that Takashi changed from a "soft-spoken, straightforward fellow to a kid who just found out he can drop F-bombs without mom getting angry". Bertschy also criticizes the character design of the girls in the show as "ridiculously-endowed heroines" with "cartoon bombshell bodies" that are "tiresome and feels like it was written by a 13-year old."

== Merchandise ==
The characters of Highschool of the Dead are featured on various merchandise from wall-scroll posters and figurines (some of which have removable clothing) to keychains, wallets, cell phone charms, and T-shirts.
