= Daisuke Sato =

Daisuke Sato may refer to:

- Daisuke Satō (1964–2017), Japanese board game designer, novelist, and manga writer
- Daisuke Sato (footballer) (born 1994), Filipino footballer
