= Fuyuka Ono =

Japanese voice actress

- 大浦 冬華
- Born: 13 January 1978 (age 48); Sapporo, Hokkaido, Japan
- Other name: Fuyuka Oura
- Occupation: Voice actress
- Years active: 2000–present
- Agent: Green Note
- Notable work: Twin Spica as Kei Oumi; Mega Man Star Force as Geo Stelar/Subaru Hoshikawa; Major as Toshiya; Princess Resurrection as Hiro Hiyorimi Battle Spirits Brave as Dan Bashin; Triage X as Yuuko Sagiri

Fuyuka Oura (Japanese: 大浦 冬華, Hepburn: Ōura Fuyuka; born 13 January 1978), professionally known as Fuyuka Ono (緒乃 冬華, Ono Fuyuka) since 2016, is a Japanese voice actress affiliated with Green Note. She is known for starring as Kei Oumi in Twin Spica, Geo Stelar/Subaru Hoshikawa in Mega Man Star Force, Toshiya in Major, Hiro Hiyorimi in Princess Resurrection, Dan Bashin in Battle Spirits Brave, and Yuuko Sagiri in Triage X, and also for voicing Ren Elsie Jewelria in To Love Ru and Eve in Fairy Tail.

== Biography ==
Fuyuka Oura, a native of Sapporo, was born on 13 January 1978. After she voiced Tomoka Osakada in The Prince of Tennis, she starred as Kei Oumi in Twin Spica, Geo Stelar/Subaru Hoshikawa in Mega Man Star Force, Toshiya in Major, and Hiro Hiyorimi in Princess Resurrection.

Ono appeared as Ren Elsie Jewelria in To Love Ru, reprising her role in the 2015 video game To Love-Ru Darkness: True Princess. She reprised her role as Toshiya in the 2009 film Major: Yūjō no Winning Shot. In 2010, she starred as Dan Bashin in Battle Spirits: Brave, and she joined the Fairy Tail cast as the voice of Eve for their Nirvana arc. In 2015, she starred in Triage X as Yuuko Sagiri. In 2016, she changed her stage name from Fuyuka Oura, her real name, to Fuyuka Ono.

In video games, she has also voiced Sayaka Myoujin in Trauma Center: Second Opinion, Chisato Madison in Star Ocean: The Second Story, and Gangut in Azur Lane.

Ono married on 7 July 2011. Her first child, a daughter, was born on 6 August 2013.

== Filmography ==
=== Television animation ===
Year	Title	Role	Ref.
2001	The Prince of Tennis	Tomoka Osakada	
2003	Twin Spica	Kei Omi	
2004	Aishiteruze Baby	Mai Motoki	
2004	Gakuen Alice	Chairperson	
2004	Major	Young Toshiya Sato	
2005	Animal Yokochō	Takeru, Kotaro	
2006	Hell Girl	Hotaru Meshiai, Kaori Nakiri	
2006	Mamoru-kun ni Megami no Shukufuku o!	Yoko Kirishima	
2006	Mega Man Star Force	Subaru Hoshikawa/Rockman	
2006	Twin Princess of Wonder Planet Gyu!	Color	
2006	Wan Wan Celeb Soreyuke! Tetsunoshin	Hana, Sajit	
2007	Higurashi When They Cry	Miyoko Tanashi	
2007	Nodame Cantabile	Mika	
2007	Princess Resurrection	Hiro Hiyorimi	
2007	Shizuku-chan	Ameri-chan	
2008	Corpse Princess	Mizuki Inuhiko	
2008	Natsume's Book of Friends	Young Shūichi Natori	
2008	Psychic Squad	Akira Yadorigi	
2008	Someday's Dreamers	Michiru Satō	
2008	To Love Ru	Run & Ren Elsie Jewelria	
2008	Yumemiru Anime On-chan	OK-chan's mother, assistant	
2009	Basquash!	Thousand	
2009	Battle Spirits: Shounen Gekiha-dan	Dan Bashin	
2009	Chrome Shelled Regios	Naruki Gelni	
2009	Kaidan Restaurant	Bunta Ōzora	
2009	Pandora Hearts	Young Vincent	
2009	Sweet Blue Flowers	Chizu Hanashiro	
2009	Umineko When They Cry	Lambdadelta	
2010	Battle Spirits: Brave	Dan Bashin	
2010–2019	Fairy Tail	Yukino Agria, Sorano, Eve Tearm	
2010	House of Five Leaves	Otake	
2010	The Legend of the Legendary Heroes	Kiefer Knolles	
2011	A Dark Rabbit Has Seven Lives	Hinata Kurenai	
2011	Anohana	Irène Honma	
2011	Digimon Fusion	Musashi Kenzaki	
2011	Happy Kappy	Natsume Kinoshita	
2012	AKB0048	Tomochin-nee	
2012	Cardfight!! Vanguard	Karasu Endō	
2012	Hiiro no Kakera	Misuzu Kasuga	
2012	Shining Hearts: Shiawase no Pan	Flora	
2012	Upotte!!	Isukee-sensei	
2012	Victory Kickoff!!	Katsura Uchimura	
2012	Waiting in the Summer	Manami Okura	
2013	Beyblade: Shogun Steel	Baifū	
2013	Nagi-Asu: A Lull in the Sea	Chisaki's mother	
2013	Silver Spoon	Aki's mother	
2014	Tokyo ESP	Reia Ōzora	
2014	Tokyo Ghoul	Kaya Irimi	
2015	Triage X	Yuuko Sagiri	
2015	The Rolling Girls	Kuniko Shigyō	
2016	Nanbaka	Houzuki Sanzou, Noriko Sanzou	
2018	Bakumatsu		
2020	Battle Spirits: Kakumei no Galette	Als Glynnhorn	
2021	Battle Spirits: Mirage	Als Glynnhorn	
2023	Ayakashi Triangle	Run	

=== Original net animation ===
Year	Title	Role	Ref.
2014	Fastening Days 4	Yōji	

=== Original video animation ===
Year	Title	Role	Ref.
2007	Fist of the North Star: The Legends of the True Savior	Young Yuria	
2010	A Certain Scientific Railgun	Asako Jōnan	

=== Animated film ===
Year	Title	Role	Ref.
2008	Major: Yūjō no Winning Shot	Toshiya	
2009	Space Battleship Yamato: Resurrection	Miharu Sasaki	
2010	Wonderful World		
2011	Little Ghostly Adventures of the Tofu Boy	Kappa	
2011	Tansu Warashi	Masa	

=== Video games ===
Year	Title	Role	Ref.
2006	Suikoden V	Ren, Eresh, Arenia	
2006	Trauma Center: Second Opinion	Sayaka Myoujin	
2007	Mega Man Star Force 2	Subaru Hoshikawa/Rockman	
2008	Mega Man Star Force 3	Subaru Hoshikawa/Rockman	
2008	Star Ocean: The Second Story	Chisato Madison	
2009	Rockman EXE Operate Shooting Star	Shooting Star Rockman	
2012	Soulcalibur V	Natsu	
2015	To Love-Ru Darkness: True Princess	Ren Elsie Jewelria	
2020	Azur Lane	Gangut	
