= Mega Man Star Force (TV series) =

Television series

- Cover art of the DVD box set released in the UK

流星のロックマン (Ryūsei no Rokkuman)
- Genre: Action adventure, science fiction, superhero, magical boy, tech noir
- Anime television series
- Directed by: Takao Kato
- Written by: Kenichi Araki
- Music by: Shuhei Naruse (Japan); Thorsten Laewe (U.S.)
- Studio: Xebec
- Licensed by: NA: Viz Media; UK: Manga Entertainment
- Original network: TV Tokyo
- English network: US: Toonami Jetstream Cartoon Network Neon Alley
- Original run: 7 October 2006 – 27 October 2007
- Episodes: 55
- Anime television series

Mega Man Star Force Tribe
- Directed by: Takao Kato
- Written by: Ken'ichi Araki
- Music by: Shuhei Naruse
- Studio: Xebec
- Original network: TV Tokyo
- Original run: 3 November 2007 – 29 March 2008
- Episodes: 21
- Manga

Shooting Star Rockman
- Written by: Masaya Itagaki
- Published by: CoroCoro Comic
- Magazine: CoroCoro Comic
- Original run: November 2006 – January 2008
- Volumes: 3
- Manga

Tribe: Shooting Star Rockman Gaiden
- Written by: Masaya Itagaki
- Published by: CoroCoro Comic
- Magazine: CoroCoro Comic
- Original run: February 2008 – July 2008
- Volumes: 1
- Manga

Farce On Air!! Shooting Star Rockman
- Written by: Kawano Takumi
- Published by: CoroCoro Comic
- Magazine: CoroCoro Comic
- Original run: December 2006 – December 2008
- Volumes: 1
- Manga

Shooting Star Rockman 3
- Written by: Ryo Takamisaki
- Published by: Shogakukan
- Magazine: CoroCoro Comic
- Original run: December 2008 – January 2009 (on hiatus)

Mega Man Star Force, known as Ryūsei no Rockman (流星のロックマン, Ryūsei no Rokkuman; Shooting Star Rockman) in Japan, is an anime and manga series based on the video game of the same name. The series follows the adventures of Geo Stelar and Omega-Xis, a duo capable of em wave change to become the hero "Mega Man". Together, they combat various EM wave beings that threaten to conquer or destroy the Earth.

The manga was serialized in CoroCoro Comic beginning in September 2006, three months before the game's Japanese release. The anime series premiered in Japan on October 7, 2006, shortly after the conclusion of MegaMan NT Warrior. The anime concluded on March 29, 2008, with a total of 76 episodes. The anime was licensed and adapted into English by Viz Media. The English version first premiered online on the streaming service Toonami Jetstream on July 23, 2007, before making its television debut on Cartoon Network on August 25, 2007.

== History ==
Airing October 7, 2006, on TV Tokyo, the Ryūsei no Rockman anime filled the timeslot that had been held by Rockman EXE Beast+, the series' predecessor. Each of its episodes are approximately ten minutes in length as the program shared the thirty-minute segment Oha Coliseum with the Saru Getchu anime series.

On April 17, 2007, VIZ Media announced that they acquired the rights to the anime series, which would be released under the title Mega Man Star Force, as with the namesake video game. The press release mentioned that 13 episodes were to be released at lengths of 20 minutes each (each containing content from approximately two of the quarter-hour length Japanese episodes). During the E3 2007 video-game convention, IGN revealed in their hands-on impressions of the Star Force video game that the English version would premiere on Toonami Jetstream on July 23, 2007. The show made its television debut on Cartoon Network on August 25, 2007, edited as a two-hour presentation composed of scenes from the first nine Japanese episodes. Voice recording for the series was handed by Studiopolis.

According to the September 2007 issue of CoroCoro Comic, the anime would conclude in Japan on October 27, 2007, and be succeeded by a sequel series, titled Ryūsei no Rockman Tribe, premiering on November 3, 2007. The second anime is loosely based on the events of the second game in the series. According to an interview with Fuyuka Oura (Geo's voice actor in the Japanese version) at the 2007 Tokyo Game Show, Tribe has a deeper and "cooler" storyline than before, and the new character Solo is a prominent character in the plot.

Manga Entertainment released all thirteen episodes of the English version in a Region 2 box set in the UK on November 3, 2008. The English dub series was later added to Viz Media's Neon Alley series on June 1, 2015.

On December 17, 2025, Capcom started uploading episodes of the series in both languages on their YouTube channels to promote the release of Mega Man Star Force Legacy Collection (2026). The cast of the anime reprised their respective roles for the game.

=== Production ===
Mega Man Star Force's Electromagnetic Wave Change sequences take after the Cross Fusion sequences of its predecessor. Depicted here is Geo at the beginning of his transformation.

Mega Man Star Force's animation is overseen by XEBEC, with musical arrangements by Naoki Maeda. Character designs (which have in some cases deviated from Capcom's original concepts) are handled by Mitsuru Ishihara and Shingo Adachi (who is also one of the series' art directors, some of the others being Masayuki Nomoto, Akira Takahashi, and Yasuo Shimizu). The art directors usually work independently of each other on any given episode. Shogakukan manages computer-generated imagery.

The original Japanese openings are "Heart Wave" (ハートウェーブ, Hāto Uebu) for the first series, and "Bond Wave" (絆 ウェーブ, Kizuna Uebu) for Tribe, both sung by Misora Hibiki / Sonia Sky.

== Plot ==
The year is 220X. Technology has advanced rapidly since the age of the internet, leading to the creation of new and more efficient modes of transportation, as well as the construction of futuristic cities, all linked together by three satellites orbiting the Earth—Pegasus, Leo, and Dragon. The satellites accomplish this by maintaining a network of EM waves around the planet's atmosphere, thereby powering the invisible EM Wave World. The human population carries portable devices called Transers to interface with the EM Wave World and other electronic devices. Problems caused by criminals and EM Wave Viruses manipulating the EM Wave World are commonly dealt with by the Satella Police.

=== Original series ===

A proud warrior of the FM Planet, Omega-Xis, betrays his kind and escapes to Earth where he makes contact with Geo Stelar. Like his fellow extraterrestrials called FM-ians, Omega-Xis is capable of initiating a process known as "Electromagnetic Wave Change," which transforms ordinary humans of the same frequency as themselves into "EM Wave Humans," allowing them to freely operate in the EM Wave World. With these new powers, Geo becomes known as Mega Man, a hero of Echo Ridge. However, Omega-Xis holds the key to accessing the weapon Andromeda, capable of destroying planets. As such, many FM-ians pursue Omega-Xis with the intent of retrieving the key in their goal to destroy the Earth. Meanwhile, Omega-Xis also knows the secret to the disappearance of Geo's father in a catastrophic space accident months ago.

The first half of the series focuses on the FM-ians hunting Omega-Xis for the Andromeda Key. Eventually, they succeed, but by using Star Force, Mega Man is able to sustain Andromeda and destroy the key. In the latter half of the series, the FM-ians band together, taking the guise of their original human counterparts, and seek a way to energize a new Andromeda Key. Eventually, Gemini Spark takes the reins of the operation and succeeds in reviving Andromeda, but the FM-ian king Cepheus descends onto Earth to put a stop to all of the chaos. Geo also has an encounter with his father Kelvin who reveals that he has become an EM wave being and is still exploring space, and that Geo's place is on Earth, fighting for justice as Mega Man.

=== Tribe ===

The second series follows the events of the second game focusing on the lost continent of Mu. The ancient civilization vanished ages ago, and a few of its remnants still exist as myths and legends called UMAs (Unidentified Mystery Animals similar to FM-ians that also have the ability to fuse with humans). The UMAs begin merging with humans in order to search for the treasures of Mu, the powerful OOPArts, which will give them the power to revive Mu. After Geo and Omega-Xis encounter several unusual enemies, they meet a professor named Doctor Vega who sends them on a quest to find the OOPArts and stop the UMAs. Using the OOPArts, Mega Man is able to take new forms, primarily the sword-wielding Thunder Zerker form. Near the end, Geo discovers that Doctor Vega and her accomplice Hollow are manipulating Geo to use the OOPArts for the revival of Mu and the devastating force known as Le Mu. But Mega Man combines the three OOPArts together, forming Tribe King, and uses this new power to stop Le Mu and seal Mu once more. The series premiered November 3, immediately after the original series' conclusion, and concluded March 29, 2008.

== Characters ==
An image depicting many of the series' main characters. From left to right, top row: Hope, Kelvin, Aaron, Copper, Omega-Xis; bottom row: Pat, Luna, Bud, Zack, Sonia, and Geo

=== Geo Stelar and Omega-Xis ===
Geo Stelar: Voiced by: Fuyuka Oura (Japanese); Jason Spisak (English)
Omega-Xis: Voiced by: Kentarō Itō (Japanese); Kyle Hebert (English)

Geo Stelar, known as Subaru Hoshikawa (星河 スバル, Hoshikawa Subaru) in Japan, is the main protagonist of the Star Force series. A gentle but a bit lonely fifth-grade student, Geo mourns the disappearance of his father that occurred three years prior, and has neglected school as a result. After being confronted by his classmates who pester him to return to school, he heads to an observing platform where he discovers the survivor AM-ian Omega-Xis by donning the Visualizer glasses left to him by his father, which allows him to view the EM Wave World. Omega-Xis, having stolen the mysterious Andromeda Key from the FM King, claims to have knowledge of the boy's missing parent. The two are able to merge becoming Star Force Mega Man, Shooting Star Rockman (シューティングスター・ロックマン, Shūtingu Sutā Rokkuman) in the Japanese version. Geo uses this newfound power to protect his friends and others from the invading FM-ians. Aided by Sonia Strumm and Lyra, they combat such threats as the forces of the FMian king, Cepheus, as well as the minions of Dr. Vega and the Dealers of Mr. King. Sonia and Luna have been shown to have feelings for him, though he is seen to be oblivious. Like any 10-year-old, however, any mentioning of either not only leaves him confused, but embarrassed as well. In third game, he is officially allied with the Satella Police and is registered under Project TC—a registry of those allowed to legally perform Wave Change—as No. 003. In the manga, Geo's back-story remains the same. However, he is more ambitious about building up the strength to find his father. Geo goes after the "Star Force," a power being offered to the winner of the Wave Coliseum, a tournament pitting various radio wave humans against each other in battle. Also, as the manga is aimed at a younger audience, Omega-Xis is a lot more comical.

Omega-Xis, known as Warrock (ウォーロック, Wōrokku) in the Japanese version, is an AM-ian and survivor of the Planet AM's annihilation; unlike FM-ians, AM-ians are able to turn humans into EM waves without fusing with them. At first, Omega has no feelings towards the Earth or its people, including Geo, with his only concern being the safety of the Andromeda Key; however, he slowly begins to change and care for Geo and the others.

Geo and Omega-Xis, in their Mega Man form, appear in Super Smash Bros. for Nintendo 3DS, Super Smash Bros. for Wii U, and Super Smash Bros. Ultimate as part of Mega Man's Final Smash called Mega Legends alongside MegaMan.EXE from MegaMan NT Warrior, Mega Man X, Mega Man Volnutt from Mega Man Legends, Proto Man, and Bass.

=== Sonia Strumm and Lyra ===
Sonia Strumm Voiced by: Misato Fukuen (Japanese); Wendee Lee (English)
Lyra Voiced by: Kyōko Hikami (Japanese); Cindy Robinson (English)

Sonia Strumm, known as Misora Hibiki (響 ミソラ, Hibiki Misora) in the original version and Sonia Sky in the dubbed anime version, is a popular rock star who, like Geo, is also depressed over the loss of a parent, her mother, which leads them to establish a friendship. She is similar to Mayl Sakurai in the Battle Network series. In terms of demeanor, Sonia is quite the opposite of Geo: spunky, outspoken, and mischievous. Sonia seems to be romantically interested in Geo, shown by the fact that she has asked Geo out on dates several times. Sonia also throws herself in front of one of Queen Ophiuca's attacks to protect Geo, and as a result is poisoned. In the second game, Sonia again asks Geo to go a date to Wilshire Hills. In this game, Sonia seems more blatant about their relationship. She once asked Geo who he likes better between an argument with Luna. She has also shown jealousy when Geo is with a girl or Luna alone during his mission of finding the OOPArts. Sonia is constantly pressured by her money-starved manager, leading Lyra to manipulate her into transforming into Harp Note, Lyra Note in the English anime, and attack people throughout the city. In the second game, Hollow blackmails her into working for Vega in exchange for Geo's safety. When Mega Man finds her in the Bermuda Maze, she claims that she doesn't want to be found and cuts off their Brother Band. Later, when Mega Man is lured out by Hollow and Rogue, Harp Note rescues him and transports him back to Echo Ridge. When Mega Man goes back to the Bermuda Maze, he defeats Harp Note. There, she explains she was following Vega's orders to protect to which Geo replies how her betrayal did not protect him. She also helps Mega Man find Mu's location in the Bermuda Maze afterwards. In the third game, Sonia is officially allied with the Satella Police and is registered under Project TC—a registry of those who are allowed to legally perform Wave Change—as No. 004. She also is an actress and appears on a TV drama. Notably, all of the songs sung during the anime are sung by Misato Fukuen, and twice, once during the anime and once during the games, Misora Hibiki is portrayed actually singing the theme songs, the latter case done through printed vocals.

Lyra, known as Harp (ハープ, Hāpu) in the Japanese version, is based on the constellation Lyra. She is an FM-ian who used to work for the FM King and often hides in Sonia's guitar. Her form is a cross between a harp and a note. She is shown to act like a high status old lady, whom gets into arguments with Omega-Xis. When she first met Sonia, Lyra tries unsuccessfully to invade Sonia's heart, so is forced to take control of her while she sleeps. Following her defeat by Mega Man, Lyra becomes an ally of Omega-Xis.

=== Friends ===
==== Luna Platz ====
Voiced by: Kana Ueda (Japanese); Melissa Fahn (English)

Luna Platz, known as Luna Shirogane (白金 ルナ, Shirogane Runa) in the Japanese version, is the perky and bossy fifth-grade class president of Echo Ridge Elementary (Kodama Elementary in the Japanese version) and wears a short blue dress with a red necktie and a green greed jewel. In the beginning of the game and anime, she constantly tries to get Geo to come to school, claiming that it is her job to get him there. When Geo finally comes to school, Luna basically treats Geo like another flunky. Luna openly admits she adores Mega Man from the second he saved her. However, throughout the game, it is constantly implied that Luna has developed strong feelings for Geo, stemming from Geo's declaration that he would protect her, and various times other times. Her English last name is a play on her original last name, the kanji of which mean "platinum" (the word "shirogane" means silver). As the class president, most of her friends refer to her as "The Prez", or simply "Prez".

In the anime, Luna was infatuated with Mega Man after he saved her life, though unaware of his secret identity. It was this weakness that she is targeted by "Ophiucus" during one of Sonia's concerts, taking advantage of Luna's desire to see her hero and her jealousy over Lyra Note, who she believes may be romantically involved with Mega Man. Even as "Ophiucus Queen", Luna still had retained her crush on Mega Man, and in the fight with Mega Man, actually flirted with him more than attacking. Luna, after witnessing Mega Man change back to Geo goes into self-denial of seeing it though Zack and Bud were present at the time. Luna also seems to like Geo, making food for him and bickering with Lyra Note over who likes Mega Man more.

In the game, because of her involvements with numerous FM-ian incidents, her parents transferred her to a new school. She keeps this painful news away from her friends. At the mall, she observes Geo and Sonia while they attend a jungle exhibit, and tailed them out of jealously. There she has an unexpected run-in with her parents, and the confrontation prompts Ophiucus to appear before her. Ophiucus promises to make Luna's parents pay, and Luna allows Ophiucus to invade her heart, merging the together to create Ophiucus Queen (オヒュカス・クイーン, Ohyukasu Kuīn). Queen Ophiucus holds Luna's parents hostage demanding Omega-Xis hand over the Andromeda Key. Mega Man eventually beats Queen Ophiucus, but she tries to persuade Omega-Xis to hand over the key so they may use its power together. Omega-Xis refuses, and Ophiucus is defeated by Gemini on a whim. Luna then regains consciousness, and hugs Mega Man as thanks. However, the Wave World deteriorates as they return to the real world, and shows Luna hugging Geo, who ends up being the second human (after Sonia) to know Mega Man's true identity. Queen Ophiucus makes a second appearance in Mega Man Star Force 2 as a main story boss. Hyde kidnaps Luna in an attempt to lure Mega Man out. When Mega Man finds Luna, Hyde has Ophiuca's residual waves take over Luna, turning her back into Queen Ophiucus. Upon defeating her, Geo unlocks the Tribe-On power with Luna's help.

===== Vogue =====
Vogue (Mode in the Japanese version) is the Wizard companion to Luna Platz who appears in the third game. Vogue's appearance is that of a bunny in a hat. Vogue is a support Wizard and Luna is thus unable to perform a Wave Change with Vogue. Vogue helps Luna keep track of important events and her daily schedule.

==== Bud Bison ====
Voiced by: Shintaro Ohata (Japanese); Robbie Rist (English)

Bud Bison, known as Gonta Ushijima (牛島 ゴン太, Ushijima Gonta) in the Japanese version, is a gruff bully who attempts to intimidate Geo into returning to school. Bud is very much like Dex from Battle Network, as he is, at first, he is a bully character who eventually makes amends with the main character. He is quite a dim witted student who depends on Luna to get him out of trouble or explaining things to him. He has a crush on Luna. The last name Ushi means cow or cattle in Japanese. His English adaptation of his last name refers to a Bison.

In Mega Man Star Force, Bud tried to threaten Geo to go to school for Luna. Omega-Xis's brash personality causes Geo to punch Bud, leaving him embarrassed and his companions questioning their association with him, with Luna threatening to cut off their Brother Band, which Bud feels would make him a nobody. Taurus acts on his anguish, offering him the power to get Geo back. Under Taurus' control, Bud begins randomly destroying red objects in the real world. When he, Luna, and Zack go on patrol, they encounter Geo where Bud transforms and escapes into the cyber network of a truck that Luna and Zack are riding in, driving it recklessly through the city, attempting to run Geo over. Afterwards, Bud has little recollection of the incident, only that he did some terrible things.

Taurus Fire reappears in Mega Man Star Force 2 as a main story boss. Taurus's residual waves take over Bud during an eating competition and transform him back into Taurus Fire. He also re-appears in Mega Man Star Force 3 as a Wizard for Bud. Taurus is loaned to Geo to defeat Diamond Ice. He is registered under Project TC as No. 005.

In the anime, he grows jealous over Luna spending so much time with Geo upon his return to school as Taurus (an FM-ian who is number one in terms of power amongst his kind) arrived upon sensing Bud. After being thrown into a hallway by Omega-Xis in the first confrontation, Taurus enters Bud's body and uses him as Taurus Fire until he is defeated and Taurus is forced out of him. Later, Taurus takes on the form of W Bud while gathering minus energy to recreate the Andromeda Key. He is the first FM-ian to be ultimately deleted by Gemini Spark in order to refill the real Andromeda Key with minus energy.

In the manga, Bud encounters a gang of street thugs who bully him and an innocent puppy. Taurus subsequently targets Bud who desires the power to overcome the bullies. However, after being defeated by Mega Man, Taurus becomes an ally of Omega-Xis's and reveals that the "Star Force" will help Geo find his father.

==== Zack Temple ====
Voiced by: Yūko Gibu (Japanese); Yuri Lowenthal (English)

Zack, known as Kizamaro Saishoin (最小院 キザマロ, Saishōin Kizamaro) in the Japanese version, is a nerdy and condescending student who is more or less one of Luna's flunkies. Zack seems to also have a problem with his height and tries numerous ways to get taller. Zack also appears to be afraid of heights. Zack usually gets information off of his own website, the "Zackpedia". After discovering Geo was Mega Man, Zack starts to admire him more. He, Luna, Bud, and Geo usually help test out Tom Dubius's new upgrade for the Star Carrier. Zack is the only one of Geo's immediate friends who has not Wave Changed, against their will or otherwise, though he does get a Wizard named "Pedia" in the third game, thus making a pun with their combined names, "Zackpedia", the name of his website.

===== Pedia =====
Pedia is the Wizard companion to Zack Temple. As expected, Pedia is a very intelligent Wizard that supplies Zack and his companions with information.

==== Patrick Sprigs ====
Voiced by: Yuki Kaida (Japanese); Danielle Judovits (English)

Patrick Sprigs, known as Tsukasa Futaba (双葉 ツカサ, Futaba Tsukasa) in the original Japanese version, was abandoned by parents in a junkyard on Dream Island as an infant; because of that, Pat developed split personality disorder, the other more evil personality named Rey Sprigs, known as Hikaru Futaba (双葉 ヒカル, Futaba Hikaru) in the original version. While generally nice, Pat is pushed by Rey to hate the world, and has also been in contact with Gemini for an extended period prior to Geo's meeting with Omega-Xis. Once merged, Pat and Rey separate into two separate bodies representing the form of Gemini Spark. Pat's personality works as Gemini Spark White, while Rey is personified in Gemini Spark Black. It is their alliance with Gemini that causes Geo to doubt trusting others for a time. His original name is a play on "futagoza", which is the Japanese name for the Gemini constellation.

Gemini Spark appears in the game's sequel at Whazzap Village as a friendly, optional boss. He requests Geo to fight him in order to help gain control over his darker personality Rey. Apparently after beating his SP form, he gains near full control, with Rey only bursting out under stress. This means that Pat now has control over the resurrected Gemini. Pat does not make an appearance in the third game; the only explanation given is that he's "gone," and his empty seat at Echo Elementary is filled by Jack.

In the anime, the Rey personality is virtually absent, with Gemini becoming Gemini Spark Black, and with Pat seemingly a willing participant in the FM Planet's plans. Rescued by Gemini after being run over by a truck and left to die in the ensuing blaze, Pat decided to form an alliance with Gemini. Unlike Geo, Pat had already mastered Electromagnetic Wave Change before they met. Gemini Spark was easily the strongest of the FMains, overwhelming Mega Man in their first two battles, and even in later fights the only Mega Man could win was using the Star Force. Although the other FM-ians plan to destroy Earth, Pat and Gemini secretly intend to destroy the FM Planet by taking the Andromeda Key for themselves. They give Cancer a fake Andromeda key after the real was destroyed by Omega-Xis, telling Cancer that the one they gave him was real (and keeping the real one for themselves) and recreating the EM Wave Conversion System for the FM-ians. Pat and Gemini then remain behind the scenes waiting for the FM-ians to gather enough minus energy for the Andromeda Key. However, the FM King Cepheus eventually calls the FM-ians back to Planet FM, and Gemini then betrays the other FM-ians and delete them all except for Cancer, who manage to escape, and use them as energy to restore the Andromeda Key. Gemini Spark White eventually sacrifices his "Black" counterpart to restore fully Andromeda and destroy Earth when the not at full power Andromeda was stopped by the three Sages of AM. However, Geo and Omega-Xis destroyed the Andromeda Key while Cepheus regressed Gemini Spark White back to human form and erased Pat's memories.

In the manga, Gemini Spark only has one embodiment that alternates between the darker, more aggressive Black (B) and the calmer, more mellow White (W). (The two personalities usually dispute over control of the body.) When Gemini Spark was a child, he was abandoned in space and found by Crown Thunder. They shared a bond through their control of lightning, and thus Crown Thunder raised him. Considering Gemini Spark has existed as Gemini Spark since his youth, it is unlikely that Pat and Gemini exist independently in the manga.

=== AMAKEN ===
==== Aaron Boreal ====
Voiced by: Hiroshi Tsuchida

Aaron Boreal, known as Mamoru Amachi (天地 守, Amachi Mamoru) in the Japanese version, is a good friend of Kelvin Stellar, Geo's father. He is the head researcher and founder of AMAKEN (天地研究所, Amachi Kenkyūjo), Aaron delivers the news of Kelvin's disappearance to Geo and his mother, and bestows upon Geo the Visualizer that was left to him by his father. He aids Geo in reaching a space station to prevent the FM King from destroying the Earth by using a transmitter in its debris on Dream Island. He appears in the second game as a minor character, where he upgrades Geo's Star Carrier. In the third game he works in the WAZA command center with fellow AMAKEN employee Tom Dubius, and does his part in helping Geo to get to Meteor G. His English name is a pun on the Aurora Borealis.

==== Tom Dubius ====
Voiced by: Norihisa Mori

Tom Dubius, known as Shinsuke Utagai (宇田海 深佑, Utagai Shinsuke) in the Japanese version is a worker at AMAKEN laboratory and is paranoid of those around him. This is due to his past where a man used their brother band to steal his work and presented it as his own. Thus, Tom is afraid to open up to others and have his work stolen, specifically his latest invention, the Flap Pack, a flying pack powered by EM waves. Aaron approaches him asking if he'd like to form a Brother Band, which Tom, while happy at the idea, is still a little doubtful, at which time Cygnus approaches him. When he misunderstands coworker Aaron as claiming the jacket as his own, Cygnus reappears before him, telling him that society's nature is to betray, and together they trap Aaron and the tourists visiting the labs in the Space Simulation chamber (which mimics space, including the room having no oxygen) by forcing them to dance in circles. Hoping to earn Tom's trust, Aaron removes his helmet in the Space Simulation chamber (which, as it turns out, Tom already filled with oxygen), a shocked Dubius realizes the truth, releasing Cygnus' hold over him.

Cygnus Wing reappears in Mega Man Star Force 3 as an optional boss, registered under Project TC as No. 020. Cygnus is now Dubius's wizard.

Tom's anime background is the same as the game, except that Cygnus has him believe that everyone is against him and Tom attempts to crash a satellite on the city in retaliation. Though Tom realized the truth in time, Cygnus took full control over the human's body and escaped. Cygnus acted as the leader of the FM-ians on earth, using Tom to build an "EM Wave Conversion System" that allows his fellow FM-ians to transform into EM Wave Humans without the need for host bodies, directing them to seize the Pegasus, Leo, and Dragon satellites. But eventually, Cygnus reveals his never cared for his minions once he gets the Andromeda Key, almost killing them when he goes to destroy the earth. But eventually, Cygnus was killed by Mega Man.

In the manga, Cygnus Wing appears as an opponent of Mega Man's in the Wave Coliseum tournament. Cygnus Wing's manga personality exhibits a mixture of effeminate mannerisms and slight sadism. Also, Cygnus Wing is lacking his wings for unknown reasons.

=== FM-ian hosts ===
Mitch Shepar
Voiced by: Kenji Hamada
Mitch Shepar, known as Michimori Ikuta (育田 道徳, Ikuta Michinori) in the Japanese version, is an idealistic and friendly teacher. He has seven children of his own and sees his students as if they were his own kids. He often tells stories instead of teaching by the books, claiming that he does not want to raise kids who can only study. In the game, the Principal tells him he will lose his job as a teacher for not using the Study Wave (an EM wave that stimulates brain activity). Mitch Shepar breaks down due to stress and meets Libra who tells him that he must abandon his ideals in order to succeed. Together with the FM-ian, his personality shifts to extremely strict, and he puts his class into a trance of non-stop studying using the Study Wave. After being defeated by Mega Man and seeing his students concern for his well being, Shepar realizes that he was wrong and drives Libra from his heart. In the anime, "Mitch Shepard" lectures at Echo Ridge Laboratory. When Libra (an FM-ian who often weighs decisions in an "A or B" scenario before taking action) becomes injured in a battle against Mega Man, he takes control of Shepar's body to hide while he recovers. Once Libra is able to take the form of W Shepar, he hosts a game show under the name Mr. Lovely that Sonia is invited to participate in. He ends up being deleted by Gemini Spark in order to refill the Andromeda Key. A recurring habit that Libra Scales had was to give others or himself a choice of A or B in a situation, though the choices were always the same (A being annihilation and B being destruction Cooper and his officers, and making both the choices for himself and A and B "run" when fighting Mega Man when used the Star Force).
Damian Wolfe
Voiced by: Tetsu Inada
Damian Wolfe, known as Jūrō Ogami (尾上 十郎, Ogami Jūrō) in the original Japanese version, is a gardener and is employed by the owners of the jungle exhibit that Geo and Sonia visit. His introduction to Wolf was abrupt, as the FM-ian just showed up in his Transer one day. He asks Geo to fight him in order to quell his ferocity, which he claims to experience every full moon. Damian and Wolf reappeared as Wolf Woods in Mega Man Star Force 3, as according to the website, he is registered under Project TC as No. 011. He now works as a gardener. In the anime, he works for the family of a young woman named Himeka (Samantha in the dub, voiced by Stephanie Sheh), who he also courts as a possible suitor. Targeted off-screen by Wolf (a particularly ferocious and uncontrollable FM-ian), Damian automatically undergoes Electromagnetic Wave Change (though its effects can be suppressed) whenever he sees anything in the shape of a full moon due to the FM-ian's inability to fully corrupt his heart. He fought Mega Man and Lyra Note at the mall, but Samantha intervened and allowed Damian to break free from Wolf.
Jean Couronne XIV
Voiced by: Nobuaki Fukuda
Jean Couronne Welmond Jour Jovonne XIV (ジャン・クローヌ・ヴェルモンド・ジョルジョワーヌ14世, Jan Kurōnu Verumondo Jorujowānu Jūyon-sei) is a deceased French king. Jean Couronne's ship sunk off the coast of Dream Island. His spirit haunts the junkyard, but the circumstances of his meeting with Crown are unknown. He requests that Geo fight him because as it is a family tradition to die fighting, he can not rest in peace until he dies in combat. In the anime, Courrone, though never appearing in the flesh, so to speak, is said to be a king who was overthrown in a revolution and exiled to sea. His ghost is said to guard a treasure buried underneath an amusement park, in turn built over the ruins of Couronne's sunken ship. He is targeted by Crown (an FM-ian who enjoys threatening the weak) off-screen, who gains an immortal vessel in merging with the man's skull.

=== Satellite Admins ===
Pegasus Magic Voiced by: Kunihiko Yasui
Leo Kingdom Voiced by: Tōru Furusawa
Dragon Sky Voiced by: Tōru Ōkawa

The Satellite Admins (サテライト管理者, Sateraito Kanrisha) are survivors of the Planet AM's annihilation, named Pegasus Magic (ペガサス・マジック, Pegasasu Majikku), Leo Kingdom (レオ・キングダム, Reo Kingudamu), and Dragon Sky (ドラゴン・スカイ, Doragon Sukai). Oddly, their names are 2 words rather than one (Leo, Dragon, and Pegasus), titles usually reserved for wave changed humans.

Surveyors of the three satellites in Earth's orbit that keep the EM Wave World in check and the wise men of the Planet AM, the Admins question whether Geo and Omega-Xis are strong enough to take on the FM forces, and as a test, Mega Man must battle with one of them in a weakened "shadow" state. When victorious, Mega Man is given the legendary "Star Force," a power which allows him to take on the appearance and abilities of the Satellite Admins themselves. The transformations are Ice Pegasus, Fire Leo and Green Dragon. The Satellite Admins appear in the secret area in Mega Man Star Force 3.

In the anime, the Satellite Admins save Geo from the hands of Cygnus Wing as he was obtaining the Andromeda Key from Omega-Xis. They then bestowed the power of Star Force to allow Geo and Omega-Xis to harness their power. An example how strong Mega Man got from using the Star Force when he first used it, and easily defeated all the FM-ians in one fight. He never lost a fight when had the Star Force until he fought the Andromeda. The Satellite Admins would not be seen again until Gemini Spark re-activated the Andromeda Key using the minus energy of the deleted FM-ians. In a last-ditch effort to subdue Andromeda, the Satellite Admins used a kamikaze technique to stop Andromeda at cost of his own lives. This appeared to work until Gemini Spark White deleted his other half in order to harness his minus energy and revive Andromeda.

=== Kelvin Stelar ===
Voiced by: Takehiro Onishi

Kelvin Stelar, known as Daigo Hoshikawa (星河 大吾, Hoshikawa Daigo) in the original version, is Geo's father. He is a respected researcher who mysteriously vanished while trying to make friendly contact with extraterrestrials through the use of Brother Band, a type of EM wave technology. He had a desire to visit the Planet FM, but was unable to do so because he was human, so he pleaded with Omega-Xis to be turned into an EM Wave Human. Just as Kelvin was transforming, the space station where he was working was attacked by Taurus and his spirit was left to wander. The event left his wife devastated, though she continued to nurture her son—albeit worriedly—on her own. He was absorbed by the Crimson Dragon while in space, battling it the whole time, but was eventually freed and finally returns home in Mega Man Star Force 3.

=== Hope Stelar ===
Voiced by: Akiko Kimura (Japanese); Michelle Ruff (English)

Hope Stelar, known in Japan as (Akane Hoshikawa (星河 あかね, Hoshikawa Akane), Geo's mother. In both the game and anime, she wishes for Geo to go back to school, but respects his wishes to stay at home. In the anime, she is shown to be a great lover of TV, and to Geo's distaste, likes to order a lot of stuff via television. She is shown to have a love for cooking, though Geo only partially likes some of what she cooks. Hope is also shown to be a bit of a tease with others, especially her son, whom on a few occasions has been teased about his female friends. The anime reduces the time since Kelvin's disappearance from three years to three months. Because of this change, the impact of Kelvin's disappearance is greatly diminished.

=== Claud Pincer and Cancer ===
Claud Pincer Voiced by: Wasabi Mizuta
Cancer Voiced by: Daiki Nakamura

Claud Pincer, known as Chiyokichi Hasami (狭見 千代吉, Hasami Chiyokichi) in the original Japanese version, is a boy who frequents at the Big Wave store in Echo Ridge. He has no backstory in the game; he simply wished to test his own power against Geo/Mega Man, though Omega-Xis deduced that since FM-ians are drawn to a human's loneliness, Claud met Cancer because he apparently had no friends, which Claud verified. While Cancer does not have evil intentions like many of his FM brethren, he and his human partner are boastful and pride themselves highly on their skills in battle. He also makes an appearance in Mega Man Star Force 2 as an optional boss on the slopes of Grizzly Peak. Cancer Noise is an available Noise Change in Mega Man Star Force 3. In the anime, he is a cocky and determined third grade student who was saddened by his lack of friends, resulting in his encounter with Cancer (who accidentally merged with Claud when he was trying to merge with the security guard throwing Claud out of Sonia Strumm's concert). He is a die-hard fan of Sonia's and is targeted by Cancer after failing to get into one of her concerts without a ticket where Cancer was trying to target the security guard. Unlike other EM Wave Humans, Cancer Bubble retained Claud's voice and personality, and the transformation is rarely complete (thus, Cancer Bubble is often still wearing Claud's clothes or hat).

Cancer (キャンサー, Kyansā) is based on the constellation Cancer. His form is that of a crab. When fused with Claud, he becomes Cancer Bubble (キャンサー・バブル, Kyansā Baburu). In the anime, from his bond with Claud, Cancer also ended becoming a fan of Sonia and even seemed to have a crush on her at times (he was however, unaware that Sonia was also Lyra Note, whom he had a dislike for until he learned the truth). Later in the series, Cancer Bubble takes Cygnus' place as leader to oversee the recreation of the Andromeda Key. He is one of the two FM-ians to evade being deleted by Gemini when it came to powering the Andromeda Key since he went to get Mega Man's help. Later in the Tribe series, Cancer becomes an agent for Sonia, helping around her home. Overall, he's the comic relief of the villains (in battle he's depicted as almost completely harmless), much in the same vein as BubbleMan in the series' predecessor, MegaMan NT Warrior. Furthermore, in the Japanese versions, Cancer commonly ends statements with the word "buku," very similar to BubbleMan's tendency to end statements with "puku" (both buku and puku are Japanese onomatopoeia for a bubble bursting).

=== Kidd Gruff and Goat Foo ===
Kidd Gruff, known as Kenta Yagi (八木 ケン太, Yagi Kenta) in the original Japanese version, is a young boy from a small town in the Loch Mess area. He met his FM-ian partner, Goat Foo (ゴート, Gōto), in Alohaha, but when they combine, they become Kung-Foo Kid (Goat Kung-Fu (ゴート・カンフー, Gōto Kanfū) in the Japanese version), a wood-based martial artist known for his exceptional speed. Kung-Foo Kid was the winning entry in a Japanese contest sponsored by Capcom. He is an optional boss battle in the game. He doesn't make an appearance in the anime. His Japanese last name Yagi, is the Japanese word for "goat". His English name refers to both a "kid" (a young goat) and to the fairy tale Three Billy Goats Gruff.

=== Detective Bob Copper ===
Voiced by: Tomoyuki Shimura

Bob Copper, known as Heiji Goyoda (五陽田 ヘイジ, Goyoda Heiji) in the Japanese version, is a detective and an investigator of incidents involving FM-ians and suspects that Geo, who is often present during the incidents, may be involved. In the anime, Cooper make an incorrect assumption that Mega Man was a criminal and often tried (and failed miserably) to arrest him. Although like everyone else he was never able to figure that Geo was Mega Man, he did grow suspicious of Geo. In the manga, Copper succeeds in capturing both Mega Man and Gemini Spark, and pits the two against one another in a Wave Battle. Copper is pretty stubborn and refuses to trust EM-creatures. His motto he follows for the EM-creatures are "Once you have seen one you see them all". His last name in Japanese translates to "Trouble all around".

=== Arthur C. Eos and Acid ===
Ace Voiced by: Tetsuya Kakihara

Arthur C. Eos (Shidō Akatsuki in the Japanese version), known as A.C. Eos, or simply "Ace" is a member of the Zero Satella Police and is partnered with the Wizard being known as Acid. Using the Ace Program, they are able to Wave Change to form Acid Ace, and are registered under Project TC as No. 001.

Unlike other EM beings, Acid is more material than EM waves. This is due to him being a man-made Wizard. While normally, Real Wizards cannot wave change with humans (A status normally reserved for real EM Beings such as AMians, FMians, and Murians), Acid was designed specifically for that purpose, making him more of a Manmade FM-ian. Despite this, Wave Changing puts Ace's body and mind under extreme stress, tearing his body apart, and only allowing him to stay Wave changed for a short amount of time.

Ace created the Hunter VG, a device replacing the Transer from Mega Man Star Force 2. Acid is infected with Noise by Joker and thus becomes Acid Ace B/Acid Illegal. Mega Man defeats the Noise that infected Acid Ace and he is returned to normal. Later, he absorbs the self-destruct energy emitted by Joker to save Geo and the others, but is deleted in the process. However, he is presumed to be alive when the credits shows a screenshot of Ace in the hospital with Queen Tia and Dr. Goodall at his bedside.

Despite Eos's generally cheerful and goofy demeanor, he used to be a member of Dealers before leaving and joining the Satella Police. In the past, he used to have a relationship with Queen Tia. He has a fondness for candy, particularly the "Mega Snack", an amazingly cheap candy at only 10 Zenny each, but comes in a wide variety of unusual flavors, such as, when noted by Geo and Omega-xis, Pepperoni and Taco Cheese.

=== Woody Boffin and Magnes ===
Woody Boffin (Manabu Kino in Japan) is an employee of Echo Ridge Elementary, where he works in the rocket lab. His goal is to send a rocket into space. He operates two Wizards to help him in his duties: Magnes (Magnets in Japan) and his "brother" Coil. Corrupted by a Noise Card, courtesy of Queen Tia and Jack, Magnes mutates into a battle form known as Spade Magnes (Spade Magnets in Japan), and can attack with dual-wielded swords and missiles. Mega Man manages to revert him back to normal, and Magnes resumes his original goal of launching the rocket. The rocket is later used to travel to the Meteor G core.

=== Belle and Ice ===
Belle (Suzuka in Japan) is a child TV actress, and Ice is a Wizard who functions as her manager. During the shooting for a TV drama co-starring Sonia Strumm, Jack uses a Noise Card to infect her with Noise, whereupon she mutates into Diamond Ice (Dia Iceburn in Japan), a pixie-like battle form that utilizes ice and cold to fight. She sabotages the show's projector and drops the temperature below freezing in order in an attempt to kill Sonia, but with Taurus's help, Mega Man manages to defrost the stage and defeat the crazed Wizard. Afterwards, Ice realizes that she was a little over her head and attempts to resign as Belle's manager because of her actions until Belle points out how much she cares about her.

=== Strong ===
A Wizard who operates the environmental system in the temple on Alohaha Island (Shisaa Island in Japan). A Noise Card mutates him into the hulking Club Strong battle form. Though Mega Man manages to defeat him and revert him back to normal, Strong is soon deleted by Joker so that Queen Tia can harvest his leftover Crimson energy. He is later restored, albeit not to his original self.

=== Antagonists ===
==== FM-ians ====
Taurus
Voiced by: Nobuyuki Hiyama (Japanese); Neil Kaplan (English)
Taurus, known as Ox (オックス, Okkusu) in the Japanese version, is based on the constellation Taurus. He is an extremely strong armored bull with the bashfulness of a bull as well. He emits fire to propel himself forward or to burn his enemies. When he fuses with Bud, he becomes Taurus Fire, known as Ox Fire (オックス・ファイア, Okkusu Faia) in the original version. Taurus is later deleted by Gemini. In Tribe, Taurus reappears alive and appears behind Bud as he attends Sonia Strumm's concert with the other FM-ians. He returns in the second game via residual wave data left on Bud, which allowed him to turn back into Taurus Fire unintentionally. He also returns in the third game by order of Cepheus, and makes amends with Bud, becoming his Wizard. He also appears as a Noise Change in the third game.
Cygnus
Voiced by: Nobutoshi Canna
Cygnus (キグナス, Kigunasu) is an FM-ian based on the constellation Cygnus. When he fuses with Tom, they become Cygnus Wing (キグナス・ウィング, Kigunasu Wingu). Cygnus reappears in Mega Man Star Force 3 as a Noise Change for Mega Man, as well as an optional boss, Cygnus' residual data apparently converted to Wizard format for Tom Dubius to use freely with transcode 020.
Gemini
Voiced by: Atsushi Kisaichi
Gemini (ジェミニ, Jemini) is based on the constellation Gemini. When fused with Patrick, they separate into two and become Gemini Spark (ジェミニ・スパーク, Jemini Supāku). After his defeat, Gemini is restored by the FM King Cepheus, along with the other FM warriors. In an attempt to stop Geo and Omega-Xis from going to space and fighting Andromeda, he faces them both, using memory data to re-assume the form of Gemini Spark. However, due to Pat's intervention, Geo and Omega-Xis are able to fight back and destroy Gemini, though he is later revived once again by Cepheus. Pat then rejoins Geo's friends. In the game's final scene, it is revealed that it was Gemini who preyed on Cepheus's paranoia and drove him to destroy the Planet AM, thus revealed to be the true main antagonist in the game. Mega Man, in the third game, is able to obtain Gemini Noise Change. In Tribe, Gemini reappears alive and appears behind Bud as he attends Sonia Strumm's concert with the other FM-ians.
Libra
Voiced by: Hiroshi Shirokuma
Libra (リブラ, Ribura) is an old, brown-looking FM-ian with a balance for a Torso. He is based on Libra. When he takes over Mitch, they become Libra Scales, known as Libra Balance (リブラ・バランス, Ribura Baransu) in the Japanese version. He is later deleted by Gemini. In Tribe, Libra reappears alive and appears behind Mitch as he attends Sonia Strumm's concert with the other FM-ians. Libra reappears in Mega Man Star Force 3 as a Noise Change.
Wolf
Voiced by: Tokuyoshi Kawashima
Wolf (ウルフ, Urufu) is based on the constellation Wolf (ウルフ, Urufu). When they fuse, they become Wolf Woods, known as Wolf Forest (ウルフ・フォレスト, Urufu Foresto) in the original Japanese version. He is eventually deleted by Gemini Spark for minus energy. In Tribe, Wolf reappears alive and was seen with the other FM-ians attending the concert of Sonia Strumm where he is behind Damian. Wolf reappears as a Noise Change for Mega Man in the third game, as well as an optional boss, with Damion Wolfe registered with Transcode 011.
Crown
Voiced by: Shigenori Sōya

Crown (クラウン, Kuraun)is an FM-ian based on the Corona Borealis. When fused with Jean Couronne's remains, they become Crown Thunder (クラウン・サンダー, Kuraun Sandā). In the game, he is one of three optional bosses in Mega Man Star Force. In the anime, after being defeated, Crown is later able to take the form of W Couronne, but his body is cold and dead with various arrows protruding from it, causing humans to flee at the sight of him. Like Cancer, he was a fan of Sonia. Gemini Spark ultimately deletes him in order to fill the Andromeda Key with minus energy. In Tribe, Crown reappears alive and appears behind Jean's ghost as he attends Sonia Strumm's concert with the other FM-ians. In the manga, Crown Thunder found Gemini Spark when he was a child, and through their bond of lightning, Crown Thunder decided to raise the child. Crown reappears in the third game as a Noise Change for Mega Man.

Virgo
Virgo, is based on the constellation Virgo. When she fuses with Queen Tia, she becomes Queen Virgo, known as Queen Virugo in the original version. She was disguised as Queen Tia's wizard and worked with her. Later, when Geo convinced Queen Tia to surrender her plan to destroy Earth's EM Technology, Virgo turned on her and attempted to destroy. Queen Tia was saved by the timely arrival of Rogue. She is revived by Sirius with the ability to EM Wave Change alone before being defeated by Mega Man once again.
Corvus
Corvus, is based on the constellation Corvus. He can EM Wave Change with Jack to become Jack Corvus. He acted as Jack's Wizard for most of the events of Mega Man Star Force 3, but he and Virgo are deleted by Rogue. He is later revived by Sirius with the ability to EM Wave Change without a host before being defeated by Mega Man once again.
Ophiuca
Voiced by: Kaoru Morota
Ophiuca (Ophiuchus in the anime version) is based on the serpent-tamer constellation, Ophiucus. Her form is that of a dark purple snake, she has the power to control snakes. After her defeat, Ophiuca takes on the form of Luna while gathering minus energy to recreate the Andromeda Key. During this time, Ophiuca often bickered with other FM-ians over how to spend money, and she herself also developed a love of shopping. Eventually, Ophiuca is deleted by Gemini Spark in order to fill the Andromeda Key, though her residual wave data existed on Luna, which, with sufficient force, could transform her back into Queen Ophiucus (Ophiucus Queen in the original version and Queen Ophiuca in the English games). In Tribe, Ophiuca reappears alive and appears behind Luna as she attends Sonia Strumm's concert with the other FM-ians. A Noise Change for her is available in Mega Man Star Force 3.

==== Cepheus ====
Voiced by: Kazusa Murai

Cepheus (ケフェウス, Kefeusu) is the FM King. His constellation is based on Cepheus. He is the original holder of the Andromeda Key, a device which permits access to a war-engine made up of EM waves throughout the universe known as Andromeda. Under Gemini's suggestion, he obliterated the Planet AM with Andromeda's assistance, and also ordered the assault on the space station from where Kelvin was trying to contact his home world. Cepheus viewed Brother Band as a means for humans to invade and conquer his planet, thus he sought to stop it by declaring war on Earth. He is rescued by Mega Man when Andromeda begins to overload, and turns over a new leaf when offered a hand in friendship. As a token of his appreciation, Cepheus leaves with the Satellite Admins to rebuild the Planet AM from its remnants. He returns in the third game—after it is beaten. Requesting help from Mega Man, he returns to earth due to defeat Sirius and stop a black hole attempting to devour the FM and (newly) recreated Planets AM.

In the anime, Cepheus does not appear until Gemini Spark is defeated. He reverts Gemini Spark White to his human form and erases his memories from after he met Gemini. While at first seeing the Brother Band as a threat, he turns a new leaf after being exposed to it. He comes to Earth to stop Andromeda from destroying it, apologizing to humans for trying to destroy them when they offered friendship.

==== Solo and Laplace ====
Solo Voiced by: Yūki Tai

Solo (ソロ, Soro) is a mysterious character introduced during the events of the second game and anime season as the rival character of the series and Anti-Hero of the series. He is the last descendant of the destroyed Mu continent, and is able to EM Wave Change without the aid of a wave being. In his transformed state, he is referred to as Rogue, known as Bly (ブライ, Burai) in the original Japanese version. In the game, he desires to collect the OOPArts in order to find out how Mu was destroyed, and so works with Vega to do so, crossing paths with Geo and Omega-Xis multiple times, thinking they are after Mu and his power. He prefers to work alone, and detests Geo for his devotion to his friends and his positive attitude towards bonds and Link Powers. Solo's abilities to see EM waves and Wave Change resulted in him being branded a monster and being brutalized and beaten by gangs, resulting in him closing his heart off to human contact, symbolized by the EM Wave Barrier he uses in combat. It is also revealed in the third game that Solo appears to be quite fond of video games as suggested when he calls Geo about his deleted saved game data and gets mad at Laplace for doing so.

In the third installment, he's joined by a new type of EM being (called "Wizards") named Laplace. Laplace is presumably an EM Being (UMA) freed from the Remnants of Mu when it was destroyed. Laplace was either drawn to Solo's loneliness, or the fact that he is the last Murian alive. Laplace differs from other EM Beings, being more electromagnetic 'light' than material, making him quite opposite to Acid. Since Solo can already perform Wave Change on his own, he does not Wave Change with Laplace. Rather, Laplace uses his Wizard abilities to transform into a large scimitar that Rogue uses as old broadsword's replacement. His goal is to eliminate Dealer, the reason being that they are misusing Murian technology. He somewhat reluctantly joins Geo's side in the struggle against Meteor G, and in the finale deletes Virgo and Corvus when they turn on their hosts and brings Jack and Queen Tia back to Earth. Throughout the game, Solo has saved Geo from a number of dangerous encounters, many of which Geo is oblivious to, though Solo mostly does so as an excuse for saying Geo was in his way. During the post-game content involving Sirius, Rogue shows up outside of the Black Hole Server with the intention of defeating Sirius and reclaiming a stolen piece of Murian metal, but does not intend to do so until after the black hole swallows up Planet FM. Upon being defeated, Rogue says that he and Geo will never see eye to eye, but admits that Geo is strong enough to protect his bonds and Link Power. Solo has been registered by the Satella Police's Project TC as No. 002, suggesting he attempted wave changing soon after the Hunter VG was installed and before Geo did. Rogue Noise is a secret Noise Change in Mega Man Star Force 3.

In the anime, Solo is even more of an enigma, as he appears to be working to collect the OOPArts by himself, and rarely speaks. He is shown to be quite powerful in combat, almost effortlessly defeating Geo upon their first encounter, and later again in a three-on-one fight against Geo, Sonia, and Cancer Bubble. However, Geo proved more than a match for Solo when he gained the Berserk Sword. He eventually disappears through a portal to Mu, and is discovered there by Geo and Sonia much later in stasis. He is then revealed to be the protector of the seal on Le Mu, and only pursued the OOPArts so that they could not be used to revive it. Though defeated by Hollow, he reappears to help Geo seal Le Mu back within Mu for once and for all.

==== Vega ====
Voiced by: Ai Orikasa

Dr. Vega, known as Doctor Orihime (ドクター・オリヒメ, Dokutā Orihime) in the original Japanese version, is the primary antagonist of the second Star Force game. She was a scientist from the Tanabata Kingdom whose research led to the creation of Matter Waves, materialized EM waves, but she disappeared after discovering Murian ruins. Her designs for Mu revolve around restoring it and using its power to form the Neo Mu Empire. Those who prove exceptional in some way would be allowed to become a citizen of the new Mu. Her plan required the OOPArt in order to unlock Mu from within the Bermuda Maze (the one involved depends on the version being played). To this end, she recruits Solo, the last living Murian, as well as giving UMA (Unidentified Mystery Animal) wave beings to individuals to carry out her bidding. After Le Mu (Ra Mu in the Japanese version) is defeated, it is revealed that her primary reason for reviving Mu is so that she could use its power to bring her dead lover Altair (the only person whom she ever formed a BrotherBand with), back to life. Altair, who sometimes referred to her by the pet name of "Vegalita", had to leave her in order to fight in a war. He died fighting in the war, and as a result, Vega became bitter, and ultimately blamed the world for his death, leading her to become a scientist, and after discovering Mu, she vowed to unleashed her vengeance leading to the events in the game. She had created Hollow as a replacement for her lover, Altair, hoping it would bring him back in a sense, but it had neither his personality or memories, but the image of him kept her from destroying him. Hollow would be her loyal follower, and Vega viewed him as such, until he sacrificed himself for her, making Vega realize that she had loved Hollow as well, not as Altair, but as his own person.

In the anime, she is introduced as a famous researcher who is known for her writings on ancient civilizations as well as the invention of the Radio Composer that Tom Dubius used when he was controlled by Cygnus. She recruited Geo (being able to figure out that he was really Mega Man) into helping her hunt down the OOPArts because she was worried of what would happen should Mu's "Ultimate Lifeform", Le Mu, be awakened. In reality, she wanted to awaken Le Mu and have it rule over the world as its god, eventually revealing this when she had Hollow take the Berserk Sword from Mega Man. In the end, she stayed behind on Mu rather than face imprisonment (as opposed to escaping in the game), leaving her final fate open to interpretation.

The characters of Vega and Altair are based on the central figures of the Japanese Tanabata star festival.

==== Hollow ====
Voiced by: Isshin Chiba

Hollow (Empty (エンプティー, Enputī) in the Japanese Version) is Vega's imposing, soft-spoken assistant. His name comes from the fact that he seems almost like an empty shell, with no host. In battle, he attacks by using the four elements and by summoning viruses. Hollow is actually an EM version of Altair (Hiko in the Japanese version), Vega's dead lover. After his death, Vega created a Matter Wave simulacrum of his soul, and placed it inside of a shell body. Hollow, however, had neither the memories nor personality of Altair. Nevertheless, he served Vega faithfully, often acting as a bodyguard, which led to his death when he tried to shield her from Le Mu's power. His final wish was to allow Vega to speak with Altair one last time.

In the anime an electrical generator provides him with limitless power, effectively making him invulnerable. In his initial fight in the anime he easily beat Dark Phantom and Yeti Blizzard, then when he turned on Mega Man under Vega's orders not even Berserk Sword's power (with which Mega Man seemed invincible in all his earlier battles) could stop him. The only downside to this was that his range was greatly limited, and he would be rendered vulnerable if the generator was damaged or destroyed, this likely being the reason Vega had Mega Man collect the OOparts, since Hollow was limited to where the generator was, but when given the OOparts he took from Dark Phantom and Yeti Blizzard he overcame this weakness. Eventually when Geo gained all three OOPArts, Hollow was utterly and epically destroyed by Mega Man's Tribe King form, despite his immense power. Vega does get teary-eyed after witnessing Hollow's destruction, implying that there was a deeper connection between the two.

The characters of Vega and Altair are based on the central figures of the Japanese Tanabata star festival.

==== Mu EM Body Users ====
Hyde and Phantom
Hyde Voiced by: Hiroshi Masamoto
Phantom Voiced by: Katsumi Suzuki
Hyde (ハイド, Haido) and Phantom (ファントム, Fantomu) are antagonists introduced during the events of the second game. Hyde can EM Wave Change with the UMA Phantom. In this form, he is referred to as Dark Phantom (Phantom Black (ファントム・ブラック, Fantomu Burakku) in the Japanese Version), and resembles Erik from The Phantom of the Opera. He crosses paths with Geo several times throughout the course of the game, performing tasks such as kidnapping and distributing UMAs, until he is tossed aside by Vega. He makes a reappearance in Mega Man Star Force 3, working on his own. Again, he tries to play things by a 'script', and attempts to steal the Ace/Joker Program from Geo in an attempt to control the noise himself and gain more power. After his second defeat, he seemingly falls to his death, but Mega Man was sure that he would return. In the anime, Hyde is a painter, yet his works are not very popular due to their macabre nature, leading him to wish for immortality so that he can live to see the time when his works are recognized. The mischievous UMA Phantom, known as Ghost (ゴースト, Gōsuto) in the anime, appears outside his window one day, encouraging him to search for the OOPArts, saying that they will grant him the immortality he seeks. After tangling with both Mega Man and Yeti Blizzard, he manages to steal the Ninja OOPArt. Vega bribes both him and rival Yeti Blizzard into accompanying her to Mu, yet the two escape when the tables begin to turn in Mega Man's favor. He is currently at large. In the anime, Hyde generally depicted as a comical incompetent fool.
Rich Dotcom and Yeti
Rich Dotcom Voiced by: Masaki Aizawa
Yeti Voiced by: Yuuto Kazama
Rich Dotcom, known as Monjirō Gori (五里 門次郎, Gori Monjirō) in the original Japanese version, and Yeti (イエティ, Ieti) are antagonists introduced during the events of the second game. Rich is a mafia boss and is often seen with a veritable army of female assistants. He can EM Wave Change with the UMA Yeti and become Yeti Blizzard (イエティ・ブリザード, Ieti Burizādo), a wave being that resembles the Abominable Snowman. In the game, he tries to buy the Grizzly Peak resort, and when that fails, he sabotages the mountain's weather system in an attempt to drive its visitors away. In the anime, Rich first appears in an attack on a museum to steal the Sword of Berserk as Yeti Blizzard, but loses his prize to Mega Man. He is not above bribing or threatening people in order to get what he wants, though Yeti often admonishes him for not using his brain enough. The pair eventually do manage to steal the Saurian OOPArt from the Dombler Lake after manipulating Plesio Surf into distracting Mega Man and Lyra Note. Vega bribes both him and rival Dark Phantom into accompanying her to Mu, yet the two escape when the tables begin to turn in Mega Man's favor. He is currently at large.
Gerry Romero and Plesio
Gerry Romero Voiced by: Koichi Toochika
Brachio Voiced by: Kinryu Arimoto
Gerry Romero and Plesio, known as Kyū Demegawa and Brachio in the original Japanese version, are two characters introduced during the events of the second game. Romero is the director and host of "World Mysteries", a Netopian television station and greedily accepts the Plesiosaurus UMA Plesio from Hyde. His wave form is called Brachio Wave in the Japanese version (there is an inconsistency in his English name; see below paragraph). He poses as a monster living in Loch Mess (Dombler Lake in the Japanese version), nicknamed Messie (Dossy in Japan; both names are a play on the Loch Ness monster who is often nicknamed "Nessie"). He does this to boost his station's ratings, but Mega Man puts an end to his deception. In the U.S. release, there is a localization inconsistency regarding the name of Kyū/Gerry's wave form. In the dialog, when he first appears in EM Wave form, he refers to himself as "Plesio Wave", but the actual boss is identified during the battle as Plesio "Surf" (in its usual CamelCase abbreviated form), which is also reflected in the relevant battle cards for the character (later dialog uses the "Plesio Surf" name). In the anime, Romero is head of CMM's Mystery Investigators, sent to investigate reported Messie sightings at Loch Mess. The skeptical reporter is taken over by Plesio, the real Messie, so that he can put an end to development on the lake's shores. Plesio reveals to Sonia and Geo that his attacks are not malicious; he merely wants the lake to be peaceful again. After Rich Dotcom manages to steal the Saurian OOPArt from the lake bottom, Plesio bids farewell to the two, content that the activity will die down. Romero, now convinced of Messie's existence, departs with his crew to investigate other mysteries around the world. In the anime, Romero does not seem to be evil, unlike in the game.
Chief Osa Agame and Condor
Chief Osa Agame Voiced by: Katsuhisa Houki
Condor Voiced by: Takeharu Oonishi
Nansuka Village Chief Osa Agame (referred to as simply the "Shaman" in the U.S. release) and Condor are two characters introduced during the events of the second game. Chief Osa Agame is the leader of Nansuka Village (pronounced "Nan-ska", a reference to the Nazca Lines, and a shortening of the Japanese "nani desu ka," meaning "what is it,"), in which the people greet each other by saying "Nansuka". In the U.S. release, both the greeting and the location are renamed "Whazzap", obscuring references to the aforementioned Nazca Lines (including a section of the village named the "Nansuka Lines"; this was renamed the "Whazzap Lines") but retaining the dynamics of the "Nanska!" greeting used by the natives ("What is it?" can be loosely translated as "What's going on?" or "What's up?"). Additionally, "Whazzap" is portrayed as a country as opposed the merely being a tribal village originally. Agame accepts Condor from Hyde, believing him to be some kind of deity. His wave form, called Terra Condor (Condor Geograph in the Japanese version), believes Bud Bison is his village's god. He kidnaps Bud, Luna and Zack, but is defeated by Mega Man. In the anime, Agame cares deeply about his village and admires its flowers most of all. However, during a ceremony he is possessed by Condor. As Terra Condor he believes himself to be a god and terrorizes his village. In the end Agame is reminded of his love of flowers, distracting Condor long enough for Mega Man to use the Berserk Sword to land a killing blow and delete the UMA. In the aftermath, he comes to believe that Mega Man is in fact Whazzap's god. His Japanese voice actor is Katsuhisa Houki and Condor's Japanese voice actor is Takeharu Oonishi.

==== Dealer ====
Mr. King
Mr. King is the head of Dealer, and the main antagonist of the third installment. He is famous as a genius scientist, and his public persona is that of the head of the King Foundation. In the final battle, he fuses with Meteor G to make the Crimson Dragon.
Heartless
Heartless functions as Mr. King's right hand lady. Heartless is revealed to be a spy who originally headed the Dealer organization that made it possible to send Kelvin into space. Aside from trying to overthrow King, she had also been attempting to make contact with Kelvin who was trapped inside Meteor G. She is also an old friend of Geo's mother. It is also implied that "Heartless" is not her real name as Geo's mother reveals that "Heartless" is one of many names she uses.
Queen Tia and Virgo
Queen Tia is part of an organization called Dealer. The FM-ian Virgo (ヴァルゴ, Varugo), along with Corvus, is the most wanted criminal on Planet FM. The two can perform Wave Change to form Queen Virgo (クイーンヴァルゴ, Kuīn Varugo), who is capable of using aquatic attacks such as summoning a dragon made of water. She enters the story by posing as a new teacher at Echo Elementary. It's later revealed that she used to have a relationship with A.C. Eos while he was a member of Dealer. She and her younger brother were both orphaned in a war sparked over technological advances. As a consequence, the two wish to use Meteor G to destroy the world's technology. Within the Meteor Server, Geo is able to talk them out of revenge, prompting their FM-ian partners to turn on their hosts, but they are deleted by Rogue and the siblings are saved. Queen Tia is later seen by the hospitalized A.C.'s side thus getting back with him. A Noise Change is available with Virgo.
Jack and Corvus
Jack (ジャック, Jakku) is the younger brother of Queen Tia who also works for Dealer. The FM-ian Corvus is, along with Virgo, the most wanted criminal on Planet FM. He also has something of an axe to grind with Omega-Xis. The two can perform Wave Change to form Jack Corvus, a fire-elemental being who can attack from the skies. He enters the story as a new transfer student at Echo Elementary, filling up Pat Sprigs's empty seat in 5-A. He is mostly emotionless around others, his sister being the only one he can open up to, though he does show a highly aggressive side as well. He and his older sister were both orphaned in a war sparked over technological advances. As a consequence, he and his sister wish to use Meteor G's power to destroy the world's technology. Within the Meteor Server, Geo is able to talk them out of revenge, prompting their FM-ian partners to turn on their hosts, but they are deleted by Rogue and the siblings are saved. Jack is later seen celebrating the destruction of Meteor G with his classmates, having finally been able to open up to people. A Noise Change is available with Corvus.
Joker
Joker is another member of Dealer. He is able to Wave Change to form Dread Joker, a powerful EM being who fights with brute strength. Joker is not actually a human being, but rather Mr. King's wizard, the self-proclaimed "most powerful Battle Wizard ever created". He draws upon Meteor G itself to achieve his finalized form.

== Manga ==
Cover art for the first tankōbon of the manga produced by Masaya Itagaki

The Ryūsei no Rockman manga began running in CoroCoro Comic in November 2006. The manga differs vastly from the video-game and anime iterations of the franchise, although the premise is set up similarly. Geo is grieving the disappearance of his father and questioning the unusual partnership he has gained with the "FM-ian" Omega-Xis. By combining their powers, they are able to transform into the EM Wave Human named Mega Man and battle crime. Geo soon learns of the Wave Coliseum, a tournament that awards the champion a power known as Star Force. Geo believes this power will allow him to travel to space and find his father, so he enters the tournament. However, complications occur when one of the competitors, Gemini Spark, steals the Star Force in order to revive Andromeda, the king of the FM-ians. This story arc concludes with Mega Man discovering that Andromeda and his father Kelvin had fused as a single EM Wave Human. Defeating Andromeda, Kelvin is freed and returns to Earth to live with his family and new FM-ian friends.

From chapter 17 and on the story shifts to focus on characters and concepts from the second video-game. However, Geo and Omega-Xis are completely absent. Instead, the three Tribe-On transformations from the second video-game—Thunder Zerker, Fire Saurian, and Green Ninja—are personified as entities of their own. In the past, their tribe was ravaged by a warrior named Rogue. Having grown up, Zerker has taken on the task of invading the continent Mu and hunting down Rogue for revenge. But in order to reach Rogue, Zerker must first traverse an eight-story tower and battle Rogue's underlings every step of the way, including Saurian and Ninja who are under the influence of Mu.

Another manga was also serialized in CoroCoro Comic by Kawano Takumi called Shōgeki On Air!! Ryūsei no Rockmen (笑劇オンエア!!流星のロックメ～ン, Shōgeki On Ea!! Ryūsei no Rokkumen; Farce On Air!! Shooting Star Rockman), a light-hearted story that appears to focus on two separate Mega Men.

In order to promote the third installment of the video-game series, Ryo Takamisaki (author of the MegaMan NT Warrior manga) produced a new manga series to run in CoroCoro Comic as of November 2008. Entitled simply Ryūsei no Rockman 3 (流星のロックマン3, Ryūsei no Rokkuman Surī; Shooting Star Rockman 3), this manga does not reference the previous works by Itagaki and more closely follows the concepts and premises defined by the video-game franchise. The manga introduces A. C. Eos and his Wizard Acid, as well as battles with a Noise-corrupted Spade Magnes and Jack Corvus.

As of the January 2009 issue of CoroCoro Comic, the manga has concluded after only two chapters for unknown reasons. As two chapters is not enough to fill a single tankōbon, it's doubtful Takamisaki's version will receive a separate release unless it is picked back up for serialization in the future.

=== Releases ===
Manga by Masaya Itagaki

No.	Release date	ISBN
1	2007-03-28	978-4-09-140322-3
01. "Kono Nagareboshi Ha Moshiya…!?" (この流れ星はもしや…!?, Kono Nagareboshi Ha Moshiya…!?; Perhaps This Shooting Star…!?); 02. "Denpaka Shiteiru Rockman de Hayaku mo Tōsan ni Saikai…!?" (電波化しているロックマンで早くも父さんに再会…!?, Denpaka Shiteiru Rokkuman de Hayaku mo Tōsan ni Saikai…!?; A Reunion Between Wave Changed Rockman and Father Already…!?); 03. "Saranaru Nankan ga Tachihadakaru…!?" (さらなる難関が立ちはだかる…!?, Saranaru Nankan ga Tachihadakaru…!?; Yet Another Barrier Blocks the Way…!?); 04. "Ox no Kangae towa…!?" (オックスの考えとは…!?, Okkusu no Kangae towa…!?; Ox's Intentions…!?); 05. "Gemini tono Taiketsu wa…!?" (ジェミニとの対決は…!?, Jemini tono Taiketsu wa…!?; Showdown with Gemini…!?)
2	2007-10-26	978-4-09-140390-2
3	2008-03-28	978-4-09-140498-5
TRIBE	2008-08-28	978-4-09-140666-8

Manga by Kawano Takumi

No.	Release date	ISBN
1	2008-08-28	978-4-09-140667-5
