= Highschool of the Dead =

Japanese media franchise

- First tankōbon volume cover, featuring Rei Miyamoto

学園黙示録 HIGHSCHOOL OF THE DEAD (Gakuen Mokushiroku Haisukūru obu za Deddo)
- Genre: Action; Horror; Supernatural thriller
- Manga
- Written by: Daisuke Satō
- Illustrated by: Shōji Satō
- Published by: Fujimi Shobo
- English publisher: NA: Yen Press
- Imprint: Kadokawa Comics Dragon Jr.; Dragon Comics Age
- Magazine: Monthly Dragon Age
- English magazine: NA: Yen Plus (color)
- Original run: August 9, 2006 – April 9, 2013
- Volumes: 7
- Anime television series
- Directed by: Tetsurō Araki
- Produced by: Mitsutoshi Ogura
- Written by: Yōsuke Kuroda
- Music by: Takafumi Wada
- Studio: Madhouse
- Licensed by: AUS: Madman Entertainment; NA: Sentai Filmworks; UK: Manga Entertainment
- Original network: AT-X, tvk, Tokyo MX, Chiba TV, KBS, TVA, TVS, SUN
- English network: AU: C31; NA: Anime Network, Neon Alley
- Original run: July 5, 2010 – September 20, 2010
- Episodes: 12 + OVA
- icon

Highschool of the Dead, known in Japan as Apocalyptic Academy: Highschool of the Dead (Japanese: 学園黙示録 HIGHSCHOOL OF THE DEAD, Hepburn: Gakuen Mokushiroku Haisukūru obu za Deddo), is a Japanese manga series written by Daisuke Satō and illustrated by Shōji Satō. It was serialized in Fujimi Shobo's Monthly Dragon Age between the September 2006 and May 2013 issues, but was left unfinished following Daisuke Satō's death in March 2017. Fujimi Shobo and Kadokawa Shoten published seven tankōbon volumes from March 2007 and April 2011 in Japan. Yen Press published the series in North America. The story follows a group of high school students caught in the middle of a zombie apocalypse.

A 12-episode anime adaptation, produced by Madhouse and covering the first four volumes, aired in Japan from July 5 to September 20, 2010. Madhouse also produced an original video animation (OVA) episode in 2011. Sentai Filmworks released an English dub of the anime series and OVA on DVD and Blu-ray in North America.

== Plot ==
Highschool of the Dead is set in present-day Japan, beginning as the world is struck by a deadly pandemic that turns humans into zombies, euphemistically referred to by the main characters as "Them" (奴ら, Yatsu-ra). The story follows a group of high school students and the school's nurse as they deal with the worldwide catastrophic event known as the "Outbreak". As the cast tries to survive the zombie apocalypse, they must also face the additional threats of societal collapse, in the form of dangerous fellow survivors, and the possible decay of their own moral codes. Starting from the high school, the students escape into town where they must deal with a corrupt teacher and his students. They check their homes for survivors, and pick up a little girl and a dog. Later, they hole up at a mall, travel through a police station, and eventually make their way to an elementary school that is supposedly a safe zone.

== Media ==
=== Manga ===
Written by Daisuke Satō and illustrated by Shōji Satō (no relation), Highschool of the Dead started in Fujimi Shobo's manga magazine Monthly Dragon Age on August 9, 2006. The manga went on hiatus from 2008 to 2010, but after March 2011, only one more chapter was released on April 9, 2013. The series was left unfinished following Daisuke Satō's death on March 22, 2017. Fujimi Shobo and Kadokawa Shoten published seven tankōbon volumes from March 1, 2007, and April 25, 2011, in Japan.

A full-color version of the manga, called Highschool of the Dead: Full-Color Edition (学園黙示録 HIGHSCHOOL OF THE DEAD FULL COLOR EDITION), began serialization in the February 2011 issue of Monthly Dragon Age. Kadokawa Shoten released the manga's seven volumes from February 25, 2011, to March 9, 2013. In North America, the full-color edition began serialization in the March 2011 issue of Yen Press' Yen Plus online magazine, and ran until the July 2011 issue. The volumes were later released in two hardcover omnibus volumes on November 22, 2011, and December 17, 2013.

Shortly following the inception of the series and before it was licensed for distribution in English, the manga became popular enough in English via scanlation to draw the attention of the creators, who included a message in English within the magazine's printing of the fifth chapter that requested readers to buy the original manga when it is available. The manga was later licensed in North America by Yen Press, and the first volume was released on January 25, 2011. The series is also published in Spain by Glénat España, in Germany by Carlsen, in Italy, Brazil, Mexico and Colombia by Panini Comics, in Canada and France for French-language publication by Pika Édition, in Poland by Waneko, and in Taiwan by Kadokawa Media.

A crossover manga by Shōji Satō, called Shōji Sato Artworks: Highschool of the Dead & Triage X – Lightning Pop (佐藤ショウジアートワークス 学園黙示録HIGHSCHOOL OF THE DEAD&トリアージX LIGHTNING POP, Satō Shōji Ātowākusu: Gakuen Mokushiroku Haisukūru obu za Deddo & Toriāji Ekkusu Raitoningu Poppu), was published on August 9, 2012, featuring characters from Triage X, Sato's other work.

The writer of the series, Daisuke Satō, became sick in 2008, which made the production of the manga very difficult. After his death in 2017, Kawanakajima and Shōji Satō agreed that the series should be stopped as is and instead focus on the Triage X series.

=== Anime ===
An anime adaptation aired on the Japanese network AT-X from July 5 to September 20, 2010, with subsequent broadcasts on TV Kanagawa, Tokyo MX, Chiba TV, KBS Kyoto, TV Aichi, TV Saitama, and Sun TV. Produced by Geneon Universal Entertainment, Showgate, AT-X and Madhouse, the series is directed by Tetsurō Araki, with Yōsuke Kuroda handling series composition, Masayoshi Tanaka designing the characters and Takafumi Wada composing the music. Six DVD and Blu-ray volumes were released by Geneon Universal Entertainment between September 22, 2010, and February 23, 2011.

In North America, the anime series was licensed by Sentai Filmworks for simulcast on the Anime Network. Some of the more graphic scenes were censored. In Australia and New Zealand, the series was licensed by Madman Entertainment. Sentai and Madman later gained additional rights to the series, with Section23 Films releasing the series with an English dub (produced by Seraphim Digital) on Blu-ray and DVD on June 28, 2011. Manga Entertainment also released the series in the United Kingdom. The English dub of the series aired on Anime Network's VOD service from March 10, 2011, to May 26, 2011, and was made available on Microsoft's Zune Marketplace and Apple's iTunes Store on May 27, 2011, and June 27, 2011, respectively.

An original video animation episode, titled "Drifters of the Dead", was bundled on Blu-ray with the limited edition release of the seventh volume of the manga on April 26, 2011. It was originally intended for a February release, but was pushed back. It was later licensed by Sentai Filmworks in North America for streaming, with the DVD and Blu-ray being released on November 26, 2013.

=== Music ===
The series' opening theme is "Highschool of the Dead" by Kishida Kyoudan & The Akeboshi Rockets. The series' closing theme songs differ in each episode, and each are sung by Maon Kurosaki. The CD single for the opening theme was released on August 18, 2010, by Geneon Universal Entertainment. The CD single features the TV and instrumental versions of "Highschool of the Dead" and a new song called "Ripple" (リプル, Ripuru), along with an instrumental version of the song. A CD containing all 12 ending themes sung by Kurosaki was released by Geneon on September 22, 2010, along with an original soundtrack.

=== Light novel ===
A light novel, called Highschool of the Dead: The Last Day (学園黙示録 HIGHSCHOOL OF THE DEAD〈終わり〉の日, Gakuen Mokushi HIGHSCHOOL OF THE DEAD Owari no Hi), was published in March 2011.

=== Video games ===
A pachislot machine-based video game, titled Slotter Mania V: Gakuen Mokushiroku Highschool of the Dead (スロッターマニアV 学園黙示録 HIGH SCHOOL OF THE DEAD), was released by Dorasu for the PS Vita on October 10, 2013.

A browser video game, titled Highschool of the Dead Day 0 (学園黙示録 HIGHSCHOOL OF THE DEAD DAY 0), was released by CTW Inc. on April 28, 2026.

Highschool of the Dead content has been featured in the video games Lollipop Chainsaw, Queen's Blade Limit Break and Taimanin RPG.

== Reception ==
In Japan, the sixth volume of Highschool of the Dead placed fifth on the Oricon charts between July 5 and July 11, 2010, selling 92,040 copies; and 13th between July 12 and July 18, 2010, selling 43,714 copies for a total of 135,754 copies. The seventh volume of Highschool of the Dead reached 11th on the Oricon charts between May 2 and May 8, 2011, selling 57,016 copies; second between May 9 and May 15, 2011, selling 115,154 copies; and 19th between May 16 and May 22, 2011, selling 34,362 copies for a total of 206,532 copies. By May 2011, the manga has had over 3 million copies in circulation.

In North America, the second volume of the manga reached The New York Times Best-Selling Manga List, placing fourth between April 24 and April 30, 2011; tenth between May 1 and May 7, 2011; and eighth between May 8 and May 14, 2011.

Andy Hanley of the UK Anime Network summaries the first manga volume as: "Nothing ground-breaking here, but a volume of mindless fun that brings all of the gory entertainment of a zombie apocalypse to the printed page." Nate Lanxon of Wired UK praises its production quality despite having no single original element.

At San Diego Comic-Con "Best and Worst Manga of 2011" panel, it was listed among the "Worst Manga" in a series of rapid-fire questions.

For the anime adaptation, Chris Beveridge from Mania.com comments on the first episode, "There's a lot to like here if you're looking for something beyond the usual high school dramas and comedies of the last few years." Carlo Santos of Anime News Network states that, "Other recent zombie works in Western entertainment have tried to play it ironic, or postmodernist, or just plain silly, but this one goes for straight-up horror—and pulls it off admirably." However, Zac Bertschy of the same website, states for this episode that, "It just could've easily been written by a script generator or a horror fan with 19 minutes to kill."

In March 2015, the Chinese Ministry of Culture announced a crackdown on sites hosting overly-violent or sexual anime content, with Highschool of the Dead being singled out as an example due to its sexual content; the Ministry described it as "borderline-pornographic". On June 12, 2015, the Chinese Ministry of Culture listed Highschool of the Dead among 38 anime and manga titles banned in China.
