= Triage X =

Japanese manga and anime series

- Cover of the 1st volume released in North America by Yen Press, featuring Mikoto Kiba

トリアージX (Toriāji Ikusu)
- Manga
- Written by: Shōji Satō
- Published by: Fujimi Shobo
- English publisher: NA: Yen Press
- Magazine: Monthly Dragon Age
- Original run: April 9, 2009 – present
- Volumes: 31 + 1
- Anime television series
- Directed by: Akio Takami; Takao Kato
- Produced by: Kenjiro Gomi
- Written by: Katsuhiko Takayama
- Music by: Makoto Miyazaki
- Studio: Xebec
- Licensed by: AUS: Madman Entertainment; NA: Sentai Filmworks; UK: Animatsu Entertainment
- Original network: Tokyo MX, Sun TV, TVQ, CTC, tvk, TV Saitama, GBS, MTV, BS11
- English network: NA: Anime Network
- Original run: April 8, 2015 – June 10, 2015
- Episodes: 10
- Original video animation
- Directed by: Akio Takami; Takao Kato
- Produced by: Kenjiro Gomi
- Written by: Katsuhiko Takayama
- Music by: Makoto Miyazaki
- Studio: Xebec
- Licensed by: AUS: Madman Entertainment; NA: Sentai Filmworks; UK: Animatsu Entertainment
- Released: November 2, 2015
- Runtime: 25 minutes
- icon

Triage X (トリアージX(イクス), Toriāji Ikusu) is a Japanese manga series written and illustrated by Shōji Satō. It has been serialized in Fujimi Shobo's shōnen manga magazine Monthly Dragon Age since 2009 and collected in 31 tankōbon volumes so far, as of June 2026. Yen Press publishes the manga in North America and has released 28 volumes as of August 26, 2025. There was also a Special volume released, entitled "Triage X Tribute" with little side stories about the Triage X main character cast drawn by friends and assistants of Shōji Satō to honor his work. A 10-episode anime television series adaptation by Xebec was broadcast on Tokyo MX from April 8, 2015, to June 10, 2015. An anime OVA episode was bundled in the release of the series' twelfth volume in November 2015.

In May 2015, Sentai Filmworks licensed Triage X for an English-language release in North America, though subtitled only. No official English dub exists while Animatsu Entertainment licensed the series for release in the United Kingdom.

== Plot ==
Behind the exterior of Mochizuki General Hospital resides the vigilante organization known as "Black Label". The team, made up of select hospital staff and local teenagers from nearby Mochizuki High School, task themselves with killing undesirable people, dubbed "cancers" of society, and to stop their spread of infection into society.

== Characters ==
Arashi Mikami (三神 嵐, Mikami Arashi)
Voiced by: Kenji Akabane
The main male protagonist. A handsome but socially awkward high school student that belongs to the Black Label Organization, a vigilante group that deals with criminals the police are unable to. When he was young, he was severely scarred on a terrorist attack that took the life of his best friend, Ryu Mochizuki and he received organ transplants from him. During missions, he wears a bullet-proof motorbike helmet that covers his entire face.
Mikoto Kiba (木場 美琴, Kiba Mikoto)
Voiced by: Yui Kondo
The main female protagonist. Arashi's partner and senior at high school. While at school she acts calm and proper, but can get short-tempered, especially towards Arashi. She has golden eyes, a lean body structure and a relatively large bust. She belonged to the Yakuza Kiba family, and her older brother Yuki tried to change it from the inside, which led him being killed on an arranged motorcycle accident, and she also got critically injured in the same accident. She was saved by the Mochizuki Hospital staff, which led her eventually joining the Black Label. She soon develops feelings for Arashi and she gets jealous when the other women or schoolgirls express their attraction toward him.
Oriha Nashida (梨田 織葉, Nashida Oriha)
Voiced by: Amina Satō
A 14-year-old middle schooler, idol and demolitions expert of the Black Label. She's a genius who started college when she was 11, but she can also be really childish and enjoys giving nicknames to her teammates. She lives at an abandoned mansion filled with explosive traps.
Sayo Hitsugi (柩 小夜, Hitsugi Sayo)
Voiced by: Ryōko Shiraishi
The main nurse at Mochizuki General Hospital. She's the close combat expert of Black Label, handling mini guns and light machine guns with ease. She's very curvy, also incredibly strong and has a good memory. While normally nice and laid-back, on a mission, she wears a devil mask and armored gauntlets and turns berserk, showing her more brutal and sadistic side. She also develops feelings for Arashi later on in the series.
Yuuko Sagiri (狭霧友子, Sagiri Yūko)
Voiced by: Fuyuka Oura
One of the head doctors at Mochizuki General Hospital. A kind and well-endowed woman, who is also a master swordsman. Whenever she wields her katana, her hair turns white, and it's so sharp it can cut through metal.
Miki Tsurugi (剣 光姫, Tsurugi Miki)
Voiced by: Masumi Asano
Anesthesiologist at Mochizuki General Hospital, Mikoto's mentor and Yuuko's childhood friend. She's the expert chemist and sniper of the Black Label, and tends to be the voice of reason in her team. She invented an anesthesia that works as a truth serum and the patient doesn't remember anything afterwards.
Masamune Mochizuki (望月正宗, Mochizuki Masamune)
Voiced by: Takaya Kuroda
The Chairman of Mochizuki General Hospital and founder of the Black Label organization. His son, Ryu Mochizuki, was Arashi's best friend, and after the terrorist attack, he was forced to declare his own son dead. He's now terminally ill and in a wheelchair.
Fiona Ran Winchester (フィオナ・蘭・ウインチェスター, Fiona Ran Winchesutaa)
Voiced by: Aya Hisakawa
The director of Mochizuki General Hospital and a member of the Black Label. She specializes in gathering information for missions.
Chikage Hizaki (緋崎 千影, Hizaki Chikage)
Voiced by: Ryouka Yuzuki
An assassin from a different organization, specializing in burning to death her targets. She befriends Mikoto (without either knowing the other works as a vigilante) when they become classmates. Her parents where killed in the same terrorist attack that scarred Arashi, and her younger sister died in a house fire that left her a severe burn scar.
Isoroku Tatara (多々良 五十六, Tatara Isoroku)
Voiced by: Hideaki Tezuka
A dedicated but easily angered detective who is constantly in pursuit of Black Label, even though he has been saved by them on two occasions.
Konomi Suzue (鈴江 このみ, Suzue Konomi)
Voiced by: Misato
A new detective in Tobioka Police Force and Tatara's partner, who is constantly dragged in his searches for Black Label. She's nearly as well endowed as Yuko.
Hinako Kominato (小湊 雛子, Kominato Hinako)
Voiced by: Naomi Ōzora
Arashi's classmate who develops a crush on him. She's unaware of her classmates activities as vigilantes. She works as a waitress at her father's café and is a big fan of Oriha.
Yuu Momokino (桃木野 由宇, Momokino Yuu)
Voiced by: Izumi Kitta
Hinako's best friend and Arashi's classmate. While at first she was weary of Arashi, after some time they become friends. She's also unaware of Black Label. She works several part-time jobs to maintain her younger brothers. She seems to develop some feelings for Mikoto later on.
Kaoru Murasaki (村咲 薫, Murasaki Kaoru)
Voiced by: Misa Kayama
A member of Syringe in charge of close quarters combat alongside her twin sister Kaori.
Kaori Murasaki (村咲 馨, Murasaki Kaori)
Voiced by: Kiyono Yasuno
A member of Syringe in charge of close quarters combat alongside her twin sister Kaoru. She's more serious and focused than her twin.
D
Voiced by: Setsuji Satō
A masked man in a balaclava.
Mr. Astro
Voiced by: Takanori Hoshino
A masked man who provides muscle for the group.
Kaname Makiishi (牧石 要, Makiishi Kaname)
Voiced by: Sayaka Nakaya
The leader of Syringe.
Kyōji Tobishiro (飛城 教示, Tobishiro Kyōji)
Voiced by: Kenji Nojima
The sadistic son of the head of the highly influential Tobishiro Clan, who is interested in acquiring the drug known as Platinum Lily.
Goryū (護龍)
Voiced by: Sachi Kokuryu
A sadomasochistic ninja woman who serves Tobishiro.
Shinichiro Inunaki (犬鳴 慎一郎, Inunaki Shinichirō)
Voiced by: Shin-ichiro Miki
A doctor from another organization and a former member of Black Label. He's the one who trained Arashi.
Haron Mikazuki (三日月 はろん, Mikazuki Haron)
Voiced by: Iori Nomizu
An idol and Sumire's older twin sister. She knows some karate moves.
Sumire Mikazuki (三日月 すみれ, Mikazuki Sumire)
Voiced by: Yumeha Kōda
An idol and Haron's younger twin sister. She's more endowed than Haron.

== Media ==
=== Manga ===
No.	Original release date	Original ISBN	English release date	English ISBN
1	December 8, 2009	978-4-04-712640-4	October 30, 2012	978-0-316-22547-2
2	September 7, 2010	978-4-04-712685-5	February 26, 2013	978-0-316-22938-8
3	September 7, 2011	978-4-04-712746-3	June 25, 2013	978-0-316-22939-5
4	March 7, 2012	978-4-04-712780-7	November 5, 2013	978-0-316-24317-9
5	August 7, 2012	978-4-04-712819-4	January 21, 2014	978-0-316-32233-1
6	February 7, 2013	978-4-04-712854-5	May 27, 2014	978-0-316-40737-3
7	August 9, 2013	978-4-04-712889-7	August 26, 2014	978-0-316-37683-9
8	February 8, 2014	978-4-04-070022-9	November 18, 2014	978-0-316-33652-9
9	September 9, 2014	978-4-04-070264-3	March 24, 2015	978-0-316-38375-2
10	March 9, 2015	978-4-04-070262-9	September 22, 2015	978-0-316-34874-4
11	May 9, 2015	978-4-04-070569-9	January 26, 2016	978-0-316-26894-3
12	November 9, 2015	978-4-04-070570-5	September 27, 2016	978-0-316-39915-9
13	May 9, 2016	978-4-04-070878-2	July 18, 2017	978-0-316-43967-1
14	November 9, 2016	978-4-04-072082-1	October 31, 2017	978-0-316-47481-8
15	May 9, 2017	978-4-04-072280-1	May 22, 2018	978-1-9753-2645-6
16	November 9, 2017	978-4-04-072494-2	October 30, 2018	978-1-9753-8113-4
17	June 9, 2018	978-4-04-072741-7	March 26, 2019	978-1-9753-0376-1
18	December 7, 2018	978-4-04-072975-6	August 20, 2019	978-1-9753-5823-5
19	June 8, 2019	978-4-04-073209-1	March 24, 2020	978-1-9753-9958-0
20	January 9, 2020	978-4-04-073465-1	October 6, 2020	978-1-9753-1587-0
21	July 9, 2020	978-4-04-073718-8	June 15, 2021	978-1-9753-2402-5
22	February 9, 2021	978-4-04-073986-1	March 15, 2022	978-1-9753-3816-9
23	August 6, 2021	978-4-04-074210-6	September 13, 2022	978-1-9753-4547-1
24	February 9, 2022	978-4-04-074429-2	January 17, 2023	978-1-9753-6000-9
25	August 9, 2022	978-4-04-074631-9	June 20, 2023	978-1-9753-6483-0
26	February 9, 2023	978-4-04-074865-8	October 17, 2023	978-1-9753-7369-6
27	October 6, 2023	978-4-04-075170-2	October 1, 2024	979-8-8554-0161-5
28	June 7, 2024	978-4-04-075481-9	September 9, 2025	979-8-8554-1540-7
29	February 7, 2025	978-4-04-075791-9	January 20, 2026	979-8-8554-2502-4
30	September 9, 2025	978-4-04-076091-9	November 24, 2026	979-8-8554-3851-2
31	June 9, 2026	978-4-04-076419-1	—	—

=== Anime ===
==== Episode list ====
No.	Title	Original air date
1	"Prescription of Hell"	April 8, 2015
Black Label is sent to kill the corrupt businessman Hideo Aranami and its newest member, Arashi Mikami is the intended executioner. Unexpectedly Arashi gives his target a gun to see if he will end his own life, only for Aranami to try shoot him. Realizing Aranami is beyond saving, Arashi kills him. At Black Label's hideout, Mikoto Kiba questions Arashi's actions while they shower and discovers that Arashi's body is covered with scars. Taisei Aranami, Hideo's equally corrupt son, alongside his accomplice Jin Masaki kidnap and torture a man and his daughter for trying to turn secret documents of the Aranami Company to the police, but they are interrupted by detective Isoroku Tatara. Black Label storms the building and Arashi kills Taisei. A gunfight occurs and Arashi ends up saving Tatara, but Masaki kills one of the hostages and escapes, while Oriha Nashida destroys the building with explosives. As Black Label leaves, Mikoto remembers how Arashi told her that his body was severely damaged during a terrorist attack and in order to save his life, Dr. Masamune Mochizuki, the founder of Black Label, transplanted organs from his own son and Arashi's best friend, Ryu Mochizuki (since he was brain dead from the incident) and he isn't sure how much of his body remains his. Meanwhile, Masaki swears revenge on the vigilantes, while another group prepares to go into action.
2	"Surgical Strike"	April 15, 2015
Detective Tatara tries to interrogate Mrs. Fujino (the rescued hostage), but Mochizuki General Hospital's staff frustrate his attempts. Dr. Mochizuki congratulates his agents and announces that Arashi, Mikoto and Oriha will become a team known as Ampule 1, supporting the Ampule 0 formed by Dr. Yuuko Sagiri, Dr. Miki Tsurugi and nurse Sayo Hitsugi. Masaki kidnaps Mrs. Fujino and his henchman Yoroida fatally runs over the elder Mrs. Kimura, one of Yuuko's patients, during the kidnapping. At an abandoned apartment complex, Masaki and his men await for the vigilantes while Masaki gives Fujino a drug known as Platinum Lily. When Tatara tries to save Fujino, the drugged woman stabs him, and when Mikoto tries to help him, Konomi Suzue, Tatara's partner enters the room, only to be taken hostage by Masaki's thugs. While Sayo, Miki and Yuko begin the assault, Arashi arrives just in time to save Mikoto, and Yuko avenges her patient by killing Yoroida. Arashi and Mikoto confront Masaki on the building's rooftop and when Fujino tries to attack him, Arashi knocks her out. Arashi tells Masaki that he always had a conscience, even with the surgery and that is what gives him strength. When Masaki tries to escape using a helicopter, Oriha (who had rescued an unconscious Tatara and Suzue) shots it down and Arashi kills Masaki. In the aftermath, Dr. Mochizuki tells his aid that they will continue with their triages, while the same mysterious group comment that they will eventually encounter Black Label.
3	"Midnight Guerrilla"	April 22, 2015
Mikoto remembers her brother's death while going on a mission, only to arrive and find out their target has been burned to death by another vigilante. Meanwhile former Black Label member Shiniichiro Inunaki gives Dr. Mochizuki a footage of Arashi's previous mission, that was recorded by Masaki before dying. Inunaki in exchange for his silence gives Black Label information about a new drug whose cargo will arrive very soon, and the consequences of its spreading. At school Mikoto meets the mysterious transfer student Chikage Hizaki, and the latter expresses her interest in Mikoto. Ampule 1 is sent to kill the leaders of the Kabuto Group, who are interested in acquiring the new drug. Despite successfully killing their targets, they encounter the arsonist once more before she escapes. Ampule 0 is sent to investigate on their own and Sayo follows Inunaki to the hideout of some arms dealers. While riding on her motorbike, Mikoto encounters Chikage. Meanwhile Kunio Oomichi, the brother of one of the killed members of the Kabuto plots his revenge. Sayo kills most of the dealers and before he can interrogate the surviving one, a sniper kills him, while Inunaki simply leaves. Mikoto tells Chikage how her brother died in a motorcycle accident and she also nearly died, so Chikage tells her how she lost both her parents at a terrorist incident, and how she and her sister were taken care of by a doctor, only for her sister to die in a house fire that scarred her. A drugged student tries to rape Arashi's classmate Yuu Momokino, but Chikage and Mikoto stop him in time. The drugged man escapes, but in his phone there's a ransom demand from Oomichi, who has taken another student hostage. Chikage (who happens to be the serial arsonist) and Mikoto part ways, in order to kill the remnants of the Kabuto.
4	"Fire Game"	April 29, 2015
Mikoto confronts Oomichi and finds herself surrounded by hostages strapped with explosive vests. Oomichi stabs Mikoto in a leg and forces her to "play a game" of escaping from the hostages within 10 minutes. Mikoto fails to reason with the hostages and when they try to kill her, she's saved by Chikage, who kills them since they used self-preservation as an excuse to hurt others. Chikage and Mikoto realize each other's identity and when Chikage tells her reasons to kill alongside her master, Mikoto suspects she's being manipulated. Oomichi sets the storage on fire and challenges the vigilantes to get him. Chikage tells Mikoto her feelings and leaves her behind, and before Mikoto collapses, Arashi arrives and gives her bike, urging his partner to finish this, while Oriha successfully deactivates the vests and saves the hostages. Before Chikage can kill Oomichi, Mikoto uses her bike to intercede and when Chikage tries to kill her, Mikoto yells how she cares about her and that is not too late. Oomichi tries to signal his snipers, but they have already being killed by Ampule 0, and he's then killed by Detective Makoto Ogawa, Chikage's master. Ogawa suddenly shoots Chikage in the eye since he considers her useless now. Arashi then throws his gun at Mikoto and she fatally shoots Ogawa, who before dying says that he considers Black Label's actions useless. Chikage regains consciousness and tells her friend that she hopes to reincarnate in a better world alongside her sister, before letting herself fall to the flames. Afterwards, Suzue shows Tatara that the Ogawa they knew was an impostor, and the veteran detective wonders how deep the secrets go. While Black Label wonders how Ogawa knew about them, Ogawa's allies begin to move.
5	"Sacrifice Idol"	May 6, 2015
Oriha and several other idols are invited to the inauguration of a new TV Station building. Oriha is set to perform alongside the idol twin sisters Haron and Sumire Mikazuki, but an armed group infiltrates the building. The terrorists, led by a man in a wolf mask, cut the electricity, lock the audience in a room, and take the idol hostages, but Oriha and the Mikazukis avoid being captured since Haron had to use the ladies room. Oriha notices something's wrong and after analyzing the situation in her dressing room, they are attacked by a man in disguise. The man inside the suit turns out to be drugged, but Oriha manages to knock him out. The man in the wolf mask, who calls himself Wild Hunt, tells on live TV that they're here (indirectly) to take revenge on Black Label and executes an idol in front of everyone. With every police officer in the city surrounding the building, Wild Hunt shows that the hostages are on a high floor and threatens to kill them by defenestration if they don't obtain their ransom, but in secret tells one of his henchmen that their objective has already been fulfilled. Oriha provokes a fire and using the sprinklers they avoid the cameras and reach the stairs, so she separates from the twins. Black Label is on hold and Arashi tells Mikoto they should trust Oriha, while she goes to see the body of her fellow idol.
6	"Galactic on Stage"	May 13, 2015
Before Wild Hunt can kill one of the hostages, Oriha distracts them and kills some henchmen using a homemade bomb. Oriha speaks to Wild Hunt using a radio and the terrorist reveals its knowledge of Black Label. Oriha fails to bargain with Wild Hunt and the police officers realize something's wrong with the blueprints. The man in charge of the security room turns out to be Wild Hunt's sub-commander and when Oriha manages to avoid him, he announces that the plan is in its final stage. The police storms the building and a gunfight happens, with Oriha being surprisingly saved from two gunmen by the Mikazuki sisters. Wild Hunt, who turns out to be a woman with a voice changer, knocks out Haron and Sumire and captures Oriha, but Ampule 1 springs into action. Wild Hunt and her men use secret tunnels that reach the subway to escape, but Mikoto and Arashi reach them in time. While Mikoto deals with the thugs, Arashi faces the sub-commander and Wild Hunt in total darkness. Wild Hunt, whose real name is Siren, directs his henchman by mimicking Oriha's voice, hoping to make Arashi panic. Arashi remains calm and by remembering Inunaki's lesson, kills the sub-commander and fatally shoots Siren. As she lays dying, Siren realizes Arashi is like them and says the world is about to change before dying. Oriha reunites with Haron and Sumire, while Mikoto and Arashi are ambushed by a masked rider.
7	"Chaos World"	May 20, 2015
The rider turns out to be Arashi's mentor, Inunaki, who was simply testing them. Inunaki also informs them that their suspicions about Siren's actions were right; she was distracting the police while her comrades stole from a cargo ship two briefcases necessary to manufacture the Platinum Lily. The ship belongs to Kyoji Tobishiro, from the influential Tobishiro Clan that rules the city from the shadows, but Inunaki mentions that Tobishiro doesn't truly understand what Platinum Lily really is. Ampule 0 goes to the ship and Sayo is attacked by the twin sisters Kaoru and Kaori Murasaki, while Yuko faces the masked Mr. Astro, who says that their group, Syringe, is declaring war to Black Label and their intentions to bring chaos to the world. The masked man D takes one of the briefcases, but Miki is able to obtain the other and Syringe makes the ship sink. Sayo is badly injured, but Yuuko finds her in time and taken to intense care. Dr. Mochizuki realizes he might know the contents of the briefcase and tells Arashi, Mikoto and Oriha what he knows. Masamune tells how he used to be the doctor of a mercenary group and in one of their missions they came across a village with access to an unknown virus, named D99 virus and its vaccine. The research team, formed by Masamune, his second-in-command Fiona Ran Winchester and Inunaki, discovered that the virus was capable of giving healing powers to those that survived it and its possibilities were limitless, but that the risks of falling in the wrong hands or mutating were too high, so they decided to destroy all the samples after the village was destroyed. It is then revealed that Arashi was the last person who received the virus, since Masamune didn't want to lose both him and his son. Arashi doesn't resent the doctor and Black Label wonders how it surfaced again. A frustrated Kyoji wants to spread the Platinum Lily as a way of spite his father, the Head of the Clan, meanwhile Sayo awakens.
8	"Closed Heart Shelter"	May 27, 2015
A Flashback on how Arashi was re-learning to walk and how Hitsugi helped him is shown. In the present Fiona directs Ampule 1 to capture Sayo, which confuses them, but Fiona explains that her illness has resurfaced and must be stopped. They run across a berserk Sayo and proves to be too much to handle, but Miki and Yuuko interfere in time. Yuuko is willing to kill Hitsugi, since she promised herself that she would do it if it came to it once more. Arashi prevents her from killing Sayo and locks himself and Hitsugi in an underground part of the facility. When Mikoto tries to intervene, Masamune convinces her to let Arashi try, since they have survived the same illness. Yuuko and Miki explain that 9 years ago they investigated a facility belonging to Itaru Togo, a member of the original team that researched the D99 virus, only to find everyone there including Togo dead, killed by a test subject. Miki found that the subject had developed a lot of strength and regeneration, but also deep psychological issues. Yuko was attacked by the subject, but right when she stabbed it, she realized it was Sayo. She saved her, but Sayo lost her memories. Arashi tries to make Hitsugi remember a promise they made each other years ago and finally succeeds when he takes off her mask. A grateful Sayo kisses Arashi in front of Mikoto, and then assures the rest of the team that she will no longer avoid her past. Meanwhile Kaname Makiishi, Syringe's leader, directs Kaoru and Kaori to kill a detective that's been researching them: Konomi Suzue.
9	"Limit Break"	June 3, 2015
Mikoto starts to develop feelings towards Arashi, but is unsure on how to act on them. Kaoru and Kaori attack Suzue, only for Tobishiro's thugs to kidnap her, barely managing to escape with the captive detective. Detective Hijiri, Black Label's contact on the police informs the situation, while Goryu, Tobishiro's second-in-command prepares to torture Suzue by showing her all the addicted girls that she has broken both in mind and body. She also mentions that she's reserving the Platinum Lily for later and how torture works for her. Fiona informs Dr. Mochizuki that Syringe was looking for information in the Public Safety's server, but their motives remain unknown. Black Label goes to Tobishiro's hideout at an abandoned mine, while Goryu taunts Suzue that Kyoji intends to play with her first, so she leaves to receive him. Oriha and Mikoto attract the guard's attention while Arashi looks for Suzue. Kaoru and Kaori also arrive, but they're confronted by a recovered Sayo, who proceeds to trash them around. When Kaori asks how she can be so strong, Sayo tells them that her father Itaru Togo used the D99 virus to save her from an incurable disease, and that she killed him when she snapped. The twins only say that they received their powers from a princess and before Hitsugi can kill them, Mr. Astro arrives and takes them away. Meanwhile Arashi finds and rescues Suzue, but accidentally releases all the girls that were infected with the Platinum Lily.
10	"How's the Water?" "Yu kagen ikaga?" (湯加減いかが?)	June 10, 2015
The girls relax at the bath and discuss their previous mission. Suzue is now on intensive care under the guarding eye of Tatara. Fiona mentions that she will recover and that there's no D99 in her system. Yuuko mentions that Syringe escaped from her, and blames Sayo for them getting away. Hitsugi apologizes for the trouble she's caused and a rivalry between Sayo and Mikoto for Arashi begins. Arashi finds himself resolved to keep fighting to protect those he cares. At school Arashi's classmates Yuu Momokino and Hinako Kominato talk about some mysterious kidnappings and how strange people also began to appearing, but Arashi knows the truth and warns them to be careful. Miki tries to get information from Inunaki, but Shinichiro only teases her and gives them a clue. Fiona and Masamune discuss the reappearance of the D99 virus and how it could endanger mankind. Mikoto and Arashi go after a drug dealer that's in a car chase with a woman hostage, and when they succeed in stopping him, they don't get new information on Syringe. While Mikoto takes the woman to the hospital, Arashi walks back home.
OVA	"Recollection XOXO"	November 2, 2015
