= Shōji Satō (artist) =

Japanese manga artist and illustrator

Shōji Satō 佐藤ショウジ
- Born: Ōita Prefecture
- Area: Manga artist
- Pseudonym: Inazuma

Shōji Satō (佐藤 ショウジ, Satō Shōji) is a Japanese manga artist and illustrator. He has also published various dōjinshi and ecchi under the pen name Inazuma and runs an erotic genre group called Digital Accel Works. He is responsible for the character design and illustration for the Highschool of the Dead manga. He is the former assistant of Kōshi Rikudō, the creator of the popular manga series Excel Saga.

== Works ==
- Futari Bocchi Densetsu, Shōnen Gahōsha, 2004
- Highschool of the Dead (学園黙示録 HIGHSCHOOL OF THE DEAD, Gakuen Mokushiroku), Fujimi Shobo, 2007 (illustrator, written by Daisuke Satō (no relation))
- Triage X (トリアージX), Fujimi Shobo, 2009
- FIRE FIRE FIRE (FIRE FIRE FIRE トリプルファイヤー), Shueisha, 2009
  - FIRE FIRE FIRE BLACK SWORD, Home-sha, 2013
- Divine Raiment Magical Girl Howling Moon (神装魔法少女ハウリングムーン, Shinsō Mahō Shōjo Howling Moon), Fujimi Shobo, 2018 (illustrator, written by Kenji Saito)
