= Daisuke Satō =

Japanese board game designer, novelist, and manga writer

- Born: April 3, 1964 Ishikawa, Japan
- Died: March 22, 2017 (aged 52)
- Area: Writer
- Pseudonym: Daisuke Tō
- Notable works: Imperial Guards; Highschool of the Dead

Daisuke Satō (佐藤 大輔, Satō Daisuke; April 3, 1964 – March 22, 2017) was a Japanese board game designer, novelist, manga and ecchi writer. He was known for his alternate history novels Seito and Red Sun Black Cross, among others. He wrote the story for his manga Imperial Guards (with illustrator Yū Itō) and Highschool of the Dead (with illustrator Shōji Satō). Imperial Guards was nominated for the Tezuka Osamu Cultural Prize in 2007 and for the first Manga Taishō in 2008. He died on March 22, 2017, from ischaemic heart disease. After Daisuke's death, the decision was made to leave Highschool of the Dead unfinished.

== Bibliography ==
=== Manga ===
- Nichi-Bei Kessen 2025日米決戦2025 (JA–US Final Battle in 2025) (as Daisuke Tō), illustrated by Yoshifumi Kobayashi
- Imperial Guards, illustrated by Yū Itō
- Highschool of the Dead (学園黙示録 HIGHSCHOOL OF THE DEAD, Gakuen Mokushiroku Highschool of the Dead), illustrated by Shōji Satō (no relation)

=== Games ===
- Red Sun Black Cross (レッドサン ブラッククロス)
- Return to Europe (リターン トゥ ヨーロッパ)
- Escort Fleet (エスコート フリート)
- Niitakayama Nobore (ニイタカヤマノボレ, Climb the New High Mountain)
- War in Vietnam (ベトナム戦争)

=== Novels ===
- Gyakuten Taiheiyou Senshi (逆転・太平洋戦史, Reversed Pacific War History)
- Nobunaga series (信長シリーズ)
- Seito (征途, Victory Road)
- Red Sun Black Cross
- Shinkou Sakusen Pacific Storm (侵攻作戦パシフィック・ストーム, Strike Operation Pacific Storm)
- Harukanaru Hoshi (遥かなる星, Distant Star)
- Tokyo no Yasashii Okite (東京の優しい掟, Gentle Rule of Tokyo)
- Kyoei no Okite (虚栄の掟, Vanity Rule)
- Chikyu-Renpou no Koubou (地球連邦の興亡, Rise and Fall of Federation, Earth)
- Koukoku no Shugosha (皇国の守護者, Imperial Guards)
- Ousatsu no Huckebein (鏖殺の凶鳥, Genocider Huckebein)
- Mokushi no Shima (黙示の島, Apocalyptic Island)
- Pyongyang Coup d'État Sakusen – Shizukanaru Asa no Tameni (平壌クーデター作戦 静かなる朝のために, Conspiracy of Coup d'État in Pyongyang – For the Peaceful Morning)
