= 2011 in anime =

The events of 2011 in anime.

== Year in review ==
Anime News Network's summarized the biggest events of the year in the industry as Aniplex's business plan. Theron Martin proposed this change in model to alienate fans and predicted that it could cause backlash for the company. Carl Kimlinger highlighted the 2011 Tōhoku earthquake and tsunami. The destruction caused by the earthquake and following tsunami disrupted and damaged a large portion of Japan, making it the most costly natural disaster in history. The Ishinomori Manga Museum was damaged and would re-open in late 2012, a year and a half after the disaster. Home video sales of anime DVDs in Japan between December 27, 2010, and June 26, 2011, were worth 19.6 billion yen, representing 18.8 percent of the DVD market; sales of Blu-ray discs in the same period were worth 17.1 billion yen, representing 57% of the Blu-ray disc market.

== Awards and praise ==
The Tokyo Anime Award for best movie was awarded to From Up on Poppy Hill; the award for best television series was given to Puella Magi Madoka Magica and Tiger & Bunny. The OVA award was given to Mobile Suit Gundam UC. Puella Magi Madoka Magica has won numerous awards in 2011, including the Japan Media Arts Festival Grand Prize in the Animation Division, the second television program to win that award.

At the Mainichi Film Awards, the Animation Film Award was won by Hotarubi no Mori e and the Ōfuji Noburō Award by 663114. From Up on Poppy Hill won the Japan Academy Prize for Animation of the Year. Internationally, Children Who Chase Lost Voices was nominated for the Asia Pacific Screen Award for Best Animated Feature Film.

According to Anime News Network's editor picks, the two series of the year were Angel Beats!, Bunny Drop with Hana-Saku Iroha, and Cross Game as runners-up. The two picks for movie of the year were Summer Wars and Evangelion: 2.22.

== Releases ==
=== Films ===
A list of anime films that debuted in theaters between 1 January and 31 December 2011.

Release date	English title	Duration	Japanese title	Director	Studio	Source
January 22	Broken Blade 5	47	Bureiku bureido shisen no Hate	Tetsuro Amino; Nobuyoshi Habara	Production I.G; Xebec	
January 29	Shouwa Monogatari	96	Showa Monogatari	Masahiro Murakami	Wao World	
February 26	Macross Frontier the Movie: The Wings of Goodbye	114	Gekijōban Macross F: Sayonara no Tsubasa	Shoji Kawamori	8bit; Satelight	
March 5	Bannō Yasai Ninninman (Note: Part of the Young Animator Training Project)	24	Bannō Yasai Ninninman	Masayuki Yoshihara	P.A. Works	
March 5	Doraemon: Nobita and the New Steel Troops—Winged Angels (Note: 3D Remake of the 1986 film Doraemon: Nobita and the Steel Troops)	108	Doraemon: Shin Nobita to Tetsujin Heidan - Habatake Tenshi-tachi	Yukiyo Teramoto	Shin-Ei Animation	
March 5	Kizuna Ichigeki (Note: Part of the Young Animator Training Project)	24	Kizuna Ichigeki	Mitsuru Hongo	Ascension	
March 5	O-jii-san no Lamp (Note: Part of the Young Animator Training Project)	24	O-jii-san no Lamp	Teiichi Takiguchi	TMS Entertainment	
March 5	Tansuwarashi (Note: Part of the Young Animator Training Project)	23	Tansuwarashi	Kazuchika Kise	Production I.G	
March 12	Gekijō-ban Anime Nintama Rantaro Ninjutsu Gakuen Zenin Shutsudō! no Dan	78	Gekijō-ban Anime Nintama Rantaro Ninjutsu Gakuen Zenin Shutsudō! no Dan	Masaya Fujimori	Ajia-do	
March 19	One Piece 3D: Strawhat Chase (Note: Part of a double feature with Toriko 3D: Kaimaku Gourmet Adventure!!)	30	One Piece 3D: Mugiwara Chase	Hiroyuki Satoh	Toei Animation	
March 19	Pretty Cure All Stars DX3: Deliver the Future! The Rainbow-Colored Flower That Connects the World	71	Precure All-Stars DX3 Mirai ni Todoke! Sekai o Tsunagu Niji-Iro no Hana	Takashi Otsuka	Toei Animation	
March 19	Toriko 3D: Kaimaku Gourmet Adventure!! (Note: Part of a double feature with One Piece 3D: Strawhat Chase)	40	Toriko 3D: Kaimaku Gourmet Adventure!!	Junji Shimizu	Toei Animation	
March 26	Broken Blade 6	52	Bureiku bureido dairokushō dōkoku no toride	Tetsuro Amino; Nobuyoshi Habara	Production I.G; Xebec	
March 26	Ghost in the Shell Stand Alone Complex - Solid State Society 3D (Note: 3D version of Ghost in the Shell: Stand Alone Complex - Solid State Society)	108	Kōkaku Kidōtai STAND ALONE COMPLEX Solid State Society	Kenji Kamiyama	Production I.G	
March 26	Xi AVANT	3	Xi AVANT	Kenji Kamiyama	Production I.G	
April 16	Detective Conan: Quarter of Silence	109	Meitantei Conan: Chinmoku no Quarter	Yasuichiro Yamamoto	TMS Entertainment	
April 16	Crayon Shin-chan: Fierceness That Invites Storm! Operation Golden Spy	108	Crayon Shin-chan: Arashi o Yobu Ōgon no Spy Daisakusen	Sōichi Masui	Shin-Ei Animation	
April 29	Legend of the Millennium Dragon	98	Onigamiden	Hirotsugu Kawasaki	Pierrot	
April 29	Tōfu Kozō	86	Tōfu Kozō	Gisaburō Sugii	Lapiz	
May 7	Children Who Chase Lost Voices	116	Hoshi o Ou Kodomo	Makoto Shinkai	CoMix Wave Films	
May 16	Muybridge's Strings	13	Muybridge no Ito	Koji Yamamura	Yamamura Animation, Inc.	
May 28	Buddha: The Great Departure	111	Tezuka Osamu no Buddha - Akai Sabaku yo! Utsukushiku	Kozo Morishita	Toei Animation	
June 4	Sengoku Basara - Samurai Kings: The Last Party	93	Sengoku Basara - The Last Party	Kazuya Nomura	Production I.G	
June 4	Treasure Hunting (Note: One of several short films that air at the Ghibli Museum)	9	Takara Sagashi		Studio Ghibli	
June 6	The Tibetan Dog	90	Tibet Inu Monogatari: Kin'iro no Dao Jie	Masayuki Kojima	Madhouse	
June 13	Appleseed XIII: Tartaros (Note: Compilation film)	84	Appleseed Sātīn ~Yuigon~	Takayuki Hamana	Jinnis Animation Studios; Production I.G	
June 18 – November 26	Towanoquon (Note: Series of six short films)	48	Towanoquon	Umanosuke Iida	Bones	
June 25	Heaven's Lost Property the Movie: The Angeloid of Clockwork	97	Sora no Otoshimono: Tokei-jikake no Angeloid	Hisashi Saito; Tetsuya Yanagisawa	AIC ASTA	
July 2	Fullmetal Alchemist: The Sacred Star of Milos	110	Fullmetal Alchemist: Milos no Sei-Naru Hoshi	Kazuya Murata	Bones	
July 2	Go! Anpanman: Rescue! Kokorin and the Star of Miracles	46	Soreike! Anpanman: Sukue! Kokorin to Kiseki no Hoshi	Hiroyuki Yano	Tokyo Movie	
July 16	From Up On Poppy Hill	95	Kokuriko-Zaka Kara	Goro Miyazaki	Studio Ghibli	
July 16	Pokémon the Movie: Black - Victini and Reshiram (Note: One of two versions of the fourteenth Pokemon film)	96	Gekijōban Pocket Monster Best Wishes! Victini to Shiroki Eiyū Reshiram	Kunihiko Yuyama	OLM, Inc.; Production I.G; Xebec	
July 16	Pokémon the Movie: White - Victini and Zekrom (Note: One of two versions of the fourteenth Pokemon film)	96	Gekijōban Pocket Monster Best Wishes! Victini to Kuroki Eiyū Zekrom	Kunihiko Yuyama	OLM, Inc.; Production I.G; Xebec	
July 26	Tekken: Blood Vengeance	92	Tekken Blood Vengeance	Yōichi Mōri	Digital Frontier	
July 30	Alice in the Country of Hearts: Wonderful Wonder World	84	Gekijō-ban Heart no Kuni no Alice - Wonderful Wonder World	Hideaki Oba	Asahi Production	
July 30	Naruto the Movie: Blood Prison	102	Gekijōban Naruto: Blood Prison	Masahiko Murata	Pierrot	
August 27	Hayate the Combat Butler! Heaven Is a Place on Earth	69	Hayate no Gotoku! Heaven Is a Place on Earth	Hideto Komori	Manglobe	
August 27	Magister Negi Magi: Anime Final	84	Mahō Sensei Negima! Anime Final	Akiyuki Simbo	Shaft	
September 3	Mardock Scramble: The Second Combustion	64	Marudukku Sukuranburu Nenshō	Susumu Kudo	GoHands	
September 3	The Prince of Tennis: Eikoku-shiki Teikyū-jō Kessen!	87	The Prince of Tennis: Eikoku-shiki Teikyū-jō Kessen!	Shunsuke Tada	M.S.C; Production I.G	
September 17	Hotarubi no Mori e	45	Hotarubi no Mori e	Takahiro Ōmori	Brain's Base	
October 1	The Princess and the Pilot	99	Toaru Hikūshi e no Tsuioku	Jun Shishido	Madhouse	
October 22	Hal's Flute (Note: Part of Yanase Takashi Theater)	48	Hal no Fue	Hiroshi Kawamata	TMS Entertainment	
October 24	Appleseed XIII: Ouranos (Note: Compilation film)	84	Appleseed Sātīn ~Yogen~	Takayuki Hamana	Jinnis Animation Studios; Production I.G	
October 29	Gyo	70	Gyo	Takayuki Hirao	ufotable	
October 29	Sakura no Ondo	21	Sakura no ondo	Hirao Takayuki	ufotable	
October 29	Suite PreCure: Take it back! The Miraculous Melody that Connects Hearts!	71	Eiga Suite Precure: Torimodose! Kokoro ga Tsunagu Kiseki no Melody	Yoko Ikeda	Toei Animation	
November 19	Scryed Alteration I Tao (Note: Compilation film)	96	Scryed Alteration Tao	Goro Taniguchi	Sunrise	
November 19	Un-Go episode:0 Inga chapter	48	Un-Go episode:0 Inga-ron	Seiji Mizushima	Bones	
December 1	One Piece 3D Gekisō! Trap Coaster	12	One Piece 3D Gekisō! Trap Coaster		Toei Animation	
December 3	K-On! Movie	110	K-On!	Naoko Yamada	Kyoto Animation	
December 17	Friends: Mononoke Shima no Naki	87	Friends: Mononoke Shima no Naki	Ryûichi Yagi; Takashi Yamazaki	Robot Communications; Shirogumi	
December 23	Inazuma Eleven GO: Kyūkyoku no Kizuna Griffon	90	Inazuma Eleven GO: Kyūkyoku no Kizuna Griffon	Yoshikazu Miyao	OLM, Inc.	

=== Television series ===
A list of anime television series released between 1 January and 31 December 2011.

Release date	English title	Eps	Japanese title	Director	Studio	Source
January 4 – March 29	Rio - Rainbow Gate!	13	Rio reinbō gēto!	Takao Kato	Xebec	
January 7– March 25	Wolverine	12	Uruvuarin	Hiroshi Aoyama; Rintaro	Madhouse	
January 7– April 1	Infinite Stratos	12	infinitto sutoratosu	Yasuhito Kikuchi	8-Bit	
January 7– April 8	Dream Eater Merry	13	Yumekui merī	Shigeyasu Yamauchi	J.C. Staff	
January 7– April 22	Puella Magi Madoka Magica	12	Mahō shōjo Madoka ★ magika	Yukihiro Miyamoto; Akiyuki Simbo	Shaft	
January 8 – April 7	Freezing	12	Furījingu	Takashi Watanabe	A.C.G.T	
January 8 – July 2	Gosick	24	Goshikku	Hitoshi Nanba	Bones	
January 8 – March 31, 2012	Cardfight!! Vanguard	65	Kādofaito!! Vuangādo	Hatsuki Tsuji	TMS Entertainment	
January 9 – February 27	Mitsudomoe Zouryouchuu!	8	Mitsudomo e zōryō-chū!	Masahiko Ōta	Bridge	
January 9 – March 27	I Don't Like My Big Brother At All!!	12	Onīchan no koto nanka zenzen suki janain dakara ne--!!	Keitaro Motonaga	ZEXCS	
January 9 – March 25, 2012	Beelzebub	60	Beelzebub	Yoshihiro Takamoto	Pierrot Plus	
January 11 – March 29	Dragon Crisis!	12	Doragon kuraishisu!	Hideki Tachibana	Studio Deen	
January 11 – March 30	Is This a Zombie?	12	Kore wa Zombie Desu ka?	Takaomi Kanasaki	Studio Deen	
January 11 – April 5	Level E	13	Reberu ī	Toshiyuki Kato	David Production; Pierrot	
January 12 – March 30	Kimi ni Todoke 2nd Season	12	Kimi ni Todoke 2nd Season	Hiro Kaburagi	Production I.G	
January 12 – April 6	DD Fist of the North Star	12	DD Hokuto no Ken	Kajio	North Stars Pictures	
January 14 – April 1	Fractale	11	Furakutaru	Yutaka Yamamoto	A-1 Pictures	
January 14 – April 1	Wandering Son	11	Hōrō musuko	Ei Aoki	AIC Classic	
February 6 – January 29, 2012	Suite Pretty Cure	48	Suīto purikyua ♪	Munehisa Sakai	Toei Animation	
March 2 – January 11, 2012	Little Battlers eXperience	44	Danbōru senki	Naohito Takahashi	OLM	
March 26 –	Shiawase Haitatsu Taneko		Shiawase haitatsu o mi kuji taneko		Kachidoki Studio	
April 1 – June 24	X-Men	12	Ekkusumen	Fuminori Kizaki	Madhouse	
April 2 – June 25	Dog Days	13	Doggu deizu	Keizō Kusakawa	Seven Arcs	
April 2 – March 31, 2012	Duel Masters Victory	52	Deyueru masutāzu bikutorī	Waruo Suzuki	Shogakukan Music & Digital Entertainment	
April 2 – March 31, 2012	Penguin no Mondai DX?	52	Pengin'no mondai DX?		Shogakukan Music & Digital Entertainment	
April 3 – September 18	Tiger & Bunny	25	TIGER & BUNNY (taigā Ando banī)	Keiichi Satō	Sunrise	
April 3 – September 25	Digimon Fusion	24	Dejimon kurosuu~ōzu ~ aku no desujeneraru to nanatsu no ōkoku ~	Tetsuya Endō	Toei Animation	
April 3 – September 25	Hanasaku Iroha - Blossoms for Tomorrow	26	Hanasaku iroha	Masahiro Andō	P.A. Works	
April 3 – September 25	Nichijou - My Ordinary Life	26	Nichijou	Tatsuya Ishihara	Kyoto Animation	
April 3 – October 4	Suzy's Zoo: A Day with Witzy	25	Sūjī's Zoo daisuki! Uittsuī	Hidekazu Ohara	Digital Media Lab	
April 3 – January 22, 2012	Bakugan Battle Brawlers: Gundalian Invaders	39	Bakugan batoru burōrāzu Gundalian Invaders	Mitsuo Hashimoto	TMS Entertainment	
April 3 – April 1, 2012	Beyblade: Metal Fury	52	Metaru faito beiburēdo 4D	Kunihisa Sugishima	SynergySP	
April 3 – March 30, 2014	Toriko	147	Toriko	Akifumi Zako; Hidehito Ueda	Toei Animation	
April 4 – June 20	We Without Wings - Under the Innocent Sky	12	Oretachi ni tsubasa hanai - under the inosento sky.	Shinji Ushiro	Nomad	
April 4 – June 26	Shouwa Monogatari	13	Shōwa monogatari TV	Hiroshi Kugimiya; Mitsuhiro Tougou	WAO World	
April 4 – June 27	Fireball Charming	13	Faiabōru chāmingu	Wataru Arakawa	Jinnis Animation Studios	
April 4 – June 27	Fujilog (Note: Its sequel, Fujilog 2, began airing in October of the same year.)	13	Fuji rogu	Shigeo Shichiji	Team Fujilog	
April 4 – March 26, 2012	Gintama'	51	Gintama'	Yōichi Fujita	Sunrise	
April 5 – June 21	Tono to Issho: Gantai no Yabō	12	Tono to issho gantai no yabō	Mankyū	Gathering	
April 5 – June 28	Battle Girls: Time Paradox	13	Sengoku otome ~ momoiro paradokkusu ~	Hideki Okamoto	TMS Entertainment	
April 6 – September 14	Steins;Gate	24	STEINS;GATE	Hiroshi Hamasaki; Takuya Satō; Tomoki Kobayashi	White Fox	
April 6 – September 28	Kaiji: Against All Rules	26	Gyakkyō burai kaiji hakai-roku-hen	Yūzō Satō	Madhouse	
April 6 – March 28, 2012	Spellbound! Magical Princess Lilpri	51	Hime chen! Oto gichikku aidoru rirupuri~tsu	Masatsugu Arakawa	Telecom Animation Film	
April 7 – June 23	A Thirty-Year Old's Health and Physical Education	12	30-Sai no hoken taiiku	Mankyū	Gathering	
April 7 – September 29	47 Todoufuken	26	47 Todō-fu inu		Pollyanna Graphics	
April 7 – January 26, 2012	Hyouge Mono	39	Heuge mono	Kōichi Mashimo	Bee Train	
April 7 – September 27, 2012	Sket Dance	77	Suketto dansu	Keiichiro Kawaguchi	Tatsunoko Production	
April 8 – June 24	A-Channel	12	A chan'neru	Manabu Ono	Studio Gokumi	
April 8 – June 24	Ghastly Prince Enma Burning Up	12	Dororon enma-kun me 〜 ra-me-ra	Yoshitomo Yonetani	Brain's Base	
April 8 – June 24	Maria†Holic Alive	12	Maria† horikku araibu	Akiyuki Simbo (Chief); Tomokazu Tokoro	Shaft	
April 8 – June 24	Softenni! the Animation	12	Sofutenitsu	Ryouki Kamitsubo	Xebec	
April 8 – July 1	HenSemi	13	Hen zemi	Takao Kato	Xebec	
April 8 – July 1	You're Being Summoned, Azazel	13	Yondemasu yo, Azazeru-san.	Tsutomu Mizushima	Production I.G	
April 9 – June 25	Sekai Ichi Hatsukoi - The World's Greatest First Love (Note: Its sequel, Sekai Ichi Hatsukoi 2, began airing in October of the same year.)	12	Sekaiichi hatsukoi TV	Chiaki Kon	Studio Deen	
April 9 – March 31, 2012	Jewelpet Sunshine	52	Juerupetto Sanshain	Takayuki Inagaki	Studio Comet	
April 9 – March 31, 2012	Pretty Rhythm Aurora Dream	51	Puritī rizumu ōrora dorīmu	Masakazu Hishida	Tatsunoko Production	
April 10 – June 12	Ring ni Kakero 1: Sekai Taikai-hen	6	Ringu ni kakero 1 sekai taikai-hen	Hiroshi Ikehata	Toei Animation	
April 11 – June 26	Astarotte's Toy	12	Asutarotte no omocha!	Fumitoshi Oizaki	Diomedéa	
April 11 – June 27	A Bridge to the Starry Skies	12	Hoshizora he kakaru hashi	Takenori Mihara	Doga Kobo	
April 11 – September 24, 2012	Yu-Gi-Oh! Zexal	73	Yu☆Gi☆Oh! Zexal	Satoshi Kuwabara	Gallop	
April 12 – June 28	The Qwaser of Stigmata II	12	Seikon no kueisā II	Hiraku Kaneko	Hoods Entertainment	
April 12 – June 28	The World God Only Knows II	12	Kami nomi zo shiru sekai II	Shigehito Takayanagi	Manglobe	
April 13 – June 22	Pū-Neko	11	Pu ~ neko		DLE	
April 13 – June 22	Weekly Shimakō	11	Shūkan shimakō	FROGMAN	DLE	
April 13 – September 14	Genki!! Ekoda-chan	22	Genki!! Ekota-chan	Benpineko	DLE	
April 13 – September 14	Honto ni Atta! Reibai-Sensei	22	Hontoni atta! Reibai sensei	Azuma Tani	DLE	
April 13 – September 14	Shiodome Cable TV	22	Shiodome kēburu terebi	FROGMAN	DLE	
April 15 – June 24	Anohana: The Flower We Saw That Day	11	Ano hi mita hana no namae o bokutachi wa mada shiranai.	Tatsuyuki Nagai	A-1 Pictures	
April 15 – June 24	[C] – The Money of Soul and Possibility Control	11	「C」 THE MONEY OF SOUL AND POSSIBILITY CONTROL	Kenji Nakamura	Tatsunoko Production	
April 15 – July 1	Aria the Scarlet Ammo	12	Hidan'no aria	Takashi Watanabe	J.C.Staff	
April 15 – July 1	Ground Control to Psychoelectric Girl	12	Denpa onna to seishun otoko	Akiyuki Simbo (Chief); Yukihiro Miyamoto	Shaft	
April 17 – July 3	Deadman Wonderland	12	Deddoman wandārando	Koichi Hatsumi	Manglobe	
April 17 – October 2	Blue Exorcist	25	Ao no futsumashi	Tensai Okamura	A-1 Pictures	
April 18 – March 29, 2013	Ohayou Ninja-tai Gatchaman	475	Ohayō ninja-tai gatchaman		Kate Arrow	
April 25 – May 6	Moshidora	10	Moshi dora	Takayuki Hamana	Production I.G	
May 4 – April 11, 2012	Inazuma Eleven GO	47	Inazuma irebun Go	Katsuhito Akiyama	OLM	
June 6 – March 28, 2014	Kayoe! Chugaku	425	Kayoe! Chū-gaku	Taketo Shinkai	DLE	
June 10 – July 22	Inumarudashi	4	Inumarudashi	Akitarou Daichi	Gathering	
June 29 – September 14	At that time Mr. Shimakoh moved!	11	Sonotoki, shimakō ga ugoita!	FROGMAN	DLE	
June 29 – September 14	Double-J	11	Daburu jiei	Azuma Tani	DLE	
July 1 – September 16	Blade	12	Bureido	Mitsuyuki Masuhara	Madhouse	
July 1 – September 23	Ro-Kyu-Bu ~ Fast Break!	12	Rō-kiyu-bu!	Keizō Kusakawa	Project No.9; Studio Blanc.	
July 1 – September 29	Monster Hunter Diary: Felyne Village on the Edge G	13	Monhan nikki girigiri airū-mura G	Benpineko; Koutarou Yamawaki	DLE	
July 2 – September 24	Heaven's Memo Pad	12	Kami sama no memo chō	Katsushi Sakurabi	J.C.Staff	
July 3 – September 16	Sacred Seven	12	Seikuriddo sebun	Yoshimitsu Ohashi	Sunrise	
July 3 – September 24	Uta no Prince Sama	13	Uta no ☆ purinsu sama~tsu♪ maji LOVE 1000-pāsento	Yuu Kou	A-1 Pictures	
July 3 – December 18	Nura: Rise of the Yokai Clan - Demon Capital	24	Nurarihyon no mago Sennen Makyou	Michio Fukuda	Studio Deen	
July 4 – September 19	Croisée in a Foreign Labyrinth The Animation	12	Ikoku meiro no kurowāze The Animation	Kenji Yasuda	Satelight	
July 5 – September 20	Twin Angel: Twinkle Paradise	12	Kaitō tenshi tsuin'enjeru 〜 kyunkyun ☆ tokimeki paradaisu!!〜	Yoshiaki Iwasaki	J.C.Staff	
July 5 – September 20	Yuruyuri: Happy Go Lily	12	Yuru Yuri	Masahiko Ōta	Doga Kobo	
July 5 – September 27	Natsume's Book of Friends Season 3	13	Natsume yūjinchō	Takahiro Ōmori	Brain's Base	
July 6 – September 21	Nyanpire The Animation	12	Niyanpaia The Animation	Takahiro Yoshimatsu	Gonzo	
July 6 – September 28	Kamisama Dolls	13	Kamisama dooruzu	Seiji Kishi	Brain's Base	
July 6 – September 28	Morita-san wa Mukuchi (Note: Its sequel, Morita-san wa Mukuchi 2, began airing in October of the same year)	13	Morita-san ha mukuchi.	Naotaka Hayashi	Seven	
July 8 – September 16	Bunny Drop	11	Usagi doroppu	Kanta Kamei	Production I.G	
July 8 – September 16	No. 6	11	NO. 6 [Nanbā shikkusu]	Kenji Nagasaki	Bones	
July 8 – September 30	Baka and Test - Summon the Beasts 2	13	Baka to tesuto to shōkanjū nitsu!	Shin Ōnuma	SILVER LINK.	
July 8 – September 30	Blood-C	12	Buraddo shī	Tsutomu Mizushima	Production I.G	
July 8 – September 30	Mayo Chiki!	13	Mayo chiki!	Keiichiro Kawaguchi	feel.	
July 8 – December 23	Penguindrum	24	Waru pingudoramu	Shōko Nakamura; Kunihiko Ikuhara	Brain's Base	
July 8 – December 23	The Idolmaster	25	Aidorumasutā	Atsushi Nishigori	A-1 Pictures	
July 9 – September 24	A Dark Rabbit Has Seven Lives	12	Itsuka tenma no kuro usagi	Takashi Yamamoto	Zexcs	
July 9 – September 24	The Everyday Tales of a Cat God	12	Nekogami yaoyorozu	Hiroaki Sakurai	AIC PLUS+	
July 10 – September 25	R-15	12	Aru jū-go	Munenori Nawa	AIC	
July 11 – September 26	Magic Breast Secret Sword Scroll	12	Manyū hikenchō	Hiraku Kaneko	Hoods Entertainment	
July 16 – October 1	The Mystic Archives of Dantalian	12	Dantarian no shoka	Yutaka Uemura	Gainax	
September 18 – September 2, 2012	Battle Spirits: Heroes	50	Batoru supirittsu haō (hīrōzu)	Akira Nishimori; Masaki Watanabe	Sunrise	
September 27 – December 25	The Squid Girl 2	12	Shinryaku!? Ikako	Tsutomu Mizushima (Chief); Yasutaka Yamamoto	Diomedéa	
October 1 – December 17	C³ - CubexCursedxCurious	12	Shīkyūbu	Shin Ōnuma	SILVER LINK.	
October 1 – December 24	Wagnaria!! 2	13	Wākingu'!!	Atsushi Ōtsuki	A-1 Pictures	
October 1 – March 24, 2012	Bakuman. 2	25	Bakuman. 2Nd shīzun	Kenichi Kasai; Noriaki Akitaya	J.C.Staff	
October 2 – December 18	Majikoi: Oh! Samurai Girls	12	Shinkende watashi ni koishi nasai!	Keitaro Motonaga	Lerche	
October 2 – December 25	Fate/Zero	13	Feito/zero	Ei Aoki	ufotable	
October 2 – December 25	Horizon in the Middle of Nowhere	13	Kyōkaisenjō no horaizon	Manabu Ono	Sunrise	
October 2 – December 26	Fujilog 2nd Season	13	Fujirogu dai 2 shīzun	Shigeo Shichiji	uzupiyo Animation & Digital Works	
October 2 – March 25, 2012	Digimon Fusion	25	Dejimon kurosuu~ōzu-ji o kakeru shōnen hantā-tachi	Yukio Kaizawa	Toei Animation	
October 2 – April 1, 2012	Phi-Brain - Puzzle of God	25	Fai burein-shin no pazuru	Junichi Satō	Sunrise	
October 2 – September 30, 2012	B-Daman Crossfire	52	Kurosufaito bīdaman	Yoshinori Odaka	SynergySP	
October 2 – September 24, 2014	Hunter × Hunter	148	HUNTER×HUNTER (hantā × hantā)	Hiroshi Koujina	Madhouse	
October 3 – December 19	Tamayura - Hitotose	12	Tamayura ~ hitotose ~	Junichi Satō	TYO Animations	
October 4 – December 27	You and Me.	13	Kimi to boku	Mamoru Kanbe	J.C.Staff	
October 4 – March 27, 2012	Sengoku Paradise Kiwami	26	Sengoku ☆ paradaisu - kyoku - (kiwami)	Katsuya Kikuchi	LMD; Milky Cartoon	
October 5 – December 21	Maken-Ki!	12	Makenki~tsu	Kōichi Ōhata	AIC Spirits	
October 5 – December 21	Mashiroiro Symphony: The Color of Lovers	12	Mashiro iro shinfonī - The karā of lovers -	Eiji Suganuma	Manglobe	
October 5 – December 28	Morita-san wa Mukuchi. 2	13	Morita-san ha mukuchi. 2		Seven	
October 5 – March 28, 2012	Chihayafuru	25	Chihayafuru	Morio Asaka	Madhouse	
October 7 – December 23	Haganai: I don't have many friends	12	Boku ha tomodachi ga sukunai	Hisashi Saito	AIC Build	
October 7 – March 30, 2012	Persona 4 The Animation	25	Perusona 4 animēshon	Seiji Kishi	AIC ASTA	
October 8 – December 24	Sekai Ichi Hatsukoi - World's Greatest First Love 2	12	Sekai hatsukoi 2	Chiaki Kon	Studio Deen	
October 8 – March 24, 2012	Shakugan no Shana: Season III	24	Shakugan no shana III – Final –	Takashi Watanabe	J.C.Staff	
October 9 – December 25	Ben-To	12	Ben tō	Shin Itagaki	David Production	
October 9 – April 15, 2012	The Future Diary	26	Mirai Nikki	Naoto Hosoda	asread.	
October 9 – September 23, 2012	Mobile Suit Gundam AGE	49	Kidō senshi Gandamu AGE	Susumu Yamaguchi	Sunrise	
October 10 – February 17, 2014	Chibi Devi!	75	Chibi ☆ debi!	Maki Kamitani	SynergySP	
October 13 – December 29	gdgd Fairies	12	Gdgd yōseis (gudaguda fearīzu)	Souta Sugahara	Bouncy	
October 14 – December 23	Un-Go	11	An-go	Seiji Mizushima	Bones	
October 14 – March 23, 2012	Guilty Crown	22	Giruti kuraun	Tetsuro Araki	Production I.G	
October 15 – March 24, 2012	Last Exile: Fam, the Silver Wing	21	Rasuto eguzairu - gin'yoku no famu -	Koichi Chigira	Gonzo	
October 26 – March 14, 2012	Tobidase! Dokan-kun	15	Tobidase! Dokan-kun		DLE	
November 28 – January 30, 2012	High Score	8	Hai sukoa	Hajime Kurihara	DLE	

=== OVAs, ONAs, and Specials ===
A list of original video animations (OVAs), original net animations (ONAs), original animation DVDs (OADs), and specials released between 1 January and 31 December 2011. Titles listed are named after their series if their associated OVA, special, etc. was not named separately.

Release date	English title	Eps	Japanese title	Type	Director	Studio	Source
January 5	Kimi ni Todoke: From Me to You - Unrequited Love	1	Kimi ni todoke: kataomoi	Special	Hiro Kaburagi	Production I.G	
January 7 – March 24, 2013	Otona Joshi no Anime Time	4	Otona joshi no anime taimu	Special	Hiroshi Kawamata	Bones; Production Reed; The Answer Studio; WAO World	
January 8	Armored Trooper Votoms: Alone Again	1	Sōkō kihei botomuzu koei futatabi	OVA	Kazuyoshi Takeuchi (chief); Ryousuke Takahashi	Sunrise	
January 21	Golden Kids	2	Gōruden ★ kizzu	ONA	Takayuki Hamana	Shirogumi Inc.	
January 22	Five Numbers!	1	Norageki!	OVA	Hiroaki Ando	Sunrise	
January 26	A Certain Magical Index II: Specials	2	Toaru majutsu no indekkusu tan	Special		J.C.Staff	
January 27 – February 24	T.P. Sakura: Time Paladin Sakura	2	T. P. Sakura 〜 taimu paradin sakura 〜 jikūju bōei-sen	OVA	Takehiro Nakayama	Nomad	
January 28 – April 7	.hack//Quantum	3	.hack//Quantum	OVA	Masaki Tachibana	Kinema Citrus	
January 28 – April 7	.hack//Quantum: Go, Our Chim Chims!!	3	.Hakku// kantamu eizō tokuten sore ike! Boku-ra no chimuchimu-chan!!	Special		Kinema Citrus	
January 28 – April 22	Princess Jellyfish Specials	4	Kurage Hime Hideo retsuden ☆	Special		Brain's Base	
February 1	Wish Upon the Pleiades	4	Hōkago no pureadesu	ONA	Shouji Saeki	Gainax	
February 2	Shin Koihime†Musou: Otome Tairan - Gakuensai da yo! Zenin Shuugou no Koto	1	Ma kohime† musō ~ otome tairan ~ gakuen-saida yo! Zen'in shūgō no koto	OVA	Nobuaki Nakanishi	Doga Kobo	
February 2	The Garden of Sinners Chapter 8: Epilogue	1	Gekijō-ban sora no kyōkai the Garden of sinners shūshō	Special	Hikaru Kondo	ufotable	
February 3	Pokemon Diamond & Pearl Specials	2	Pocket Monsters: Diamond & Pearl Tokubetsuhen	Special		OLM	
February 20	Mai no Mahou to Katei no Hi	1	Mai no mahō to katei no hi	Special	Masayuki Yoshihara	P.A. Works	
February 22 – May 31	OreImo Specials	4	Ore no imōto ga kon'nani kawaii wake ga nai	ONA		AIC Build	
February 23	Fortune Arterial: Akai Yakusoku - Tadoritsuita Basho	1	Fōchun'ateriaru akai yakusoku tadoritsuita basho	OVA		Feel; ZEXCS	
February 23	Mitsudomoe: Oppai Ippai Mama Genki	1	Mitsudomo e OPPAI IPPAI mama genki	Special	Masahiko Ōta	Bridge	
February 23 – March 30	Baka & Test - Summon the Beasts OVA	2	Baka to Test to Shōkanjū: Matsuri	OVA	Shin Ōnuma	Silver Link	
February 23 – March 30	Baka to Test to Shoukanjuu: Matsuri - Sentakushi Ikou nomi	6	Baka to tesuto to shōkanjū ~-sai ~ sentakushi ikō nomi	Special		Silver Link	
February 23 – April 27	Supernatural the Animation	22	Sūpānachuraru za animēshon	OVA	Atsuko Ishizuka; Shigeyuki Miya	Madhouse	
February 23 – July 20	Saint Seiya: The Lost Canvas 2	13	Seitōshi seiya THE rosuto CANVAS meiōshinwa 2	OVA	Osamu Nabeshima	TMS Entertainment	
February 23 – August 23, 2013	Ah! My Goddess: Together Forever	3	Ah! My Goddess: Itsumo Futari de	OVA	Hiroaki Gohda	AIC	
March 3 – January 19, 2013	The Magic of Chocolate	13	Chocolate no Mahō	OVA	Shinichiro Kimura	SynergySP	
March 6	Kämpfer für die Liebe	2	Kämpfer für die Liebe	Special	Yasuhiro Kuroda	Nomad	
March 12	Nichijou Episode 0	1	Nichijou no 0-wa	OVA	Tatsuya Ishihara	Kyoto Animation	
March 15	Haiyoru! Nyaruani: Remember My Mr. Lovecraft	1	Hai yoru! Nyaruani rimenbā Mai rabu (kurafuto sensei)	Special	Azuma Tani	DLE	
March 16	K-On!!: Plan!	1	Kei on!! Keikaku!	Special		Kyoto Animation	
March 21	Shimanchu MiRiKa	1	Shimanchu MiRiKa	Special	Kyuma Oshita	Soratia	
March 22 – September 27	Sekaiichi Hatsukoi OVA	2	Sekai hatsukoi ovua	OVA		Studio Deen	
March 25 – November 25	Saiyuki Gaiden	3	Saiyuki Gaiden	OVA	Naoyuki Kuzuya	Anpro	
March 25 – September 24, 2012	Hetalia World Series Specials	4	Hetaria World Series ekusutora episōdo	Special		Studio Deen	
March 26	Gosick: Utsukushiki Kaibutsu wa Konton no Sen wo Shimiru	1	Haru kitaru goshikku supesharu - utsukushiki kaibutsu wa konton no saki o mi miru -	Special		Bones	
March 26	Morita-san wa Mukuchi	1	Morita-san wa Mukuchi	OVA	Naotaka Hayashi	Studio Gram	
March 29	Nana to Kaoru	1	Nana to Kaoru	OVA	Hideki Okamoto	AIC Plus+	
March 30	Shukufuku no Campanella: La Campanella Della Benedizione	1	Shukufuku no kanpanera - la campanella della benedizione -	OVA	Shinji Ushiro	AIC	
March 30 – August 24	Freezing Specials	6	Hajike chau! Doki doki toraburu furījingu	Special		A.C.G.T.	
April 6	Sengoku Basara Ni: Ryuko, Itadaki no Chikai! Atsuki Mirai e Kakeru Tamashii!!	1	Sengoku basara ni: Ryūko, itadaki no chikai! Atsuki mirai e kakeru tamashī!!	Special	Kazuya Nomura	Production I.G	
April 13 – June 29	Valkyria Chronicles 3 : Unrecorded Chronicles	2	Senjō no vuarukyuria 3 dare ga tame no jū kasa	OVA	Nobuhiro Kondō	A-1 Pictures	
April 15 – February 29, 2012	Seibu Tetsudou Ekiin Tako-chan	12	Seibu tetsudō ekiin tako-chan	ONA	Tetsuo Yasumi	Shin-Ei Animation	
April 15 – June 17, 2013	Fairy Tail OVA	5	Fearī teiru ovua	OVA	Shinji Ishihira	A-1 Pictures; Satelight	
April 15 – October 17, 2013	Seitokai Yakuindomo OVA	8	OAD gakusei kaiin sōsū	OVA	Hiromitsu Kanazawa	GoHands	
April 16	Detective Conan Magic File 5: Niigata - Tokyo Omiyage Capriccio	1	Meitantei konan MAGIC FILE 2011 ~ Nīgata ~ Tōkyō omiyage kyōsō kyoku (kapurichio)~	OVA	Yasuichiro Yamamoto	TMS Entertainment	
April 18	Cinderella Hime Licca-chan	1	Shinderera hime rika-chan	OVA		Tatsunoko Production	
April 18	Oyayubi-hime Licca-chan	1	Oya yu bihime rika-chan	OVA		Tatsunoko Production	
April 18	Shirayukihime Licca-chan	1	Shira yuki hime rikachan	OVA		Tatsunoko Production	
April 20 – September 21	Kimi ni Todoke: From Me to You Season 2 - Mini Theater	3	Kimi ni todoke minitodo gekijō	Special	Hiro Kaburagi	Production I.G	
April 22 – June 23	Detective Conan vs. Wooo	2	Meitantei konan vs Wooo	ONA		TMS Entertainment	
April 22 – July 10	Potecco Babies (2011)	12	Potekko beibīzu (2011)	ONA		Shin-Ei Animation	
April 26	Highschool of the Dead: Drifters of the Dead	1	Gakuen mokushiroku hai sukūru obu za deddo dorifutāzu Obu za deddo	OVA	Tetsuro Araki	Madhouse	
April 28	Panty & Stocking in Sanitarybox	1	Panty & Stocking in Sanitarybox	Special	Hiroyuki Imaishi	Gainax	
April 29	Amagami SS: Little Sister	1	Amagami SS tachibana miya-hen imōto	Special		AIC	
May 1 – March 1, 2012	Kemurikusa	2	Kemurikusa	ONA	Tatsuki	Yaoyorozu	
May 3	SKET Dance: Tettei Bunseki Special	1	Suketto dansu tettei bunseki supesharu	Special		Tatsunoko Production	
May 3 – May 27	The Squid Girl Specials	2	Shinryaku! Ikako mini ikako no bangai-hen	Special		Diomedéa	
May 11	Maid Sama!: It's an Extra!	1	Kaichō ha meido-sama omakeda yo!	Special		J.C.Staff	
May 16 – July 26, 2012	Plastic Neesan	12	+ Chikku nēsan	ONA	Tsutomu Mizushima	Barnum Studio; TYO Animations	
May 23 – October 26	Katte ni Kaizou	6	Katte ni kaizō	OVA	Akiyuki Simbo; Naoyuki Tatsuwa	Shaft	
May 25	Katte ni Kaizou Specials	3	Katte ni kaizō	Special	Akiyuki Shinbou	Shaft	
May 25 – June 22	Shiki Specials	2	Shikabane oni	Special	Tetsurou Amino	Daume	
May 25 – October 26	A-Channel: +A-Channel	11	A chan'neru	Special		Studio Gokumi	
May 27	Tiger & Bunny Pilot	1	TIGER & BUNNY (taigā Ando banī)	Special		Sunrise	
May 30	Detective Conan OVA 11: A Secret Order from London	1	Meitantei konan ~ rondon kara no maru hi shirei (Rondon kara no maru hi shirei)	OVA	Kōjin Ochi	TMS Entertainment	
June 3 – January 25, 2012	Appleseed XIII	13	Appurushīdo XIII	OVA	Takayuki Hamana	Jinnis Animation Studios; Production I.G	
June 10 – April 24, 2012	Is This a Zombie? OVA	2	Kore ha zonbi desu ka? Ovua	OVA	Takaomi Kanasaki	Studio Deen	
June 11 – August 5	Amagami SS Short Animations	6	Amagami SS	OVA		AIC	
June 15	Asobi ni Iku yo!: Asobi ni Oide - Owari	1	Asobi nī kuyo! Asobi nioi de owari	Special	Yōichi Ueda	AIC PLUS+	
June 15	Cat Planet Cuties: Come Drop By	1	Asobi nī kuyo! Asobi nioi de	OVA	Yōichi Ueda	AIC PLUS+	
June 19	Stitch: Heroes are Hard	1	Sutitchi!~ Zutto saikō no tomodachi ~	Special		Shin-Ei Animation	
June 22 – November 23	Softenni Specials	6	Sofuteni ~tsu	Special		Xebec	
June 22 – March 21, 2012	Blue Exorcist: Ura Eku	10	Ao no futsumashi (ekusoshisuto) ura eku	Special		A-1 Pictures	
June 24	Oretachi ni Tsubasa wa Nai: Hadairo Ritsu Kyuuwari Zou!?	1	Oretachi ni tsubasa ha nai hadairo-ritsu kyū warimashi!?	OVA	Shinji Ushiro	Nomad	
June 24 – June 29, 2012	My Ordinary Life Specials	25	Nichijō orijinaru jikai yokoku	Special		Kyoto Animation	
June 29 – September 26, 2012	Beelzebub Specials	16	Beruzebabu	Special		Pierrot Plus	
July 2	Toei Robot Girls	1	Tōei robotto gāruzu	ONA	Hiroshi Ikehata	Toei Animation	
July 6 – October 5	The Qwaser Of Stigmata II Picture Drama	4	Seikon no kueisā II pikuchā dorama	Special		Hoods Entertainment	
July 13	Oniichan no Koto nanka Zenzen Suki ja Nai n da kara ne!! Special	1	Onīchan no koto nanka zenzen suki janai ndakara ne~tsu! ! Dai 13-wa imōto yori ai o komete ani no "-sei tai kansatsu-ki"	Special		Zexcs	
July 18	Install Pilot	1	Shirushi sutōru	Special	Yoshinobu Sena	Asahi Production	
July 20	Baby Princess 3D Paradise 0 [Love]	1	Beibī purinsesu 3D paradaisu 0 [rabu]	OVA	Takayuki Inagaki	Studio Comet	
July 21 – January 25, 2012	Higurashi: When They Cry - Kira	4	Higurashi no naku koro ni-Kira	OVA	Hideki Tachibana	Studio Deen	
July 22	Ghost in the Shell: Stand Alone Complex: Solid State Society 3D: Tachikomatic Days	3	Kōkaku kidōtai S. A. C. Solid sutēto Society 3D tachikoma na hibi	Special		Production I.G	
July 22	Konnichiwa Anne: Before Green Gables Specials	2	Sekai meisaku gekijō kanketsu-ban kon'nichiwa An ~ Before Green Gables	OVA		Nippon Animation	
July 22	Les Misérables: Shoujo Cosette Specials	2	Sekai meisaku gekijō kanketsu-ban re mizeraburu shōjo kozetto	Special		Nippon Animation	
July 22	Porphy no Nagai Tabi Specials	2	Sekai meisaku gekijō kanketsu-ban porufi no nagai tabi	OVA		Nippon Animation	
July 22 – September 23	30-sai no Hoken Taiiku Specials	3	30-Sai no hoken taiiku	Special	Mankyuu	Gathering	
July 22 – June 22, 2012	Pretty Rhythm: Aurora Dream - Prism Shougekijou	51	Puritī rizumu ōrora dorīmu purizumu Emi gekijō	Special		Tatsunoko Production	
July 27 – December 26, 2012	Hellsing: The Dawn	3	HELLSING THE DAWN	Special	Hiroyuki Ooshima	Graphinica	
July 29	Croisée in a Foreign Labyrinth The Animation: Concert	1	Ikoku meiro no kurowāze The Animation dai 4. 5-Wa ongakkai" Récital"	Special		Satelight	
August 1	Pokémon: Pikachu's Summer Bridge Story	1	Pikachū no samā burijji sutōrī	Special	Kunihiko Yuyama	OLM	
August 2	Dragon Ball Z Kai: Bring Peace to the Future! Goku's Spirit is Eternal	1	Doragon bōru aratame mirai ni heiwa o! Gokū no tamashī yo eien ni	Special		Toei Animation	
August 5 – June 27, 2012	Hakuoki: Demon of the Fleeting Blossom - A Memory of Snow Flowers	6	Hakuōki sekka-roku	OVA	Osamu Yamasaki	Studio Deen	
August 12 – November 3	Copihan	7	Kopihan	ONA		Gonzo	
August 14 – December 31	Carnival Phantasm	12	Kānibaru fantazumu	OVA	Seiji Kishi	Lerche	
August 16	Moshidora Recap	1	Moshi dora futatabi sōshūhen	Special		Production I.G	
August 20	One Piece: Episode of Alabasta - Prologue	1	Gekijō-ban wan pīsu episōdo obu arabasuta	Special		Toei Animation	
August 20	Wandering Son Specials	2	Hōrō musuko	Special		AIC Classic	
August 25	Tantei Opera Milky Holmes: Summer Special	1	Tantei opera mirukyi hōmuzu samā supesharu	Special	Makoto Moriwaki	Artland; J.C.Staff	
August 26 – October 21	VitaminX Addiction	3	VitaminX Addiction	OVA	Keiichiro Kawaguchi	Nomad	
August 26 – October 26	The Prince of Tennis OVA Another Story II	4	Tenisu no ōjisama ovua anazā sutōrī II ~ ano toki no bokura	OVA	Shunsuke Tada	Production I.G	
August 26 – October 26	The Prince of Tennis OVA Another Story II Bonus	2	Tenisu no ōjisama ovua anazā sutōrī II ~ ano toki no bokura	Special	Shunsuke Tada	Production I.G	
September 7	Astarotte's Toy! EX	1	Asutarotte no omocha! EX	OVA	Fumitoshi Oizaki	Diomedéa	
September 7 – January 26, 2012	Busou Shinki: Moon Angel	10	Busōshinki Moon enzeru	ONA	Masayuki Kojima	Kinema Citrus; TNK	
September 16	The World God Only Knows: Four Girls and an Idol	1	Kami nomi zo shiru sekai: 4-ri to aidoru	OVA	Shigehito Takayanagi	Manglobe	
September 21 – February 22, 2012	Baka to Test to Shoukanjuu: Spinout! Sore ga Bokura no Nichijou	6	Baka to tesuto to shōkanjū SPINOUT! Sore ga bokura no nichijō. Ensei-chū	Special		SILVER LINK.	
September 21 – February 22, 2012	Kamisama Dolls Specials	6	Kamisama dooruzu	Special		Brain's Base	
September 21 – March 21, 2012	La croisée dans un labyrinthe étranger: Yune & Alice	7	Ikoku meiro no kurowāze `yune& Arisu'	Special		Satelight	
September 21 – March 21, 2012	Nekogami Yaoyorozu Specials	7	Nekogami yaoyorozu	Special	Hiroaki Sakurai	AIC PLUS+	
September 22	Haganai: Black Hotpot Gives Girls a Bad Smell	1	Boku ha tomodachi ga sukunai: yaminabe wa bishōjo ga zan'nen'na kusai	OVA	Hisashi Saito	AIC Build	
September 25 – December 25	Nura: Rise of the Yokai Clan - Demon Capital	2	Nurarihyon no mago	Special		Studio Deen	
September 26	Goulart Knights: Evoked the Beginning White	1	Gurāru kishi-dan Evoked THE Beginning White	OVA	Masahiro Sonoda	Studio Blanc.	
September 29	Kiss Dum: Omokage	1	Kisu damu: Omokage	Special		Satelight	
September 30 – February 24, 2012	A Dark Rabbit has Seven Lives Picture Drama	6	Itsuka tenma no kuro usagi pikuchā dorama	Special		Zexcs	
October 4 – January 7, 2012	Manyuu Hikenchou Specials	8	Manyū hikenchō binyū tanren-hō chichi togi	Special	Hiraku Kaneko	Hoods Entertainment	
October 5 – April 19, 2012	Kimezō no Kimarimonku Ja Kimaranee. Featuring Sabu-Otoko	12	Kimezō no kimari monku ja Kima-ra nē. Featuring sabu otoko	ONA		Shin-Ei Animation	
October 8	Deadman Wonderland: The Red Knife Wielder	1	Deddoman wandārando akai naifu tsukai	OVA	Koichi Hatsumi	Manglobe	
October 10	This Boy Can Fight Aliens	1	Kono danshi, uchūbito to tatakaemasu.	OVA	Soubi Yamamoto	CoMix Wave Films	
October 10 – January 28, 2012	The Legend of Heroes: Trails in the Sky	2	Hideo densetsu sora no kiseki THE animēshon	OVA	Masaki Tachibana	Kinema Citrus	
October 19	Rio: Rainbow Gate! Special	1	Rio reinbō gēto!	Special		Xebec	
October 26	Baka and Test - Summon the Beasts: Magical Hideyoshi Hideyoshi	1	Baka to tesuto to shōkanjū ni ~tsu! "Mahō Hideyoshi Hide yoshi"	Special		SILVER LINK.	
October 26	Blue Exorcist: Kuro Runs Away From Home	1	Ao no futsumashi (ekusoshisuto) kuro no iede	Special		A-1 Pictures	
October 26 – March 21, 2012	La croisée dans un labyrinthe étranger Picture Drama	6	Ikoku meiro no kurowāze pikuchā dorama	Special		Satelight	
October 28 – January 27, 2012	Usagi Drop Specials	4	Usagi doroppu	Special		Production I.G	
October 29 – January 28, 2012	Queen's Blade OVA	2	Kuīnzu bureido	OVA	Shigenori Kageyama	Arms	
October 29 – January 28, 2012	Queen's Blade OVA Specials	2	Kuīnzu bureido	Special	Shigenori Kageyama	Arms	
October 30 – November 6	Hidamari Sketch × SP	2	Hida mari suketchi ×SP	Special	Akiyuki Shinbou	Shaft	
November 12	Ikki Tousen: Shūgaku Tōshi Keppu-roku	1	Ikkitōsen-shū tsuba tōshi keppūroku	OVA	Rion Kujo	Arms	
November 16	YuruYuri: For Whatever Reason, Never Ending, Heart Throbbing, Pitter-patter, Paradox Eternal	1	Yuru Yuri dōshite ☆ tomaranai ☆ tokimeki ☆ dokidoki ☆ paradokusu ☆ etānaru	Special		Doga Kobo	
November 23	Tales of Symphonia The Animation: Sekai Tougou-hen	3	Teiruzu obu shinfonia THE animēshon sekai tōgō-hen	OVA	Haruo Sotozaki	ufotable	
November 25	Precure All Stars DX the Dance Live♥: Miracle Dance Stage e Youkoso	1	Purikyua ōru sutāzu DX the DANCE raivu ♥ ~ mirakuru dansu sutēji e yōkoso ~	OVA	Naoki Miyahara	Toei Animation	
November 26	Carnival Phantasm EX Season	1	Kānibaru fantazumu EX sezon	OVA	Seiji Kishi	Lerche	
December 1	Kyousogiga	1	Kyousou Giga	ONA	Rie Matsumoto	Toei Animation	
December 2	Lupin III: Blood Seal of the Eternal Mermaid	1	Rupan sansei chi no kokuin - eien no Mermaid	Special	Teiichi Takiguchi	Telecom Animation Film	
December 5	Itsuka Tenma no Kuro Usagi: Kokoro Utsuri no Toukoubi - School Attendance Day	1	Itsuka tenma no kuro usagi kokoro utsuri no tōkō-bi ~ sukuru·-atendansu· de~i ~	OVA	Shunsuke Fukui	Zexcs	
December 7	Honto ni Atta! Reibai Sensei: Gyakushuu no Kurage.	1	Hontoni atta! Reibai sensei gyakushū no kurage.	Special		DLE	
December 7	IS: Infinite Stratos Encore - Koi ni Kogareru Rokujuusou	1	IS 〈infinitto sutoratosu〉ankōru "koi ni kogareru rokujūsō"	OVA	Yasuhito Kikuchi	8bit	
December 7	Sengoku Basara Movie: 4-koma Gekijou - Another Last Party	5	Gekijō-ban sengoku basara 4koma gekijō - anazā Last pātī -	Special		Production I.G	
December 8 – December 23	Inazuma Eleven Go Specials	2	Inazuma irebun GO tokubetsu-hen	Special		OLM	
December 11	Zero Escape: VLR prologue	1	Kyokugen dasshutsu ADV zen'nin shiboudesu puromōshon'anime	ONA		Gonzo	
December 13	R-15: R15 Shounen Hyouryuuki	1	Aru jū go R 15 shōnen hyōryū-ki	OVA	Daisuke Takashima	AIC	
December 16 – January 18, 2012	Major: World Series	2	Mejā wārudo shirīzu-hen	OVA	Riki Fukushima	SynergySP	
December 17	Battle Break	1	Batoru bureiku	ONA	Shinji Ushiro	OLM	
December 17	Dragon Ball: Episode of Bardock	1	Doragon bōru episōdo Obu bādakku	Special	Yoshihiro Ueda	Toei Animation	
December 17 – April 9, 2012	Yakimochi Caprice	2	Yaki mochi kyōsōkyoku	Special		AIC	
December 17 – June 23, 2012	Rurouni Kenshin: New Kyoto Arc	2	Rurōni kenshin - Meiji kenkaku roman Tan - shin Kyōto-hen	OVA	Kazuhiro Furuhashi	Studio Deen	
December 21	Hoshizora e Kakaru Hashi: Kakaru ka? Gakuensai ni Koi no Hashi	1	Hoshizora he kakaru hashi kakaru ka? Gakuen-sai ni koi no hashi	Special		Doga Kobo	
December 21	Aria the Scarlet Ammo Special	1	Hidan no Aria: Butei ga Kitarite Onsen Kenshuu	Special		J.C.Staff	
December 21	Toradora! Special	1	Tora dora! Bentō no gokui	Special		J.C.Staff	
December 21 – May 16, 2012	Ben-To Picture Drama	6	Ben tō	Special		David Production	
December 21 – May 25, 2012	Maken-Ki! Secret Training	6	Makenkid dokidoki~tsu! Makenki himitsu no kunren	Special		AIC Spirits	
December 22 – December 20, 2012	Busō Chūgakusei Basket Army	5	Busō chūgakusei basuketto āmī	ONA	Romanov Higa	asread; StudioRF Inc.	
December 29	Gattai Robot Atranger	1	Gattai robotto atoranjā	OVA	Tōru Yoshida	AIC	
December 29	Justeen	1	Jasutīn	OVA	Yukio Nishimoto	AIC	
December 31	Fate/Prototype	1	Fate/Prototype	OVA	Seiji Kishi	Lerche	

== Deaths ==
- April 17 - Osamu Dezaki, film director, screenwriter
- July 23 - Toyoo Ashida, director, character designer, animator, animation director, screenwriter

== See also ==
- 2011 in animation
