= Ryouki Kamitsubo =

Japanese director and storyboard artist

Ryouki Kamitsubo 上坪 亮樹
- Born: Japan
- Other name: Motona Hino (日野基鳴)
- Occupations: Director, storyboard artist
- Years active: 1991–present
- Employer(s): Film Magic (1991~1992); Media Vision (1996~1998); Gonzo (1998~2000)
- Known for: Hidamari Sketch; Softenni; Hen Semi

Ryouki Kamitsubo (Japanese: 上坪 亮樹, Hepburn: Kamitsubo Ryōki) is a Japanese director and storyboard artist best known for co-directing Hidamari Sketch with Akiyuki Shinbo.

== Career ==
Kamitsubo began his career in the anime industry as a production manager for Film Magic in the early 90s. He transitioned to digital photography and visual effects work for Media Vision and, later, Gonzo in the mid and late 90s. In the early 2000s, he started doing episode directing and storyboard work. In 2004, he worked under Akiyuki Shinbo on the original anime series Magical Girl Lyrical Nanoha, and the following year was brought into Shaft by Shinbo, where his first project with the company was as an episode director on Tsukuyomi: Moon Phase. He would later make his series directorial debut with Shinbo and Shaft in 2007 with Hidamari Sketch. Shinbo considered Kamitsubo, (at the time) setting designer Tatsuya Oishi, and art director Hisaharu Iijima to be the core staff responsible for the foundations of the style and presentation of Hidamari Sketch, even after both Kamitsubo and Oishi had left the series' production in their respective seasons. Kamitsubo continued working with Shaft for a few years before deciding to base his work mostly out of Xebec, including his own series Softenni and Hen Semi. In 2012, however, he announced that he would be leaving the industry, and his final work would be as a storyboard artist and episode director on the tenth episode of To Love Ru: Darkness under the pseudonym Motona Hino (日野基鳴, Hino Motona). Despite this, Kamitsubo returned to the industry in 2014, acting as a storyboard artist for Xebec's series Argevollen beginning with the 13th episode. Since 2017, Kamitsubo has mainly worked on series produced by Doga Kobo.

== Works ==
=== Television series ===
In "Director(s)" column highlights Kamitsubi's directorial works.

| Year | Title | Director(s) | Studio | SB (Note: Storyboard artist.) | ED (Note: Episode director, equivalent to unit director.) | Other roles and notes | Ref(s) |
|---|---|---|---|---|---|---|---|
| 1991 | Genji Tsūshin Agedama | Masao Namiki | Studio Gallop | No | No | Production assistant | |
| 1991 | Hime-chan's Ribbon | Hatsuki Tsuji | Studio Gallop | No | No | Production assistant | |
| 1997 | GeGeGe no Kitarō 4th Series | Daisuke Nishio | Toei Animation | No | No | Digital photography | |
| 1998 | Himitsu no Akko-chan | Hiroki Shibata | Toei Animation | No | No | Digital photography | |
| 2000 | Gate Keepers | Junichi Sato (chief); Koichi Chigira | Gonzo | No | No | Photography | |
| 2001 | Star Ocean EX | Hiroshi Watanabe | Studio Deen | No | Yes | | |
| 2001 | Hellsing | Umanosuke Iida (chief); Yasunori Urata | Gonzo | Yes | Yes | | |
| 2003 | Bomberman Jetters | Katsuyuki Kodera | Studio Deen | No | Yes | | |
| 2003 | Peacemaker Kurogane | Tomohiro Hirata | Gonzo | Yes | Yes | Digital director | |
| 2003 | The Mythical Detective Loki Ragnarok | Hiroshi Watanabe | Studio Deen | No | No | Opening director Ending director | |
| 2004 | AM Driver | Isao Torada | Studio Deen | No | Yes | | |
| 2004 | Magical Girl Lyrical Nanoha | Akiyuki Shinbo | Seven Arcs | No | Yes | | |
| 2004 | Yumeria | Keitarō Motonaga | Studio Deen | No | Yes | | |
| 2005 | Tsukuyomi: Moon Phase | Akiyuki Shinbo | Shaft | No | Yes | Key animator | |
| 2005 | Gun x Sword | Gorō Taniguchi | AIC ASTA | No | Yes | | |
| 2006 | Inukami! | Keizō Kusakawa | Seven Arcs | No | Yes | | |
| 2006 | Negima!? | Akiyuki Shinbo; Shin Oonuma (chief) | Shaft | Yes | Yes | | |
| 2007 | Ef: A Tale of Memories | Shin Oonuma | Shaft | Yes | Yes | | |
| 2007 | Hidamari Sketch | Akiyuki Shinbo (chief); Ryouki Kamitsubo (chief) | Shaft | Yes | Yes | Ending director | |
| 2007 | Hidamari Sketch Specials | Akiyuki Shinbo (chief) | Shaft | Yes | Yes | | |
| 2008 | Dinosaur King: Season 2 | Katsuyoshi Yatabe | Sunrise | Yes | No | | |
| 2008 | Kyōran Kazoku Nikki | Yasuhiro Kuroda | Nomad | Yes | Yes | | |
| 2008 | Hidamari Sketch x 365 | Akiyuki Shinbo | Shaft | No | No | Ending director | |
| 2008 | Hyakko | Michio Fukuda | Nippon Animation | Yes | Yes | | |
| 2008 | Kyō no Go no Ni | Tsuyoshi Nagasawa | Xebec | Yes | Yes | | |
| 2009 | Pandora Hearts | Takao Kato | Xebec | Yes | Yes | | |
| 2009 | Polyphonica: Crimson S | Toshimasa Suzuki | Diomedéa | Yes | No | | |
| 2010 | Ladies versus Butlers! | Atsushi Ōtsuki | Xebec | Yes | Yes | | |
| 2010 | Durarara!! | Takahiro Omori | Brain's Base | Yes | No | | |
| 2011 | Softenni | Ryouki Kamitsubo | Xebec | Yes | Yes | Series composition Ending director | |
| 2012 | To Love Ru Darkness | Atsushi Ōtsuki | Xebec | Yes | Yes | Credited as Motona Hino | |
| 2012 | Lagrange: The Flower of Rin-ne | Tatsuo Satō (chief); Toshimasa Suzuki | Xebec | Yes | Yes | | |
| 2012 | Saki: Episode of Side A | Manabu Ono | Studio Gokumi | No | Yes | | |
| 2014 | Argevollen | Atsushi Ōtsuki | Xebec | Yes | No | | |
| 2014 | Trinity Seven | Hiroshi Nishikiori | Seven Arcs Pictures | Yes | No | | |
| 2015 | Kin-iro Mosaic | Tensho | Studio Gokumi | Yes | No | | |
| 2015 | Fafner in the Azure: Exodus | Takashi Noto (chief); Nobuyoshi Habara | Xebec Zwei | No | Yes | | |
| 2015 | Plastic Memories | Yoshiyuki Fujiwara | Doga Kobo | Yes | No | | |
| 2015 | Triage X | Takao Kato; Akio Takami | Xebec | Yes | Yes | | |
| 2016 | Re:Zero − Starting Life in Another World | Masaharu Watanabe | White Fox | Yes | No | | |
| 2016 | Big Order | Nobuharu Kamanaka | Asread | Yes | Yes | | |
| 2016 | New Game! | Yoshiyuki Fujiwara | Doga Kobo | Yes | Yes | | |
| 2017 | Gabriel DropOut | Masahiko Ohta | Doga Kobo | Yes | Yes | | |
| 2017 | Gamers! | Manabu Okamoto | Pine Jam | Yes | Yes | | |
| 2017 | Eromanga Sensei | Ryōhei Takeshita | A-1 Pictures | Yes | No | | |
| 2017 | Hina Logi ~from Luck & Logic~ | Hiroaki Akagi | Doga Kobo | Yes | Yes | | |
| 2018 | Hozuki's Coolheadedness | Kazuhiro Yoneda | Studio Deen | Yes | No | | |
| 2018 | Hinomaru Sumo | Kōnosuke Uda (chief); Yasutaka Yamamoto | Gonzo | Yes | No | | |
| 2018 | Uchi no Maid ga Uzasugiru! | Masahiko Ohta | Doga Kobo | Yes | Yes | | |
| 2018 | Anima Yell! | Masako Satō | Doga Kobo | Yes} | No | | |
| 2019 | Wataten!: An Angel Flew Down to Me | Daisuke Hiramaki | Doga Kobo | Yes | Yes | | |
| 2019 | The Helpful Fox Senko-san | Tomoaki Koshida | Doga Kobo | Yes | Yes | Ending director and storyboard | |
| 2020 | A3! Season Spring & Summer | Masayuki Sakoi (series); Keisuke Shinohara | P.A. Works; Studio 3Hz | Yes | No | | |
| 2020 | Diary of Our Days at the Breakwater | Takaharu Ōkuma | Doga Kobo | Yes | Yes | | |
| 2021 | The Hidden Dungeon Only I Can Enter | Kenta Ōnishi | Okuruto Noboru | No | Yes | | |
| 2021 | My Senpai Is Annoying | Ryōta Itō | Doga Kobo | Yes | Yes | | |
| 2021 | Amaim Warrior at the Borderline | Nobuyoshi Habara | Sunrise Beyond | Yes | Yes | | |
| 2022 | Don't Hurt Me, My Healer! | Nobuaki Nakanishi | Jumondou | Yes | Yes | | |
| 2022 | Shikimori's Not Just a Cutie | Ryōta Itō | Doga Kobo | Yes | Yes | | |
| 2022 | Healer Girl | Yasuhiro Irie | 3Hz | No | Yes | | |
| 2023 | Saint Cecilia and Pastor Lawrence | Sumie Noro | Doga Kobo | Yes | Yes | | |
| 2025 | The Shiunji Family Children | Ryouki Kamitsubo | Doga Kobo | Yes | Yes | Opening director | |

==== OVAs ====
| Year | Title | Director(s) | Studio | SB | ED | Other roles and notes | Ref(s) |
|---|---|---|---|---|---|---|---|
| 1998 | Blue Submarine No. 6 | Mahiro Maeda | Gonzo | No | No | Visual effects | |
| 2000 | Melty Lancer | Takeshi Mori | Gonzo | No | No | CG director | |
| 2005 | Maria-sama ga Miteru | Yukihiro Matsushita | Studio Deen | No | No | Ending director | |
| 2010 | Hen Semi | Ryouki Kamitsubo | Xebec | Yes | Yes | Ending director (uncredited) | |
| 2015 | Magical Suite Prism Nana: I Want to Fulfill My Dreams!? Hope Advancing (First Half) | Yukihiro Miyamoto | Shaft | Yes | No | | |
| 2017 | Star Blazers: Space Battleship Yamato 2202 | Nobuyoshi Habara | Xebec | Yes | Yes | | |
| 2019 | Wataten!: An Angel Flew Down to Me | Daisuke Hiramaki | Doga Kobo | No | Yes | | |

=== Films ===
| Year | Title | Director(s) | Studio | SB | ED | Other roles and notes | Ref(s) |
|---|---|---|---|---|---|---|---|
| 2020 | Kono Sekai no Tanoshimikata: Secret Story Film | Fumie Muroi | CLAP | No | Yes | | |

== Notes ==
=== Works cited ===
- Kizawa, Yukito, ed. (2013). ひだまりスケッチデイズ -TVアニメ公式ガイドブック- [Hidamari Sketch Days: TV Anime Official Guidebook]. Houbunsha. ISBN 978-4832277403.
