= Keijo (manga) =

Japanese manga series and its adaptations

- First tankōbon volume cover

競女!!!!!!!!
- Genre: Comedy, sports
- Manga
- Written by: Daichi Sorayomi
- Published by: Shogakukan
- Imprint: Shōnen Sunday Comics
- Magazine: Weekly Shōnen Sunday
- Original run: July 24, 2013 – April 26, 2017
- Volumes: 18
- Anime television series
- Directed by: Hideya Takahashi
- Produced by: Nobuhiro Nakayama; Jun Fukuda; Takatoshi Chino; Takeshi Okamura; Ryūtaro Usukura; Toshiyasu Hayashi; Atsushi Aitani
- Written by: Takao Kato
- Music by: Hayato Matsuo
- Studio: Xebec
- Licensed by: Crunchyroll; SA/SEA: Medialink
- Original network: Tokyo MX, AT-X, BS11
- Original run: October 6, 2016 – December 22, 2016
- Episodes: 12 + 6 OVAs
- icon

Keijo (競女), also known as Hip Whip Girl, is a Japanese manga series written and illustrated by Daichi Sorayomi. It was serialized in Shogakukan's shōnen manga magazine Weekly Shōnen Sunday from July 2013 to April 2017, with its chapters collected in 18 tankōbon volumes. It follows a gymnast participating in a fictional women-only contact sport, where players use only their breasts and buttocks to tackle opponents. An anime television series adaptation produced by Xebec aired from October to December 2016.

== Plot ==
In an alternate reality, the women-only competitive sport keijo becomes a fad in Japan. The rules for the game are simple: the match is held in a swimming pool stadium. Participants must stand atop circular platforms floating in a pool, referred to as "lands". They can defeat their opponents by knocking them off their respective platforms and into the water, using only their breasts or buttocks. The sport attracts millions of viewers across the country and boasts a lavish prize pool. This prompts many aspiring athletes from different sports to try to succeed in keijo.

Raised in a poor family, Nozomi Kaminashi, a gifted gymnast, enters a keijo training academy after graduating from high school and hopes to earn a fortune.

== Characters ==
Nozomi Kaminashi (神無 のぞみ, Kaminashi Nozomi)
Voiced by: Lynn (Japanese); Amber Lee Connors (English)
An athletic, cheerful, and energetic girl wishing to become the richest player. Her fighting type is "Infighter". Her technique, the "Vacuum Butt Cannon", can send anyone or anything far. She is sometimes a troublemaker and occasionally gets stuck in tough situations. Despite her initial loss, she learns all she can about keijo. She has dark blue eyes and a long hair, and wears a white ribbon.
Sayaka Miyata (宮田 さやか, Miyata Sayaka)
Voiced by: M.A.O (Japanese); Felecia Angelle (English)
A former judo champion, a promising recruits, and the fastest player. Her fighting type is "Outfighter". Despite her classmates' antics, she is a caring friend to her roommates and solves problems with them. She has dark blue eyes and a blue ribbon tied in her short, white hair. Her father disapproves of her decision to play keijo instead of judo, but accepts it when she participates a match in the East–West War event.
Kazane Aoba (青葉 風音, Aoba Kazane)
Voiced by: Kaede Hondo (Japanese); Alexis Tipton (English)
A shy resident of Hiroshima with a dialect and self-conscious. Her ponytail moves when she is addressed or feeling emotional. Her right hand is sensitive and can copy her opponents' abilities by feeling up their buttocks, an ability she calls "Scanning Hand". In addition, she learns a strategy with special abilities from her friends as the situation demands in the East–West War. Her fighting style is "Counter". She has a brown eyes and a ponytail.
Non Toyoguchi (豊口 のん, Toyoguchi Non)
Voiced by: Saori Ōnishi (Japanese); Sarah Wiedenheft (English)
A countryside village girl wishing to gain popularity and revitalize her village. She has the softest buttocks and breasts, absorbing attacks and reflecting them back. She is clumsy, absent-minded, and gets into comical situations. She and Kazane have unusual accents, which is why Nozomi misunderstands them at first. She has red eyes and a pigtail hairstyle.
Hanabi Kawai (河合 花火, Kawai Hanabi)
Voiced by: Rena Maeda (Japanese); Kristen McGuire (English)
An Elite Class Rank 3. She is a sports prodigy ever since childhood. Because of this, she makes friends upon joining keijo. She has a happy-go-lucky attitude when playing on the Land. Her attack strategy is to immobilize her opponents. Her attack style is "Infighter". She has short light purple hair and eyes.
Mio Kusakai (日下生 美桜, Kusakai Mio)
Voiced by: Hibiku Yamamura (Japanese); Michelle Rojas (English)
An Elite Class Rank 1 player and a lesbian. She flirts with classmates and opponents sometimes. For her "Breast Hypnosis" technique, she moves her breasts like a pendulum, immobilizing her opponents. The technique was later banned from school. Her fighting style is "Infighter". She has long blonde hair and light blue eyes.
Rin Rokudō (六堂 鈴, Rokudō Rin)
Voiced by: Rie Takahashi (Japanese); Alex Moore (English)
An Elite Class Rank 2. She initially claims to be the fastest "Outfighter" in Western Japan, which starts a rivalry between her and Sayaka. She is a former swimmer with a large lung capacity and quick movement. Her favorite technique is the "Butt Gatling". Her nickname is "Rinrin". She has short blue hair and eyes.
Yuko Ōshima (大島 優子, Ōshima Yuko)
Voiced by: Misa Kayama^{Ep. 1 credits} (Japanese); Morgan Berry (English)
The main teacher in the West. She instructs the girls in ways related to keijo, such as hip toss with the beach ball and morning exercises. She has amazing speed throughout the series. She has a brown ponytail and eyes.
Nagisa Ujibe (氏部 凪, Ujibe Nagisa)
Voiced by: Mabuki Andō^{Ep. 1 credits} (Japanese); Jamie Marchi (English)
One of the first keijo players and "prize queens", she was known as the "Alluring Siren" in the past. In the present, she is Nozomi's teacher. She is the first to recognize Nozomi's "Vacuum Butt Cannon" and knows the dangers of the attack, as she once used it herself. She is the owner of the UTMs (advanced swimsuits), before Nozomi joins the elite class in preparation for the East–West War. She has a rivalry with the keijo training school's head teacher in the East. She has orange hair and eyes, and a high weight compared to when she was a teenager.
Miku Kobayakawa (小早川 未来, Kobayakawa Miku)
Voiced by: Yoko Hikasa^{Ep. 1 credits} (Japanese); Dawn M. Bennett (English)
One of the other teachers in the West. She has long blonde hair and an unknown eye colour.
Kotone Fujisaki (藤崎 琴音, Fujisaki Kotone)
Voiced by: Shizuka Ishigami (Japanese); Jad Saxton (English)
An Elite Class Rank 4. She comes from a family of players and is naturally gifted for sports. Before meeting Nozomi, Kotone saw keijo as nothing more than work. She attacks while her back is turned and uses the vibrations on the Land to detect and predict her opponents' movements without looking. Her buttocks release an aura in the form of a dog and appear to hone in on her target. She listens to boys' love stories on a headset and fantasizes about them, sometimes during the match. Her fighting style is "Infighter". She has short blue hair and eyes.

== Media ==
=== Manga ===
Written and illustrated by Daichi Sorayomi, Keijo!!!!!!!! was serialized in Shogakukan's shōnen manga magazine Weekly Shōnen Sunday from July 24, 2013, to April 26, 2017. Shogakukan collected the chapters in eighteen tankōbon volumes, released from November 18, 2013, to July 18, 2017.

==== Volumes ====
No.	Japanese release date	Japanese ISBN
1	November 18, 2013	978-4-09-124505-2
2	February 18, 2014	978-4-09-124565-6
3	May 16, 2014	978-4-09-124645-5
4	August 18, 2014	978-4-09-125080-3
5	November 18, 2014	978-4-09-125373-6
6	February 18, 2015	978-4-09-125598-3
7	May 18, 2015	978-4-09-125839-7
8	August 18, 2015	978-4-09-126208-0
9	November 18, 2015	978-4-09-126487-9
10	February 18, 2016	978-4-09-126777-1
11	May 18, 2016	978-4-09-127137-2
12	September 16, 2016	978-4-09-127337-6
13	October 18, 2016	978-4-09-127409-0
14	December 16, 2016	978-4-09-127423-6
15	March 17, 2017	978-4-09-127506-6
16	May 18, 2017	978-4-09-127565-3
17	June 16, 2017	978-4-09-127580-6
18	July 18, 2017	978-4-09-127725-1

=== Anime ===
An anime television series adaptation produced by Xebec was announced in February 2016. It was directed by Hideya Takahashi, written by Takao Kato, composed by Hayato Matsuo, and had the characters designed by Keiya Nakano. It aired from October 6 to December 22, 2016. The opening theme song is "Dream × Scramble!", performed by Airi, while the ending theme song is "Fantas/Hip Girlfriends!", performed by Lynn, M.A.O, Kaede Hondo, and Saori Ōnishi. The series was released on six Blu-ray and DVD home video volumes, and each volume includes an original video animation episode.

The anime was streamed by Crunchyroll and Funimation, the latter of which streamed an English dub. After Sony acquired Crunchyroll, the English dub was added to the service. Medialink licensed the series in Asia-Pacific.

==== Episodes ====
No.	Title (Note: All English titles are taken from Funimation.)	Original release date
1	"Setouchi Keijo Training School!!!!"; Transliteration: "Setouchi Keijo Yōsei Gakkō!!!!" (Japanese: 瀬戸内競女養成学校!!!!)	October 6, 2016
Nozomi and her friends pass a try-out at school.
2	"The Hip Toss Brings Us Together!!!!"; Transliteration: "Danketsu no Hippu Tosu!!!!" (Japanese: 団結のヒップトス!!!!)	October 13, 2016
The girls spend the first day of the term. Nozomi uses the "Vacuum Butt Cannon" for the first time.
3	"Vacuum Butt Cannon!!!!"; Transliteration: "Shinkū Rekketsu!!!!" (Japanese: 真空烈尻（しんくうれっけつ）!!!!)	October 20, 2016
Nozomi finds the UTM too hard to move in until it becomes routine after a month.
4	"The Battle for the Fastest Butt!!!!"; Transliteration: "Saisoku Kettei-sen!!!!" (Japanese: 最速尻定戦（さいそくけつていせん）!!!!)	October 27, 2016
Mio uses "Breast Hypnosis" to defeat other opponents.
5	"Full-Auto Cerberus!!!!"; Transliteration: "Jidō geigeki (furuōto) keruberosu!!!!" (Japanese: 自動迎撃（フルオート）ケルベロス!!!!)	November 3, 2016
After Nozomi defeats Kotone, Nagisa disqualifies Mio and praises Nozomi.
6	"Alluring Kyoto Trip!!!!"; Transliteration: "Miwaku no Kyōto gasshuku!!!!" (Japanese: 魅惑の京都合宿!!!!)	November 10, 2016
The girls and their teachers go on a class trip to Kyoto.
7	"Where the Turnips Lead!!!!"; Transliteration: "Kabu no michibiku saki!!!!" (Japanese: カブの導く先!!!!)	November 17, 2016
Nozomi trains by extracting turnips from the ground with a rope tied to her torso.
8	"The Dramatic East-West War!!!!"; Transliteration: "Haran hisshi no tōzai-sen!!!!" (Japanese: 波乱必至の東西戦!!!!)	November 24, 2016
After Nozomi defeats Usagi Tsukishita, the west school team arrives at Nishinomiya to meet the other team from the east. The contestants invite them for a tournament.
9	"Ruler of the Jungle Gym!!!!"; Transliteration: "Jangurujimu no hasha!!!!" (Japanese: ジャングルジムの覇者!!!!)	December 1, 2016
Sayaka inspires her west team to win the round.
10	"The Second East÷-West War Race!!!!"; Transliteration: "Tōzai-sen dai ni rēsu!!!!" (Japanese: 東西戦第二レース!!!!)	December 8, 2016
Kazane copies the moves of anyone whose buttocks she touches. As all opponents are sent overboard, the east wins the match with Sanae Hououin barely avoiding the water.
11	"The Castle of the Final Match!!!!"; Transliteration: "Kessen no shiro!!!!" (Japanese: 決戦の城!!!!)	December 15, 2016
The castle sinks after all players are defeated. Maya Sakashiro gets frightened and reveals her alter ego Kaya.
12	"The Heated Battle's Rear-End!!!!"; Transliteration: "Nessen Shūketsu!!!!" (Japanese: 熱戦終尻(しゅうけつ)!!!!)	December 22, 2016
Nozomi defeats Maya after helping her fight her alter ego. The girls graduate from school. Nozomi and Sayaka become professional players in the Chūgoku region.

==== Specials ====
No.	Title	Original release date
1	"Figure 8utt" Transliteration: "Shiri 8 no ji" (Japanese: 尻8の字)	November 23, 2016
2	"Buttbox"; Transliteration: "Shiribokkusu" (Japanese: 尻ボイパ)	December 21, 2016
3	"From Empty Room to Store Room"; Transliteration: "Aki Heya kara Monooki Heya e" (Japanese: 空き部屋から物置き部屋へ)	January 25, 2017
4	"East-West War Eve"; Transliteration: "Tōzai-sen Zen'ya" (Japanese: 東西戦前夜)	March 8, 2017
5	"Midnight Buttle"; Transliteration: "Mayonaka no Shiri-sen" (Japanese: 真夜中の尻戦)	March 29, 2017
6	"Forever a Keijo Competitor"; Transliteration: "Keijo yo Eien (to wa) ni" (Japanese: 競女よ永遠（とは）に)	May 31, 2017

=== Other media ===
The video game Dead or Alive Xtreme 3 has a crossover promotion with Keijo!!!!!!!!, with in-game swimsuits based on the series.

== Reception ==
In November 2016, Crunchyroll revealed Keijo!!!!!!!! as the most viewed anime series in the United States. It was the most popular in nine states, with only Yuri on Ice and Drifters, being most viewed in more states. In 2017, fans in Portugal were in the planning stages for a defictionalized Keijo sport league. The rules of the defictionalized version were modified and protective gear for the breasts, rear, and thighs were added to make the sport "safer and more realistic". A proof of concept video showed a match in action, and the league planned to scout for interested parties and venues for play.
