= Takao Kato =

Japanese anime director and screenwriter

- 加戸誉夫
- Occupations: Anime director and screenwriter
- Years active: 1987–present
- Known for: MegaMan NT Warrior; Buso Renkin; To Love Ru; Pandora Hearts
- Children: 2

Takao Kato (Japanese: 加戸誉夫, Hepburn: Katō Takao) is a Japanese anime director and screenwriter. Kato started working in the anime industry in 1987 and directed his first full series in 1996. Since then, some of the series he has directed include MegaMan NT Warrior, Buso Renkin, To Love Ru, and Pandora Hearts.

== Biography ==
Kato has cited Hayao Miyazaki's early works, particularly The Castle of Cagliostro and Future Boy Conan, as influences on his work. Kato started working in the anime industry in 1987 and was put in charge of directing for the first time with Bakusō Kyōdai Let's & Go!! in 1996. Following Bakusō Kyōdai Let's & Go!!, he directed MegaMan NT Warrior, Buso Renkin, To Love Ru, and Pandora Hearts, among others.

== Personal life ==
Kato has two daughters.

== Filmography ==
=== TV series ===
| Year | Title | Studio | Director | Writer | Ref |
|---|---|---|---|---|---|
| 1996–1998 | Bakusō Kyōdai Let's & Go!! | Xebec | Yes (Note: Co-directed with Tetsurō Amino) | No | |
| 1998–1999 | Super Yo-Yo | Xebec | Yes | No | |
| 1999–2000 | Zoids: Chaotic Century | Xebec | Yes | No | |
| 2001 | Zoids: New Century | Xebec | Yes | No | |
| 2002–2003 | MegaMan NT Warrior | Xebec | Yes | No | |
| 2003–2004 | MegaMan NT Warrior: Axess | Xebec | Yes | No | |
| 2004–2005 | MegaMan NT Warrior: Stream | Xebec | Yes | No | |
| 2005–2006 | MegaMan NT Warrior: Beast | Xebec | Yes | No | |
| 2006 | MegaMan NT Warrior: Beast+ | Xebec | Yes | No | |
| 2006–2007 | Mega Man Star Force | Xebec | Yes | No | |
| 2007–2008 | Ryūsei no Rockman Tribe | Xebec | Yes | No | |
| 2006–2007 | Buso Renkin | Xebec | Yes | No | |
| 2007 | Over Drive | Xebec | Yes | No | |
| 2008 | To Love Ru | Xebec | Yes | No | |
| 2009 | Pandora Hearts | Xebec | Yes | No | |
| 2010–2013 | Keshikasu-kun | Shogakukan Music & Digital Entertainment | Yes | No | |
| 2011 | Rio: Rainbow Gate! | Xebec | Yes | No | |
| 2011 | Hen Semi | Xebec | Yes | No | |
| 2011–2014 | Duel Masters Victory | Shogakukan Music & Digital Entertainment | Yes | No | |
| 2012–2013 | Baku Tech! Bakugan | Shogakukan Music & Digital Entertainment | Yes | No | |
| 2015 | Triage X | Xebec | Yes (Note: Co-directed with Akio Takami) | No | |
| 2016 | Keijo | Xebec | No | Yes | |
| 2017 | Tomica Hyper Rescue Drive Head Kidō Kyūkyū Keisatsu | OLM; Xebec | Yes | No | |
| 2018–2019 | Future Card Buddyfight Ace | OLM; Xebec | Yes | No | |
| 2019–2020 | Zoids Wild Zero | OLM Team Masuda | Yes | No | |
| 2022 | More Than a Married Couple, But Not Lovers | Studio Mother | Yes (Note: Credited as Chief Director (総監督, Sō Kantoku); co-directed with Junichi Yamamoto) | No | |
| 2024 | As a Reincarnated Aristocrat, I'll Use My Appraisal Skill to Rise in the World | Studio Mother | Yes | No | |

=== Films ===
| Year | Title | Studio | Director | Writer | Ref |
|---|---|---|---|---|---|
| 2005 | Rockman EXE Hikari to Yami no Program | Xebec | Yes | No | |
| 2008 | Major: Yūjō no Winning Shot | Xebec | Yes | No | |
| 2018 | Eiga Drive Head: Tomica Hyper Rescue Kidō Kyūkyū Keisatsu | OLM; Xebec | Yes | No | |

=== Original net animation ===
| Year | Title | Studio | Director | Writer | Ref |
|---|---|---|---|---|---|
| 2012 | Upotte!! | Xebec | Yes | No | |
| 2018 | Tomica Hyper Rescue Drive Head Kidō Kyūkyū Keisatsu | OLM; Xebec | Yes | No | |
| 2025 | Koala's Diary | Studio Mother | Yes | No | |

=== Original video animation ===
| Year | Title | Studio | Director | Writer | Ref |
|---|---|---|---|---|---|
| 1990 | Gdleen | Tokyo Laboratory | Yes (Note: Co-directed with Toyoo Ashida) | No | |
| 1994–1995 | Compiler | Animate Film; Studio Fantasia | Yes | Yes | |
| 1994–1995 | Ogre Slayer | OB Planning | Yes | No | |
| 1996–1997 | Sorcerer Hunters | Xebec | Yes | No | |
