= Argevollen =

Japanese anime television series

- Cover of the first Argevollen Blu-ray/DVD volume.

白銀の意思 アルジェヴォルン (Shirogane no Ishi Arujevorun)
- Genre: Action, mecha, science fiction
- Anime television series
- Directed by: Atsushi Ōtsuki
- Produced by: Nobuhiro Nakayama; Jun Fukuda; Tatsuya Ueki; Fuminori Yamazaki; Ken Kawakita; Hideaki Sakaguchi
- Written by: Tatsuo Satō
- Music by: Kōtarō Nakagawa
- Studio: Xebec
- Licensed by: NA: Sentai Filmworks
- Original network: Tokyo MX, MBS, TVA, AT-X, BS11
- Original run: July 3, 2014 – December 18, 2014
- Episodes: 24

Argevollen (Japanese: 白銀の意思 アルジェヴォルン, Hepburn: Shirogane no Ishi Arujevorun; lit. "Silver Will Argevollen") is a Japanese anime television series by Xebec. The series began airing on July 3, 2014. The series was picked up by Crunchyroll for simulcast streaming with English subtitles. The anime has been licensed by Sentai Filmworks.

== Plot ==
The story takes place in a world where two countries, Arandas and Ingelmia, have been warring against each other for a very long time. Tokimune Sumusu, a young man belonging to Independent Unit 8 of Arandas, saves a girl named Jamie when she is attacked by enemy forces. In order to survive, he pilots the new mech Argevollen and fights. The new mech Argevollen is defined by its U-Link system wherein the Argevollen molds to its pilot's mind and cannot be piloted by anyone else. This customization allows the pilot to use it by envisioning in his mind what he wants it to do, rather than physically moving and steering it.

Aircraft cannot be used due to large-scale environmental and geological changes caused by the explosion of strategic weapons (SMMs) used in past wars. The war was still ongoing, centuries after the disaster, which occurred in A.O. (World Calendar) 2015. In addition to existing land weapons, the warring nations use humanoid mobile weapons called "Trail Kriegers". One of these, piloted by Tokimune Susumu, belongs to the independent eighth unit of the "Kingdom of Arandas alliance". Both Alandas and Ingelmia have long histories and corruption in their military. As the war between Arandas and the neighboring "Ingelmia Union" continues, the Great Wall, the fortress of Arandas that has long prevented the invasion of enemy nations, is finally on the verge of falling.

== Characters ==
The cast of Argevollen.

=== Kingdom of Arandas alliance ===
Tokimune Susumu (ススム・トキムネ, Susumu Tokimune)
Voiced by: Ryōta Ōsaka
A young and reckless soldier who becomes the sole pilot of the new Trail Krieger prototype Argevollen. He joined the army and became a Trail Krieger pilot in order to rise through the ranks quickly and find information about the truth behind his sister's death during her time in the military. After finding out the truth about the Argevollen, he decides to continue pilot it, as it is a way of connecting to his sister, despite going berserk when the U-link connection is too deep.
Jamie Hazaford (ジェイミー・ハザフォード, Jeimī Hazafōdo)
Voiced by: Saori Ōnishi
A junior engineer and sole survivor of the Kivernas convoy that was transporting the Argevollen. She maintains the unit for Tokimune and is the only one who knows how to start its operating system, and therefore forced to remain with Independent Unit 8 despite her worries about Tokimune getting herself and her robot into deadly situations. She accidentally overheard the truth about the incident of Reika Nanjou and gets worried each time Tokimune enters a berserk state while piloting, but nonetheless supports his decision and helps him in any way she can.
Ukyō Samonji (サモンジ・ウキョウ, Samonji Ukyō)
Voiced by: Hiroshi Tsuchida
The Commander of the Independent Unit 8. He is a very serious and stoic person who cares a lot about the safety of his squad. He once knew Tokimune's older sister and blames himself for the experiment that took her life. While he clearly dislikes General Cayenne, he agrees on becoming the controlling pilot of the Perphevollen's unmanned units, not wanting the Independent Unit 8 get involved. Despite his attempts, he's not allowed to die, but he ends up destroying the U-Link system, and later he's sent as a representative to the Ingelmian military.
Saori Suzushiro (スズシロ・サオリ, Suzushiro Saori)
Voiced by: Sayaka Ohara
The second in-command of the Independent Unit 8. Unlike Samonji, she's kind and friendly, but she also cares a lot about the squad.
Silfy Appleton (シルフィー･アップルトン, Shirufī Appuruton)
Voiced by: Harumi Sakurai
An experienced mech pilot from the Independent Unit 8, and an expert at holding her liquor.
Lorenz Giuliano (ロレンツ･ジュリアーノ, Rorentsu Juriāno)
Voiced by: Kenji Hamada
Another mech pilot from the Independent Unit 8 who tends to flirt with the girls in the squad.
Chief (ハンチョウ, Hanchō)
Voiced by: Hideaki Tezuka
The head mechanic of the Independent Unit 8.
Akane Sorano (ソラノ・アカネ, Sorano Akane)
Voiced by: Chinatsu Akasaki
One of the mechanics of the Independent Unit 8 that befriends Jamie.
Kaoru Shiono (シオノ・カオル, Shiono Kaoru)
Voiced by: Chinami Hashimoto
Another mechanic of the Independent Unit 8 that befriends Jamie.
Hikaru Rikuru (リクル・ヒカル, Rikuru Hikaru)
Voiced by: Aimi Terakawa
One of the mechanics of the Independent Unit 8 that befriends Jamie.
Akino Terai (テライ・アキノ, Terai Akino)
Voiced by: Ikumi Hayama
Communication Systems operator of the Independent Unit 8.
Seeker (シーカー, Shīkā)
Voiced by: Shinobu Matsumoto
The scout of the Independent Unit 8.
Shouhei Koshikawa (コシカワ・ショウヘイ, Koshikawa Shouhei)
Voiced by: Hiroyuki Yoshino
A soldier of the Independent Unit 8.
Tsubasa Yamanami (ヤマナミ・ツバサ, Yamanami Tsubasa)
Voiced by: Yūsuke Kobayashi
A soldier of the Independent Unit 8.
Kouji Tanita (タニタ・コウジ, Tanita Kōji)
Voiced by: Itaru Yamamoto
Sergeant of the Independent Unit 8.
Masaru Okui (オクイ・マサル, Okui Masaru)
Voiced by: Kazuyuki Okitsu
A soldier of the Independent Unit 8 from the quiet town of Wishpe. His parents died when he was young and he joined Arandas army to get out of Wishpe, but still visits from time to time.
Tsutomu Kutsuwada (クツワダ・ツトム, Kutsuwada Tsutomu)
Voiced by: Takayuki Kondō
A soldier of the Independent Unit 8.
Shizuma Izumi (イズミ・シズマ, Izumi Shizuma)
Voiced by: Susumu Chiba
A Colonel of the Arandas army and an old friend of Samonji.
Namie Portman (ナミエ・ポートマン, Namie Portman)
Voiced by: Maaya Uchida
A girl who is assigned to the Independent Unit 8, as well as bringing the new models ZTK5 Seiran, that used her data during production. She met Tokimune during their time at the military academy.
Toshikazu Cayenne (カイエン・トシカズ, Cayenne Toshikazu)
Voiced by: Rikiya Koyama
A Brigadier general of the Arandas army who is closely involved with the Kybernes company and their higher-ups. He convinces Samonji to join his cause of continue the war using the unmanned Trail Krieger's Perphevollen new units (who were based on the Argevollen's data) and even organizes a rebellion against the military who wanted peace. He's killed by Suzushiro when he tries to execute Samonji for disobeying his orders.
Eraldo Quasimodo (エラルド・クァジモド, Eraldo Quasimodo)
Voiced by: Mitsuru Ogata
A former soldier who retired after Reika Najou's death and an old friend of Samonji and Suzushiro. He investigates Cayenne and Kybernes for Samonji.
Reika Nanjou (ナンジョウ・レイカ, Nanjou Reika)
Voiced by: Yoko Hikasa
Tokimune's older sister, who died several years before the story began. She joined the experiment of Argent Point in order to help create an army where no one died. The control of several units put a great strain on her body, until the units went out of control and she was driven to kill herself, dying while Samonji was trying to get her out of her Trail Krieger. Her data was used in the creation of the Argevollen.

=== The Countries Unification of Ingelmia ===
Schlein Richthofen (シュライン･リヒトフォーヘン, Shurain Rihitofōhen)
Voiced by: Takahiro Sakurai
An ace Trail Krieger pilot of the Ingelmian army who consistently refused promotion multiple times to remain on the front lines. A recurring rival of the Argevollen whose own experience in battle can match the better-equipped prototype. After some time he obtains his own improved version of Trail Krieger, whose speed even surpasses the Argevollen, named Strum Alpha. He now wants a rematch against the Argevollen. He dies once Samonji chooses to destroy the U-Link System. His name referres to Manfred von Richthofen, the Red Baron
Julius Junios (ジュリアス・ユーニオス, Juriasu Yūniosu)
Voiced by: Shō Hayami
The leader of Ingelmia
Arnold Holmes (アーノルド・ホルムス, Arnold Holmes)
Voiced by: Atsushi Ono
A Colonel of the Ingelmian Army, who dislikes the Intelligence branch of the army and only pretends to be under their control. He's later recruited by Rontaul into leading the final invasion to Arandas, supervising the new units Sturm Beta.
Liz Roderick (リーズ・ロデリック, Leeds Roderick)
Voiced by: Satomi Arai
A second lieutenant and a former subordinate of Conrad Daniels, who is later assigned to help Richtofen when he obtains the Sturm Alpha. She simply chooses to watch as Richthofen becomes consumed by the Sturm Alpha.
Bernard Gaap (ベルナルド・ガープ, Bernard Garp)
Voiced by: Tarô Yamaguchi
A Major of the Ingelmian Army and a close subordinate of Arnold Holmes.
Erich Zarl (エーリッヒ・ザール, Erich Saal)
Voiced by: Hideyuki Umezu
A General of the Ingelmian army, who is an acquaintance of Julius Junios. Coming from an old military family, his arrogance and the belief that he was in charge led to his downfall. He was murdered by his old apprentice Rontaul, while already celebrating his victory.
Rontaul (ロンタール, Lontar)
Voiced by: Shintaro Asanuma
A member of the Intelligence branch of the Ingelmian army, who murdered his old teacher Zarl after they had no more use for him. He later recruits Holmes to his cause and also presents him with the new units, named Sturm Beta. He is killed by Gaap when he tries to kill Holmes for refusing to retreat.

== Episode list ==
The series' first opening theme is "Tough Intention" by Kotoko and the first ending theme is "Faith" by Sachika Misawa.

The second opening theme is "ZoNE-iT" by Kotoko and the second ending theme is "Vivid Telepathy" by Nami Tamaki.

No.	Title	Original release date
1	"Encounter" "Sōgū" (Japanese: 遭遇)	July 3, 2014
While the mechanized forces of Ingelmia begin to encroach on the Kingdom of Arandas, the 8th Independent Unit of Arandas is ordered back to their headquarters. Along the way, a civilian convoy is attacked by Ingelmian forces. Tokimune Susumu, a rookie pilot, disobeys orders and tries to rescue the civilians only to get his own Trail Krieger mech destroyed in the process. However, an engineer named Jamie Hazaford jumps out from the passenger's side of the truck and reveals the cargo she was carrying, a brand new robot called the Argevollen. With no other options, Jamie shoves Tokimune in the pilot's seat while his comrades battle with the surrounding enemy forces, and starts up the robot's operating system. Tokimune then manages to use the Argevollen to destroy the remaining enemies.
2	"Awakening" "Mezame" (Japanese: 目覚め)	July 10, 2014
With his Trail Krieger destroyed and no other options immediately available, Tokimune is forced to steer the Argevollen home with the rest of his unit. Jamie tags along to finish delivering the robot to her company, and reveals that the system has been slaved to Tokimune's own body signature so that only he can pilot it. Meanwhile, Tokimune is having difficulty adjusting to the new robot's controls, and Jamie herself isn't completely sure of how they work. As the unit trudges through an abandoned mine, an Ingelmian commander sends a small scouting party to track down the Argevollen. Tokimune is forced to fight them in the mines to buy time for the rest of his unit to escape, when Jamie runs back and tells him that the Argevollen's system is controlled by visualizing the desired goal in his mind. Tokimune and his unit are then able to successfully destroy their attackers with no further casualties.
3	"One Man Army" "Wanman· āmī" (Japanese: ワンマン·アーミー)	July 17, 2014
The 8th Independent Unit finally makes it back to a nearby castle before being told by their superiors they will have to move again to stop the Ingelmian advance and cover the retreat of friendly forces. Commander Samonji devises a plan to collapse the "Gates of No Retreat" by planting many explosives along the canyon walls, while his unit will buy time for Ardanas forces to evacuate the area. Ingelmia sends out a forward team of robots to take down the routing Ardanas forces, led by the skilled Schlein Richthofen. While covering for his allies, Tokimune disobeys orders again and breaks formation to save friendly units trapped within the Gates of No Retreat, but shortly after bailing them out, he finds himself in a duel with Richthofen's robot who uses his experience to match Argevollen's better equipment. Samonji finally orders the Gates sealed, but manages to bail Tokimune out at the last second. The Ingelmia Army is stopped, but Richthofen is shown having escaped the blast as well.
4	"Return" "Kikan" (Japanese: 帰還)	July 24, 2014
The team reaches headquarters for some much needed rest and relaxation. While there, Tokimune is berated by his teammates for constantly disobeying orders and putting them in deadly situations. Jamie begins to show signs of PTSD while in the shower. The army ponders what should be done with the Argevollen, when a representative of the manufacturer informs Jamie that she'll be staying with the army to continue gathering data on robot. Jamie breaks down at the idea of having to put herself back in harm's way, even after the man offers her a raise and promotion. Then he implicitly threatens her livelihood if she chooses to drop out now. Later, Tokimune begs Samonji to punish him for his insubordination, but Samonji declines, stating that he did it for the right reasons.
5	"Surprise Attack" "Kishū" (Japanese: 奇襲)	July 31, 2014
Jamie runs into Tokimune as he plants flowers near his sister's grave, stating that he became a Trail Krieger pilot in hopes that he would quickly rise through the ranks and find the truth behind his sister's death. Jamie composes a message to her company demanding that Tokimune be taken off the Argevollen before he gets himself and the robot killed, but can't bring herself to submit it. The 8th Independent Unit is then sent on another mission to help the Arandas Army's 3rd Cavalry break through an Ingelmian base protected by a row of artillery guns and situated next to a flat plain that makes a frontal assault almost impossible. Samonji comes up with a plan to use multiple flares and trick the enemy into thinking that Arandas units are all over the forest, spreading their counterattack thin and letting Arandas push through in one wedge. Before heading out, Tokimune directly asks Jamie if she loves him, to which she says "no." Finally, on the hour of the operation, Samonji fires off his flare, but finds that none of his allies have fired theirs as the Ingelmian artillery bombards their position.
6	"Run, Jamie!" "Hashire, Jeimī!" (Japanese: 走れ, ジェイミー！)	August 7, 2014
Tokimune awakens to find himself sealed in the Argevollen's cockpit. As Jamie scans the readout, she realizes that the system prioritized protecting its pilot before shutting down, and only a manual reboot of Argevollen's systems will get Tokimune back into the fight, so with nothing more than a helmet and Private Koshikawa's help, she runs through the forest to reach the Argevollen. Meanwhile, Samonji and his team realize the 3rd Cavalry intentionally refused to fire off their flares to turn the 8th Independent Unit into a decoy by default. Samonji returns the favor by firing another flare and illuminating the 3rd Cavalry's position. After surviving a near-miss from an artillery shell and a steep climb up a short cliff, Jamie reaches the Argevollen just as Tokimune begins to panic. She restarts the mech's systems and the 8th Unit successfully captures the enemy base.
7	"Bellhals" "Beruharusu" (Japanese: 陸繋島)	August 14, 2014
The 8th Unit is given unofficial R&R on the neutral island of Bellhals. Jamie has a coupon to a luxurious spa on the island and plans to visit, but is called by her boss at the last minute to update Argevollen's OS. The rest of the women go to the spa, while the men hang out at a local bar. Seeker and Suzushiro watch for any hostile movement while Samonji goes to procure supplies for the unit. Later, Jamie and Tokimune finish updating the Argevollen, but find that all of the attractions on the island are closed. While looking for something to do, they accidentally run into Ingelmian soldiers led by Richthofen, though neither side recognizes the other. Jamie later gets Tokimune to take a picture of her in front of a field of sunflowers, but Tokimune recognizes the background as the same one from his late sister's last photo. Suddenly, Samonji appears right behind him.
8	"Rematch" "Saisen" (Japanese: 再戦)	August 21, 2014
The episode opens with a flashback of Samonji meeting Tokimune's sister in the same sunflower field sometime in the past. In the present, Samonji orders everyone back to the command post. He later receives confirmation from his friend Quasimodo that the reason his supplies were late was due to an Ingelmian sympathizer using the same ship to transfer some unnamed heavy equipment. Thinking that it could be a surprise attack from the coast of Bellhals, Samonji mobilizes his unit's Trail Kreigers. At night, the Argevollen stops a few large trucks from getting into the city, but a trio of Ingelmian Trail Kreigers break cover and start attacking the mechs piloted by Tokimune, Silfy and Lorenz. After a long battle, Richthofen escapes, but one of his comrades is killed and the second is taken prisoner. With the element of surprise gone, the Ingelmian commanders call off their attack.
9	"Promise" "Yakusoku" (Japanese: 約束)	August 28, 2014
Richthofen stops at a bar to meet up with his friend, Major Conrad. As the two reminisce about old times, Conrad reveals that both of them have been ordered to a forward base in Zong to help lead a full-scale assault into the heart of Arandas. Meanwhile, Samonji informs the 8th Unit that they have been ordered to quickly strike the Ingelmian base at Zong to blunt the invasion before it starts. As Conrad arrives to inspect the base with his XO, Arandas forces bombard the base with portable artillery and rocket fire, then lay booby traps to kill any Ingelmian counterattack. As the 8th Unit's Trail Kriegers move in to finish off the base, Conrad hops into his own mech and manages to hold off the Argevollen just long enough for the surviving Ingelmian troops to retreat before Tokimune stabs him with his own knife. Richthofen is shown returning to the same bar and ordering two glasses in honor of his dead friend.
10	"End of Absence" "Fuzai no hate" (Japanese: 不在の果て)	September 4, 2014
Samonji and Suzushiro are both recalled to headquarters while the rest of the 8th Unit heads to Wishpe for some R&R, which happens to be Okui's hometown. The 8th Unit only gets a little rest before a mechanized Ingelmian party begins moving towards the town. With their normal command staff MIA and the next ranking NCO sick with food poisoning, command of the 8th Unit ends up falling to Okui. Okui manages to organize an evacuation of the civilians from Wishpe, but due to his inexperience, Lorenz and Silfy run their Trail Kriegers right into enemy units. Meanwhile, the Argevollen is still under repairs. As the unique design makes it impossible to simply borrow parts from other mechs, the engineers decide to jury-rig a solution while Silfy and Tokimune hold out as long as they can. Eventually, Okui orders a retreat as the Argevollen is finally activated. The 8th Unit escapes Wishpe and blows up the bridge behind them, nearly taking Tokimune with it.
11	"Rage" "Ken" (Japanese: 拳)	September 11, 2014
As the 8th Unit heads back to headquarters, Brigadier General Cowen of the Arandas Army nonchalantly informs Samonji that Arandas is slowly losing the war, Tokimune is the younger brother of his late subordinate Reika, and that the Argevollen was originally meant for his own use. After Jamie asks Tokimune several increasingly uncomfortable questions, the 8th Unit celebrates their recent successes at a local pub. Samonji talks to Tokimune alone, blaming himself for allowing Reika's death during a secret military experiment that he observed. Tokimune then beats up an unresisting Samonji until his comrades restrain him and confine him to quarters. Later, Suzushiro begins to tell Tokimune about the circumstances of Reika's death.
12	"Reika Nanjou" (Japanese: ナンジョウ・レイカ)	September 18, 2014
Suzushiro tells Tokimune about the events behind his sister's death at Argent Point. At the time, Samonji was a Second Lieutenant and the leader of the base's security force which included herself and Quasimodo. Reika was a Sub-Lieutenant and the pilot for a new Trail Krieger that could use its pilot's brain to control unmanned mechs in the field. Reika saw this as part of her dream to fight a war where no human would die, even though the act put immense strain on her mind and body. Despite his first impression, Samonji slowly warmed up to Reika, and shared coffee with her. One day, Reika was set to test with six unmanned Trail Kriegers in front of high-level Arandas Army officers, but lost control as the unmanned mechs shot up the base. Samonji, Suzushiro and Quasimodo tried to save Reika, but the unmanned mechs were too strong. Reika instead used the last of her strength to order the unmanned mechs to shoot at her own Trail Krieger, shutting down the experiment and killing her soon after. In the present, Jamie overhears the story nearby as Tokimune pounds on the walls of his cell in anger. Colonel Izumi informs Samonji that new Trail Kriegers and personnel are being transferred to the 8th Unit, and Suzushiro visits Reika's grave with a cup of coffee.
13	"Blue and Indigo" "Ao to ai" (Japanese: 青と藍)	October 2, 2014
Private Namie Portman arrives at the outpost where Independent Unit 8 is doing training exercises. Along with her arrival come multiple Trail Kriegers of a new model known as the ZTK5 Seiran, for which she provided testing data during production. Namie joins Silfy, Lorenz and Tokimune as they run a mock battle for the Seiran, but Namie's inexperience leads her to be easily defeated by Silfy. Sometime later, the 8th Unit is mobilized to attack a nearby Ingelmian encampment. All four Trail Krieger pilots blitz the enemy and swiftly destroy several enemy Trail Kriegers before they can mobilize, but after saving Tokimune, Namie is blindsided by an enemy Trail Krieger. Tokimune rushes in to save her, plowing through the enemy to stab the offending mech with a brand new sword after Namie unsuccessfully tries to free herself. After the battle, Jamie notices that Tokimune's linkage rate with Argevollen spiked over 70% near the end.
14	"Ghost" "Bōrei" (Japanese: 亡霊)	October 9, 2014
Several remote Arandas Army bases have been completely wiped out by what Suzushiro refers to as a ghost, as there were no witnesses left alive to detail the new threat. Independent Unit 8 has been ordered to the base at Kitazamahara to help defend the base from this new threat. Elsewhere, the schism between the Ingelmian Army officers and the Intelligence Division widens as both sides are racing to acquire newer Trail Krieger models. Sometime later, the Kitazamahara base comes under attack from a single Trail Krieger. The unknown mech single-handedly blows through the entire Arandas defense and kills the Major in charge of the base. Tokimune catches up with the unknown Trail Krieger, but is barely able to hold it off until Silfy manages to land a couple shots from behind. The mech then retreats from the battlefield. Later, the Trail Krieger opens up to reveal that Richthofen was the pilot of the new unit, called the Sturm Alpha. Elsewhere, several businessmen plot to mass produce new Trail Krieger models and sell them to both sides before flaws with the "RA System" are noticed.
15	"Sturm" "Arashi" (Japanese: 嵐)	October 16, 2014
16	"Freeze" "Tōketsu" (Japanese: 凍結)	October 23, 2014
17	"Defeat" "Haiboku" (Japanese: 敗北)	October 30, 2014
18	"Farewell" "Ketsubetsu" (Japanese: 訣別)	November 6, 2014
19	"Resolve" "Ketsui" (Japanese: 決意)	November 13, 2014
20	"Another Mind" "Mō hitotsu no ishiki" (Japanese: もうひとつの意識)	November 20, 2014
21	"Disturbance" "Dōran" (Japanese: 動乱)	November 27, 2014
22	"Capture" "Rokaku" (Japanese: 鹵獲)	December 4, 2014
23	"Counterattack" "Hangeki" (Japanese: 反撃)	December 11, 2014
24	"Silver Will" "Shirogane no ishi" (Japanese: 白銀の意思)	December 18, 2014
