= Softenni =

Japanese manga and its adaptation(s)

- Cover of the first manga volume

そふてにっ (Sofuteni)
- Genre: Comedy, Sports
- Manga
- Written by: Ryō Azuchi
- Published by: Mag Garden
- Magazine: Monthly Comic Blade
- Original run: 2008 – 2011
- Volumes: 8
- Anime television series
- Directed by: Ryouki Kamitsubo
- Produced by: Takatoshi Chino; Nobuhiro Nakayama; Katsumi Koike; Satoshi Fujita; Ryōsuke Naya; Jun Fukuda
- Written by: Ryouki Kamitsubo
- Music by: Akito Matsuda (Note: Credited as his stage name, Nijine.)
- Studio: Xebec
- Licensed by: NA: Sentai Filmworks
- Original network: AT-X, Tokyo MX
- Original run: April 8, 2011 – June 24, 2011
- Episodes: 12

Softenni (そふてにっ, Sofuteni) is a Japanese manga written and illustrated by Ryō Azuchi. Beginning serialization in Mag Garden's Comic Blade in 2008, Softenni consists of eight volumes. An anime adaptation by Xebec aired on April 7, 2011, on Tokyo MX and finished on June 24, 2011.

== Plot ==
The series follows Shiratama Middle School student Asuna Harukaze and her teammates, who are all members of their school's soft tennis club. Their team is intent on winning the soft tennis national championship but must also deal with the trials, twists and turns of their comedic, adventurous school life.

== Characters ==
Asuna Harukaze (春風 明日菜, Harukaze Asuna)
Voiced by: Kanae Itō
The main protagonist of the series. She is quite enthusiastic about tennis to the point she will sometimes swing around objects (including a pitchfork, much to her mother's chagrin). She has a bad habit of misunderstanding certain comments made by others, normally taking them as sexual innuendos. Asuna has terrible luck with the tennis court's white lines and continually trips over them as a gag. She joined the team in order to achieve the perfect woman's body and occasionally pictures herself as a much older, lewder woman.
Kotone Sawanatsu (沢夏 琴音, Sawanatsu Kotone)
Voiced by: Eri Kitamura
A headstrong girl who appears to be the most ambitious one of the group. She dreams big when it comes to the sport of tennis. Kotone has a crush on Mishimagi and tends to compete with Elizabeth when it comes to his affections. Her biggest dream is to play soft tennis at Wimbledon; unfortunately, she does not know soft tennis is not included in the Wimbledon tournaments.
Chitose Akiyama (秋山 千歳, Akiyama Chitose)
Voiced by: Shizuka Itō
A very busty girl with a penchant for gluttony and the current captain of the club. She has been hungry enough to attempt eating an endangered species (i.e., a Japanese giant salamander). She even fantasizes about things that can be eaten as food. In spite of being team captain, Chitose is a poor tennis player. This weakness is overcome whenever she envisions the ball as something edible. She is rather smart and calculating (though her calculations are usually slightly off) and occasionally comes up with unorthodox methods of playing the game (playing with a net-sized racket for instance). However, she is very passionate about soft tennis (almost to the point of being frightening) and loves to see her teammates compete.
Elizabeth Warren (エリザベス・ウォーレン, Erizabesu Wōren)
Voiced by: Sayuri Yahagi
An English transfer student. She met Mishimagi a few years before her transfer to Asuna's school and developed a crush on him. She does not have a great Japanese vocabulary, so she may sometimes say certain words in English. Elizabeth seems to get along with Kurusu.
Kurusu Fuyukawa (冬川 来栖, Fuyukawa Kurusu)
Voiced by: Satomi Akesaka
A stoic and rather emotionless girl who speaks in a monotone and has a habit of wearing animal costumes. Despite her cosplay fetish Kurusu is one of the best players on the team.
Yayoi Hiragishi/Uzuki Hiragishi (平岸 やよい/平岸 うづき, Hiragishi Yayoi/Hiragishi Uzuki)
Voiced by: Haruka Tomatsu
The newest member of the team. Yayoi is a shy girl with a strong spiritual sense. When playing she can be possessed by the spirit of her dead sister Uzuki, a self proclaimed soft tennis genius. Uzuki's personality is the complete opposite of Yayoi's, possessing arrogance, aggressiveness, and sadistic inclinations. While Uzuki is an excellent tennis player, she can only retain control of Yayoi for short periods of time.
Hiroshi Mishimagi (三島木 洋, Mishimagi Hiroshi)
Voiced by: Shinobu Matsumoto
Nicknamed Mishi (ミッシー) by the girls, Hiroshi is the coach of the Shiratama Soft Tennis team and a former national champion. While he may be rather lazy and a bit of a drunkard (as depicted when he drank a lot with the vice principal), he deeply cares for each of the girls and wish nothing more than to see them succeed. He also seems to have a fear of spirits as seen when he would go to a church or Shinto shrine after he sees Yayoi speaking with spirits.
Leo Amachi (天地 玲緒, Amachi Reo)
Voiced by: Miyuki Sawashiro
The manager of Akadama Middle School Soft Tennis Club. Leo has an obsession of providing massage services to his team members although his massages cause sexual arousal for the girls. He has a little fetish for cross-dressing, usually going by the name Leona Tenchi while in drag, and seems to have a crush on Asuna.
Sumino Kiba (木場 澄乃, Kiba Sumino)
Voiced by: Marina Inoue
The captain of Akadama Middle School Soft Tennis Club. She is exactly the same as Kotone in terms of personality. As a result the pair have developed a friendly rivalry.
Misaki Shidou (獅童 岬, Shidō Misaki)
Voiced by: Minako Kotobuki
The current national champion. Despite her cool appearance Misaki has a child-like love of cats, especially Nyantaro. Her training methods are extreme and very brutal, which the other girls soon discovered. Despite her skills and title, Misaki seems slightly self-conscious about her body, exclaiming "There's something to grab!" when Asuna accidentally grabs her chest and notes that there is not much there. She sometimes ends up in compromising positions, which her assistant Yura always manages to record.
Yura Hiratsuka (平塚 由良, Hiratsuka Yura)
Voiced by: Aki Toyosaki
She was assigned to spy on the Shiratama Middle School Soft Tennis team by Misaki Shidou. Instead of getting their information, she 'enjoyed' her stay with them and indulged her obsession of taking 'sadistic' photos for her own masochist satisfaction. She seems to be somewhat obsessed with taking lewd photos and videos of her captain.
Shiki Nishioka (西岡 紫希, Nishioka Shiki)
Voiced by: Ayahi Takagaki
The former captain of the Soft Tennis Club who is currently in high school. She is also Mishimagi's cousin.

== Media ==
The original manga by Ryō Azuchi began serialization in Mag Garden's Monthly Comic Blade magazine from 2008. The series will be added to legal manga reading site JManga on June 5, 2012.

=== Anime ===
An anime television series was announced in December 2010 in Comic Blade and confirmed to begin the following spring, with 12 episodes. It aired on Tokyo MX on April 7, 2011, and finished on June 24, 2011. It is produced by Xebec, with character designs by Yūichi Oka, Yoshikazu Iwanami as sound director, and Ryouki Kamitsubo as director. Two songs are used for the opening and ending themes of the anime, "Rulebook o Wasurechae" (るーるぶっくを忘れちゃえ) by Ultra-Prism with Shiratama-chū Soft Tennis Club, and "Tsumasakidachi" (つまさきだち) by Kanae Itō respectively. The anime has been licensed in North America by Sentai Filmworks for digital and home video distribution.

No.	Title	Original release date
1	"Morning Practice!" "Asaren" (あされんっ)	April 8, 2011
Asuna wakes up bright and early to start a new day, her mind firmly set on tennis. Joined by her friend Kotone for practice before school. The two of them meet up at the tennis court and there they find non other than their coach, Misshi.
2	"Blond Hair!" "Patsukin" (ぱつきんっ)	April 15, 2011
3	"Intense" "Mōretsu" (もーれつっ)	April 22, 2011
4	"Going Out" "Odekake" (おでかけっ)	April 29, 2011
5	"Again" "Sairai" (さいらいっ)	May 6, 2011
6	"Two Pair" "Tsū Pea" (つーぺあっ)	May 13, 2011
7	"Ambush" "Senpuku" (せんぷくっ)	May 20, 2011
8	"The Top!" "Teppen" (てっぺんっ)	May 27, 2011
9	"For a While!" "Hitomazu" (ひとまずっ)	June 3, 2011
10	"Freshman Reception!" "Shinkan" (しんかんっ)	June 10, 2011
11	"Trip!" "Torippu" (とりっぷっ)	June 17, 2011
12	"Return!" "Ritān" (りたーんっ)	June 24, 2011
