= Shōwa Monogatari =

Japanese anime television series

- DVD box set cover

昭和物語
- Genre: Drama
- Anime film
- Directed by: Masahiro Murakami
- Produced by: Masahiro Murakami; Hiroaki Takeuchi; Song Meishan
- Written by: Miho Maruo; Naruhisa Arakawa; Sukehiro Tomita; Yasushi Hirano
- Music by: Gido Hayashi
- Studio: Wao World
- Released: January 29, 2011
- Runtime: 100 minutes
- Anime television series
- Directed by: Masahiro Murakami; Mitsuhiro Tōgō (#1–4); Hiroshi Kugimiya (#5–13); Assistant director: Kenichi Ishikura
- Produced by: Masahiro Murakami; Hiroaki Takeuchi; Song Meishan
- Written by: Yasushi Hirano
- Music by: Gido Hayashi
- Studio: Wao World
- Original network: Chiba TV, KBS Kyoto, Mie TV, Sun TV, TV Kanagawa, TV Saitama
- Original run: April 4, 2011 – June 26, 2011
- Episodes: 13

Shōwa Monogatari (昭和物語; trans. Shōwa Era Story) is a 2011 Japanese anime film and television series about the Yamazaki family, who live in Tokyo during Shōwa 39 (1964), the same year Tokyo hosted the 1964 Summer Olympics. The film, directed by Masahiro Murakami, was released in Japan on January 29, 2011. The series had its broadcast run between April and July 2011.

== Episode list ==
No.	Title	Original release date
1	"New Years Day, Shōwa 39" "Shōwa San-Jū-Kyū Nen Gantan" (昭和三十九年元旦)	April 4, 2011
2	"Taichi's Broken Heart at Twenty" "Hatachi, Taichi no Shitsuren" (二十歳・太一の失恋)	April 11, 2011
3	"A Crazy Adventure" "Kureijī na Dai-Bōken" (クレイジーな大冒険)	April 18, 2011
4	"Come Spring" "Haru yo Koi" (春よ来い)	April 15, 2011
5	"Pocket Money and Playing Catch" "Kozukai to Kyacchibōru" (小遣いとキャッチボール)	May 2, 2011
6	"Worst Children's Day!" "Saiaku na Kodomo no Hi!" (最悪な子供の日!)	May 9, 2011
7	"Yureru Koi to Pūrusaido" "Yureru Koi to Pūrusaido" (ゆれる恋とプールサイド)	May 16, 2011
8	"Divorce Defense" "Rikon Bōei-gun" (離婚防衛軍)	May 30, 2011
9	"Grandpa's Ghost?" "Jī-chan no Yūrei!?" (爺ちゃんの幽霊!?)	June 6, 2011
10	"Summer's End" "Natsuyasumi no Owari" (夏休みの終わり)	June 13, 2011
11	"Toots's Starry Sky" "Nē-chan no Hoshizora" (ねえちゃんの星空)	June 20, 2011
12	"Tears of Autumn, Day of Parting" "Akikaze ga Naita, Wakare no Hi" (秋風が泣いた、別れの日)	June 27, 2011
13	"Our Olympics" "Boku-tachi no Orinpikku" (ボクたちのオリンピック)	July 4, 2011
