= Hen Semi =

Japanese manga series

- First tankōbon volume cover

変ゼミ
- Genre: Comedy
- Manga
- Written by: TAGRO
- Published by: Kodansha
- Magazine: Monthly Morning Two
- Original run: December 21, 2006 – June 22, 2015
- Volumes: 11
- Original video animation
- Directed by: Ryouki Kamitsubo
- Produced by: Yūichi Yamada; Fumitake Kobayashi
- Written by: Takamitsu Kōno
- Music by: Kei Haneoka
- Studio: Xebec
- Released: July 23, 2010 – March 23, 2011
- Episodes: 2
- Anime television series
- Directed by: Takao Kato
- Produced by: Yūichi Yamada; Gō Nakanishi
- Written by: Takamitsu Kōno
- Music by: Masaru Yokoyama
- Studio: Xebec
- Original network: MBS, AT-X, BS11 Digital, Tokyo MX
- Original run: April 3, 2011 – July 3, 2011
- Episodes: 13
- icon

Hen Semi (Japanese: 変ゼミ, Hepburn: Hen Zemi), also known as Abnormal Physiology Seminar, is a Japanese comedy manga series written and illustrated by TAGRO and is a remake of his earlier manga series, Hentai Seiri Seminar (変態生理ゼミナール, "Abnormal Physiology Seminar"). Hen Semi has been serialized in Kodansha's Monthly Morning Two manga magazine since 2006. It has been adapted into an original video animation in 2010, as well as an anime television series in 2011.

== Plot ==
Nanako falls in love with Komugi and she joins a seminar which he enrolls, but the seminar is an abnormal seminar. Sexual harassment-like assignments and eccentric classmates confuse her.

== Characters ==
Nanako Matsutaka (松隆 奈々子, Matsutaka Nanako)
Voiced by: Kana Hanazawa
Nanako is a normal university student, who happened to enroll in Abnormal Physiology Seminar. She tries to keep her mental state sound, but other abnormal classmates start to influence her personality...
Komugi Musashi (武蔵 小麦, Musashi Komugi)
Voiced by: Akira Ishida
Nanako has a crush on him. He is a handsome young man, and also a very straightforward person who is not afraid to discuss his perversions, much to the displeasure of others nearby. He also has a Netorare fetish.
Miwako Mizukoshi (水越 美和子, Mizukoshi Miwako)
Voiced by: Yukiko Takaguchi
Komugi's ex-girlfriend. She is a beautiful woman, but also a masochist and often gets lost in wild sexual fantasies.
Anna Katō (加藤 あんな, Katō Anna)
Voiced by: Ryōko Shintani
A new student from Kanazawa, Ishikawa. She looks like a delinquent, but actually has a split personality. She was originally a sadist to her little brother.
Yesterday Taguchi (田口 イエスタディ, Taguchi Iesutadi)
Voiced by: Minoru Shiraishi
A dissolute student who wants to be a manga artist. He is in a codependency relation with Makiko.
Makiko Gregory (蒔子＝グレゴリー, Makiko Guregorī)
Voiced by: Shiho Kawaragi
An elusive blonde student who is half British and half Japanese. She is an assistant of Yesterday.
Hishiyasu Ichikawa (市河 菱靖, Ichikawa Hishiyasu)
Voiced by: Norihisa Mori
A punk rock and otaku style student who films other people's perversions. He is also a mysophobe.
Kenji Meshiya (飯野 堅治, Meshiya Kenji)
Voiced by: Takashi Matsuyama
The seminar's professor. He looks like Kenji Eno.
Yūji Horii (堀井 幽璽, Horii Yūji)
Voiced by: Kenjiro Tsuda
Kenji's senpai who sometimes asks him for money despite being a wealthy man. He is famous for having developed an eroge. He looks like Yuji Horii. Miwako later dates him.

== Media ==
=== Manga ===
Hentai Seiri Seminar appeared serially in 5 episodes in Wanimagazine's hentai manga magazine Comic Kairakuten, and it was contained on a collection of TAGRO's short stories in 2004 by Daitosha. Hen Semi was first serialized in Kondansha's seinen manga magazine Morning 2 in 2006. As of August 2011, 5 volumes have been released.

=== Original video animation ===
The first volume was released with the limited edition of volume four of the manga on July 23, 2010; and the second volume was released with the limited edition of volume five of the manga on March 23, 2011. The opening theme is "Maniaekirakira (マニアエキラキラ)" by Nobuhiro Makino (composition and arrangement), Hitomi Mieno (lyrics), and Kana Hanazawa (vocals) and the ending theme is "Hen Rin Shan; Hen da yo. Rinsū no Ato ni Shanpū te (変・リン・シャン 〜変だよ。リンスーの後にシャンプーて〜; "Hen Rin Sham; It's abnormal to shampoo after rinse")" by Ataru Sumiyoshi (composition and arrangement), Hitomi Mieno (lyrics), and Kana Hanazawa, Minoru Shiraishi, Norihisa Mori, Takashi Matsuyama (vocals).

=== Anime television series ===
In December 2010, an anime television series adaptation of Hen Semi was announced on Kodansha's website. Produced by Xebec under the direction of Takao Kato and scripts by Takamitsu Kōno, the series began its broadcast between April 3 to July 3, 2011, on MBS. The duration of the episodes is half of that of a regular anime episode: 12 minutes instead of 24 minutes.

The opening theme is a non-lyric song "Hen Zemi Hajimaru yo! (変ゼミ始まるよ!; "Hen Semi Will Start!")" by Masaru Yokoyama and the ending theme is "Punctuation!" by Hajime Kikuchi (composition and arrangement), Hitomi Mieno (lyrics), and Kana Hanazawa (vocals).

| No. | Title | Original release date |
|---|---|---|
| 1 | "Study on the World Events as Seen from Unbiased Advocates"; Transliteration: "Fuhen-ron-sha-tachi Kara Mita Sekai no Jishō ni Kansuru Kōsatsu" (Japanese: 不偏論者たちから見た世界の事象に関する考察) | April 3, 2011 |
| 2 | "Study on the Hedonistic Aspects of Food and Taste"; Transliteration: "Shoku to Shikō kara Miru Kairaku Yōsō ni Kansuru Kōsatsu" (Japanese: 食と嗜好から見る快楽様相に関する考察) | April 17, 2011 |
| 3 | "Study on the Sense of Virtue in Social Comparison"; Transliteration: "Shakai-teki Hikaku ni okeru Teisō Kannen ni Kansuru Kōsatsu" (Japanese: 社会的比較における貞操観念に関する考察) | April 25, 2011 |
| 4 | "Study on the Difference in Happiness and that of the Person Receiving the Service to the Population"; Transliteration: "Shūdan e no Hōshi-sha to Sore o Juyōsuru Gawa no Kōfuku-kan no Sai ni Kansuru Kōsatsu" (Japanese: 集団への奉仕者とそれを受容する側の幸福感の差異に関する考察) | May 1, 2011 |
| 5 | "Study on the Family Dynamics that Influence Personality Development"; Transliteration: "Kazoku Kinō ga Jinkaku Keisei ni Ataeru Eikyō ni Kansuru Kōsatsu" (Japanese: 家族機能が人格形成に与える影響に関する考察) | May 8, 2011 |
| 6 | "Study on the Impulsive Action and Threatened Action in Extreme Conditions"; Transliteration: "Kyokugen Jōtai ni Okeru Shōdō Kōi to Kyōhaku Kōi ni Kansuru Kōsatsu" (Japanese: 極限状態における衝動行為と脅迫行為に関する考察) | May 15, 2011 |
| 7 | "Study on the Relationship Between Direct and Reliable to Depend on the Specific Relationship"; Transliteration: "Tokutei no Ningen Kankei e Mukeru Izon-sei to Shinrai-sei no Kankei ni Kansuru Kōsatsu" (Japanese: 特定の人間関係へ向ける依存性と信頼性の関係に関する考察) | May 22, 2011 |
| 8 | "Study on the Characteristic Quality and the Sense of Self-growth by Childhood Experiences"; Transliteration: "Yōji Taiken ga Ataeru Tokushitsu-teki Seishitsu to Jiko Seichō-kan ni Kansuru Kōsatsu" (Japanese: 幼児体験が与える特質的性質と自己成長感に関する考察) | May 28, 2011 |
| 9 | "Study on the Self-observation and Self-disclosure Subjective"; Transliteration: "Shukan-teki Jiko Kansatsu no Kekka to Jiko Kaiji ni Kansuru Kōsatsu" (Japanese: 主観的自己観察の結果と自己開示に関する考察) | June 5, 2011 |
| 10 | "Study on the Psychological Impact of Indirect Contact"; Transliteration: "Kansetsu-teki na Sesshoku ni Yoru Shinri-teki Eikyō ni Kansuru Kōsatsu" (Japanese: 間接的な接触による心理的影響に関する考察) | June 12, 2011 |
| 11 | "Study on the Psychological and Physical Effects of Suppressed Desires"; Transliteration: "Yokuseisareta Yokkyū ga Oyobosu Shinri-teki Oyobi Shintai-teki Kōka ni Kansuru Kōsatsu" (Japanese: 抑制された欲求が及ぼす心理的及び身体的効果に関する考察) | June 19, 2011 |
| 12 | "Study on Coping With a Particular Expression of Love From Someone"; Transliteration: "Tokutei no Jinbutsu kara no Aijō Hyōgen e no Taisho Kōdō ni Kansuru Kōsatsu" (Japanese: 特定の人物からの愛情表現への対処行動に関する考察) | June 26, 2011 |
| 13 | "Study on Impartial Advocates Harbouring 'Love'"; Transliteration: "Fuhen-ron-sha-tachi ga Idaku “Ai” ni Kansuru Kōsatsu" (Japanese: 不偏論者たちが抱く｢愛｣に関する考察) | July 3, 2011 |

== Internet radio show ==
A weekly internet radio show titled Hen Lab (変ラボ, Hen Rabo) began airing on March 15, 2011, on Animate TV. It is co-hosted by Minoru Shiraishi, Norihisa Mori and Takashi Matsuyama.
