= Xebec (studio) =

Japanese animation studio

Xebec, Inc.
- Native name: 株式会社ジーベック
- Romanized name: Kabushiki-gaisha Jībekku
- Type: Kabushiki gaisha
- Industry: Japanese animation
- Founded: May 1, 1995; 31 years ago
- Defunct: May 31, 2019; 7 years ago
- Fate: Xebec: Sold to Sunrise and Production I.G in 2019. (Note: Sunrise took over most of Xebec's assets, which included the building which the studio operated. In its place, Sunrise established a new subsidiary, Sunrise Beyond, which retains a number of former Xebec staff, including former Xebec CEO Nobuyoshi Habara, who is one of Sunrise Beyond's board members. Xebec's Fukuoka Studio was rebranded to Sunrise Beyond Fukuoka (and later BFN Fukuoka), and a few other assets remained under Production I.G.); Xebec M2: Went defunct in 2009. (Note: The Xebec M2 substudio was dissolved following the departure of its representative director, Hideyuki Motohashi, in 2009.); Xebec Zwei: Sold to Production I.G in 2019. (Note: Xebec Zwei was a part of the assets that Xebec owned which were given to Production I.G after its dissolution, and its name was subsequently changed to I.G. Zwei.)
- Successor: Xebec: Sunrise Beyond; Studio Mother (Note: Former Xebec CEO Yukinao Shimoji founded Studio Mother in 2019 after Xebec's dissolution.); Xebec Zwei: I.G. Zwei
- Headquarters: 3-22-31 Minami-cho, Kokubunji, Tokyo, Japan 〒 185-0021 Southern Building 5F
- Key people: Xebec: Tooru Satou (Note: President and CEO, 1995~2005.); Yukinao Shimoji (Note: President and CEO, 2005~May 2013. Chairman of the board, May 2013–February 2019.); Ryuuji Mitsumoto (Note: Executive vice president, May 2013–February 2019.); Nobuyoshi Habara (Note: President and CEO, May 2018–February 2019.); Mitsuhisa Ishikawa (Note: President and CEO, March 2019–May 2019.); Xebec M2: Hideyuki Motohashi (Note: President and CEO.)
- Total equity: ¥10,000,000
- Owner: Production I.G (1995–2007); IG Port (2007–2019)
- Number of employees: 100
- Divisions: Photography Dept. (Note: Xebec Photography Department (XEBEC撮影部), the studio's in-house compositing division.); Fukuoka Studio (2018–2019)
- Subsidiaries: Triple A (2002–2005); Xebec M2 (2003–2009); Xebec Zwei (2010–2019)
- Website: www.production-ig.co.jp/xebec/

Xebec, Inc. (Japanese: 株式会社ジーベック, Hepburn: Kabushiki-gaisha Jībekku; stylized in all caps) was a Japanese animation studio based in Kokubunji, Tokyo, founded by former Tatsunoko Production animators on May 1, 1995. They worked on the anime series, such as Nadesico, Love Hina, D.N.Angel, Keijo, Shaman King, Fafner, To Love Ru, and Space Battleship Yamato remakes (2199 and 2202).

The company logotype includes the International Phonetic Alphabet transcription [zíːbek], which represents not the Japanese pronunciation using syllabification for Hepburn romanization but rather a presumed "English" pronunciation.

== Closure ==
On November 20, 2018, Xebec's parent company, IG Port, sold the studio to Sunrise after constant deficits that the subsidiary had in different years.

On January 12, 2019, Xebec Zwei, a subsidiary of Xebec, was transferred to Production I.G, becoming a subsidiary and changing its name to IG Zwei accordingly.

On March 5, 2019, Sunrise announced that they established a new company, Sunrise Beyond, at Xebec's address, with Xebec's operations being transferred to it.

Xebec ceased to exist as a business entity on May 31, 2019. Its post-production teams, which were not part of the sale to Sunrise, were broken up and consolidated into several IG Port companies, but Production I.G inherited the company's assets. Copyright of Xebec's past works reverted to the IG Port group as a whole.

== Works ==
=== Television series ===
- Sorcerer Hunters (1995–1996)
- Martian Successor Nadesico (1996–1997)
- Bakusō Kyōdai Let's & Go!! (1996–1998)
- Super Yo-Yo (1998–1999)
- Steam Detectives (1998–1999)
- Shogun Recuts (1998–2000)
- Burst Ball Barrage!! Super B-Daman (1999)
- Dai-Guard (1999–2000)
- Zoids: Chaotic Century (1999–2000)
- Love Hina (2000)
- Pilot Candidate (2000)
- Tales of Eternia: The Animation (2001)
- Zoids: New Century (2001)
- Shaman King (2001–2002)
- Ground Defense Force! Mao-chan (2002)
- Rockman.EXE (2002–2006)
- Bottle Fairy (2003)
- D.N.Angel (2003)
- Stellvia (2003)
- Fafner in the Azure (2004)
- D.I.C.E. (2005)
- Elemental Gelade (2005)
- Petopeto-san (2005; XEBEC M2)
- Negima! Magister Negi Magi (2005)
- Saru Get You -On Air- (2006)
- The Third (2006)
- Buso Renkin (2006–2007)
- Shooting Star Rockman (2006–2008)
- Heroic Age (2007)
- Over Drive (2007)
- Hitohira (2007; XEBEC M2)
- Zombie-Loan (2007; XEBEC M2)
- Mnemosyne (2008)
- To Love Ru (2008)
- Kanokon (2008)
- Kyō no Go no Ni (2008)
- Pandora Hearts (2009)
- Ladies versus Butlers! (2010)
- MM! (2010)
- Motto To Love Ru (2010)
- Hanakappa (2010–2019; taken over from Group TAC with OLM)
- Rio: Rainbow Gate! (2011)
- Hen Semi (2011)
- Softenni (2011)
- Lagrange: The Flower of Rin-ne (2012)
- Star Blazers: Space Battleship Yamato 2199 (2012–2013; with AIC on episodes 1–10)
- Nyaruko: Crawling with Love (2012)
- Upotte!! (2012)
- To Love Ru Darkness (2012)
- Haiyore! Nyaruko-san W (2013)
- Pokémon Origins (2013; episodes 2–3)
- Future Card Buddyfight (2014–2015; with OLM)
- Maken-ki! Tsū (2014)
- Broken Blade TV (2014; with Production I.G)
- Argevollen (2014)
- Tokyo ESP (2014)
- Fafner in the Azure: -EXODUS- (2015; XEBECzwei)
- Triage X (2015)
- Future Card Buddyfight 100 (2015–2016; with OLM)
- To Love Ru Darkness 2nd (2015)
- Future Card Buddyfight Triple D (2016–2017; with OLM)
- Keijo!!!!!!!!! (2016)
- BanG Dream! (2017; with ISSEN)
- Future Card Buddyfight X (2017–2018; with OLM)
- Clockwork Planet (2017)
- Tomica Hyper Rescue Drive Head Kidō Kyūkyū Keisatsu (2017; with OLM)
- Future Card Buddyfight X: All-Star Fight (2018; with OLM)
- Full Metal Panic! Invisible Victory (2018)
- Future Card Buddyfight Ace (2018–2019; with OLM)
- Yuuna and the Haunted Hot Springs (2018)
- Space Battleship Yamato 2202 (2018–2019)
- Fafner in the Azure: The Beyond (2019; XEBECzwei; Note: Zwei was transferred over to Production I.G before production was complete)

=== Original video animation ===
- Sorcerer Hunters (1996–1997)
- Blue Seed Beyond (1998, episode 3)
- Gekiganger III (1998)
- Love Hina: Christmas Special (2000)
- Love Hina: Spring Special (2001)
- Love Hina Again (2002)
- Special Curriculum: The Candidate for Goddess (2002)
- Mahō Sensei Negima! Introduction Film (2004–2005)
- Majokko Tsukune-chan (2005–2006)
- Fafner in the Azure: Right of Left (2005)
- Petit Eva: Evangelion@School (2007; episodes 10–24)
- To Love Ru (2009–2010)
- Kanokon: Manatsu no Daishanikusai (2009)
- Kyō no Go no Ni (2009)
- Pandora Hearts Omake (2009–2010)
- Hen Semi (2010–2011)
- Rinne no Lagrange: Kamogawa Days (2012)
- To Love Ru Darkness (2012–2015)
- Maken-ki! (2013)
- Haiyore! Nyaruko-san F (2015)
- Triage X (2015)
- Fantasista Stella (2015)
- To Love Ru Darkness 2nd (2016–2017)
- Black Clover (2017; XEBECzwei)
- BanG Dream! (2017)
- Yuuna and the Haunted Hot Springs (2018)
- Tomica Hyper Rescue Drive Head Kidō Kyūkyū Keisatsu (2018; with OLM)

=== Films ===
- Let's & Go (1997)
- Martian Successor Nadesico: The Motion Picture – Prince of Darkness (1998; with Production I.G)
- Cyber Team in Akihabara: Summer Vacation of 2011 (1999; with Production I.G)
- Rockman EXE Hikari to Yami no Program (2005)
- Major: Yūjō no Winning Shot (2008)
- Fafner in the Azure: Heaven and Earth (2010)
- Broken Blade (2010–2011; with Production I.G)
- Pokémon the Movie: Black—Victini and Reshiram and White—Victini and Zekrom (2011; with Production I.G and OLM)
- Space Battleship Yamato 2199 (2012–2013; with AIC)
- Space Battleship Yamato 2199: A Voyage to Remember (2014)
- Space Battleship Yamato 2199: Odyssey of the Celestial Ark (2014)
- Space Battleship Yamato 2202 (2017–2019)
- Eiga Drive Head: Tomica Hyper Rescue Kidō Kyūkyū Keisatsu (2018; with OLM)

=== Game animation ===
- Martian Successor Nadesico
- Macross VFX
- Mega Man 8
- Mega Man X3
- Mega Man X4
- Mega Man Maverick Hunter X
- Sorcerer Hunters
- killer7
- Shaman King: Spirit of Shamans (PSX)

=== Divisions ===
In 2003, the subsidiary Xebec M2 was established, which focuses in providing animation assistance for their main studio and other companies (including OLM, as in Pokémon: Destiny Deoxys). It has also produced three full series: Petopeto-san, ZOMBIE LOAN and Hitohira. Its last activity was in 2009/2010.

In 2010, it was followed by Xebeczwei, which handled in-between, key, and 2nd key animation for Xebec's main studio and other anime studios. It later produced the full series Fafner in the Azure: Exodus, which ran throughout 2015.

In late 2018, it was announced the coloring department of Xebec would be transferred to Signal.MD following the release of the former from IG Port. In addition, Xebeczwei would be transferred to Production I.G as a subsidiary and subsequently be renamed IGzwei.
