= List of Bye Bye, Earth episodes =

Key visual for the series

Bye Bye, Earth is an anime television series based on the Japanese novel of the same name, which is written by Tow Ubukata and originally illustrated by Yoshitaka Amano. Announced in November 2022, the adaptation is co-produced by WOWOW, Sony Pictures and Crunchyroll, produced by Liden Films and directed by Yasuto Nishikata, with assistant direction by Sōta Yokote, scripts written by Hiroyuki Yoshino, character designs handled by Yūki Hino, and music composed by Kevin Penkin. The series aired from July 12 to September 13, 2024, on WOWOW. The opening theme song is "Faceless", performed by ASCA, while the ending theme song is "I LUV U 2", performed by LMYK.

Following the finale of the first season, a second season was announced, with the staff and cast reprising their roles from the series, and aired from April 4 to June 6, 2025. The opening theme song is "Aufheben" (Lift up), performed by Who-ya Extended, while the ending theme song is "MOONWORK", performed by ASCA.

== Series overview ==
| Season | Episodes | Originally released | |
| Season | Episodes | First released | Last released |
|---|---|---|---|
| 1 | 10 | July 12, 2024 | September 13, 2024 |
| 2 | 10 | April 5, 2025 | June 6, 2025 |

== Episodes ==
=== Season 1 (2024) ===
| No. overall | No. in season | Title | Directed by (Note: Production staff information is taken from the ending credits of each episode.) | Written by | Storyboarded by | Original release date |
|---|---|---|---|---|---|---|
| 1 | 1 | "Departure at the Red Hour"; Transliteration: "Shuttatsu. Akai Jikoku Nite" (Japanese: 出立。赤い時刻にて) | Haruka Saiga | Hiroyuki Yoshino | Danichi Togata | July 12, 2024 |
A giant squid-like monster enters and contaminates a lake, so the villagers request aid. Belle Lablac arrives, but the villagers fear her for her human looks. She slays the monster with her incredible strength and her sword Runding as it says it only wanted to return to the sea and spread its eggs. Belle drops an egg into the river and brings a tentacle back to her teacher Sian to eat. He advises her to take the test to become a Nomad so she can find where she belongs, as he has never seen creatures like her before. She dreams of her past, where she was apparently born from a stone and shunned her whole life for not looking like the other animal people. She stole Runding from a tower after hearing it accept her as its partner, but was arrested until Sian took her as an apprentice. The next morning, Belle decides to take the test, so Sian challenges her to a duel. He puts a curse on her that makes her unable to see or remember his face, so that it will not hurt when she kills him. She angrily charges and they clash swords.
| 2 | 2 | "Wherefore in the Earthshine"; Transliteration: "Yuen. Āsushain no Shita" (Japanese: 由縁。聖星照(アースシャイン)の下) | Tarō Morita | Hiroyuki Yoshino | Sōta Yokote | July 19, 2024 |
Belle reaches the field of rocks where she was supposedly born and befriends a seemingly mute rabbit boy. She goes to her hometown, Park City, and enters a tavern, remembering killing Sian. Some troublemakers attack the rabbit so Belle defends him, but finds that her sword becomes dull every time she tries to use it against a living being as part of Sian's curse. She beats them up regardless and is arrested. Losing patience, she breaks down the cell door and is bailed out by Sian's other student Gaff. The city is briefly attacked by zombies from the Army of Insatiable Emptiness as the tavernkeep, Haggis, meets a friend named Adonis. Gaff gives Belle an ID tag, says part of the test to become a Nomad involves serving the king, and arranges an audience with him. The king, a conjoined twin, asks why she wants to be a Nomad and she says she wants to find others like her. The king says to prove herself worthy, she must fight Kir Royale, a knight she once disarmed while stealing Runding.
| 3 | 3 | "Farewell to Those Who Play the Land"; Transliteration: "Ketsubetsu. Daichi o Kanaderu Monotachi" (Japanese: 決別。大地を奏でる者たち) | Akira Odama | Hiroyuki Yoshino | Akira Odama | July 26, 2024 |
Sian, who barely survived his duel with Belle, meets a woman about repairing his sword and they discuss how Belle is destined for great things. Belle defeats Kir Royale in their duel by breaking his flaming sword. The king accepts her and says her next test is to learn to turn her curse into a blessing. While she sleeps, the rabbit takes on a more humanoid form and finds the troublemakers from before plotting revenge on Belle; he makes them hallucinate being on fire. The next day, Gaff warns Belle that the Underdogs have kidnapped several people. Despite not being permitted to join the rescue party, Belle pursues the Underdogs and beats them up, happy to rescue her foster parents and their new daughter, Bellein, who do not shun her like the others. One of the slavers steals Belle's necklace before escaping, but the rabbit gets it back. The rabbit, whom Belle doesn't recognize, asks her on a date and introduces himself as Kitty the All. They go to a tavern for Nomads where a bird woman cursed to only speak in song sings a song that touches Belle's heart. Kitty gives Belle her necklace before leaving.
| 4 | 4 | "Spell of Proof Still Distant"; Transliteration: "Kokuin. Akashi, Imada Tōku" (Japanese: 刻印。証、未だ遠く) | Toshiyuki Anzai | Hiroshi Ōnogi | Sōta Yokote | August 2, 2024 |
Belle is rewarded for defeating the slavers. Gaff tells her about two other knights, the shapeshifting mermaid Tiziano, and Adonis. Gaff breaks up a fight between Adonis and some knights who hate him for his habit of looting weapons from corpses. Belle takes a liking to some kitten-like creatures, but the next day, she finds some knights killed them and beat up Adonis for defending them. Enraged, Belle beats them up. Adonis says he heard Sian call Belle the Girl of Reason, but they do not know what that means. He has his familiar, Bamboo, teleport them to his room to show her his weapon collection, explaining that he is unable to find one attuned to him. The king calls everyone to say Tiziano is a traitor and started a rebellion. As Belle, Adonis, and Gaff march out in an army, Belle finds it ridiculous that they have to follow a script for things like movement, formations, and attacking. Meanwhile, Sian meets Kitty and identifies him as the prince of a neighboring country sent to observe Belle. Sian says Belle's destiny is to question the reason of this land. The army is outnumbered and Belle realizes they are on a suicide mission.
| 5 | 5 | "Performance of Swords and Scales, Good and Evil"; Transliteration: "Engi. Ken to Tenbin, Masayoshi to Aku" (Japanese: 演技。剣と天秤、正義と悪) | Keiji Kawakubo & Tarō Morita | Mitsuyasu Sakai | Masao Suzuki | August 9, 2024 |
The army is attacked by giant spiders, making everyone panic and scatter. Belle is forced to defend a soldier named Benedictine when she panics after her boyfriend Gordon is killed and rises as a zombie. Kitty arrives and helps Belle defeat the zombie Gordon, and she learns Runding can cut zombies. They regroup with others and Adonis and find Tiziano raising the dead as zombies. She spots them and has the zombies attack, but the Underdogs from earlier lead them to a hiding place. The slavers explain Tiziano recruited them, but they turned against her because she has gone mad. Adonis confesses that she went mad after he reported a man she loved had been killed in action. One member of the Outsiders guarding the Katocombs is revealed to be Adonis' father. As they make battle plans, the zombies find them, so everyone charges into battle.
| 6 | 6 | "Concerto in a Land Where Death Blooms"; Transliteration: "Kyōsō. Shi no Sakihokoru Chi de" (Japanese: 協奏。死の咲き誇る地で) | Shunji Yoshida & Ken'ichi Kuhara | Mitsuyasu Sakai | Shinobu Yoshioka | August 16, 2024 |
Kitty makes walls of fire to stave off the zombies, but they counter with water magic. Benedictine loses an eye and makes Belle go berserk, but Benedictine awakens the male soul living alongside hers from within - her body turning into a man's in the process - and calmly uses ice magic. Belle learns that Adonis uses so many swords because any sword he wields quickly degrades due to a curse. To lure Tiziano out, the group makes their stand in a graveyard. Kitty firebombs the zombies, then Tiziano appears and kills or maims many of the group. Tiziano's sword is fused to her arm and her body is mutating. Adonis stabs her several times, but she ignores her injuries and pulls him into a portal. Belle and Kitty jump into the portal and they find themselves in a void where Adonis and Tiziano continue to fight. Realizing she is also a zombie, Belle slices off Tiziano's sword arm, snapping her out of her madness. Adonis embraces Tiziano as she dies.
| 7 | 7 | "Examiner of Curses, Blessings, and their Shapes"; Transliteration: "Shisha. Noroi to Shukufuku no Katachi" (Japanese: 試者。呪いと祝福のかたち) | Asahi Yoshimura | Hiroshi Ōnogi | Hayato Sakoda | August 23, 2024 |
After the battle, they fight duels to honor the dead, but Belle goes home when she learns Gaff killed Adonis' father. Belle meets a sheltered girl named Sherry who seems to not know how to do anything. They take shelter from the rain in Benedictine, now Bennett's house, but Belle has to help bathe her. Belle learns Sherry is the princess. Sherry thanks her with a beautiful song, and Belle comments that singing takes a toll on her, just as Gaff comes to take Sherry home. Adonis reforges Kir Royale's sword and combines it with Tiziano's sword; both are pleased when the result is a sword meant to smite evil. Adonis flusters Belle when he asks to sleep with her. She says only if she falls in love with him. He explains his weapon deteriorating curse came from his father touching a dying Nomad's blood before he was born. Belle asks him to join her when she becomes a Nomad. Sherry comes and asks what Belle meant about singing taking a toll on her, so Belle takes her and her friends to the tavern. After the bird woman performs, Sherry cries and says singing is her only talent and she wants to be useful. Belle says she also wants to be useful and they hug.
| 8 | 8 | "A Ball Shaking Before the Fiend Flower"; Transliteration: "Butō. Ma no Hana ni Yurameite" (Japanese: 舞踏。魔の華に揺らめいて) | Tarō Morita | Hiroshi Ōnogi | Danichi Togata & Misato Takada | August 30, 2024 |
Sherry invites Belle and her friends to a ball where she performs a song with new confidence. Belle dances with Kitty, who calls her "empty" as in free from obligations. Gaff confesses to Adonis that he killed his father and offers his father's sword if he will give up his collection, but Adonis challenges him to a duel instead. Kir Royale, who has become possessed and his arm is fused to his sword like Tiziano was, attacks them and then attacks the ball seeking revenge on Belle. Sherry is briefly possessed by their god who commands Belle to fight him alone. Belle learns Runding can cut him and kills him after getting wounded. As she recovers, the king declares her worthy of the final test to become a Nomad, but she becomes depressed when Adonis will not visit her. He finally comes and kisses her, but claims he is not yet worthy of traveling with her.
| 9 | 9 | "Silence of Keys Unplayed"; Transliteration: "Chinmoku. Kanadenu Kagi" (Japanese: 沈黙。奏でぬ鍵) | Yoshitsugu Kimura, Koji Aritomi, Daiki Handa & Keiji Kawakubo | Mitsuyasu Sakai | Masao Suzuki | September 6, 2024 |
The king says the final test to become a Nomad is simply to play a piano from the heart. Belle has never heard of pianos, but when she presses a key, it makes a resonating note. When she tries again, she is weighed down by doubt and loneliness and the piano makes no sound, so she fails the test, but she says she will never give up and will try again soon. Adonis is attacked by thugs and kills them. It is his turn to take the test, but when Belle leaves, he attacks the guards while demanding the king explain why his friends keep getting corrupted by their swords. The king claims this is all their god's design and Adonis is horrified to see zombie versions of Tiziano, Kir Royale, and the thugs he killed among the guards. Adonis is offered the piano test, but he is unable to make it sound at all and collapses in despair. Adonis visits Belle and after confessing that his mother died giving birth to him, asks to sleep with her. When she declines, he knocks her down and tries to rape her, using his deteriorating touch to destroy her clothes, until she knocks him away. He runs away in shame, but is surrounded by miasma and disappears.
| 10 | 10 | "Spiral: Howling Sword, Rusty Nail"; Transliteration: "Rasen. Unaru Ken, Sabita Tsume" (Japanese: 螺旋。唸る剣、錆びた爪) | Daiki Handa | Hiroyuki Yoshino | Yuki Ikeda | September 13, 2024 |
Adonis wakes up in a void and is greeted by a woman named Dram who forged Runding. She gives him a sword called Rusty Nail that can change shape and repair itself and does not deteriorate at his touch, then has Sian train him. Belle is still traumatized after almost being raped. When she joins a battle, she is sluggish and gets wounded, so Bennett and Guinness treat her in their room. Sian and Dram tell Adonis that Sian is actually Prince Fatale, son of the king, but abandoned his duties. Dram was the royal blacksmith and sees visions of the future, but they ran away when her swords, forged from a sacred tree, kept corrupting their users. They explain Adonis and Belle, the Girl of Reason, have a special destiny together. When Adonis' training is complete, Dram carves the word "Nowhere" on his face, sends him back with the Army of Insatiable Emptiness, and he seems to be powered by the darkness. Belle wakes up.

=== Season 2 (2025) ===
| No. overall | No. in season | Title | Directed by | Written by | Storyboarded by | Original release date |
|---|---|---|---|---|---|---|
| 11 | 1 | "Homesick: Now Budding in the Echoes"; Transliteration: "Kyōshū. Ima Zankyō ni Mebuku" (Japanese: 郷愁。いま残響に芽吹く) | Kenichi Kuhara, Keiji Kawakubo | Hiroshi Ohnogi | Shinji Osada, Hideyo Yamamoto | April 4, 2025 |
Kitty meets Sian and berates him for using Belle as a pawn, but Sian leaves. When Bennett checks on Belle, she flashes back to Adonis almost raping her and attacks him, but he reluctantly swaps back into Benedictine when his female self wishes to help and snaps her out of it. Belle cries and believes it is her fault that Adonis went crazy, but Benedictine helps her see this is not true. Benedictine heals Belle's wounds by connecting their souls, but it comes at the cost of her soul; returning control to Bennett (leaving him as the only soul inhabiting the body) and he goes blind from the strain. Bennett does not mind, happy that Benedictine found peace, and can still navigate with his enhanced hearing. Belle, Bennett, and Guinness attend the funeral of Ginbuck, an elder of the Underdogs. Belle tells an Underdog named Mist, who supported Belle and Adonis getting together, that he had gone crazy and is missing. The priest, Kernel Collins, thanks the three for helping save them from Tiziano. As funeral rites are performed, Guinness promises Ginbuck he will improve his people's future.
| 12 | 2 | "Entreaty: A Paradise that Entrusts Death"; Transliteration: "Kongan. Shi o Takusu Rakuen" (Japanese: 懇願。死を託す楽園) | Hazuki Mizumoto, Daiki Handa, Yuji Kanzaki | Sakai Miho | Daisuke Shimamura | April 11, 2025 |
Guinness says Ginbuck asked him to make a paradise shift (a change in the world) and charges everyone to question the world, having recently learned the kingdom's healing ashes are made from corpses not given proper burials. Kernel Collins gives him a sword and charges him to find and return its sister sword. Some bullies whom Belle previously beat up challenge her to a rematch. As she beats them up, Guinness and Mist sleep together. Belle tells Bennett she will try to set up a peace treaty between the Topdogs and Underdogs and kisses his cheek. Adonis attacks Kitty and stabs him, then steals a vial of poisonous ashes before throwing him into a river. After talking to Sian, Adonis enters the castle and exposes the King to the ashes, making him scream before leaving. As Belle returns to her apartment, Kitty enters in his rabbit form and heals by eating. Belle passes her plans for a peace treaty to Gaff. Sherry apologizes for making her fight Kir Royale to the death, but Belle does not blame her. Belle asks what happened to Kir Royale's body and Gaff says it was disposed of, so Belle realizes Guinness was right about the kingdom not giving people proper burials.
| 13 | 3 | "Confrontation: A Wish Barely Clung To"; Transliteration: "Taiketsu. Tsumasakidachi de Akogare no Mono o Tsukamu" (Japanese: 対決。つま先立ちで憧れのものを掴む) | Arado Tsumori | Hiroyuki Yoshino | Yuki Komada | April 18, 2025 |
Belle realizes Gaff has the sword Guinness was tasked to find. It legally belongs to Adonis since it was his father's, but Gaff will not give it up unless Adonis relinquishes his sword collection. Sherry jokingly flirts with Belle which makes Gaff jealous since he was wooing Sherry. Belle, Bennett, Guinness, Gaff, and Sherry meet the King about the peace treaty, but the King has mutated into a tentacled monstrosity that devours Guinness. Sherry is possessed by their god who tells them not to fight it and commands Sherry to kill it with a Song of Destruction, but she cannot bear to kill her father. The King regains lucidity long enough to beg Belle to kill him, so she strikes him down. Belle suddenly sees her younger self, who cryptically speaks in computer terms while saying Belle should never have awakened, and painfully tries to "shut Belle off"; but Belle fights back and kills her younger self. The monstrosity disintegrates, leaving a still alive Guinness and the King's corpse. Adonis appears claiming responsibility for the King's transformation. Sherry is possessed again and orders Belle arrested for violating the god's decree before fainting. Gaff blindly obeys this and carries Sherry away. Belle beats up the guards who try to arrest her and fights Adonis. She breaks Rusty Nail, but it repairs itself and he reveals it can spread his deteriorating touch, making Runding brittle. He shatters Runding and Belle collapses.
| 14 | 4 | "Doubt: For Love of Reason"; Transliteration: "Kaigi. Kotowari Omouga Yueni" (Japanese: 懐疑。ことわり思うが故に) | Akira Odama | Hiroshi Ohnogi | Akira Odama | April 25, 2025 |
Gaff is chosen as the new king, and he receives a message from the god telling him to find the Key of Journeys in the Black Hour and Black Direction and destroy it. Belle is imprisoned and mournfully holds on to Runding's hilt. Adonis visits and threatens to destroy it, but she repels him, so he leaves her a vial of healing ashes. Adonis joins Gaff's court and Sherry asks why he attacked Belle, but he just laughs. Sherry then confides in him that she suspects their god is not benevolent. Bennett and Guinness were imprisoned too, then Guinness finds the old king has possessed him, making his eye and mouth appear on his palms and saying the old system must be destroyed. Sian appears before Gaff and berates his arrogance, ambition, and blindly obeying the god. Kitty, seeking revenge and declaring his belief in Belle to fix the system, attacks Sian with a flaming phoenix. Adonis and Dram discuss the events. Belle pours the ashes on Runding, which makes her hear a voice from the sword telling her to restore it. Gaff, Sherry, Adonis, and their court move to lay King Lowhide to rest in the sacred tree.
| 15 | 5 | "Aufheben: When Flowers Shed Their Buds and Bloom"; Transliteration: "Shiyō. Tsubomi Sute Hanahiraku Toki" (Japanese: 止揚。蕾捨て花開くとき) | Studio L & Masayuki Egami | Hiroyuki Yoshino | Handa Daiki | May 2, 2025 |
As the court lowers King Lowhide's body into a lake inside the tree, Sherry reveals she has sided with Adonis by singing a song to open a path inside the tree so they can question the god directly. Gaff tries to stop them, but Adonis summons the Army of Insatiable Emptiness and Sherry tells Gaff and his men that they will be forsaken by the god if they fight them. With no choice, Gaff orders Belle, Bennett, and Guinness released. Belle relives her memories in her dreams and after seeing a phoenix version of herself, wakes up to find Runding repairing itself. They are released and escorted to the tree under guard, but their allies in the Underdogs free them. Adonis summons a blind but perceptive girl to guide him and Sherry through the tree. Sherry says she helped him because she wanted to meet the god, but Belle will eventually stop him. Belle's group with the Underdogs fights the Army, but a zombie steals Adonis' father's sword and goes deeper into the tree. Guinness uses spells learned from the King to counter the zombies' anti-magic. Belle faces a huge zombie called Redrum, a cannibal in life who proclaims Adonis his king. Though he cracks Runding with his warhammer, Belle declares she will never quit and repairs Runding before striking him down.
| 16 | 6 | "Absurdity: Asking the Voices of Swords"; Transliteration: "Fujōri. Ken no Koe ni Tou" (Japanese: 不条理。剣の声に問う) | Rei Nakahara | Miho Sakai | Rei Nakahara | May 9, 2025 |
Guinness gives Belle permission to do what she wants, but she chooses to fight with the group. They are attacked by a mermaid zombie with ice powers until Bennett defeats her. Deeper in the tree, a boy zombie attacks the group with soldiers controlled like marionettes until Guinness defeats him. He drops Adonis' father's sword, but Bamboo snatches it and escapes, only to be attacked by Kitty. Gaff and his men appear and order Belle's group to surrender their swords, madly claiming to know the god's will and that he will stop Adonis alone. They refuse and Belle and Gaff fight until Belle points out he has not properly communed with his sword, making him lose the will to fight. Belle's group continues deeper into the tree and enters an area that weakens and causes them pain, though Belle is unaffected. Bamboo appears and Belle kills it, making it drop the sword. More zombies attack them, but Kitty appears, wipes out the zombies, and uses a force field to protect them from the weakening effect. Adonis uses an illusion of himself to trick Belle into accidentally breaking his father's sword. Belle and Kitty decide to confront Adonis and Sherry alone while the others return to the surface with the sword. Bennett suddenly threatens to shoot Belle with an arrow, saying she is too dangerous and could potentially even kill the god, but Guinness believes in her and he stands down. As Belle and Kitty continue, she says she will finally get answers on what she is and where she came from.
| 17 | 7 | "Mania: Nowhere"; Transliteration: "Kyoso. Nowhere" (Japanese: 狂騷。NOWHERE) | Shinsuke Terasawa | Hiroshi Ohnogi | Daisuke Shimamura | May 16, 2025 |
As Adonis and Sherry reach an area with flaming pillars, the blind girl is dismissed. Adonis attacks Sherry with zombies, aiming to add her to the Army of Insatiable Emptiness, but she defends herself with her magical song. Belle arrives and wipes out the zombies before fighting Adonis while Kitty teleports Sherry away. Dram and Sian appear and trap Belle in a tornado of miasma as Sian fights Adonis. Kitty and Sherry arrive at the lake where Gaff and his men threaten Guinness, Bennett, and the Underdogs. Guinness says the god is just a machine that everyone blindly obeyed and they must be free of it, but Gaff won't listen and orders his men to attack. Sherry stops the fighting and declares her opposition to the god, stunning Gaff. Adonis and Sian find the "heart" of the god and it briefly unleashes a weakening effect that doesn't work on Belle. The two deduce that Belle is a descendant of the "true" gods that created the machine. Sian is fatally wounded as Belle breaks free of the miasma. She holds him and cries even though her curse prevents her from remembering him. Dram takes Sian away as Belle and Adonis fight. He deteriorates Runding and completely shatters it, including the hilt, and the rotting effect spreads up Belle's arms, but she has an epiphany and starts chanting a spell.
| 18 | 8 | "Hymn: Erehwon"; Transliteration: "Seika. EREHWON" (Japanese: 聖歌。EREHWON) | Shindo Tsumori | Hiroshi Ohnogi | Hideyo Yamamoto | May 23, 2025 |
As Belle declares she chooses her own future, her spell restores her arms and Runding, then she breaks Rusty Nail and one half of it impales Adonis. Mist is informed of a new tunnel that formed between the castle and the catacombs and investigates it. The Army of Insatiable Emptiness attacks Guinness and Gaff's groups. The god orders Gaff to kill Sherry, but he communes with his sword, and no longer blindly obeying, orders his men to team up with Guinness' group against the zombies. Belle helps Adonis up, where they learn his touch no longer works on her, but he refuses to quit and hurls his sword into the machine. This spreads his rotting power to it and lets him control it. The machine unleashes a storm of miasma as he summons more zombies, but Kitty appears to help Belle. Belle's younger self appears and says Belle is the key and the machine hungers for her, then Adonis merges with the younger self. Sherry sings a song that is heard throughout the kingdom that heals people, fills them with joy, and removes the machine's influence from their minds. Kitty is impaled several times but keeps fighting. Adonis is subsumed by the younger self. When she and Belle clash swords, after an explosion, Belle is shocked to find herself in a modern day city with skyscrapers.
| 19 | 9 | "Reason: Moonwork"; Transliteration: "Riyū. MOONWORK" (Japanese: 理由(ことわり)。MOONWORK) | Kenichi Kuhara | Hiroyuki Yoshino | Hideyo Yamamoto & Tsubukiken | May 30, 2025 |
The younger self narrates that this city was the home of the gods. The events play before Belle. A calamity destroyed the city and the gods evacuated the planet in spaceships, but Belle was left behind on the moon. When she hatched, she played in an amusement park with machines, but when she wanted real companionship, the machines put her in suspended animation until new life could evolve, which took countless eons while the machine in the tree monitored her and was worshiped. The younger self is the avatar of the machine who is tired of existing and wants Belle to destroy it. After a battle, Belle slices her and the machine in half. Adonis appears, cured of his madness, but starts to fade away. They declare their love and kiss before he disappears. Kitty pulls Belle out of that strange dimension. She now knows where she came from and there is no one like her in the world. She kisses Kitty's cheek before leaving. The zombies disappear, then the tree releases butterflies that heal everyone, including Sian. Belle meets Mist and they find the unconscious Sian and take him with them as they meet Guinness and the others. Guinness says he will teach Belle the secrets of the sword. When Gaff asks Belle what happened, she says the machine was destroyed, but the butterflies are a miracle called Moonwork.
| 20 | 10 | "Nomad: Now Here"; Transliteration: "Tabibito. Tadaima Koko ni Arishi" (Japanese: 旅人。ただ今ここに在りし) | Unknown | Unknown | TBA | June 6, 2025 |
Sian wakes up with Belle. She still cannot remember him, but Gaff told her who he is. He expresses pride in her and she kisses his cheek as he leaves. Belle, Guinness, and Bennett meet Adonis' brother, Sandy, who restores his father's sword. A new sacred tree sprouts, but they say they will never be slaves to the machines again and Belle chops it down. The Underdogs gift Belle a giant turtle mount, Bennett gifts her a harp, and Sandy gifts her a robe that belonged to Adonis, so she kisses all their cheeks. Belle meets Gaff to take the test to become a Nomad. She suddenly tries to destroy the piano, but her sword goes through it. The "NOWHERE" inscribed on the piano changes to "NOW HERE" and it plays a beautiful song by itself. The piano dissolves into light that enters everyone's shadows, so Gaff realizes the Key of Journeys is in everyone and everyone is worthy of becoming a Nomad. Belle meets Sherry who says she will study witchcraft, then cries because Belle is leaving. Belle promises to return and they kiss each other's cheeks. As Belle leaves the city on the turtle, Kitty sees her off, then follows her at a distance. Belle later encounters a barrier and is attacked by wraiths, with the phoenix explaining it is a boundary between nations and the wraiths are the restless dead who attack anyone who tries to leave. Belle uses Runding to defeat the wraiths and break through the barrier, eager for new adventures.
