= Toshimasa Suzuki =

Japanese director and animator

Toshimasa Suzuki 鈴木 利正
- Born: 1966 (age 59–60); Japan
- Occupations: Animator, director, storyboard artist
- Years active: 1989–present
- Employer: Shaft (1988–2000)
- Known for: Heroic Age; Lagrange: The Flower of Rin-ne
- Spouse: Mitsuko Sekimoto

Toshimasa Suzuki (Japanese: 鈴木 利正, Hepburn: Suzuki Toshimasa) is a Japanese director, animator, and storyboard artist. He joined Shaft in 1995 as an episode director and storyboard artist, and although he continues to work for Shaft, Suzuki commonly directs series with other studios, most notably with Xebec, where he made his series directorial debut with Heroic Age in 2007.

== Career and life ==
Suzuki joined Shaft around 1988 as a key animator. He made his debut as an episode director and storyboard artist for the studio's first original television series, Juuni Senshi Bakuretsu Eto Ranger, in 1995. His employment with Shaft continued until the early 2000s, when he decided to go freelance (he continued to work with Shaft as a freelancer). In 2007, he debuted as a series director with Xebec with Heroic Age under the supervision of Takashi Noto. For the next few years, Suzuki focused solely on freelancing work with other studios. He continued to do work with Xebec, directing Lagrange: The Flower of Rin-ne and Fafner in the Azure: Heaven and Earth, and started directing series outside of either Xebec or Shaft, such as The Pilot's Love Song and The Price of Smiles.

Suzuki was born in 1966, and he is married to color designer Mitsuko Sekimoto, who has worked with Suzuki on all of his directorial projects outside of Shaft.

=== Style ===
He said that he is a fan of hard sci-fi, as well as a fan of foreign sci-fi productions, which he has used for inspiration on works like Fafner in the Azure and Heroic Age. Although a fan of watching realistic and 'muddy' depictions of emotions, he himself does not like to make realistic depictions in his works, and is instead more interested in making his works beautiful and exaggerated. Writer Tow Ubukata commented on Suzuki's ideal of beauty by saying he was good at directing emotional scenes.

After he worked as Akiyuki Shinbo's assistant on Tsukuyomi: Moon Phase, Suzuki wanted to use some of Shinbo's visual composition techniques himself while working on Fafner: Right of Left succeeding the end of Tsukuyomi's production. Broadly, he stated that his way of creating images changed after working on Tsukuyomi. Director Ryūtarō Nakamura's sense of light and shadows, whom Suzuki worked under as the assistant director for Sakura Wars (2000), also had an effect on Suzuki's style.

== Works ==
=== Television series ===
In "Director(s)" column highlights Suzuki's directorial works.

Year	Title	Director(s)	Studio	SB (Note: Storyboard artist.)	ED (Note: Episode director, equivalent to unit director.)	Other roles and notes	Ref(s)
1989	Blue Blink	Osamu Tezuka; Seitarou Hara	Tezuka Productions	No	No	Animator	
1989	Idol Densetsu Eriko	Tetsurō Amino	Ashi Productions	No	No	In-between animator	
1990	Kyatto Ninden Teyandee	Kunitoshi Okajima	Tatsunoko Production	No	No	In-between animator	
1991	Oh! My Konbu	Tetsuo Imazawa	Shaft	No	No	Key animator	
1993	Thumbelina: A Magical Story	Hiromitsu Morita		No	No	Key animator	
1995	Weather Report Girl	Kunihiko Yuyama	Pastel	No	No	Key animator	
1995	Juuni Senshi Bakuretsu Eto Ranger	Kunitoshi Okajima (chief)	Shaft	Yes	Yes	Key animator	
1997	Hareluya II Boy	Kiyoshi Egami	Triangle Staff	Yes	Yes		
1997	Sakura Diaries	Kunitoshi Okajima	Shaft	Yes	Yes		
1997	Burn-Up Excess	Shinichiro Kimura	Magic Bus	Yes	Yes		
1997	Battle Athletes Victory	Katsuhito Akiyama	AIC	Yes	Yes		
1998	Silent Mobius	Hideki Tonokatsu	Shaft (Radix)	Yes	Yes		
1998	Generator Gawl	Seiji Mizushima	Tatsunoko Production	Yes	Yes		
1999	Dual! Parallel Trouble Adventure	Katsuhito Akiyama	AIC	Yes	Yes		
1999	Power Stone	Takahiro Omori	Pierrot	Yes	No	Key animator	
1999	A Pair of Queens	Takashi Watanabe	Triangle Staff	Yes	No	Key animator	
1999	Dai-Guard	Seiji Mizushima	Xebec	Yes	Yes		
2000	Sakura Wars	Ryūtarō Nakamura	Madhouse	Yes	Yes	Assistant director (13 episodes)	
2000	Dotto! Koni-chan	Shinichi Watanabe	Shaft	Yes	Yes		
2001	Mahoromatic	Hiroyuki Yamaga	Gainax; Shaft	Yes	Yes		
2001	Shaman King	Seiji Mizushima	Xebec	Yes	Yes		
2002	A Little Snow Fairy Sugar	Hiroaki Sakurai (chief); Shinichiro Kimura	J.C. Staff	Yes	No		
2002	Cyborg 009: The Cyborg Soldier	Jun Kawagoe	Japan Vistec	Yes	Yes		
2003	Mahoromatic: Something More Beautiful	Hiroyuki Yamaga	Gainax; Shaft	Yes	No		
2003	Stellvia	Tatsuo Satō	Xebec	Yes	Yes		
2004	This Ugly yet Beautiful World	Shouji Saeki	Gainax; Shaft	Yes	Yes	Key animator	
2004	Tetsujin 28-go	Yasuhiro Imagawa	Palm Studio	Yes	No		
2004	Fafner in the Azure: Dead Aggressor	Nobuyoshi Habara	Xebec	Yes	Yes		
2004	Tsukuyomi: Moon Phase	Akiyuki Shinbo (chief)	Shaft	Yes	Yes	Assistant director Ending director	
2005	He Is My Master	Shouji Saeki	Gainax; Shaft	No	Yes	Ending director	
2005	Rozen Maiden: Träumend	Kō Matsuo	Nomad	No	Yes		
2006	The Third: The Girl with the Blue Eye	Jun Kamiya	Xebec	Yes	Yes		
2007	Heroic Age	Takashi Noto (chief); Toshimasa Suzuki	Xebec	Yes	Yes		
2007	Ef: A Tale of Memories	Shin Oonuma	Shaft	No	No	Assistant episode director	
2008	Wangan Midnight	Tsuneo Tominaga	A.C.G.T	Yes	No		
2008	Kanokon: The Girl Who Cried Fox	Atsushi Ōtsuki	Xebec	Yes	No		
2008	Kyō no Go no Ni	Tsuyoshi Nagasawa	Xebec	Yes	No		
2009	Polyphonica: Crimson S	Toshimasa Suzuki	Diomedéa	Yes	Yes	Ending director and storyboard	
2009	Tears to Tiara	Tomoki Kobayashi	White Fox	No	Yes		
2009	Bakemonogatari	Akiyuki Shinbo; Tatsuya Oishi (series)	Shaft	Yes	Yes	Assistant episode director Opening director Key animator	
2010	Dance in the Vampire Bund	Akiyuki Shinbo; Masahiro Sonoda (series)	Shaft	No	No	Ending director	
2010	Hidamari Sketch x Hoshimittsu	Akiyuki Shinbo; Kenichi Ishikura (series)	Shaft	No	No	Ending director	
2010	Arakawa Under the Bridge	Akiyuki Shinbo; Yukihiro Miyamoto (series)	Shaft	Yes	No		
2011	Softenni	Ryouki Kamitsubo	Xebec	No	No	Opening director and storyboard	
2012	Lagrange: The Flower of Rin-ne	Tatsuo Satō (chief); Toshimasa Suzuki	Xebec	Yes	Yes		
2013	Unlimited Psychic Squad	Shishō Igarashi	Manglobe	Yes	No	Ending storyboard	
2013	Sasami-san@Ganbaranai	Akiyuki Shinbo	Shaft	Yes	No		
2014	The Pilot's Love Song	Toshimasa Suzuki	TMS Entertainment; 3xCube	Yes	Yes		
2014	Hanamonogatari	Akiyuki Shinbo (chief); Tomoyuki Itamura	Shaft	No	No	Ending director and storyboard	
2015	Fafner in the Azure: Exodus	Takashi Noto (chief); Nobuyoshi Habara	Xebec	Yes	Yes		
2015	Nisekoi:	Akiyuki Shinbo (chief); Yukihiro Miyamoto (chief episode)	Shaft	No	No	Opening director	
2016	Sweetness and Lightning	Tarō Iwasaki	TMS Entertainment; 3xCube	No	No	Opening director	
2016	March Comes In like a Lion	Akiyuki Shinbo; Kenjirou Okada (series)	Shaft	Yes	No		
2018	Fate/Extra: Last Encore	Akiyuki Shinbo (chief); Yukihiro Miyamoto (series)	Shaft	Yes	No		
2019	The Price of Smiles	Toshimasa Suzuki	Tatsunoko Production	Yes	Yes		
2020	Magia Record: Puella Magi Madoka Magica Side Story	Doroinu (chief); Various	Shaft	Yes	No	Key animator	
2022	RWBY: Ice Queendom	Toshimasa Suzuki; Kenjirou Okada (chief)	Shaft	Yes	Yes	Opening director	
2025	The Shiunji Family Children	Ryouki Kamitsubo	Doga Kobo	No	No	Opening storyboard artist	
2026	Eren the Southpaw	Toshimasa Suzuki	Signal.MD; Production I.G	Yes	Yes	Opening storyboard artist	

=== OVAs/ONAs ===
Year	Title	Director(s)	Studio	SB	ED	Other roles and notes	Ref(s)
1994	Legend of the Galactic Heroes	Noboru Ishiguro (chiefF); Masatoshi Tahara (series); Keizou Shimizu (animation)	K-Factory (Shaft)	Yes	Yes	Key animator	
2000	Kita e: Pure Session	Mitsuko Kase	Studio D-Volt	No	Yes		
2003	Arcade Gamer Fubuki	Yūji Mutō	Shaft	No	Yes	Key animator	
2008	Shina Dark	Toshimasa Suzuki; Shinpei Tomooka; Naoyuki Konno; Shin Oonuma	Shaft	No	No		
2010	Hen Semi	Ryouki Kamitsubo	Xebec	No	No	Opening director and storyboard	
2012	Lagrange: The Flower of Rin-ne	Tatsuo Satō (chief); Toshimasa Suzuki	Xebec	No	No		
2025	Moonrise	Masashi Koizuka	Wit Studio	No	Yes		

=== Films ===
Year	Title	Director(s)	Studio	SB	ED	Other roles and notes	Ref(s)
2010	Fafner in the Azure: Heaven and Earth	Takashi Noto (chief); Toshimasa Suzuki	Xebec	Yes	Yes		
2016	Kizumonogatari I: Tekketsu	Akiyuki Shinbo (chief); Tatsuya Oishi	Shaft	No	Yes		
2017	Kizumonogatari III: Reiketsu	Akiyuki Shinbo (chief); Tatsuya Oishi	Shaft	No	Yes		
2017	Fireworks	Akiyuki Shinbo (chief); Nobuyuki Takeuchi	Shaft	No	Yes		
2019	Fafner in the Azure: The Beyond	Takashi Noto	Xebec Zwei	Yes	No		
2023	Fafner: Behind the Line	Takashi Noto	I.G Zwei	No	No	Key animator	

=== Video games ===
Year	Title	Studio	Roles	Ref(s)
2016	Fate/EXTELLA	Shaft	Opening cinematic storyboard artist	

== Notes ==
=== Web citations ===
- Hirota, Keisuke (2017). アニメ業界ウォッチング第30回：「監督」と「演出」は、職業的にどう違うのか？ 鈴木利正インタビュー！ [Anime Industry Watching No.85: What is the professional difference between "Director" and "Episode Director"? An interview with Toshimasa Suzuki!]. Akiba Souken (in Japanese).
