= List of Vinland Saga episodes =

Key visual of the series

Vinland Saga is an anime television series based on the manga series Vinland Saga by Makoto Yukimura. Twin Engine announced on March 19, 2018, that the series would receive an anime television series adaptation animated by Wit Studio. The series is directed by Shūhei Yabuta, with Hiroshi Seko handling series composition, Takahiko Abiru designing the characters and Yutaka Yamada composing the music. The series focuses on Thorfinn, the young Iceland villager who aims to participate in wars like his retired father, Thors.

The anime aired from July 8, 2019, with the first three episodes, and finished on December 30, 2019. The series ran for 24 episodes on NHK General TV. Amazon streams the series in North America and Australia on their Prime Video service. Due to the pending arrival of Typhoon Faxai on September 8, 2019, Episode 10 was delayed due to broadcasting news, and resumed on September 15, 2019. Due to the airing of the World Para Athletics Championship sports tournament on NHK, Episode 18 was delayed and resumed on November 17, 2019. The first opening theme is "Mukanjyo" by Survive Said the Prophet while the first ending theme is "Torches" by Aimer. The second opening theme is "Dark Crow" by Man with a Mission and the second ending theme is "Drown" by milet.

In July 2021, Twin Engine announced that a second season was in production. Shūhei Yabuta returned as director, and Takahiko Abiru returned as character designer. On May 5, 2022, it was announced that MAPPA would be taking over for the second season of the series. It aired from January 10 to June 20, 2023, on Tokyo MX, BS11, and GBS. (Note: Tokyo MX lists the series premiere at 24:30 on January 9, 2023, which is effectively 12:30 a.m. JST on January 10.) The season ran for 24 episodes. The third opening theme is "River" by Anonymouz, while the third ending theme is "Without Love" by LMYK. The fourth opening theme is "Paradox" by Survive Said the Prophet while the fourth ending theme is "Ember" by haju:harmonics.

== Series overview ==
Season	Episodes	Originally released	
Season	Episodes	First released	Last released
1	24	July 8, 2019	December 30, 2019
2	24	January 10, 2023	June 20, 2023

== Episodes ==
=== Season 1 (2019) ===
No. overall	No. in season	Title	Directed by	Written by	Original release date
1	1	"Somewhere Not Here"; Transliteration: "Koko de wa Nai Dokoka" (Japanese: ここではないどこか)	Shūhei Yabuta	Hiroshi Seko	July 8, 2019
2	2	"Sword"; Transliteration: "Ken" (Japanese: 剣)	Yōji Satō	Hiroshi Seko	July 8, 2019
3	3	"Troll"; Transliteration: "Tororu" (Japanese: 戦鬼(トロル))	Yōsuke Yamamoto	Hiroshi Seko	July 8, 2019
4	4	"A True Warrior"; Transliteration: "Hontō no Senshi" (Japanese: 本当の戦士)	Michiru Itabisashi	Hiroshi Seko	July 29, 2019
5	5	"The Troll's Son"; Transliteration: "Tororu no Ko" (Japanese: 戦鬼(トロル)の子)	Tomoko Hiramuki, Yōji Satō	Kenta Ihara, Hiroshi Seko	August 5, 2019
6	6	"The Journey Begins"; Transliteration: "Tabi no Hajimari" (Japanese: 旅の始まり)	Yōsuke Yamamoto	Kenta Ihara, Hiroshi Seko	August 12, 2019
7	7	"Normanni"; Transliteration: "Norumanni" (Japanese: 北人(ノルマンニ))	Shingo Uchida	Kenta Ihara, Hiroshi Seko	August 19, 2019
8	8	"Beyond the Edge of the Sea"; Transliteration: "Umi no Hate no Hate" (Japanese: 海の果ての果て)	Tomoaki Koshida	Kenta Ihara, Hiroshi Seko	August 26, 2019
9	9	"The Battle of London Bridge"; Transliteration: "Rondon-bashi no Shitō" (Japanese: ロンドン橋の死闘)	Michiru Itabisashi	Kenta Ihara, Hiroshi Seko	September 2, 2019
10	10	"Ragnarok"; Transliteration: "Ragunaroku" (Japanese: ラグナロク)	Yūsuke Sunouchi, Aiko Sakuraba	Kenta Ihara, Hiroshi Seko	September 16, 2019
11	11	"A Gamble"; Transliteration: "Kake" (Japanese: 賭け)	Shigatsu Yoshikawa	Kenta Ihara, Hiroshi Seko	September 23, 2019
12	12	"The Land on the Far Bank"; Transliteration: "Taigan no Kuni" (Japanese: 対岸の国)	Yōji Satō	Kenta Ihara, Hiroshi Seko	September 30, 2019
13	13	"Child of a Hero"; Transliteration: "Eiyū no Ko" (Japanese: 英雄の子)	Yōsuke Yamamoto	Kenta Ihara, Hiroshi Seko	October 7, 2019
14	14	"The Light of Dawn"; Transliteration: "Gyōkō" (Japanese: 暁光)	Atsushi Kobayashi	Kenta Ihara, Hiroshi Seko	October 14, 2019
15	15	"After Yule"; Transliteration: "Yuru no Ato" (Japanese: 冬至祭(ユル)のあと)	Michiru Itabisashi	Kenta Ihara, Hiroshi Seko	October 21, 2019
16	16	"History of Beasts"; Transliteration: "Kedamono no Rekishi" (Japanese: ケダモノの歴史)	Takashi Andō	Kenta Ihara, Hiroshi Seko	October 28, 2019
17	17	"Servant"; Transliteration: "Tsukaeshi Mono" (Japanese: 仕えし者)	Daisuke Kurose, Michiru Itabisashi, Yōsuke Yamamoto	Kenta Ihara, Hiroshi Seko	November 4, 2019
18	18	"Out of the Cradle"; Transliteration: "Yurikago no Soto" (Japanese: ゆりかごの外)	Shūjirō Ami, Atsushi Kobayashi	Kenta Ihara, Hiroshi Seko	November 18, 2019
19	19	"United Front"; Transliteration: "Kyōtō" (Japanese: 共闘)	Yōji Satō, Michiru Itabisashi	Kenta Ihara, Hiroshi Seko	November 25, 2019
20	20	"Crown"; Transliteration: "Ōkan" (Japanese: 王冠)	Michiru Itabisashi	Kenta Ihara, Hiroshi Seko	December 2, 2019
21	21	"Reunion"; Transliteration: "Saikai" (Japanese: 再会)	Yūsuke Sunouchi	Kenta Ihara, Hiroshi Seko	December 9, 2019
22	22	"Lone Wolf"; Transliteration: "Korō" (Japanese: 孤狼)	Yasuo Ejima	Kenta Ihara, Hiroshi Seko	December 16, 2019
23	23	"Miscalculation"; Transliteration: "Gosan" (Japanese: 誤算)	Yōsuke Yamamoto	Kenta Ihara, Hiroshi Seko	December 23, 2019
24	24	"End of the Prologue (Note: This episode has an English title only, stylized in all caps in the original Japanese release)"	Tadahito Matsubayashi, Shūhei Yabuta	Kenta Ihara, Hiroshi Seko	December 30, 2019

=== Season 2 (2023) ===
No. overall	No. in season	Title (Note: The first set of English translated titles are taken from Netflix and the official anime website.) (Note: The second set of English translated titles are taken from Crunchyroll. For episodes where there are none, the first set is used.)	Directed by	Written by	Original release date
25	1	"Slave"; Transliteration: "Dorei" (Japanese: 奴隷)	Nobuyoshi Arai, Yōsuke Yamamoto	Hiroshi Seko	January 10, 2023
26	2	"Ketil's Farm"; Transliteration: "Ketiru no Nōjō" (Japanese: ケティルの農場)	Michiru Itabisashi	Hiroshi Seko	January 17, 2023
27	3	"Snake"; Transliteration: "Hebi" (Japanese: 蛇)	Yōji Satō	Hiroshi Seko	January 24, 2023
28	4	"Awakening"; Transliteration: "Mezame" (Japanese: 目覚め)	Yōji Satō	Hiroshi Seko	January 31, 2023
29	5	"The Path of Blood" / "Path of Blood"; Transliteration: "Chi no Michi" (Japanese: 血の道)	Shigeru Fukase	Hiroshi Seko	February 7, 2023
30	6	"I Want a Horse" / "We Need a Horse"; Transliteration: "Uma ga Hoshii" (Japanese: 馬が欲しい)	Kento Matsui	Hiroshi Seko	February 14, 2023
31	7	"Iron Fist Ketil"; Transliteration: "Tekken Ketiru" (Japanese: 鉄拳ケティル)	Michiru Itabisashi	Hiroshi Seko	February 21, 2023
32	8	"An Empty Man"; Transliteration: "Karappo na Otoko" (Japanese: カラッポな男)	Tadahito Matsubayashi	Hiroshi Seko	February 28, 2023
33	9	"Oath"; Transliteration: "Chikai" (Japanese: 誓い)	Tadahito Matsubayashi	Hiroshi Seko	March 7, 2023
34	10	"Cursed Head" / "The Cursed Head"; Transliteration: "Noroi no Kubi" (Japanese: 呪いの首)	Takahiro Kaneko	Hiroshi Seko	March 14, 2023
35	11	"The King and the Sword" / "Kings and Swords"; Transliteration: "Ō to Ken" (Japanese: 王と剣)	Yoho Ishikawa	Hiroshi Seko	March 21, 2023
36	12	"For the Love that Was Lost" / "For Lost Love"; Transliteration: "Ushinawareta Ai no Tame ni" (Japanese: 失われた愛のために)	Hiromi Nishiyama	Hiroshi Seko	March 28, 2023
37	13	"Dark Clouds"; Transliteration: "An'un" (Japanese: 暗雲)	Kōki Aoshima	Hiroshi Seko	April 4, 2023
38	14	"Freedom"; Transliteration: "Jiyū" (Japanese: 自由)	Yōji Satō	Hiroshi Seko	April 11, 2023
39	15	"Storm"; Transliteration: "Arashi" (Japanese: 嵐)	Takuya Igarashi	Hiroshi Seko	April 18, 2023
40	16	"Cause" / "Great Purpose"; Transliteration: "Taigi" (Japanese: 大義)	Tadahito Matsubayashi	Hiroshi Seko	April 25, 2023
41	17	"Way Home" / "The Road Home"; Transliteration: "Ieji" (Japanese: 家路)	Shingo Uchida, Yoho Ishikawa	Hiroshi Seko	May 2, 2023
42	18	"The First Measure" / "The First Method"; Transliteration: "Saisho no Shudan" (Japanese: 最初の手段)	Yousuke Yamamoto	Hiroshi Seko	May 9, 2023
43	19	"War at Ketil's Farm" / "The Battle of Ketil's Farm"; Transliteration: "Ketiru Nōjō no Tatakai" (Japanese: ケティル農場の戦い)	Takashi Ishida	Hiroshi Seko	May 16, 2023
44	20	"Pain"; Transliteration: "Itami" (Japanese: 痛み)	Aki Aoshima	Hiroshi Seko	May 23, 2023
45	21	"Courage"; Transliteration: "Yūki" (Japanese: 勇気)	Tarou Kubo, Tomoko Hiramuki	Hiroshi Seko	May 30, 2023
46	22	"Emperor of Rebellion" / "The King of Rebellion"; Transliteration: "Hangyaku no Teiō" (Japanese: 叛逆の帝王)	Yoji Sato	Hiroshi Seko	June 6, 2023
47	23	"Two Paths"; Transliteration: "Futatsu no Michi" (Japanese: ふたつの道)	Yoho Ishikawa	Hiroshi Seko	June 13, 2023
48	24	"Hometown" / "Home"; Transliteration: "Kokyō" (Japanese: 故郷)	Kento Matsui	Hiroshi Seko	June 20, 2023

== Home media release ==
=== Japanese ===
VAP (Japan – Region 2/A)
Volume	Episodes	Release date	Ref.
1	1–6	December 25, 2019	
2	7–12	January 22, 2020	
3	13–18	February 19, 2020	
4	19–24	March 25, 2020	
5	25–36	June 21, 2023	
6	37–48	August 23, 2023	

=== English ===
(North America)
Volume	Episodes	Release date	Limited edition release date	Region	Publisher	Ref.
Season 1	1–24	August 31, 2021	July 26, 2022	A	Sentai Filmworks	
Season 2 Part 1	25–36	July 2, 2024		A, B	Crunchyroll	
Season 2 Part 2	37–48	October 15, 2024		A, B	Crunchyroll	
