= Heroic Age (TV series) =

Manga

- Promotional image for the anime series Heroic Age

ヒロイック・エイジ (Hiroikku Eiji)
- Genre: Space opera, mecha
- Created by: Tow Ubukata; Xebec
- Anime television series
- Directed by: Takashi Noto (chief); Toshimasa Suzuki
- Produced by: Gō Nakanishi; Takatoshi Chino; Takashi Noto
- Written by: Tow Ubukata
- Music by: Naoki Satō
- Studio: Xebec
- Licensed by: NA: Crunchyroll
- Original network: TV Tokyo
- Original run: April 1, 2007 – September 30, 2007
- Episodes: 26
- Manga
- Written by: Tow Ubukata
- Illustrated by: Kugeko Warabino
- Published by: Kodansha
- Magazine: Magazine Z
- Original run: May 2007 – August 2008
- Volumes: 4

Heroic Age (ヒロイック・エイジ, Hiroikku Eiji) is a Japanese science fiction mecha space opera anime originally conceptualized by Tow Ubukata. The series first aired on TV Tokyo on April 1, 2007, and ended on September 30, 2007, with 26 episodes.

On July 23, 2007, a manga adaptation began serialization in Kodansha's Magazine Z. Though the story is the same, it is told from the point of view of Iolaous. Five official guidebooks were also published and had consecutive monthly releases from July to November 2007.

== Premise ==
The story's theme is based on stories in Greek mythology, especially those surrounding Heracles, upon whom the main character is based, and his Twelve Labors. Many of the other characters are also based on Greek mythological figures; characters share similar names to their Greek counterparts, and their relationship with others corresponds with Greek stories. The title of the series, Heroic Age, is also a slight testament to the similarities to Greek mythology, referring to the time of the Heroic Age. The tribes featured in the anime are loosely based on Hesiod's Five Ages of Mankind.

== Storyline ==
The Golden Tribe watching the universe.

The show is set in a futuristic universe, controlled by a few races or "tribes" that possess the capabilities for interstellar travel. The universe had once been ruled by a "Golden Tribe" (黄金の種族 Ougon no Shuzoku), who had since left the current galaxy long ago; they passed on their knowledge to the humanoid "Silver Tribe" (銀の種族, Gin no Shuzoku), the insectoid "Bronze Tribe" (青銅の種族, Seidou no Shuzoku), and the gigantic "Heroic Tribe" (英雄の種族, Eiyuu no Shuzoku). The latter was later punished by the Golden Tribe for causing havoc in the universe and made to serve the other tribes as 'Nodos' (ノドス, Nodosu) - extremely powerful beings that play a key role in the story. Before the Golden Tribe departed, Humanity answered the call of the Golden Tribe and was dubbed the "Iron Tribe" (鉄の種族, Tetsu no Shuzoku). Viewed as a threat to the order of things, the Silver Tribe decided to annihilate the Iron Tribe with the aid of the Bronze Tribe. However, humanity survived their assault on Earth and scattered their numbers across the stars to preserve their race.

The story follows the voyages of the starship Argonaut and its crew to find a means to bring peace to the universe. The ship carries the young human clairvoyant princess Dhianeila, who is on a mission to find the mythical savior of the human race. This savior is expected to aid humanity in their war against the Silver and Bronze tribes, who are bent on humanity's extermination.

Initially, the expedition finds a child-hearted boy called Age on a partially destroyed planet. When the Argonaut is attacked by the Bronze tribe, Age is shown to transform into a "Nodos" form, Bellcross, a gigantic and immensely powerful being. He easily fends off the superior attacking force. Having found their messiah, the Argonaut starts its way back to Dhianeila's home world, Duey. During their journey home, the Silver Tribe launches several attacks on the Argonaut to prevent the ship from returning to their home world, but Age always manages to stop them.

During the many attacks on the Argonaut, the crew begins to warm up to Age, they had been fearful of his powers as a Nodos. The Silver tribesman Phaetho O assigns himself the role of "testing" Age, destroying the Argonaut and all the Iron Tribe on it. After Age drives Phaetho O away and saves his tribe, they all begin to accept him. Iolaous Oz Mehelim of the Yunos knights is jealous of Age but warms up to him after the attack on Titarros. Once they escape the battle against Phaetho O at Titarros, the Argonaut crew arrives near the Cemetery belt where they are again attacked by Phaetho O and the Bronze Tribe accompanying him. Here, Age fights another Nodos who had visited him on Titarros. During the fight, the Argonaut manages to escape; however, to do so, Age had to stay behind to fight. The Argonaut warps to what they think is an unoccupied place and ends up running into stragglers from the Bronze Tribe. Rather than fight, they attempt to run, only to be cornered by an enormous fleet. The fleet is also Iron Tribe, after saving the Argonaut that fleet accompanies them and they leave to help Age.

After reaching back to Duey, word had spread throughout humanity of the Argonaut's success, and Dhianeila's brothers used the momentum to successfully convince humanity to launch a counter-offensive against the Silver and Bronze Tribes. With humanity united under the Junos family, the Silver Tribe throws the full might of their forces, along with their 4 Nodos's to destroy humanity. As the fighting intensifies, the humans move towards the Golden Tribes' old home world. At the last moment, contact is made between the Silver Tribe, humanity, and the Nodos of each side. Dhianeila brings the Silver Tribe to accept a ceasefire, and Age is shown to be the "key" to opening a portal to the universe into which the Golden Tribe has moved.

When this portal is opened, the Silver Tribe moves on to this other universe and passes all of its knowledge to humanity, including the ability to control the Bronze Tribe. However, during the battle, Age is missing after he opened the gateway; some believed he died in the process, while others believed he would return one day. Honoring Age's wish, Dhianeila dedicated the next few years of her life to restoring Age's home planet.

Four years later, Humanity has now brought order throughout the universe. With the Silver Tribe's technology, humanity had advanced further and rebuilt Earth. Dhianeila and the Argonauts' team have succeeded in restoring Age's home, but through it all, she missed Age the most. Just as she was about to leave the only planet that gave her some comfort, the Golden Tribe's gateway opened and revealed that Age was alive, and he and Dhianeila were reunited.

== Media ==
=== Anime ===
The television series was produced by King Records, KlockWorx and Xebec and directed by Takashi Noto and Toshimasa Suzuki, with Tow Ubukata handling series composition, Hisashi Hirai designing the characters and Naoki Satō composing the music. It first aired on April 1, 2007, and is now completed with a total of 26 episodes, the last of which aired on September 30, 2007. Dhianeila gives a short narrative in the first five episodes to explain the Golden Tribe, Silver, Bronze, Heroic, and Iron Tribes, and the events leading up to the anime series. Since episode 14, a new introduction shows the Iron Tribe members differently than in the first episode's introduction.

The anime was licensed for North American distribution by Funimation on June 30, 2008. A release date was set for May 12, 2009. As of May 2011, episodes 1–26 of Heroic Age are available dubbed in English via Netflix streaming, and episodes 1–26 are available both dubbed and subtitled at Hulu.

==== DVDs ====
The first two DVD volumes had a simultaneous release in Japan on August 8, 2007. It was announced that every volume would contain two episodes. The first two volumes would also contain an eight-page booklet and stickers of the corresponding DVD cover for a limited time only. The illustrations on the cover jackets are designed by Hisashi Hirai.

The third volume was released on September 5, 2007, and also contained a sticker of the jacket cover.

Volumes

Heroic Age I - contains episodes 1 and 2 (Release date: August 8, 2007)
Heroic Age II - contains episodes 3 and 4 (Release date: August 8, 2007)
Heroic Age III - contains episodes 5 and 6 (Release date: September 5, 2007)
Heroic Age IV - contains episodes 7 and 8 (Release date: October 10, 2007)
Heroic Age V - contains episodes 9 and 10 (Release date: November 7, 2007)
Heroic Age VI - contains episodes 11 and 12 (Release date: December 5, 2007)
Heroic Age VII - contains episodes 13 and 14 (Release date: January 9, 2008)
Heroic Age VIII - contains episodes 15 and 16 (Release date: January 9, 2008)
Heroic Age IX - contains episodes 17 and 18 (Release date: February 6, 2008)

Heroic Age: Complete Series - contains episodes 1–26 on Blu-ray 3-disk box set (Release date: February 16, 2010)

=== Manga ===
On July 23, 2007, the first volume of the series' manga adaptation began serialization in the Japanese magazine, Magazine Z. The manga is published by Kodansha Publishers, Ltd. The story is the same as the anime; however, the story will be told from Ioraus' point of view.

Volumes

Heroic Age Manga 1 - Release date: July 23, 2007
Heroic Age Manga 2 - Release date: November 22, 2007

=== Guidebooks ===
Along with the manga, the first of five official guidebooks was published in Kodansha's Magazine Z on July 23, 2007. The following four volumes had consecutive monthly releases, with the last one being released on November 30, 2007. Each guidebook has a total of 36 colored pages.

Volumes

Heroic Age Official Guidebook Volume 1 - Release date: July 23, 2007
Heroic Age Official Guidebook Volume 2 - Release date: August 23, 2007
Heroic Age Official Guidebook Volume 3 - Release date: September 28, 2007
Heroic Age Official Guidebook Volume 4 - Release date: October 29, 2007
Heroic Age Official Guidebook Volume 5 - Release date: November 30, 2007

=== Music ===
==== Singles ====
===== Opening themes =====
Cover of "gravitation"

The opening theme of Heroic Age, "Gravitation", was performed by Angela. An opening theme single, performed by Angela and containing six tracks, was released on May 9, 2007.

- Lyrics: Atsuko
- Composition: Atsuko and KATSU
- Arrangement: KATSU

Track listing

1. "Gravitation"
2. "Storm of Nothingness" (虚無の嵐)
3. "Your breath"
4. "Gravitation" (Karaoke/no vocals)
5. "Storm of Nothingness" (虚無の嵐) (Karaoke)
6. "Your breath" (Karaoke)

===== Ending themes =====
The ending theme of Heroic Age, "Azurite", was performed by Tae Urakabe. An ending theme single containing four tracks was released on May 23, 2007.

- Lyrics: SHUMA (for Azurite)
- Composition and arrangement: YUPA (for Azurite)

Track listing

1. "Azurite"
2. "Starry heavens"
3. "Azurite" (Karaoke)
4. "Starry heavens" (Karaoke)

==== Soundtracks ====
The first original soundtrack album, entitled "Star Way", was released on July 11, 2007. It contains two discs, with the second disc being a Drama CD. The second soundtrack, which was released on September 26, 2007, also contains two discs. The first disc contains 18 tracks, while the second disc is another Drama CD containing the continuation of the story in the first Drama CD.

Star Way
Disc 1

1. "Heroic Age" (ヒロイック・エイジ, Hiroikku Eiji)
2. "Star murder" (星殺し)
3. "Bellcross" (ベルクロス, Berukurosu)
4. "Star way" (スターウェー, Sutāwē)
5. "Nodos Fight" (ノドスの戦い, Nodosu no tatakai)
6. "Scar" (傷)
7. "Everyday life of Age" (エイジの日)
8. "Age and Futo" (エイジとフートォ, Eiji to Fūtoo)
9. "Heart's Rain" (心の雨)
10. "Planet Dyui" (惑星デュイー, Wakusei Dyuī)
11. "Azu Azot Fleet" (アズ・アゾート艦隊, Azu Azōto Sentai)
12. "Spark" (閃光)
13. "Silver Tribe" (銀の種族, Gin no Shuzoku)
14. "Conversation" (対話)
15. "Cemetery Belt" (セメタリー・ベルト, Semetarī beruto)
16. "Argonaut" (アルゴノート, Arugonōto)
17. "One Heart" (心ひとつに)
18. "Tayl and Mayl" (テイルとメイル, Teiru to Meiru)
19. "Intense Earthquake" (激震)
20. "Contract" (契約, Keiyaku)
21. "The Coming of the old Star God" (旧き神の星)

Disc 2

The second disc describes some events surrounding Iolaous, outside the Heroic Age story. The disc also features a bonus track, "Azurite", with vocals by Dhianeila's voice actress, Yui Ishikawa.

Performance

- Takashi Kondō as Iolaous
- Yukari Tamura as Tail
- Rie Kugimiya as Mail
- Kaori Shimizu as Aneasha

Kikan
Disc 1

1. "Heroic Age -Aratanaru Tabidachi-" (ヒロイック・エイジ-新たなる旅立ち-)
2. "Kyouran" (狂乱)
3. "Karyu-don Kantai" (カリュドーン艦隊)
4. "Gekisen no Kodou" (激戦の鼓動)
5. "Eryushion" (エリュシオン)
6. "Shi no Keiyaku" (死の契約)
7. "Dhianeila no Omoi" (ディアネイラの想い)
8. "Kyomu" (虚無)
9. "Koe" (声)
10. "Yuganda Kokoro -Kunou-" (歪んだ心-苦悩-)
11. "Yuuki" (勇気)
12. "Jikuuryuu no Tatakai" (時空流の戦い)
13. "Ankoku no Nodosu" (暗黒のノドス)
14. "Heroic Age -Kagayaku no Hoshi Tatsu Toki-" (ヒロイック・エイジ-輝きの星立つとき-)
15. "Yuganda Kokoro -Kyoufu-" (歪んだ心-恐怖-)
16. "Omowaku" (思惑)
17. "Chitsujo" (秩序)
18. "Heroic Age -Kikan-" (ヒロイック・エイジ-帰還-)

Disc 2

The second disc describes some events surrounding Iolaous, outside the Heroic Age story. The disc also features a bonus track, "Flowery", with vocals by Dhianeila's voice actress, Yui Ishikawa.

Performance

- Takashi Kondō as Iolaous
- Yukari Tamura as Tail
- Rie Kugimiya as Mail
- Kaori Shimizu as Aneasha

== Reception ==
The show was reviewed for THEM Anme Reviews, where the reviewer found it entertaining, but with a number of flaws, awarding it 3 out of 5 stars. The reviewer at The Escapist reviewed the first half, concluding that it is "a solid series with the potential to be something greater", with the shows problems ("the main character is bland and uninteresting and the story a cliché") counterbalanced by a compelling supporting cast and an above-average presentation. A similar lukewarm review was penned by the reviewer from Anime News Network noted that the show is middling (giving it C−), with above average audiovisuals, but under average story, concluding that it "is little more than yet another anime series about a super-special teenager whose amazing powers are destined to save humanity".

In The Encyclopedia of Science Fiction, the show is described as "a minor but distinctive entry in twenty-first-century anime Military SF/Space Opera genres, attempting to recapture the sweeping scope of vintage space operas while for grafting Greek heroic myth onto a fairly orthodox interstellar-war template and playing the result unusually straight.".
