= Pilgrim Jäger =

Japanese manga series

- First tankōbon volume cover

ピルグリム・イェーガー (Pirugurimu Iēgā)
- Genre: Adventure; Historical fantasy
- Manga
- Written by: Tow Ubukata
- Illustrated by: Mami Itoh
- Published by: Shōnen Gahōsha
- English publisher: NA: Media Blasters
- Magazine: Young King OURs
- Original run: 2001 – 2006
- Volumes: 6

Pilgrim Jäger (Note: Jäger means hunter in German.) (Japanese: ピルグリム・イェーガー, Hepburn: Pirugurimu Iēgā) is a Japanese manga series written by Tow Ubukata and illustrated by Mami Itoh. It was serialized in Shōnen Gahōsha's seinen manga magazine Young King OURs from 2001 to 2006, with its chapters collected in six tankōbon volumes. In North America, the manga was published in English by Media Blasters, who only released the first three volumes before canceling it.

== Plot ==
Set in Europe in the year 1521, at the time of the Protestant Reformation, the story follows two women, Adele the acrobat and Karin the fortuneteller. Afraid of being accused of witchcraft, they disguise their special powers, working as common performers (professionisti) to earn enough money to buy indulgences from the Catholic Church that will hopefully free them from their sins. However, their powers soon get them involved in a great religious battle involving the Medici family, the Este family, Girolamo Savonarola's "prophecies," and many others.

Savonarola's prophecies or the Friar's Predictions are the main basis for the series. These prophecies made many predictions about the Catholic Church; even the demise of Rome. Before all these predictions, a battle was to take place.

== Characters ==
Adele
A street performing acrobat that teams up with Karin. Adele also carries around flint to produce flames for her performances (they are said not to burn/hurt those who touch it). She wields a long, cross-like spear that is supposed to symbolize the Alpha Cross or Fennel Stalk. Throughout the first two volumes, there are rumors leading to this spear causing the holders' soul to divide into many. The previous carrier was said to have twelve souls/personalities.
Karin
Adele's traveling partner and a fortune teller. There are sharp daggers, knives, needles, and nails that come out of her hands in order to predict the intensity and importance of what she foresees. Karin was trained by her grandmother. At a young age, her mother sold her to a nunnery where she met Adele. Karin and Adele later left the nunnery due to a fire that may have been started by themselves.

== Publication ==
Written by Tow Ubukata and illustrated by Mami Itoh, Pilgrim Jäger was serialized in Shōnen Gahōsha's seinen manga magazine Young King OURs from 2001 to 2006. Shōnen Gahōsha collected its chapters in six tankōbon volumes, released from May 29, 2002, to November 27, 2006. The series was canceled after the six volumes and Ubukata expressed in an Otaku USA interview a desire to finish it someday.

In North America, the manga was licensed by Media Blasters; they only released the first three volumes, from November 2004 to July 2005, before announcing in 2007 that they had canceled its publication.
