= Fafner in the Azure =

Anime series

- Japanese DVD cover art of the first volume

蒼穹のファフナー (Sōkyū no Fafner)
- Genre: Mecha
- Created by: Xebec; Tow Ubukata
- Anime television series

Dead Aggressor
- Directed by: Nobuyoshi Habara
- Produced by: Gou Nakanishi; Takashi Noto; Takatoshi Chino
- Written by: Yasuo Yamabe (Note: Credited under the pen name Kazuki Yamanobe) (#1–15); Tow Ubukata (#16–26)
- Music by: Tsuneyoshi Saito
- Studio: Xebec
- Licensed by: AUS: Madman Entertainment; NA: Crunchyroll
- Original network: TXN (TV Tokyo)
- English network: US: Funimation Channel
- Original run: July 4, 2004 – December 26, 2004
- Episodes: 26
- Light novel

Dead Aggressor
- Written by: Tow Ubukata
- Illustrated by: Hisashi Hirai
- Published by: Mediaworks
- English publisher: Digital Manga Publishing
- Imprint: Dengeki Bunko
- Published: January 10, 2005
- Manga

Dead Aggressor
- Illustrated by: Mikami Akitsu
- Published by: Mediaworks
- English publisher: Digital Manga Publishing
- Magazine: Dengeki Daioh
- Original run: April 27, 2005 – January 27, 2006
- Volumes: 2
- Anime television film

Right of Left
- Directed by: Nobuyoshi Habara
- Written by: Tow Ubukata
- Music by: Tsuneyoshi Saito
- Studio: Xebec
- Released: December 29, 2005
- Runtime: 51 minutes
- Anime film

Heaven and Earth
- Directed by: Takashi Noto (Chief); Toshimasa Suzuki
- Produced by: Gou Nakanashi
- Written by: Tow Ubukata
- Music by: Tsuneyoshi Saito
- Studio: Xebec
- Licensed by: AUS: Madman Entertainment; NA: Crunchyroll
- Released: December 25, 2010
- Runtime: 88 minutes
- Manga

Dead Aggressor
- Illustrated by: Tomomi Matsushita
- Published by: Kodansha
- Magazine: Monthly Shōnen Sirius (2014–2018); Palcy (2018–2021)
- Original run: September 26, 2014 – August 25, 2021
- Volumes: 9
- Anime television series

Exodus
- Directed by: Takashi Noto (Chief); Nobuyoshi Habara
- Produced by: Gou Nakanishi; Kotaro Sudo; Ryu Hashimoto
- Written by: Tow Ubukata
- Music by: Tsuneyoshi Saito
- Studio: Xebec Zwei
- Licensed by: NA: Crunchyroll
- Original network: MBS, TBS, CBC, BS-TBS
- English network: SEA: Animax Asia
- Original run: January 8, 2015 – December 26, 2015
- Episodes: 26
- Anime film series

The Beyond
- Directed by: Takashi Noto
- Produced by: Koutarou Sudou
- Written by: Tow Ubukata
- Music by: Tsuneyoshi Saito
- Studio: I.G Zwei (Note: Credited as Xebec Zwei from episode 1 to 3 (film 1) and I.G Zwei from episode 4 to 12 (films 2–4). During production of The Beyond, Xebec was sold to Sunrise, and the Xebec Zwei studio was transferred over to Production I.G and rebranded as I.G Zwei.)
- Licensed by: NA: Crunchyroll
- Released: May 17, 2019 – November 5, 2021
- Runtime: 65 minutes each
- Films: 4 (12 episodes)
- Anime film

Behind the Line
- Directed by: Takashi Noto
- Produced by: Go Nakanishi
- Written by: Tow Ubukata
- Music by: Tsuneyoshi Saito
- Studio: Production I.G
- Released: January 20, 2023
- Runtime: 54 minutes

Fafner in the Azure (Japanese: 蒼穹のファフナー, Hepburn: Sōkyū no Fafunā) is a Japanese mecha anime franchise created by Xebec in collaboration with Starchild Records. The story focuses on a group of children who pilot the titular Fafners in an escalating war against giant aliens called Festum. The first series, subtitled Dead Aggressor, is directed by Nobuyoshi Habara and written by Yasuo Yamabe and Tow Ubukata with character designs from Hisashi Hirai and mecha designs by Naohiro Washio. It aired on TV Tokyo from July to December 2004 for 26 episodes. A television special subtitled Right of Left aired in December 2005, a feature film subtitled Heaven and Earth had a theatrical release in Japan in December 2010, and a sequel subtitled Exodus aired on MBS and several other stations for 26 episodes from January to December 2015. Another sequel subtitled The Beyond was released as four films from May 2019 to November 2021. A special episode subtitled Behind the Line premiered in theaters in January 2023. The series heavily borrows elements from Norse Mythology, referencing some of the terminology used.

== Synopsis ==
=== Dead Aggressor (2004) ===
At the beginning of the Dead Aggressor story arc, much of the world has been destroyed by the Festum and the remote Japanese island of Tatsumiyajima (竜宮島; lit. Dragon Palace Island) has only remained unscathed by virtue of an advanced cloaking shield. The island's young people continue with their daily lives unaware of these events, but after many years of peace, a lone Festum discovers Tatsumiya and attacks. The adults activate Tatsumiya's hidden defense systems and attempt to repel the attacker but to no avail. Many of them are killed by the Festum in a process of assimilation. In desperation, they order the deployment of a mecha called the Fafner Mark Elf, but its pilot is killed en route to the hangar. Left with no further options, they send a young boy named Kazuki Makabe as the replacement pilot assisted by Sōshi Minashiro from within the Siegfried System.

The Festum is destroyed, but with Tatsumiya Island's whereabouts exposed, the adults choose to relocate the island. Production is accelerated on additional Fafner units and more children are recruited to pilot them. It is also revealed that the cloaking was not meant to conceal Tatsumiya Island from only the Festum, but from the rest of humanity who would seek to use its technology in the greater war against them.

=== Right of Left (2005) ===
A prequel to the first series. Yumi Ikoma and Ryou Masaoka are children who have been selected to take part in a top secret mission, to be the pilots of the first Fafner combat units; the last chance of survival for the human race. The enemy is ruthless, remorseless and is able to read the minds of humans. Therefore, the details of this mission are kept a secret even from the personnel involved. The young pilots must use all their courage and faith in order to survive and complete their mission or the fate of mankind would be compromised.

=== Heaven and Earth (2010) ===
The year is 2148. Two years after the end of the original Fafner in the Azure TV series, Tatsumiya Island and its surviving residents have returned to some semblance of recovery. However, things have become desperate for our hero, Kazuki; nearly blind now, and partially crippled from his battles with the Festum two years earlier, he clings to the promise his fallen friend Sōshi made to him to return to the island and set things right again. Kazuki's hopes flare when a lifeform is detected within an unmanned submarine that comes floating into Tatsumiya Bay one night, but the person aboard isn't Sōshi; it is a mysterious "boy" named Misao Kurusu who may not be entirely human, and who claims to have been sent by Sōshi. With Misao's arrival, hostilities break out anew between the Human Army and the Festum, and the Fafner pilots are thrown into the most desperate battle of their lives - this time, with the fate of TWO races riding on their shoulders.

=== Exodus (2015) ===
2150 A.D. The fight against the Festum, a silicon-based alien life form that destroyed much of the world, enters a new phase. The first Azure Operation crushed the Arctic Mir, scattering its pieces around the world. Soon those fragments began to act of their own volition. While the majority of the Mir wage war, embracing a hatred for mankind, some of the Festum chose to co-exist with humanity. There were humans who also thought it was possible. Mankind and the Festum, co-existing. The concept questioned the very reason for the war, giving birth to even more hatred. This is no longer simply a fight between humans and the Festum.

Under such circumstances, Tatsumiya Island disappeared from the front lines, going silent. Through the encounter with Misao Kurusu two years ago, the island had the means to converse with the Mir. It gave the island a unique capability. The children of ALVIS, prepared for battle, sought a way to better understand the enemy.

And now, a new chapter is about to begin on the island. A girl who understands the Festum language. A girl the Festum protected. When the two meet, they will open the door to a new world...

== Media ==
=== Anime ===
Fafner in the Azure: Dead Aggressor aired on TV Tokyo from July 4, 2004, to December 26, 2004. It features two pieces of theme music and one insert theme. angela performed the opening theme entitled "Shangri-La", the insert theme "Proof" in episode 15, and the ending theme "Separation". Fafner in the Azure: Right of Left, a 50-minute prequel special to the television series, aired on December 29, 2005. The ending theme "Peace of Mind" for the special was also performed by angela. The TV series was originally licensed by Geneon under the shortened title, Fafner, but has since been out of print. Two OVAs named Fafner in the Azure: Arcadian Memory released in 2005 and 2006 that summarize the series.

A film, titled Fafner in the Azure: Dead Aggressor: Heaven and Earth premiered in Japan on December 25, 2010. Once again, angela performed all theme songs (image, opening and insert) for the film. "FORTUNES" and "Rikai to Hakai e no Prelude (Prelude to Comprehension and Destruction)" are used as the image theme songs for the movie. "Sōkyū (Azure)" is used as ending theme and "Sayonara no Toki Kurai Hohoen de (At Least, Smile When We Are Saying Goodbye)" is used as insert theme for the movie.

A twitvideo post from lead vocalist Atsuko announced that a sequel to the Fafner in the Azure series has been green-lit for production. The announcement was originally made at the live streaming event, Soukyuu Sakusen, which was for the film. The sequel, titled, Fafner in the Azure: Dead Aggressor -EXODUS-, aired on MBS and several other stations from January 8, 2015, to December 26, 2015. It takes place two and a half years after Heaven and Earth. The first episode is extended by 10 minutes on home media.

A sequel, titled Fafner in the Azure: The Beyond, was announced at the Sōkyū no Fafner Soshi Minashiro Birthday Festival in Yokohama on December 29, 2016. A teaser trailer of the sequel was officially streamed on January 6, 2017. A teaser trailer of the sequel was officially streamed on January 6, 2017. Staff from the previous series worked on the production. The series was later confirmed to be a 12-episode anime series, with the first three episodes premiering in theaters on May 17, 2019. Episodes four to six premiered on November 8, 2019. Episodes seven to nine premiered on November 13, 2020. Episodes ten to twelve premiered on November 5, 2021. It was released as "Fafner THE BEYOND" on Crunchyroll on March 25, 2025.

On December 27, 2021, a 53-minute spinoff episode titled Fafner in the Azure: Behind the Line was announced, featuring the returning staff and cast. It premiered in theaters on January 20, 2023. It is set between the Heaven and Earth film and Exodus.

At New York Anime Festival/New York Comic Con 2011, Funimation Entertainment had announced that both the original TV series and the Heaven and Earth film were licensed, and they were released on DVD and Blu-ray in 2012. The series made its North American television debut on the Funimation Channel on October 29, 2012.

=== Light novel ===
A novelization of the Dead Agressor series written by Tow Ubukata and featuring illustrations by Hisashi Hirai was published on January 10, 2005. It was published in English by Digital Manga Publishing on July 22, 2008.

=== Manga ===
Two manga adaptations of the Dead Aggressor story have been released and they both share the same title as the first TV series.

The first one is illustrated by Mikami Akitsu. It ran in Dengeki Daioh magazine from July 4, 2004, to December 26, 2004, and was collected into two tankōbon volumes by MediaWorks. Digital Manga Publishing licensed this manga for release in North America and published the volumes on July 7, 2010, and April 30, 2011.

The second one is illustrated by Tomomi Matsushita. It was serialized in Kodansha's Monthly Shōnen Sirius magazine from September 26, 2014, to February 26, 2018, and transferred to Kodansha and pixiv's Palcy manga app in 2018, where it ended on August 25, 2021. It was collected into nine tankōbon volumes. A "complete version" of the story, adapted from the original anime, its light novel, drama CDs, and stage play. Tow Ubukata supervised the manga, and XEBEC is credited with the original work.

=== Music and Drama CD ===
Numerous soundtracks, drama CDs and character CDs have been released for the series.

Fafner features music composed by Tsuneyoshi Saito and performed by the Warsaw Philharmonic Orchestra.

Japanese band angela consistently write and perform all of Fafner's opening, insert and ending theme songs that achieve strong sales and popularity. They also released a Fafner tribute album titled "Yakusoku" (約束, lit. "Promise") on December 25, 2008, celebrating the series' fifth anniversary.

Type	Date	Title	Artist	Description
Single	May 26, 2004	fly me to the sky	angela	Fafner image song "fly me to the sky"; Fafner insert song "Proof"
Single	August 4, 2004	Shangri-La	angela	Opening theme "Shangri-La"; Ending theme "Separation"
Album	October 27, 2004	Fafner in the Azure Original Soundtrack I: NO WHERE	Tsuneyoshi Saito; Warsaw Philharmonic Orchestra	Background music; Bonus drama CD "No Where"
Album	February 23, 2005	Fafner in the Azure Original Soundtrack II: NOW HERE	Tsuneyoshi Saito; Warsaw Philharmonic Orchestra	Background music; Bonus drama CD "Now Here"
Single	December 22, 2004	Fafner in the Azure Character's Album: Flügel	Makoto Ishii	Kazuki's character song
Single	December 22, 2004	Fafner in the Azure Character's Album: terra	Kōhei Kiyasu	Sōshi's character song
Single	December 22, 2004	Fafner in the Azure Character's Album: azul	Marika Matsumoto	Maya's character song
Drama CD	October 26, 2005	Fafner in the Azure Drama CD vol. 1: STAND BY ME	Tow Ubukata; Various Artists	The story takes place between episodes 2 and 3 of the original TV series.
Drama CD	January 12, 2006	Fafner in the Azure Drama CD vol. 2: GONE/ARRIVE	Tow Ubukata; Various Artists	The story takes place between episodes 23 and 24 of the original TV series.
Single	March 8, 2005	DEAD SET	angela	Right of Left's image songs: DEAD SET; Hana no You ni (花のように, lit. "Like A Flower")
SIngle	December 21, 2005	Peace of mind	angela	Right of Left's theme song "Peace of mind"; Right of Left's insert song "Hatenaki Monologue"
Album	March 8, 2006	Fafner in the Azure: RIGHT OF LEFT Original Soundtrack	Tsuneyoshi Saito	Background music
Single	December 25, 2008	約束 (lit. "Promise")	angela	Fafner's image songs, celebrating the series' fifth anniversary: Yakusoku (約束, lit. "Promise"); innocence
Album	August 25, 2010	Fafner in the Azure: HEAVEN AND EARTH Image Mini Album	angela	Character image songs, including "FORTUNES" (Kazuki's POV) and "Rikai to Hakai no Prelude" (Misao's POV).; Bonus DVD with cast interviews, promo material, series digest
Single	December 22, 2010	蒼穹 (lit. "Azure")	angela	Heaven and Earth's theme song "Soukyuu" (also Sōshi's POV); Heaven and Earth's insert song "Sayonara no Toki Kurai Hohoende"
Album	February 23, 2011	Fafner in the Azure: HEAVEN AND EARTH Original Soundtrack	Tsuneyoshi Saito	Background music
Album	February 11, 2015	Fafner in the Azure COMPLETE BEST ALBUM	Various Artists	Compilation album featuring all character's image songs and all Fafner related songs released by angela previous to EXODUS.
Single	February 11, 2015	イグジスト (lit. "Exist")	angela	Exodus' 1st opening "Exist"; Exodus' 1st ending "An'ya Kōro" (暗夜航路, lit. "Dark Night Route")
Single	November 11, 2015	DEAD OR ALIVE	angela	Exodus' 2nd opening "DEAD OR ALIVE"; Exodus' 2nd ending "Horizon"
Album	February 25, 2015	Fafner in the Azure: EXODUS Original Soundtrack vol. 1	Tsuneyoshi Saito; Warsaw Philharmonic Orchestra	Background music; Bonus content: "Makoto Ishii's Travelogue: Secrets of Warsaw part.1"
Album	March 25, 2015	Fafner in the Azure: EXODUS Original Soundtrack vol. 2	Tsuneyoshi Saito; Warsaw Philharmonic Orchestra	Background music; Bonus content: "Makoto Ishii's Travelogue: Secrets of Warsaw part.2"
Single	May 22, 2015	Fafner in the Azure: EXODUS Character Song: Kazuki Makabe	Makoto Ishii	Kazuki's character songs: FIGHTING; CHAIN OF LIFE
Single	May 22, 2015	Fafner in the Azure: EXODUS Character Song: Sōshi Minashiro	Kōhei Kiyasu	Sōshi's character songs: Licht; philosophia
Single	May 22, 2015	Fafner in the Azure: EXODUS Character Song: Maya Tōmi	Marika Matsumoto	Maya's character songs: Angel arrow; Orange no Kaze (オレンジの風, lit. "Orange Wind")

=== Video games ===
Fafner in the Azure: Dead Aggressor was adapted by Bandai into a video game released for the PlayStation Portable in Japan on January 27, 2005, being one of the first releases for the platform. It follows the storyline of the first season almost directly with two bonus missions and also features new weapons such as the dimension gun.

In 2009, the series made its debut in the long-running Super Robot Wars series as a part of Super Robot Wars K for the Nintendo DS. It returned in 2013 in Super Robot Wars UX for the Nintendo 3DS, which also marks the debut of the series' movie sequel, Heaven and Earth.

== See also ==
- Fafnir - a character in Norse Mythology who turns himself into a dragon to protect its treasure.
- Fenrir - a monstrous wolf in Norse Mythology who is foretold to kill the god Odin during the events of Ragnarök.
- Mjölnir - Hammer of the god Thor, one of the most fearsome weapons in Norse Mythology.
