= Tsuneyoshi Saito =

Tsuneyoshi Saito 斉藤 恒芳
- Born: April 28, 1965 (age 61); Shuzenji, Shizuoka, Japan
- Genres: Video game music, anison, classical music, electronic, instrumental
- Occupation: Composer
- Instrument: Keyboard
- Years active: 1990–present
- Labels: Epic Records Japan; Sony Music
- Website: www.spacecraft.co.jp/saito/

Tsuneyoshi Saito (斎藤 恒芳, Saitō Tsuneyoshi; born April 28, 1965) is a Japanese composer and arranger for anime shows and video games. He composed the original music for the third Tenchi Muyo! film Tenchi Forever! The Movie, the feature anime film xxxHolic: A Midsummer Night's Dream, the Fafner anime series including the original anime series, its feature film Fafner: Heaven and Earth, and its 2014 sequel Fafner: Exodus He composed and arranged the soundtrack for the anime series Dennō Coil, Kamen Rider Kiva, and Idolmaster: Xenoglossia. In video games, he co-composed music for Professor Layton and the Eternal Diva, and co-arranged the music for Final Fantasy VI that appears on the album Final Fantasy VI Grand Finale.

In addition to anime and video game music, he was involved in a Japanese band called Kryzler & Kompany which formed while he was in college. He served as the keyboardist, with Taro Hakase on violin and Yoshinobu Takeshita on bass. Their first eponymous album was released in September 1990 and sold 74,000 copies. Their second, Kryzler And Company #, sold over 81,000 copies. Steve McClure of Billboard wrote that they have become "Japan's unlikeliest pop idols, attracting hordes of screaming fans, a far cry from the decorum and reserve usually shown by Japan's classical music audiences.". The song reached number one on Billboard Japan. The group produced 11 albums before going on hiatus as Hakase pursued a solo career. In February 2015, the group released a new album New World to commemorate their 25th anniversary.
