= Le Chevalier D'Eon =

Japanese anime television series

- The cover of Volume 1 of the Le Chevalier D'Eon DVDs released by ADV Films

シュヴァリエ (Shuvarie)
- Genre: Dark fantasy; Historical fantasy; Thriller
- Created by: Tow Ubukata, Production I.G
- Anime television series
- Directed by: Kazuhiro Furuhashi
- Produced by: Katsuji Morishita
- Written by: Tow Ubukata
- Music by: Michiru Ōshima
- Studio: Production I.G
- Licensed by: AUS: Madman Entertainment; NA: Funimation; UK: ADV Films
- Original network: WOWOW
- English network: SEA: Animax Asia; US: Anime Network; ZA: Animax
- Original run: August 19, 2006 – February 2, 2007
- Episodes: 24
- Manga
- Written by: Tow Ubukata
- Illustrated by: Kiriko Yumeji
- Published by: Kodansha
- English publisher: NA: Del Rey (former); Kodansha USA (currently)
- Magazine: Magazine Z
- Original run: January 26, 2005 – November 26, 2008
- Volumes: 8

Le Chevalier D'Eon (Japanese: シュヴァリエ, Hepburn: Shuvarie; (French "Chevalier"), literally "Knight") is a Japanese anime television series produced by Production I.G based on an original story by Tow Ubukata. The anime originally aired in Japan on WOWOW from August 19, 2006, to February 2, 2007. The story has also been adapted into a manga series written by Tow Ubukata and illustrated by Kiriko Yumeji, which was first published in 2005. The title character is loosely based on the historical figure Chevalier d'Éon, who lived in the middle of 18th-century, pre-Revolutionary France under the reign of Louis XV.

Le Chevalier D'Eon was originally licensed to the North American market by ADV Films, but it became one of over thirty titles transferred from ADV Films to Funimation in 2008.

== Plot ==
The story begins in Paris 1742, when the body of a woman named Lia de Beaumont is found in a casket floating along the Seine. The only clue regarding her death is the word "Psalms", which is written in blood on the lid of the casket. D'Eon de Beaumont, Lia's younger brother and a knight in service of King Louis XV, takes it upon himself to investigate his sister's mysterious death, along with the strange disappearances of a number of French women. By order of the King of France, he is to recover the Royal Psalms which is linked to the mysterious death of his sister and the case of the missing women. At the beginning of his journey to find the Royal Psalms, he is accompanied by a young boy named Robin, appointed to him by the Queen, a gentleman named Durand, who is an old colleague of his sister, and his old master, Teillagory. The four musketeers traverse across France, Russia, and England trying to get closer to the truth and the Royal Psalms. However, it is soon known to them that a fifth member is in their party. Loyalties are tested as they usher further down the path of the Royal Psalms.

== Themes ==
The spirit of determination to live through tragedy by transforming contradiction into a new set of values—instead of letting it ruin you.

— Tow Ubukata, creator

The series' themes center around 18th-century France, which Ubukata believes to have resulted in a new set of cultural traditions as well as several tragedies. According to him, "the problems stemmed from the fact that no one knew exactly which ideas would lead to greater happiness. In a word, they were forced to live under the burden of contradiction." This is what made the Chevalier d'Eon a "fitting figure to cast as protagonist" because he embodied all of the contradictions of that time period, which Ubukata lists as "Wealth and poverty, faith and heresy, diplomacy and conspiracy, king and commoner, even the devastation of war and the flowering of culture." Ubukata also used this theme in conceptualizing the use of psalms as "dark magic". He said that he "hoped that the irony of using the abstract idea of 'prayers to God' to describe evil would be seen as equally tragic by people of many different faiths and religions."

== Production ==
=== Creation and conception ===
toi8 of Studio 4°C was initially asked to work on the series' character designs, but the job was passed on to his wife, Tomomi Ozaki, due to time constraints. According to Ozaki, director Kazuhiro Furuhashi requested that the characters "should not look like manga characters or too real; and not too anime-like," and that he wanted the designs to be faithful to historical details. Ozaki sometimes referred to historical portraits from the series' time period as reference for her designs, as well as actors in Western films, mentioning that she referred to Brigitte Bardot's hairstyles while designing Anna Rochefort's hairstyles, and used Brad Pitt as the reference for Durand.

=== Writing ===
When we work on a series, we often scrape off unwanted aspects of each character as the series progress and the characters develop because we gradually realize the main qualities of each of them. For Le Chevalier D'Eon, I think we almost never removed any content from the main characters' resumes that was set at the start. I feel we were able to keep the intended atmosphere of a cathartic drama of people who were and were not loyal to their country 'on the eve of the French Revolution.' We stayed true to the plot given to us initially and I feel we actually added depth to it.

— Shotaro Suga, scriptwriter

Scriptwriter Shotaro Suga was contacted by Tetsuya Nakatake at the beginning of the project, and agreed to work with them when he was informed that Tow Ubukata and Kazuhiro Furuhashi were taking part in the production. He was unable to work on the project immediately, as he was also working on Eureka Seven at the time. Suga admitted to being nervous about working with Furuhashi, whom he described as an "experienced director" because the other series he worked on (such as Ghost in the Shell: Stand Alone Complex, Blood+, Eureka Seven, and Casshern) were by first-time directors. He described the script readings for Le Chevalier D'Eon as "ever more intense" than his previous projects, and that they all "kept on debating to scrutinize each and every detail." Chief writer Yasuyuki Muto noted that their script meetings lasted as long as twelve hours.

Muto was in charge of the script for eleven out of the twenty-four episodes. Ubukata and Furuhashi provided the ideas for the episodes, which the writing staff then adapted into the scripts. "Director Furuhashi as well as Ubukata-san, who is a novelist, both put a lot of weight on the dialogues", Muto said. Suga commented that "[c]ompared to other works, the script for Le Chevalier D'Eon is enormous", noting that one episode had a one hundred-page script. Muto noted that their main focus while writing was the "...'emotion' of each character". Muto was present during the productions' post-recording sessions, primarily because he believed that it would be easier for the staff to have a writer on-hand in case problems arose during recordings.

According to Furuhashi, the script for the series took about roughly ten months to complete, and that thanks to their collaboration with a novelist (Ubukata), the script contained 30 to 40 percent more information than a regular television script.

=== Design and animation ===
Art director Hiroshi Ono stated that he initially could not make up his mind whether to work on this project or not, saying "The information they gave me was enough to see that this was not going to be a straightforward job. The story takes place in Versailles and stretches from France to Russia and England. This means that you can't reuse the same background elements throughout the series, and instead you have to create new ones for each episode. Traveling stories are always the most difficult projects of all." Ono was responsible for the background designs used in the series, and he used photographs and classical paintings as references. 3D CGI was used in the creation of certain backgrounds and settings for the series, such as the Hall of Mirrors.

toi8 of Studio 4°C took on the role of designing the weapons and props for the series. He utilized different reference materials for his designs, saying that he "relied on images in books and on the web" as well as films such as Fanfan la Tulipe and The Affair of the Necklace. toi8 was initially asked to work on the series' character designs, but the job was passed on to Tomomi Ozaki due to time constraints.

Ozaki noted that Furuhashi requested that the characters "should not look like manga characters or too real; and not too anime-like," and that he wanted the designs to be faithful to historical details. She said that she sometimes referred to historical portraits from the series' time period as reference for her designs, and also cited specific sources for her designs. "For Anna's hair, I imaged Brigitte Bardot's hairstyles. For Count Guercy, I chose Jack Black in School of Rock. Durand comes from Brad Pitt, and Anthony Hopkins in Mask of Zorro was my model for Teillagory", she said.

The color schemes for the characters were decided upon by color designer Idumi Hirose. Due to the constant changes in time and location throughout the series, Hirose said that they sometimes had to use 20 to 30 different color schemes for each character in a single episode. Furuhashi requested that the "color trace" method, a coloring method wherein the solid black outlines are replaced by colored outlines, be used on the clothing of aristocratic female characters.

=== Music ===
Composer Michiru Oshima stated that this is "the first time in years" that she was given the chance to compose pieces that were "very classical". She stated that while she was composing the music for the series, she was "consciously trying to add depth that's typical of European classical music", and that she believed that orchestral pieces suited the series well because the characters "are all serious and weighty."

The song "BORN", composed and performed by Miwako Okuda, is used as the series' opening theme for all twenty-four episodes. The series' ending theme ("OVER NIGHT" by Aya), which is also used for all twenty-four episodes, was specially composed for the project. Aya stated that she drew inspiration from the first illustration she was shown, which was of "D'Eon, splattered with the blood of his victim, [walking] in the burning city of Paris holding Lia's hands."

== Media ==
The cover of volume 1 of the Le Chevalier D'Eon manga. Artwork by Kiriko Yumeji.

Le Chevalier D'Eon was initially developed as a cross-media project that would be simultaneously released in novel, manga, and anime format. The three different mediums each presented a different interpretation of the Ubukata's story and protagonist, but he said that "each version complements the others."

=== Releases ===
Le Chevalier D'Eon aired in Japan on WOWOW from August 19, 2006, to February 2, 2007. Animax also aired the series in Japan as well as its respective networks worldwide, including its English language networks in Southeast Asia and India. The first episode of the series was also screened at the Ottawa International Animation Festival in September 2006.

As of October 2007, Media Factory released the series in DVD format in Japan with twelve volumes that contained two episodes each. The series was originally licensed in North America by ADV Films, but the rights to the series were transferred to Funimation in 2008, along with the rights to several other anime series. ADV Films released the series in six DVD volumes with four episodes as of December 2007. In December 2008, Funimation released a complete box set of the series DVDs, which contains all the episodes in four discs. The first two discs contain commentaries along with some of the series' episodes, and an additional disc with extra content such as promotional videos and interviews with the original Japanese cast is also included. On December 1, 2009, Funimation released a DVD set containing all 24 episodes in the North America.

=== Manga ===
The manga, illustrated by Kiriko Yumeji and written by Tow Ubukata, features a story that is almost entirely different from the anime series. It is described by Ubukata as "a humorous attempt at combining D'Eon de Beaumont, eighteenth-century France, and a superhero story". The story focuses on D'Eon de Beaumont, a police officer who is also a member of King Louis XV's Secret Police (Le Secret du Roi), and his dealings with a cult that sacrifices virgins for their rituals.

The manga was serialized in Kodansha's Magazine Z and has been released in eight tankōbon volumes, with the first volume having been published in October 2005 and the latest volume in September 2008. Del Rey published the first volume of the manga in the United States on June 26, 2007, and has released all eight volumes as of July 27, 2010. Kodansha USA have licensed the manga and are releasing it digitally.

=== Soundtrack ===
The series' soundtrack was released by BMG Japan (now known as Sony BMG) on November 22, 2006. The soundtrack features twenty-eight tracks of background music used in the series as well as the short versions of the opening and ending themes.

== Critical reception ==
Critics praised Le Chevalier D'Eon for its art design and animation. Tasha Robinson of Sci Fi Weekly praised the details in the designs, but stated that "the characters all have a flat-faced samey look; their costumes get far more attention than their faces, and the results are pretty but bland." Theron Martin of Anime News Network said, "Background art varies a little more, from slightly rough to stunningly gorgeous, with some CG-crafted shots of Versailles rivaling even the exquisite detail of Gonzo's best work. Though the series does use some still scenes, neither they nor any other short cuts can be found in the well-choreographed sword fights, where the attention to detail (especially in rare anime shots of critical footwork) and shifting perspectives more than makes up for slight failings elsewhere." Chris Beveridge of Mania.com said that the "detail and apparent accuracy in many scenes is just great to look at". Similarly, Brett D. Rogers of Frames Per Second magazine praised the design and animation, saying that they are "beautifully rendered in rococo and gothic style to create the look and feel of 18th-century France", though also stating that the "CGI is used to good result in reproducing the vast, opulent spaces of Versailles, but the transitions between these effects and the main body of animation are a bit coarse." The series' storyline earned mixed reactions from critics. Robinson says that the series' storyline "falls flat," and is "delivered too rapidly and with little affect." She also compares Le Chevalier D'Eon to GONZO's Gankutsuou, because both series are "heavily talky yet fast-moving enough to be confusing." Martin, however, praised the series' pacing, saying that it is "one of the true keys to the quality of this series."

== See also ==
- Chevalier d'Éon
