= The Price of Smiles =

Japanese anime television series

- Key visual

エガオノダイカ (Egao no Daika)
- Genre: Mecha
- Created by: Tatsunoko Production; Nob-C; Hikaru Yuasa
- Anime television series
- Directed by: Toshimasa Suzuki
- Produced by: Nao Ooji; Reiko Kasai; Junya Matsumoto; Kensuke Sarai; Yuuki Tokushima; Masaru Horikoshi; Kei Nishi; Yutaka Endou; Hiroyuki Saeki; Hiroshi Kawamura; Hikaru Yuasa
- Written by: Shinichi Inotsume
- Music by: Tsubasa Itō
- Studio: Tatsunoko Production
- Licensed by: Sentai Filmworks: SA/SEA: Muse Communication
- Original network: Wowow, Tokyo MX, YTV
- Original run: January 4, 2019 – March 22, 2019
- Episodes: 12
- Manga

Egao no Daika Emotional side
- Written by: Akira Iwaya
- Published by: Beaglee
- Magazine: Manga Ōkoku
- Original run: April 24, 2019 – present
- Volumes: 3

The Price of Smiles (Japanese: エガオノダイカ, Hepburn: Egao no Daika) is a Japanese anime series produced by Tatsunoko Production. The series was created as part of the studio's 55th anniversary celebration.

== Synopsis ==
A kingdom full of smiles on a star far away from the earth. Princess Yūki Soleil is twelve years old and it's about time she's sensitive. She cries, laughs and sometimes flutters every day. Wherever she is, she lives happily in the royal palace.

Faithful vassals always be around Princess Yūki Soleil. Leila Etoile, her educator. Izana Langford, who assists politics. Harold Miller, the president of the Knights. Joshua Ingram, her childhood friend's aide.

Meanwhile, Stella Shining is a 17-year-old, talented and cool soldier. But her smile never ceases. A smile is indispensable for living. This is the story of two girls born on a distant star.

== Characters ==
Yūki Soleil (ユウキ・ソレイユ, Yūki Soreiyu)
Voiced by: Yumiri Hanamori
The young princess and nation symbol of the Kingdom of Soleil who lost her parents when she was just an infant. She thinks it is her king's duty to make herself and everyone smile. She is an energetic girl loved by the people around her.
Stella Shining (ステラ・シャイニング, Sutera Shainingu)
Voiced by: Saori Hayami
A soldier belonging to the Burger Squad of the Imperial Army of Grandiga. She has a high fighting ability and is excellent as a pilot, but she lacks emotional expression. When she interacts with people, she smiles and doesn't show her true feelings to others. She joined the army to live and had no particular purpose to live, but now she is coziness in her platoon.
Joshua Ingram (ヨシュア・イングラム, Joshua Inguramu)
Voiced by: Yoshitsugu Matsuoka
Yūki's childhood friend. A family of knights who protect the kingdom. He is on good terms with Yūki like his sister. He is the best playmate in the kingdom and a good understanding person. He is a bright hot-blooded man. His belief is that if someone has the spirit and guts, he can do something about it. He considers Yūki to be his mission.
Leila Etoile (レイラ・エトワール, Reira Etowāru)
Voiced by: Rina Satō
Yūki's instructor. She is the only scary existence for Yūki. She is knowledgeable and strict in etiquette. She is usually quiet and she is one of the few people in the kingdom to seriously scold Yūki. However, her harshness comes from her affection for Yūki and Yūki will do my best to support her.
Harold Miller (ハロルド・ミラー, Harorudo Mirā)
Voiced by: Nobutoshi Canna
Current Knight Chief. He thinks Yūki like her daughter and gives her a gentle smile. He is an excellent commander who can make accurate decisions on the battlefield. He has been with Izana since he was a military academy.
Izana Langford (イザナ・ラングフォード, Izana Rangufōdo)
Voiced by: Ryōtarō Okiayu
A political officer who is calm, has a clear mind and has excellent ability to grasp the situation. He doesn't like the fight itself, but he thinks the fight will never stop in order to protect the peaceful life of his beloved husband and daughter. He is vulnerable to alcohol. He has been with Harold since he was in the military academy.
Yuni Vanquish (ユニ・ヴァンキッシュ, Yuni Vankisshu)
Voiced by: Makoto Koichi
A pilot from a remote area. Rune's twin sister. She has bright and caring her sister's skin. She loves cute things. She's just that she's a rushing type and her beliefs are fierce. She is reassuring about Rune who supports her. She is a good pilot, but she knows what's going on around her and gives her instructions.
Rune Vanquish (ルネ・ヴァンキッシュ, Rune Vankisshu)
Voiced by: Junya Enoki
A pilot from a remote area. Yuni's twin brother. Unlike his sister Yuni, a young man with a serious and calm atmosphere. He always supports Yuni, who runs alone. He is also an excellent pilot, but he is always supporting his sister and he is good at collaborating with others.
Gale Owens (ゲイル・オーウェンズ, Geiru Ōwenzu)
Voiced by: Takashi Matsuyama
Captain of the newly appointed Burger Squad. He has only survived the battlefield and is an excellent military man as a pilot and commander.
Lily Earhart (リリィ・エアハート, Rirī Eahāto)
Voiced by: Yuki Nagaku
A Burger Squad member who longs for Stella. She is always a bright and unit mood maker. She often plays a supporting role for other members in combat.
Huey Malthus (ヒューイ・マルサス, Hyūi Marusasu)
Voiced by: Toshiki Masuda
A Burger Squad member who has fought with Stella and has an ironic shop set up diagonally. He is an excellent pilot, especially in shooting.
Pearce Thorn (ピアース・ソーン, Piāsu Sōn)
Voiced by: Haruki Ishiya
A serious Burger Squad member with a strong sense of justice. He seeks to prioritize carrying out his mission as a soldier. Due to his serious personality, he is inflexible.
Blake Boyer (ブレイク・ボイヤー, Bureiku Boiyā)
Voiced by: Minoru Shiraishi
A Burger Squad member in charge of pilot and mechanic. He is humble and does not feel much motivated as a soldier. Therefore, he is often warned by serious Pierce, but he doesn't care at all.

== Production and release ==
=== Anime ===
A new original anime from Tatsunoko Production was announced in commemoration for its 55th anniversary. It aired from January 4 to March 22, 2019, on Wowow, Tokyo MX, and YTV. The series is directed by Toshimasa Suzuki, with scripts written by Shinichi Inotsume, character designs by NOB-C and Naoto Nakamura, sound design by Kazuya Tanaka, and music by Tsubasa Itō. The opening theme is "Egao no Kanata" (エガオノカナタ) by Chiho feat. Majiko, and the ending theme is "Kono Sekai ni Hanataba" (この世界に花束を) by Kimi no Orphée. The series aired for 12 episodes. The series is simulcast on Crunchyroll outside of Asia. Sentai Filmworks licensed the anime in North America, the British Isles, and other select territories, and simulcasts the series within these regions on HIDIVE. In Australia and New Zealand, the series streamed on AnimeLab. Muse Communication licensed the series in Southeast Asia and South Asia.

No.	Title (Note: All English titles are taken from Crunchyroll.)	Original release date
1	"The Girl from Soleil"; Transliteration: "Soreiyu no Shōjo" (Japanese: ソレイユの少女)	January 4, 2019
Twelve-year-old Princess Yūki Soleil is starting to take on the responsibilities of leading her kingdom. But when the borderland knights, Yuni Vanquish and Rune Vanquish, are rude to Princess Yūki, her retainer, Joshua Ingram, challenges them to a battle in a simulator.
2	"The Truth of the War"; Transliteration: "Senran no Shinjitsu" (Japanese: 戦乱の真実)	January 11, 2019
In order to hold back the advancing Imperial Army at the border, Grand Master Harold Miller takes the royal flagship to the front lines. Joshua throws himself into his first combat sortie in order to protect Yūki's smile.
3	"The Soldier of Smiles"; Transliteration: "Hohoemi no Senshi" (Japanese: 微笑みの戦士)	January 18, 2019
A soldier of the Imperial Army, Petty Officer Stella Shining always seems to keep her squad at arm's length. When she and her squad are deployed on a mission with their new commander, he wonders what lies behind her ever-present smile.
4	"Choice of Hope"; Transliteration: "Kibō no Sentaku" (Japanese: 希望の選択)	January 25, 2019
Two months have passed since the kingdom and the empire went to war, and the empire continues to advance. As Leila Etoile tries to support the despondent Yūki, she thinks back on the tragedy that started it all.
5	"The Night of the Squad"; Transliteration: "Buntai no Ichiya" (Japanese: 分隊の一夜)	February 1, 2019
To break through a stalemate a stone's throw from the capital, the Burger Squad embarks on a night mission. But when Lily Earhart runs into unexpected trouble, she ends up relaying her past to Commander Gale Owens.
6	"The Crossroads of Fate"; Transliteration: "Unmei no Kirō" (Japanese: 運命の岐路)	February 8, 2019
The Imperial Army approaches Hariant, the capital. The citizens are evacuated, but Yūki chooses to stay, hoping to find a way to prevent massive loss of life.
7	"The Sunflowers of the Palace"; Transliteration: "Ōkyū no Himawari" (Japanese: 王宮のひまわり)	February 15, 2019
The Imperial Army occupies Hariant. Stella and her squad hold a farewell party for their departing teammate, and explore Soleil's royal palace.
8	"The Final Message"; Transliteration: "Saigō no Dengon" (Japanese: 最後の伝言)	February 22, 2019
While Yūki takes command of the Royal Army, Izana Langford tries to smuggle crucial information about the ruined Empire of Verde from behind enemy lines.
9	"The Elegy of Dawn"; Transliteration: "Akatsuki no Banka" (Japanese: 暁の挽歌)	March 1, 2019
With the Kingdom hanging on by a thread, Grand Master Harold ramps up production on the new chrars. But Yūki and Leila pursue a different path based on the data sent by Izana.
10	"The Ignition of Souls"; Transliteration: "Tamashī no Hakka" (Japanese: 魂の挽歌)	March 8, 2019
The Empire surges onward, but life is grim for soldiers on the front lines. As she survives through tough situations with her teammates and commander, Stella's smile begins to change.
11	"The Resolve of Two"; Transliteration: "Futari no Ketsui" (Japanese: 二人の決意)	March 15, 2019
Winter has arrived. Yūki has lost many of those important to her, but she continues to press onward. As the war reaches its final stages, Yūki defiantly claims she will retake Hariant.
12	"The Price of Smiles"; Transliteration: "Egao no Daika" (Japanese: 笑顔の代価)	March 22, 2019
As the final battle rages on, Yūki and Stella arrive on distant foreign soil. Yūki has made up her mind to end the war, but Stella stands in her way.
