= Tenchi Forever! The Movie =

Tenchi Forever!
- Region 1 DVD Cover released by Pioneer
- Directed by: Hiroshi Negishi
- Written by: Masaharu Amiya
- Starring: Masami Kikuchi; Ai Orikasa; Yumi Takada; Kikuko Inoue; Chisa Yokoyama; Yuko Mizutani; Yuri Amano; Yuko Kobayashi
- Music by: Tsuneyoshi Saito
- Production companies: Anime International Company; Pioneer L.D.C.
- Distributed by: GAGA Communications (Japan); Funimation (North America); Madman Entertainment (Australia & New Zealand); MVM Films (United Kingdom)
- Release date: April 24, 1999
- Running time: 95 minutes
- Country: Japan
- Language: Japanese

Tenchi Forever!, also known in Japan as Tenchi Muyo in Love 2: Distant Memories (天地無用 IN LOVE 2! − 遙かなる想い, Tenchi Muyō in Rabu Tsū!: Haruka naru omoi), is a 1999 Japanese anime film based upon the popular Tenchi Muyo! series, and was directed by Hiroshi Negishi. It was released in America under the title Tenchi Forever!, possibly because it was to be the last Tenchi Muyo!-branded product created.

The film is the final story arc of the second Tenchi Muyo! television series, known outside Japan as Tenchi Universe. TMiL2 is also notable for its radically different tone from its source material.

Tenchi Universe excised much of the overt sexuality and violence featured in the OVAs in favor of a more comedy-themed atmosphere. The subsequent movie sequel, 1996's Tenchi Muyo in Love, was, at its core, an action movie. However, Tenchi Muyo in Love 2 is a significant departure from its predecessors; instead of the usual comedy-flavored action, the film is a downbeat melodrama, shedding light on Katsuhito's past, the depth of Ryoko and Ayeka's feelings for Tenchi, and Tenchi's hidden desires.

This film marked the last time Petrea Burchard would voice Ryoko for the English dubbed releases of the Tenchi franchise until Ai Tenchi Muyo! was released in North America in 2018.

The DVD released in 1999 by Geneon, then known as Pioneer, is one of the few released by that company to have THX-certified audio and video.

== Plot ==
The movie opens with a scene that fans know all too well: Ryoko and Ayeka begin to fight over chores, and Tenchi runs into the forest after they demand he makes a choice between the two of them. He stumbles upon a huge tree covered in strange flowers, and suddenly vanishes without a trace.

Tenchi has a strange dream of floating through nothingness while surrounded by the flowers he saw before, and wakes up to find himself a completely different person. He's several years older, has long hair, and lives with a beautiful young woman named Haruna. Tenchi shrugs off his old life as a dream and enters a new one with Haruna.

The film jumps ahead six months. Tenchi's family and friends have been searching in vain for him, and the stress is building. His father Nobuyuki has filed a missing-person report, Mihoshi and Kiyone have infiltrated the Science Academy to look for clues, Sasami has returned to Jurai, and Ryoko and Ayeka have moved to Tokyo to continue the search.

Ayeka and Ryoko are unhappy with their lives, working as waitresses at a small diner by day, and searching for clues about Tenchi's whereabouts by night.

After a chance encounter with Tenchi and Haruna, the girls report back to Washu, who realizes that Tenchi has been drawn into a parallel world very close to ours. A plan to find and bring him back is set into motion.

Meanwhile, Tenchi is beginning to get severe headaches, which for some reason coincide with his fleeting memories of his real life. Haruna becomes very upset when he starts to subconsciously draw crude pictures of Ryoko. To comfort her, Tenchi takes her out to buy engagement rings for one another, and stops for dinner at Ryoko and Ayeka's restaurant. When Ryoko tries to address them, there is no response, and her attempts to touch Tenchi pass right through him, making his headache worse. Tenchi and Haruna fade away to nothingness, leaving Ayeka and Ryoko confused and upset.

Washu and Katsuhito have an encounter in the wilderness, and the old shrine master admits he knows what's happening. Haruna was the name of the woman he left Jurai with, but she died on the way to Earth. The huge tree that Tenchi encountered before he vanished grew from the spot that Haruna's body was buried. Katsuhito explains that her soul must have been very lonely, and drew Tenchi into another world to recapture the love she had lost (due to Tenchi's resemblance to Katsuhito/Yosho at that age). With this new information, Washu finalizes her plan.

With the power of the trees Katsuhito planted over the years, Washu creates a doorway into Haruna's world, and Ryoko and Ayeka enter. Confronting Haruna and Tenchi, they try to bring him back, but his altered memories confuse him, and Tenchi sternly rebukes the two. With her power over the parallel world, Haruna banishes them back to our Earth. Devastated by Tenchi's rejection, Ryoko begins to cry.

Haruna has been draining Tenchi's Jurai Power to keep her world stable, and he begins to feel the effects. The world begins to fade away when Tenchi remembers more about his past, and Haruna cannot hide discrepancies of the "perfect world" from him (such as a maxed-out bank account despite her meager earnings and his lack of a job). Her method of restarting the day (and Tenchi's memories) after something goes wrong stops working just as Katsuhito confronts his past and slashes into Haruna's tree with his lightsword, channeling his essence into her soul.

Haruna recognizes her true love Yosho, and remembers why she took Tenchi away in the first place: as a substitute for Yosho. Yosho and Haruna leave together, Katsuhito reappearing in front of the ruined tree, and Tenchi finally remembers who he is. Without Haruna's presence, her world begins to vanish, and Tenchi has no way of escaping.

Washu can only send one person to rescue Tenchi, and Ayeka tells Ryoko to go. After a bit of relieved banter, Ryoko lifts Tenchi into the sky to teleport them back to the real world, and he looks back down on his false life, "ready to leave it behind". A shot of Haruna's table shows the rings they purchased together, left behind by both individuals as they leave the charade she kept up for so long.

The movie closes as we examine the Masaki household returning to normal life. Tenchi has become young again, his hair short and spiky as it was. Though he does not remember his experiences in the parallel world, he has taken up drawing like his older alter ego, because he likes the way it makes him feel. Just before the credits roll, Tenchi and Ryoko enjoy a quiet moment together as the wind shakes the trees, mirroring a scene involving Tenchi's parents in Tenchi Muyo in Love.

== Tenchi Muyo! In Love 2: Eternal Memory ==
A manga was published around the time that TM!IL 2 was released. Called Tenchi Muyo! In Love 2: Eternal Memory, written by Negishi, the story focused on Sasami and implied that Sasami had a larger role in the movie, behind the scenes. The manga also hinted that perhaps Sasami and Tenchi will have a child in the future, though Sasami realizes that her choices in the manga may or may not change the likelihood of that particular outcome.

This manga was never released outside Japan.

== Music ==
- Music score of Tenchi Forever (Tenchi in Love 2) is composed by Tsuneyoshi Saito.
- Ending theme song: Love Song ga kikoeru [I Can Hear a Love Song] (performed by Anri)
- A few of the musical themes in the movie are based on Chopin preludes. Track #4 of the soundtrack, 異次元 [Ijigen, 'Different Dimension'], is very similar to Chopin's Prelude 4 E-minor, although this is not acknowledged on the packaging. In all, Chopin Preludes Op. 24 Nos. 3, 4, and 17 and Etudes Op. 10 Nos. 3 and 9 are used in the movie
