= Bye Bye, Earth =

Japanese novel series

- First novel volume cover (Kadokawa Bunko edition)

ばいばい、アース (Bai Bai, Āsu)
- Genre: Fantasy
- Novel series
- Written by: Tow Ubukata
- Illustrated by: Yoshitaka Amano
- Published by: Kadokawa Shoten
- Published: December 25, 2000
- Volumes: 2
- Novel series
- Written by: Tow Ubukata
- Illustrated by: Hyung-Tae Kim
- Published by: Kadokawa Shoten
- English publisher: NA: Yen Press
- Imprint: Kadokawa Bunko
- Original run: September 22, 2007 – February 28, 2008
- Volumes: 4
- Manga
- Written by: Tow Ubukata
- Illustrated by: Ryū Asahi
- Published by: Shōnen Gahōsha
- Imprint: Young King Comics
- Magazine: Young King OURs
- Original run: January 30, 2020 – July 29, 2022
- Volumes: 4
- Anime television series
- Directed by: Yasuto Nishikata
- Written by: Hiroyuki Yoshino
- Music by: Kevin Penkin
- Studio: Liden Films
- Licensed by: Crunchyroll
- Original network: WOWOW, BS NTV
- Original run: July 12, 2024 – June 6, 2025
- Episodes: 20
- icon

Bye Bye, Earth (ばいばい、アース, Bai Bai, Āsu) is a Japanese fantasy novel series written by Tow Ubukata and illustrated by Yoshitaka Amano. Kadokawa Shoten have published two volumes in December 2000. A new edition illustrated by Hyung-Tae Kim was published by Kadokawa Shoten in four volumes between September 2007 and February 2008 under their Kadokawa Bunko imprint. A manga adaptation illustrated by Ryū Asahi was serialized in Shōnen Gahōsha's seinen manga magazine Young King OURs from January 2020 to July 2022, with its chapters collected into four tankōbon volumes. An anime television series adaptation produced by Liden Films aired from July to September 2024, with the second season aired from April to June 2025.

== Plot ==
Despite having incredible fighting skills and the strength to wield the enormous sword Runding, Belle Lablac has grown up as an outcast due to being the only human in a world of anthropomorphic animals. Desperate to find a place where she belongs, she goes on a quest to find others like her.

== Characters ==
Belle Lablac (ラブラック = ベル, Raburakku Beru)
Voiced by: Fairouz Ai (Japanese); Megan Shipman (English)
A young girl who wields Runding and the only human in the world. She departs home to pursue the Nomad trials.
Adonis Kuestion (クエスティオン = アドニス, Kuesution Adonisu)
Voiced by: Koki Uchiyama (Japanese); Daniel Van Thomas (English)
Sian Lablac (ラブラック = シアン, Raburakku Shian)
Voiced by: Junichi Suwabe (Japanese); Mike Smith (English)
Belle's master.
Kitty the All (キティ = ザ・オール, Kiti za Ōru)
Voiced by: Natsuki Hanae (Japanese); Kyle Igneczi (English)
Gaf Shandy (シャンディ = ガフ, Shandi Gafu)
Voiced by: Satoshi Hino (Japanese); David Wald (English)
A solist in the Park Town kingdom and one of Sian's students. He helps Belle get situated in town while she pursues her Nomad trials.
Sherry (シェリー, Sherī)
Voiced by: Saori Hayami
Guinness (ギネス, Ginesu)
Voiced by: Junya Enoki (Japanese); Ethan Condon (English)
Benedictine (ベネディクティン, Benedikutin)
Voiced by: Ami Koshimizu (Japanese); Elise Baughman (English)
Doranvi (ドランブイ, Doranbui)
Voiced by: Miyuki Sawashiro (Japanese); Robin Clayton (English)
King Lowhide (ローハイド王, Rōhaido-Ō)
Voiced by: Kenjiro Tsuda (justice), Setsuji Satō (evil) (Japanese); Anthony Bowling (justice), R. Bruce Elliott (evil) (English)

== Media ==
=== Novels ===
At New York Comic Con 2024, Yen Press announced that they licensed the 2007 edition for English publication.

==== 2000 edition ====
No.	Release date	ISBN
1	December 25, 2000	4-04-873245-5
2	December 25, 2000	4-04-873246-3

==== 2007 edition ====
No.	Original release date	Original ISBN	English release date	English ISBN
1	September 22, 2007	978-4-04-472903-5	April 15, 2025	979-8-8554-1430-1
2	October 25, 2007	978-4-04-472904-2	December 30, 2025	979-8-85-541464-6
3	November 22, 2007	978-4-04-472906-6	August 11, 2026	979-8-85-541507-0
4	February 23, 2008	978-4-04-472907-3	—	—

=== Manga ===
A manga adaptation illustrated by Ryū Asahi was serialized in Shōnen Gahōsha's seinen manga magazine Young King OURs from January 30, 2020, to July 29, 2022. Shōnen Gahōsha collected its chapters into four tankōbon volumes, published from January 2021 to September 2022.

No.	Release date	ISBN
1	January 16, 2021	978-4-7859-6842-7
2	January 16, 2021	978-4-7859-6843-4
3	September 30, 2021	978-4-7859-7002-4
4	September 30, 2022	978-4-7859-7241-7

=== Anime ===
An anime television series adaptation co-produced by WOWOW, Sony Pictures Television and Crunchyroll was announced in November 2022. It is produced by Liden Films and directed by Yasuto Nishikata, with assistant direction by Sōta Yokote, scripts written by Hiroyuki Yoshino, character designs handled by Yūki Hino, and music composed by Kevin Penkin. The series aired from July 12 to September 13, 2024, on WOWOW. The opening theme song is "Faceless", performed by ASCA, while the ending theme song is "I LUV U 2", performed by LMYK.

Following the finale of the first season, a second season was announced, with the staff and cast reprising their roles from the series, and aired from April 4 to June 6, 2025. The opening theme song is "Aufheben" (Lift up), performed by Who-ya Extended, while the ending theme song is "MOONWORK", performed by ASCA.
