= Moonrise (TV series) =

2025 Japanese anime television series

- Key visual of the series

ムーンライズ (Mūnraizu)
- Created by: Tow Ubukata
- Original net animation
- Directed by: Masashi Koizuka
- Produced by: Tetsuya Nakatake
- Written by: Masashi Koizuka
- Music by: Ryo Kawasaki
- Studio: Wit Studio
- Licensed by: Netflix
- Released: April 10, 2025
- Runtime: 21–31 minutes
- Episodes: 18
- icon

Moonrise (Japanese: ムーンライズ, Hepburn: Mūnraizu) is a Japanese original net animation (ONA) series directed by Masashi Koizuka and produced by Wit Studio, based on a concept by Tow Ubukata. It premiered on Netflix on April 10, 2025.

== Plot ==
Trapped at the height of a cosmic conflict between Earth and the Moon, Jack (Chiaki Kobayashi) enlists as a scout in Earth's army seeking revenge against the Moon's rebel forces, but ends up discovering an unexpected leader.

== Characters ==
Jacob "Jack" Shadow (ジェイコブ・シャドウ, Jeikobu Shadō)
Voiced by: Chiaki Kobayashi (Japanese); Alan Lee (English)
Phil Ash (フィル・アーシュ, Firu Āshu)
Voiced by: Yūto Uemura (Japanese); Ryan Colt Levy (English)
Osma (オスマ, Osuma)
Voiced by: Kōsuke Takaguchi (Japanese); Cory Yee (English)
Duan (ドゥアン)
Voiced by: Satoshi Yamaguchi (Japanese); Michael Woodley (English)
Inanna Zinger (イナンナ・ジンガー, Inana Jingā)
Voiced by: Arisa Kori (Japanese); Ren Holly Liu (English)
Zowan (ゾワン)
Voiced by: Yuka Terasaki (Japanese); Brittany Lauda (English)
Eric Baker (エリック・ベーカー, Erikku Bēkā)
Voiced by: Yū Kobayashi (Japanese); Caleb Yen (English)
Georg Landry (ゲオルグ・ランドリー, Georugu Randorī)
Voiced by: Katsunori Okai (Japanese); John Omohundro (English)
Rhys Rochelle (リース・ロシェル, Rīsu Rosheru)
Voiced by: Misaki Yamada (Japanese); Courtney Lin (English)
Mary (マリー, Marī)
Voiced by: Aina The End (Japanese); Jenna Z. Alvarez (English)
Bob Skylum (ボブ・スカイラム, Bobu Sukairamu)
Voiced by: Masaki Aizawa (Japanese); Christopher W. Jones (English)
Wyse Crown (ワイズ・クラウン, Waizu Kuraun)
Voiced by: Takehito Koyasu (Japanese); Leilani Barrett (English)
Dr. Salamandra (ドクター・サラマンドラ, Dokutā Saramandora)
Voiced by: Mie Sonozaki (Japanese); Tiana Camacho (English)
Windy Sylph (ウィンディ・シルフ, Windi Shirufu)
Voiced by: Arisa Sekine (Japanese); Frankie Kevich (English)
Novice Harbinger (ノービス・ハービンジャ, Nōbisu Hābinja)
Voiced by: Shin Aomori

== Production and release ==
The series was originally announced on June 8, 2022, to be directed by Masashi Koizuka and produced by Wit Studio, with Tow Ubukata writing the scripts. On September 25, 2022, it was announced Hiromu Arakawa would be designing the characters and Ryo Kawasaki would be composing the music. Originally scheduled for 2024, the series premiered on Netflix on April 10, 2025. Its ending theme song, "Daijōbu" (It's All Right), is performed by Aina the End.

=== Episodes ===
No. overall	No. in season	Title	Directed by	Written by	Original release date
1	1	"The Night it All Began"	Hiroyuki Tanaka	Masashi Koizuka	April 10, 2025
2	2	"A Fateful Day"	Chie Yamashiro	Masashi Koizuka	April 10, 2025
3	3	"An Unexpected Face"	Yasuyuki Ebara	Masashi Koizuka	April 10, 2025
4	4	"What Matters Most"	Shingo Uchida	Masashi Koizuka	April 10, 2025
5	5	"Revelation"	Pei Ni Hong	Masashi Koizuka	April 10, 2025
6	6	"Reunion"	Toshimasa Suzuki	Masashi Koizuka	April 10, 2025
7	7	"People of the Moon"	Chie Yamashiro	Masashi Koizuka	April 10, 2025
8	8	"Mary"	Tadashi Nakamura	Masashi Koizuka	April 10, 2025
9	9	"Unchanging Feelings"	Ryūtarō Awabe	Masashi Koizuka	April 10, 2025
10	10	"Pursuit"	Yasuyuki Ebara	Masashi Koizuka	April 10, 2025
11	11	"Unknown"	Yūta Suzuki	Masashi Koizuka	April 10, 2025
12	12	"Falling Shadows"	Yasuhiro Akamatsu	Masashi Koizuka	April 10, 2025
13	13	"Parting"	Jun'ichirō Hashiguchi	Masashi Koizuka	April 10, 2025
14	14	"The Past and Reality"	Toshimasa Suzuki	Masashi Koizuka and Tomomi Kawaguchi	April 10, 2025
15	15	"Expectations"	Ryūtarō Awabe	Masashi Koizuka and Tomomi Kawaguchi	April 10, 2025
16	16	"Reminiscence"	Shinya Kawabe	Masashi Koizuka and Tomomi Kawaguchi	April 10, 2025
17	17	"Domination"	Shū Honma	Masashi Koizuka and Tomomi Kawaguchi	April 10, 2025
18	18	"Carry On Your Will"	Chie Yamashiro	Masashi Koizuka and Tomomi Kawaguchi	April 10, 2025

== Reception ==
=== Accolades ===
Year	Award	Category	Recipient	Result	Ref.
2026	10th Crunchyroll Anime Awards	Best Original Anime	Moonrise	Nominated	
