= Tow Ubukata =

Japanese writer

- 冲方 丁
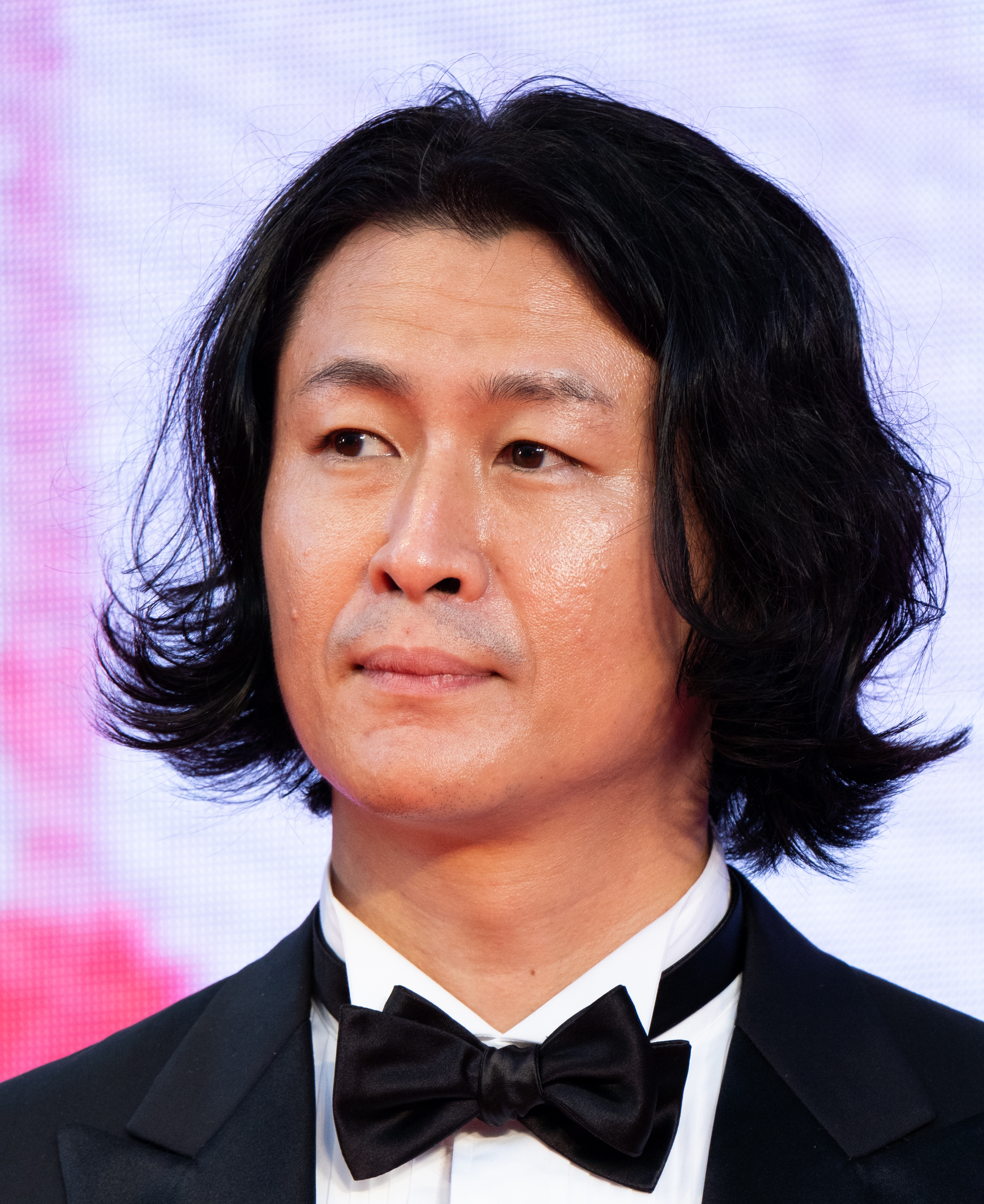
- Ubukata in 2019
- Born: Mineo Fujino (藤野峰男); February 14, 1977 (age 49); Gifu Prefecture, Japan
- Occupations: Novelist; screenwriter
- Writing career
- Language: Japanese

Mineo Fujino (Japanese: 藤野峰男, Hepburn: Fujino Mineo; born February 14, 1977, in Gifu Prefecture), known by his pen name Tow Ubukata (冲方 丁, Ubukata Tō), is a Japanese novelist and screenwriter. He primarily writes fantasy and science fiction. His major works include Mardock Scramble, Le Chevalier D'Eon and Heroic Age. He also did series composition for the Fafner in the Azure series, Ghost in the Shell: Arise, Psycho-Pass 2 and Psycho-Pass 3.

== Early life ==
Ubukata was raised in Singapore and Nepal.

== Career ==
In high school, Ubukata received several writer's awards. In 1996, he debuted as a writer of short stories and won the Kadokawa Sneaker Award with his story Black Season. In 2009, he won the Eiji Yoshikawa Award for New Writers with his story Tenchi Meisatsu. In 2012, he won the Fūtarō Yamada Award for his story Mitsukuni-den.

Ubukata writes for the Japanese visual culture magazine Newtype. His serialized segments, called "A Gambler's Life", are comedic, often-satiric expository pieces. They chronicle his day-to-day experiences and interactions with people, such as his wife. In these segments, he dubs himself "The Kamikazi Wordsmith". These segments were also published in the American counterpart, Newtype USA, which is now discontinued.

Ubukata won the 24th Nihon SF Taisho Award in 2003. Ubukata has written the novelization and the script for the manga version of Le Chevalier D'Eon, and has contributed to the screenplay and the overall story plot of the animated version.

== Personal life ==
On August 21, 2015, Ubukata allegedly hit his then-wife in her jaw and mouth area at their home in Aoyama, Minato Ward of Tokyo, breaking her front tooth. She reported the incident to the police the next day, leading to his arrest on August 24, 2015. Ubukata admitted they had an argument but denied hitting her. On August 26, 2015, Mito City mayor Yasushi Takahashi decided to put NHK's offer to film a live-action taiga drama adaptation of Ubukuta's novel, Mitsukuni-den, in the city itself on hold. Ubukata was released on September 1, 2015, without indictment. The Public Prosecutors Office dropped charges against him in October 2015, with one reason being that his wife did not want to press charges. Following the incident, Ubukata announced that he planned on writing a memoir based on his experiences in jail, titled 9 Days Trapped. In 2016, one year after his arrest and release, Ubukata revealed that he and his wife had divorced, with his wife taking custody of their children.

== Bibliography ==
=== Manga ===
- Pilgrim Jäger, 2001-2006 Six volumes, Art by Mami Itoh
- Le Chevalier D'Eon, 2005-2008 Eight volumes, Art by Kiriko Yumeji
- Sanctuary: The Bakurou Ishin, 2009-2010 Two volumes, Art by Takashi Noguchi
- Gargoyle, 2013-2015 Four volumes, Art by Rururu Kondoh
- Anastasia of the Blood Pact, 2025-Ongoing, Art by Hikaru Tanaka

=== Novels ===
- Kuroi Kisetsu, 1996 (ISBN 9784047870116)
- Bye Bye, Earth, 2000 (ISBN 9784048732451) Two volume republished as four, Released in English by Yen Press in 2025
- Madoromi no Sephiroth, 2002 (ISBN 9784199051043)
- Chaos Legion, 2003-2004 (ISBN 9784829114957) Six volume
- Culdcept Sōden: Storm Bring World, 2003 (ISBN 9784840107402) Two volume
- Mardock Scramble, 2003 (ISBN 9784150307219) Three volume, Released in English as an omnibus by Viz Media in 2011
- Fafner in the Azure, 2005 (ISBN 9784840229111) Released in English by Digital Manga in 2008
- Le Chevalier D'Eon, 2006 (ISBN 9784822217495)
- Mardock Velocity, 2006 (ISBN 9784150308698) Three volume
- Eulen Spiegel, 2007-2008 (ISBN 9784044729011) Four volume
- Sprite Spiegel, 2007-2008 (ISBN 9784829118979) Four volume
- Testament Spiegel, 2009-2017 (ISBN 9784044729097) Five volume
- Tenchi Meisatsu, 2009 (ISBN 9784048740135)
- Mardock Fragments, 2011 (ISBN 9784150310318)
- OUT OF CONTROL, 2012 (ISBN 9784150310721)
- Morainaki, 2012 (ISBN 9784087714609)
- Mitsukuni-den, 2012 (ISBN 9784041102749)
- Hana to Yume, 2013 (ISBN 9784041106044)
- Mardock Anonymous, 2016-Ongoing (ISBN 9784150312237) 11 volumes as of 2026
- Mardock Stories, 2016 (ISBN 9784150312466) Short story: August’s Death Anniversary
- 12 Suicidal Teens, 2016 (ISBN 9784163905419)
- The Ghost in the Shell: Five New Short Stories, 2017 (ISBN 9784063650181) Short story: Springer, Released in English by Kodansha in 2017
- BLAME! Novel: Memories of the Earth, 2017 (ISBN 9784063650242)
- Ikusa no Kuni, 2017 (ISBN 9784062208048)
- Harai, 2018 (ISBN 9784065122426)
- Moonrise, 2018 (ASIN B07M8Z676B) English Ebook prologue
- Kirinji, 2018 (ISBN 9784041072141)
- Kenjusho, 2019-2024 (ISBN 9784163910505) Three volume
- Activator, 2021 (ISBN 9784087717334)
- Tsuki to Hi no Kisaki, 2021 (ISBN 9784569850092)
- Bone Ash, 2022 (ISBN 9784041119952) Released in English by Yen Press in 2025
- SGU Metropolitan Police Department Special Gun Unit, 2023 (ISBN 9784866997957)
- My Little Hero, 2023 (ISBN 9784163916729)
- 11 Rebels, 2024 (ISBN 9784065357088)
- Moonrise, 2025 (ISBN 9784867944905) Three volume
- Project Darkness, 2026 (ISBN 9784041159842)

== Filmography ==
=== Anime series ===
Year	Title	Role	Ref(s)
2006	Fafner in the Azure	Series Composition, Script	
2006	Le Chevalier D'Eon	Original Creator, Series Composition, Script	
2007	Heroic Age	Original Creator, Series Composition	
2013	Ghost in the Shell: Arise	Series Composition, Script	
2014	Psycho-Pass 2	Series Composition	
2019	Psycho-Pass 3	Series Composition, Script	
2022	RWBY: Ice Queendom	Series Composition, Script	
2027	Death Stranding: Isolations	Series Composition, Script	

=== Anime films ===
Year	Title	Role	Ref(s)
2010	Mardock Scramble: The First Compression	Original Creator, Script	
2011	Mardock Scramble: The Second Combustion	Original Creator, Script	
2012	Mardock Scramble: The Third Exhaust	Original Creator, Script	
2015	Ghost in the Shell: The New Movie	Script	
2019	Human Lost	Script	
2020	Psycho-Pass 3: First Inspector	Series Composition, Script	
2023	Psycho-Pass: Providence	Series Composition, Script	

=== Video games ===
Year	Title	Role	Ref(s)
1999	Shenmue	Free Scenario Plotter	
2001	Segagaga	Story	
2006	Culdcept Saga	Script	
