= LMYK =

Japanese singer-songwriter

LMYK (/ˈɛl.ˈɛm.ˈwai̯k/) is an anonymous Japanese singer-songwriter signed to Epic Records Japan.

== Early life and career ==
LMYK was born to a German father and a Japanese mother and is from Osaka Prefecture. LMYK (/ˈɛl.ˈɛm.ˈwai̯k/) are the initials of her real name. She attended an international school and gradually learned English as she was unable to understand others. Although she was interested in both Western and Japanese pop music and singing, LMYK was a shy child and did not sing in front of people. She reluctantly took piano lessons but became attracted to percussion in third grade. She began taking vocal lessons and writing songs while in college in New York, U.S. When she was seventeen, LMYK began playing the acoustic guitar and doing live solo performances at open mic shows. She also uploaded songs to YouTube and Facebook and used Logic Pro to synchronize her voice.

== Career ==
Two years after she began doing music, a friend introduced LMYK to Hikaru Utada's director and producers Jam & Lewis after showing them one of her YouTube videos. She began working with Jam & Lewis. On November 6, 2020, she made her major debut digital single "Unity", which was the theme song for the Japanese release of Chinese animated film The Legend of Hei: The Future I Choose. Producer Team and Jam & Lewis served as a producer. She is signed to "Office RIA" of Epic Records Japan.

On November 7, her first performance on the official YouTube channel. She performed three songs with English covers of his debut song "Unity", "Sorakara" before the release, and Eito "Kosui". The video was shot using Sony's next-generation video system "Warp Square".

On August 11, 2021, the new song "0 (zero)" was released. "0 (zero)" is used a closing theme for the anime The Case Study of Vanitas and an English version was also produced for overseas distribution of the animation. On the same day, Music Video in Japanese and English by the videographer Soh Ideuchi was also released on YouTube. Following the previous work, Jam & Lewis was in charge of producing the song.

In August, she released a remixed version 6 track of "0 (zero)". The remix was done by British DJ and producer Royal-T and Son Of 8. On September 8, a CD single "0 (zero)" with a jacket with an anime pattern will be released as a limited edition. This CD single also includes the debut song "Unity".

In October 2023, LMYK released the song "Perfect World", which was used as the ending theme for the anime adaptation of Firefighter Daigo: Rescuer in Orange (Megumi no Daigo: Kyuukoku no Orange). The CD version was released in November alongside a new version of the music video for "Perfect World".

== Discography ==
=== Studio albums ===
Title	Album details
Desserts	Released: March 29, 2023; Label: Epic Records Japan

=== Singles ===
Title	Year	Peak chart positions		Album
Title	Year	JPN	US World	Album
"Unity"	2020	—	—	Desserts
"0 (zero)"	2021	33	19	Desserts
"Without Love"	2023	—	—	Desserts
