= Houle =

Houle is a surname. Notable people with the surname include:

- David Houle (biologist), evolutionary biologist
- David Houle (futurist) (born 1948), futurist and author
- Dave Houle, high school coach
- Eric Houle (born 1981), Arena Football League kicker
- Hugo Houle (born 1990), Canadian professional cyclist
- Marie-Josée Houle (21st century), Canadian accordionist
- Marielle Houle (21st century), Canadian criminal
- Mariette Houle (born 1954), former Canadian handball player
- Martin Houle (born 1985), Canadian professional ice hockey player
- Réjean Houle (born 1949), Canadian ice hockey forward
