= David Houle =

David Houle may refer to:

- David Houle (biologist) (born 1966), evolutionary biologist
- David Houle (futurist) (born 1948), futurist and author
- Dave Houle (born 1953), high school coach
