= Mariella (disambiguation) =

Mariella is an extinct ammonoid.

Mariella may also refer to:

- MS Mariella, Finnish cruiseferry operated by Viking Line
- "Mariella", song by Kate Nash from her album Made of Bricks

== Given name ==
- Mariella Adani (born 1934), Italian soprano
- Mariella Devia (born 1948), Italian soprano
- Mariella Farré (born 1963), Swiss singer
- Mariella Frostrup (born 1962), Norwegian-born British journalist
- Mariella Lotti (1921–2006), Italian film actress
- Mariella Mehr (1947–2022), Swiss writer
- Mariella Balbuena Torres (born 1979; better known as Mari Apache), Mexican wrestler

=== Fictional characters ===
- Mariella (Black Clover), a character in the manga series Black Clover

Variation: Marilla Cuthbert, a main character in the Anne of Green Gables novels

== See also ==
- Mariela
- Marielle (given name)
- Marella (disambiguation)
