= Marella =

Marela, Marella or Marrella may refer to:

== People ==
=== Surname ===
- Briana Marela, American musician
- Fabrizio Marrella, a professor of international law
- Gliceria Marella de Villavicencio (1852–1929), née Marella, wealthy supporter of the Philippine Revolution
- Joey Marella (1963–1994), American wrestling referee
- Michel Marella (born 1946), French footballer
- Olinto Marella (1882–1969), Italian Roman Catholic priest
- Paola Marella (1963–2024), Italian television presenter
- Paolo Marella (1895–1984), Italian cardinal
- Robert Marella (1937–1999), American professional wrestler

=== Given name ===
- Marella Agnelli (born 1927), Italian socialite and fashion and style icon, wife of industrialist Gianni Agnelli
- Marella Mamoun (born 1982), Syrian swimmer
- Marella Salamat (born 1993/1994), Filipina cyclist

=== Ring name ===
- Santino Marella or Marela, ring names of Canadian professional wrestler and judoka Anthony Carelli (born 1974)

== Other uses ==
- Marela, a town and sub-prefecture in Guinea
- Marela (butterfly), a genus of butterfly of the Eudaminae subfamily
- Marrella, an ancient arthropod
- Marella Cruises, a British cruise line
- Marella Redek, a character in the teen novel series Keeper of the Lost Cities by Shannon Messenger

== See also ==
- Morella (disambiguation)
- Mariella (disambiguation)
