= Morello =

Morello may refer to:

- The Mysterious Geographic Explorations of Jasper Morello, 2005 Australian short film, whose first episode is titled: "Jasper Morello and the Lost Airship"
- Morello cheese, an Italian sheep cheese made from goat's milk
- Monte Morello, highest mountain (3065 ft.) in the Florentine valley, Italy
- Morello (surname), list of people with the surname
- Morello cherry, a cultivar and a cultivar group of the sour cherry
- Morello crime family, Sicilian immigrants and founders of the American mafia in New York
- Morello, racing horse of Lorenzo de Medici

== See also ==
- Morella (disambiguation)
