= Morello (surname) =

Morello is a surname. Notable people with the surname include:

- Andrea Morello (born 1972), Australian physicist
- Celeste Anne Morello, American historian and criminologist
- Dario Morello (born 1968), Italian footballer
- Davide Morello (born 1978), Italian footballer
- Edward Morello, British politician
- Enrico Morello (born 1977), Italian footballer
- Giuseppe Morello (1867–1930), mobster
- Giuseppe Morello (footballer) (born 1985), Swiss-Italian
- Joe Morello (1928–2011), jazz drummer
- Josephine A. Morello, criminologist
- Lorna Morello, fictional character
- Martín Morello (born 1983), Argentine footballer
- Mary Morello (1923–2026), American activist
- Nicholas Morello (1890–1916), mobster
- Ricardo Morello (born 1943), Argentine swimmer
- Steven J. Morello, American lawyer
- Tom Morello (born 1964), guitarist

== See also ==
- Merello
- Morella (disambiguation)
- Morello crime family, Sicilian founders of the US mafia
