= Marielle (given name) =

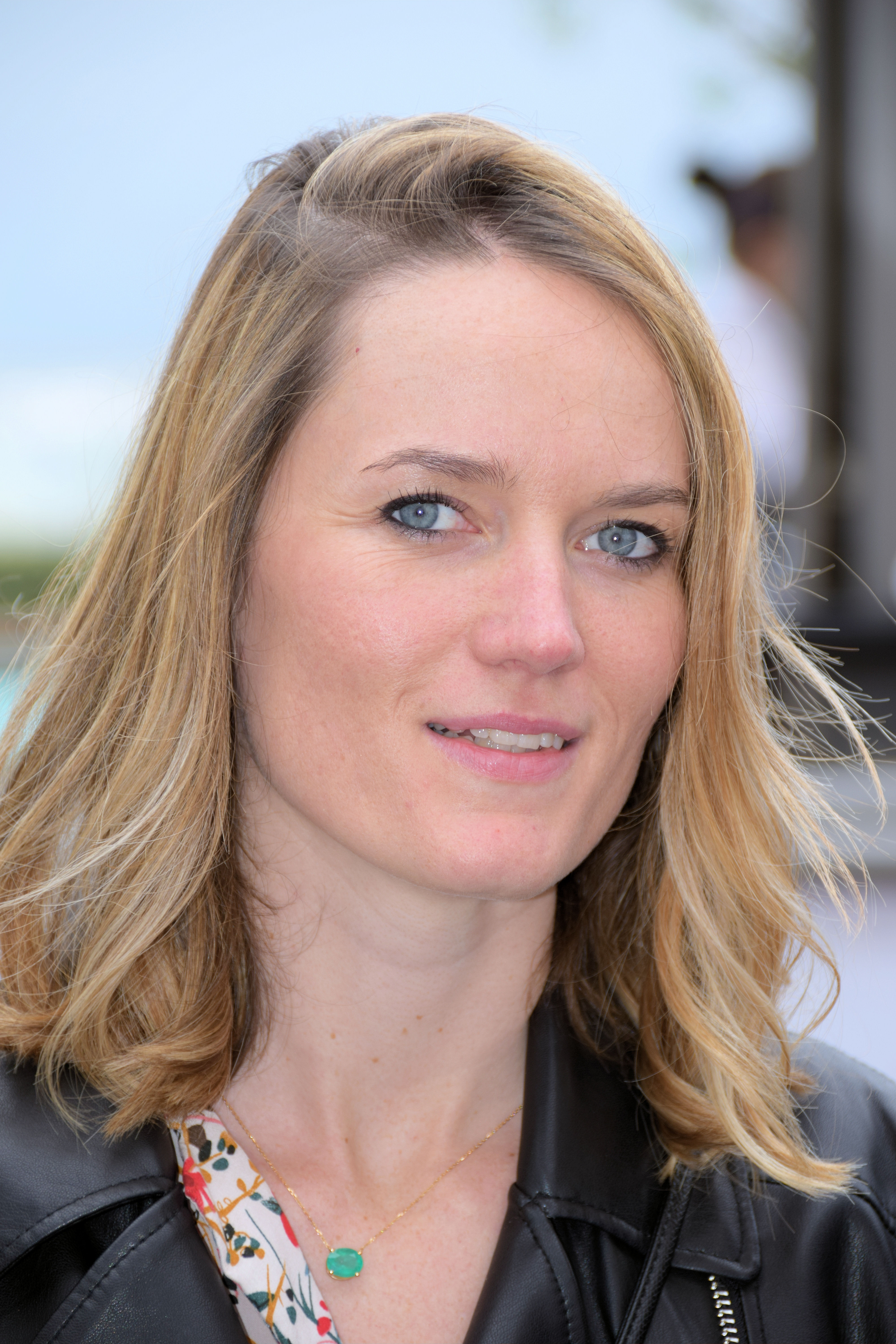
Marielle Gautier

Marielle is a French female name, a diminutive of Marie. Notable people with the name include:

- Marielle Franco, Brazilian politician and human rights activist
- Marielle Gallo (born 1949), French politician and Member of the European Parliament
- Marielle Goitschel (born 1945), former French alpine skier
- Marielle Houle, Canadian woman who helped her ailing son Charles Fariala commit suicide
- Marielle Jaffe (born 1989), American model and actress
- Katia and Marielle Labèque, French sisters forming a piano duo
- Marielle Lahti (born 1969), Swedish politician
- Marielle de Sarnez (1951–2021), French politician and Member of the European Parliament
- Jean-Pierre Marielle (1932-2019), French actor

== See also ==
- Mariella (disambiguation)
- Mariel (given name)
