= Olinto =

Olinto may refer to:

== People ==
=== Surname ===
- Antônio Olinto dos Santos Pires (1860-1925), Brazilian politician
- Antônio Olinto Marques da Rocha (1919-2009), Brazilian writer
- Claudio Olinto de Carvalho (1942-2016), also known as Nené, Brazilian footballer
- Angela Olinto (1961-), astrophysicist

=== Given name ===
- Olinto De Pretto (1857-1921), Italian scientist
- Olinto Marella (1882-1969), Italian priest
- Olinto Sampaio Rubini (1934-2012), also known as Rubini, Brazilian footballer
- Olinto Silva (born 1960), Venezuelan cyclist

== Places ==
- Antônio Olinto, Paraná, Brazil
