= Bakuon!! =

Japanese manga series and its adaptations

- Cover of Bakuon!! volume 1 by Akita Shoten

ばくおん！！
- Genre: Sports (motorcycle racing), comedy
- Manga
- Written by: Mimana Orimoto
- Published by: Akita Shoten
- Magazine: Young Champion Retsu
- Original run: February 2011 – present
- Volumes: 18
- Original video animation
- Directed by: Junji Nishimura
- Written by: Kurasumi Sunayama
- Music by: Ryosuke Nakanishi
- Studio: TMS/8Pan
- Released: March 18, 2016 – December 20, 2016
- Runtime: 24 minutes
- Episodes: 2
- Anime television series
- Directed by: Junji Nishimura
- Produced by: Yosuke Tsuruki; Takahashi Kazuaki; Meiji Takuo
- Written by: Kurasumi Sunayama
- Music by: Ryosuke Nakanishi
- Studio: TMS/8Pan
- Licensed by: NA: Sentai Filmworks; UK: MVM Entertainment
- Original network: Tokyo MX, Sun TV, BS11, Animax
- Original run: April 5, 2016 – June 21, 2016
- Episodes: 12
- Manga

Bakuon!! - Amano Onsa no Nikoichi Hanjōki
- Written by: Yasuhiro Makino
- Published by: Akita Shoten
- Magazine: Champion Cross
- Original run: April 17, 2018 – September 2018
- Volumes: 1
- Manga

Bakuon!! - Suzunoki Rin no Yabō
- Written by: Akira Aoi
- Published by: Akita Shoten
- Magazine: Champion RED
- Original run: May 19, 2018 – October 19, 2018
- Volumes: 1
- Manga

Bakuon!! Taiwan-hen
- Written by: Guiya О̄ta
- Published by: Akita Shoten
- Magazine: Bessatsu Young Champion
- Original run: November 5, 2019 – August 1, 2023
- icon

Bakuon!! (ばくおん!!; lit. 'Roar!') is a Japanese manga series by Mimana Orimoto. The series began serialization in Akita Shoten's seinen manga magazine Young Champion Retsu from February 2011 and has been collected in eighteen tankōbon volumes as of July 2025. An anime television series adaptation by TMS Entertainment/8Pan aired between April and June 2016.

== Plot ==
The series takes place at Okanoue Girls' High School (丘乃上女子高等学校, Okanoue Joshikōtōgakkō), where girls are permitted to ride motorcycles to school, and follows Hane Sakura, a cheerful freshman who becomes awed after seeing another student ride a bike to school. Taking an interest, Hane joins her school's motorcycle club and gets a motorcycle license. After buying her own bike, Hane begins her exciting, two-wheeled, motorized high-school life along her new friends Onsa Amano, Rin Suzunoki, Raimu Kawasaki and Hijiri Minowa.

== Characters ==
=== The Motorcycle Club ===
Hane Sakura (佐倉 羽音, Sakura Hane)
Voiced by: Reina Ueda
The friendly, kindhearted main protagonist, who rides a pink-colored Honda CB400SF Hyper VTEC Spec III.
Rin Suzunoki (鈴乃木 凜, Suzunoki Rin)
Voiced by: Nao Tōyama
A blonde and busty girl who wears her hair in pigtails and is an avid fan of Suzuki motorcycles, to the point that she gets angry when someone belittles any of their models, no matter how weird they look, and has troubles riding bikes from any other company. She rides a Suzuki GSX400S Katana which belonged to her father. Despite not being an official member of the club, Rin always accompanies the others with their activities nonetheless. Rin works part-time as a pizza delivery person.
Onsa Amano (天野 恩紗, Amano Onsa)
Voiced by: Yumi Uchiyama
A wild-hearted, tomboyish girl whose family runs a bike shop. She rides a Yamaha SEROW225W put together with parts from two other broken bikes.
Hijiri Minowa (三ノ輪 聖, Minowa Hijiri)
Voiced by: Rikako Yamaguchi
A wealthy girl in glasses who dreams of becoming a rebel and delinquent, but her kind nature usually leads her to do otherwise. Prior to turning sixteen and becoming old enough to ride a bike, she rides in a sidecar alongside her butler, Hayakawa. After turning sixteen, she obtains a moped license and rides a Honda Super Cub outfitted with a cattle skull and training wheels, until she properly learns to ride and switches to a customized Ducati 1199 Panigale S, tuned down to attend the Japanese regulations that ban minors from riding bikes with displacements bigger than 400 cc.
Raimu Kawasaki (川崎 来夢, Kawasaki Raimu)
Always wearing a helmet, Raimu never talks and her face is never shown, in a fashion similar to The Stig. She acts as the big sister figure of the group, but in reality, Raimu is actually a seasoned biker who has been in the school for at least 20 years (her actual age is unknown but the principal calls her "Raimu-senpai") and has re-enrolled using a false 18-year-old student ID at the school principal's request to keep an eye on the members when they decided to reform the motorcycle club, which was disbanded twenty years ago after a serious accident involving Raimu during a race. Her surname is actually unknown, as she uses a false one on her ID taken from her bike, a Kawasaki Ninja ZX-12R.
Chisame Nakano (中野 千雨, Nakano Chisame)
Voiced by: Ibuki Kido
The newest member of the club, Chisame is a prodigy with racing motorcycles, but has a serious height complex due to her petite figure. She rides a Honda NSF100 in races and her father's Honda PCX 150 scooter in streets, due to her belief that bikes are not meant for roads.

=== Other characters ===
Yume Sakura (佐倉 由女, Sakura Yume)
Voiced by: Azusa Tadokoro
Hane's younger sister, who seems to be more responsible and level-headed than her.
Hayakawa (早川)
Voiced by: Unshō Ishizuka
A butler who serves the Minowa family. Despite having the appearance of an elderly male butler, Hayakawa has the appearance of a girl in their youth. Hayakawa rides a Ducati 750SS Imola Replica with a sidecar that Hijiri rides in prior to obtaining her license.
Tazuko (たづ子)
Voiced by: Yōko Hikasa
The principal of Okanoue Girls High School and an old friend of Raimu, who is older than her. She later buys herself a BMW K1300R.
Onsa's Father (恩紗の父, Onsa no Chichi)
Voiced by: Mitsuo Iwata
Onsa's father who runs a used bike shop that runs some shift business, much to Onsa's dismay.
Rin's Father (凜の父, Rin no Chichi)
Voiced by: Shinichiro Miki
Rin's father who is always seen wearing a helmet. Like Rin, he is also a Suzuki fan, but not as passionately as her. He used to ride the same Suzuki GSX400S Katana that now belongs to Rin, and now owns a Suzuki 1135R Katana Yoshimura that his daughter won for him from an essay contest. He has the tendency to be reckless and ends up getting into accidents frequently.
Kinya Nakano (中野 欽矢, Nakano Kinya)
Voiced by: Junichi Suwabe
Chisame's father, he is a famous moto GP racer, also known as the "Handsome racer" and based on Shinya Nakano. He rides a Honda CBR1000RR.
Akina Nakano (中野 アキナ, Nakano Akina)
Voiced by: Kana Marutsuka
Chisame's mother, she was a member of the motorcycle club 20 years before and used to hang out with Tazuko and Raimu.
Enko Saruyama (猿山 猿子, Saruyama Enko)
Voiced by: Kazusa Aranami
The motorcycle club's adviser who has bad luck with men. She also has the habit of attacking other girls (including her students) when drunk and rides a 50cc bike.
Baita (バイ太)
Voiced by: Kikuko Inoue
A Honda CB400SF training motorcycle Hane rode during her license examination and which could somehow communicate with her, giving her hints. Baita talks with a feminine voice as she claims that she was emasculated due to being tuned down for training use only. After Hane got her license, Baita was retired, but satisfied that Hane was the 1000th student that lost her "virginity" with her. Hane's friendship with Baita is what inspired her choice of personal bike.

== Media ==
=== Manga ===
Two spin-off manga were announced in the May 2018 issue of Young Champion Retsu. The first spin-off titled Bakuon!! - Amano Onsa no Nikoichi Hanjōki (Bakuon!! - A Record of Onsa Amano's Thriving Jury Rigging), centers on the character Onsa Amano and began serialization in Akita Shoten's Champion Cross website on April 17, 2018. The second spin-off titled Bakuon!! - Suzunoki Rin no Yabō (Bakuon!! - Rin Suzunoki's Ambition), centers on the character Rin Suzunoki and will begin serialization in Akita Shoten's Champion RED magazine on May 19. A third spin-off manga titled Bakuon!! Taiwan-hen was serialized in Akita Shoten's Bessatsu Young Champion magazine from November 5, 2019 to August 1, 2023.

=== Anime ===
An anime television series adaptation by TMS Entertainment aired in Japan between April 5, 2016, and June 21, 2016, and was simulcast by Crunchyroll. The series was directed by Junji Nishimura with scripts written by Kurasumi Sunayama and music composed by Ryosuke Nakanishi. An original video animation was bundled with the seventh manga volume on March 18, 2016. A second original video animation was bundled with the ninth manga volume on December 20, 2016. The opening theme is "FeelXAlive" by Sayaka Sasaki while the ending theme is "Buon! Buon! Ride On!!" (ぶぉん! ぶぉん! らいど・おん!, Buon! Buon! Raido On!) by Reina Ueda, Yumi Uchiyama, Nao Tōyama, and Rikako Yamaguchi. Sentai Filmworks acquired the license for the North American rights and released the series on DVD and Blu-ray in August 2017. Universal Pictures originally announced that they would release the series in the UK, however, it was later announced that MVM Entertainment will be releasing the series.

==== Episode list ====
No.	Title	Original release date
OVA	"Bakuon!!" "Bakuon!!" (Japanese: ばくおん!!)	March 18, 2016
While taking a drive on the highway to try a "100-mile blend" of coffee, the girls stop by a service area, where they find cans of coffee with motorbike figurines included. Rin manages to obtain a figure of her Katana, only for it to get run over. Later on, everyone's bikes simultaneously break down due to an alleged curse, but they are soon aided by Raimu. Onsa becomes upset when she discovers the café serving the blend has been shut down, but Hane cheers her up with a can of coffee she had saved during their 100-mile journey. Afterwards, the girls enjoy a hot spring before returning to buy Rin a new figurine.
1	"Club Registration!!" "Nyūbu!!" (Japanese: にゅうぶ!!)	April 5, 2016
On her first day at Okanoue Girls' High School, a school that allows students to ride motorcycles, Hane Sakura takes interest in her classmate, Onsa Amano, after seeing her ride her bike to school. The two go to the school's Bike Club, whose only club member is a silent girl in a helmet named Raimu Kawasaki, who takes Hane for a ride on her Kawasaki ZX-12R. After joining the club alongside Onsa, Hane applies for a motorcycle license, initially struggle with lifting a bike but managing to pull it off after seemingly hearing a voice coming from her bike. During her lessons, Hane comes across another classmate, Rin Suzunoki, who takes her and the others to a bike shop to pick out a bike, only to argue with Onsa when she disses her taste in Suzuki bikes.
2	"School!!" "Gakkō!!" (Japanese: がっこう!!)	April 12, 2016
As Rin manages to get her bike license, she remains angry at Onsa over her prejudice towards her Katana, but is awed by Hane's honest compliments. Later, a freshman named Hijiri Minowa comes to join the bike club, giving Hane the idea to have Onsa and Rin settle their dispute with a chicken race. Though Onsa and Rin stop in order to keep their bikes safe, Hijiri and her butler Hayakawa go full force against Raimu. On the day of her license exam, Hane becomes nervous when she has to ride a different bike than from her lessons, but Hijiri and the others manage to cheer her on, allowing her to successfully pass her exam.
3	"Debut!!" "Debyū!!" (Japanese: でびゅー!!)	April 19, 2016
With Hane now having her license, the girls visit the Nicoichi Motors used bike store, which turns out to be Onsa's family business. Despite the poor condition of most of the bikes on sale, Hane decides to buy a pink Honda CB400SF Hyper VTEC Spec III that catches her eye. Later, the girls overhear Rin being cheerful after a microphone is installed in her helmet, encouraging her to join them on their trip. Afterwards, the girls learn that the Bike Club has been defunct for twenty years and look to getting it reapproved, while Raimu and school principal Tazuko reminisce about how it came to be defunct in the first place. After Raimu promises to protect the other girls from harm, Tazuko presents Raimu with a new student ID and has the Bike Club officially reinstated.
4	"Hot Springs!!" "Onsen!!" (Japanese: おんせん!!)	April 26, 2016
The girls plan a trip to Hokkaido, with Rin reminiscing about when she went with her father as a child. After the girls barely miss their ferry in Oarai, the girls decide to race to Aomori in order to catch another one. As Hane gets left behind, she comes across a peculiar biker with a halo who she helps get to a gas station. After receiving a supposed Holy Grail from the biker, Hane finds herself in Aomori ahead of her friends. Everyone soon arrives in Hokkaido and enjoys a dip in a hot spring the next day, where Rin discovers she has a Suzuki-shaped mark on her bottom.
5	"Touring!!" "Tsūringu!!" (Japanese: つーりんぐ!!)	May 3, 2016
While heading up north, Rin attempts to go at her maximum speed but gets stopped by some foxes, managing to stop herself from running them over. The girls soon reach Cape Soya, where they come across their teacher, Enko Saruyama, who is heartbroken over a recent breakup. Needing an advisor for the Bike Club, the girls try to cheer her up only to become subjected to her drunken behavior. Upon returning home, the girls try washing their bikes in a rather dubious manner.
6	"Prep!!" "Junbi!!" (Japanese: じゅんび!!)	May 10, 2016
As the Bike Club makes plans to hold a race during the upcoming school festival, Tazuko recalls how Raimu won a lot of money through betting only to spend it on a load of bikes her friends considered to be ugly. Later, Hane learns about the various ways people mod their bikes and the difference they actually make. Put in charge of designing the race, Hijiri decides to add betting and a cash prize to make it more interesting. Meanwhile, Onsa receives a modded Yamaha TZR250 3MA from her father, discovering it to be more powerful than its reputation suggests.
7	"Cultural Festival!!" "Bunkasai!!" (Japanese: ぶんかさい!!)	May 17, 2016
With the culture festival underway, the girls tour the school in order to advertise the bike derby. As the students place bets on which rider they think she'll win, Tazuko places a large bet on Raimu, who ends up crashing at the start line, leaving Hane, Onsa, and Rin to continue the race. Raimu soon gets back up and starts catching up to the others as they approach the final lap, leading to a photo finish. As Rin is announced as the winner, a friend of Hane's younger sister Yume shows interest in enrolling in the school.
8	"Winter Break!!" "Fuyuyasumi!!" (Japanese: ふゆやすみ!!)	May 24, 2016
With her birthday approaching, Hijiri reveals she has a motorcycle license purchased from a foreign country, but Onsa destroys it when it becomes apparent she has no knowledge of traffic rules. The girls soon have her begin practising on a Honda Super Cub, but after several failed attempts, Hijiri takes a mallet to it. After discovering it can survive a whopping, however, Hijiri decides to stick with it and obtains a moped license. Later, as the girls get together for a Christmas party, Hane decides to play the role of Santa to deliver a present to Rin, who had to work. Afterwards, the girls go on a drive to watch the first sunrise of the new year, where Hane faces trouble after drawing a bad luck fortune at the shrine.
9	"New Classmate!!" "Shinnyūsei!!" (Japanese: しんにゅうせい!!)	May 31, 2016
Chisame Nakano, Yume's friend who has enjoyed bikes since she was a child, takes the entrance exam for Okanoue, struggling to keep her mind away from bikes during the test. Later, as both Chisame and Yume make it into Okanoue, Raimu overhears her underclassmen planning a surprise for her graduation, ultimately deciding to repeat yet another year in order to protect them. At the start of the new school year, the Bike Club has to find a way of promoting their club during orientation without bringing a bike onstage. Despite their presentation coming off a little awkward, it resonates with Chisame, who gives her own addition to the presentation.
10	"Juniors!!" "Kōhai!!" (Japanese: こうはい!!)	June 7, 2016
The girls come across Chisame trying a bike game at the arcades, where Hane invites her on a tandem ride. The next day, Chisame becomes worried about exposing her complex over having short legs that can't reach the ground easily, but the girls show her how bikes can be customised to suit the rider's needs and just ride what she wants to ride. Touched by their words, Chisame decides to join the Bike Club and apply for a motorcycle license, though finds that she can't pass the one-off exam on her skills as a minibike racer alone. Chisame begins attending driving school alongside Hijiri, but struggles to actually learn anything due to the instructors assuming she already has the experience. After crashing as a result of shifting the wrong way, Chisame breaks down and confides in Hijiri.
11	"Bicycles!!" "Jitensha!!" (Japanese: じてんしゃ!!)	June 14, 2016
A bitter cyclist riding an expensive bicycle tries to race against Onsa and Hane on their motorcycles, only to crash into the limo of someone even richer. Later, Onsa inadvertently drinks some of Rin's drool and gets infected with a rare disease that causes her to become obsessed with Suzuki bikes. After Chisame gets her license, the other girls argue over what kind of bike she should buy. In the end, Chisame decides to use her father's Honda PCX scooter.
12	"A World of What-Ifs!!" "Moshimo no Sekai!!" (Japanese: もしものせかい!!)	June 21, 2016
When Hane damages her bike's fuel tank while at Onsa's place, she comes across a replacement tank which turns out to be what's left of Baita. Later, after a run-in with the haloed rider, Hane finds herself in a world where motorcycles don't exist and all her friends ride bicycles instead. Thankfully, this turns out to be a dream and she soon returns to a world of motorcycling friends.
OVA	"Maid" "Meido" (Japanese: メイド)	December 20, 2016
After Hijiri finally obtains her own motorcycle license, she has one final ride with Hayakawa, who experiences mysterious rejuvenating effects and reverts to a younger age, revealing his true identity as a female maid. Confused by the circumstances, Hijiri attempts to hide Hayakawa's identity when the others come over to visit to see her new bike. Jealous of Hayakawa getting everyone's attention, Hijiri rides off on her own, only to run into some trouble when her bike topples over. Remembering that which is most important, Hayakawa returns to her normal appearance as an elderly butler to help Hijiri.

== Reception ==
=== Previews ===
Anime News Network had five editors review the first episode of the anime: Nick Creamer was positive towards the comedic content having solid visual and verbal jokes being delivered through humorous character expressions and voice acting; Theron Martin was initially entertained by the amusing cast and intricate motorbike knowledge but was distracted by the fanservice involving the girls' figures; Rebecca Silverman praised Onsa Amano for her "delightfully retro [character] design" and flighty yet endearing personality, and the surprisingly funny sex humor being delivered by Baita but found both Sakura and Rin to be unbearable and lacking interesting qualities to them; Lynzee Loveridge was also positive towards Onsa and the driver's ed bike providing decent comedy but felt the rest of the episode had an unspectacular cast, generic character designs (outside of Onsa's) and dull non-motorbike humor, saying the anime will appeal more to that specific subset of gearheads than a general audience. The fifth reviewer, Jacob Hope Chapman, found the series to be more of an "Akamatsu-style 90s harem comedy than K-On! on motorcycles", criticizing the humorless jokes, overbearing and screechy female characters, and lackluster production for delivering "garish flat designs" and lazily repeated animation, concluding that: "Bakuon!! has that unique kind of lameness where it feels like it's not really made for any audience in 2016. If you were hoping for moe motorcycles, there's no innocent charm to be found here, and if you just want to see some fanservice, you'll probably want to hold out for a show with better drawings."

=== Series ===
Stig Høgset at THEM Anime Reviews was critical of the "cartoonish caricatures" and the last episode being disappointing with its signature humor being replaced with a flat joke but gave praise to the main cast for their charm and personalities being closer to real-life, quality animation to accentuate the motorbiking scenes and use of the gag comedy format to tell its stories (highlighting the Hokkaido arc), calling it "[A]n energetic, if flawed, show that nevertheless has its heart where it counts."
