= Mariel (given name) =

Mariel is a feminine given name, a diminutive of Mary and influenced by Muriel. (Spanish pronunciation: [maˈɾjel])

== List of persons with the given name ==
- Mariel Jean-Brunhes Delamarre (1905–2001), French writer, geographer and ethnologist
- Mariel Hemingway (born 1961), American actress and writer, granddaughter of writer Ernest Hemingway
- Mariel Maciá (born 1980), Argentine-Spanish film director, theater director, screenwriter and producer
- Mariel Molino (born 1992), American actress
- Mariel Semonte Orr (1987–2022), American rapper better known by the stage name Trouble
- Mariel Pamintuan (born 1998), Filipino actress, singer and model
- Maria Erlinda "Mariel" Sazon Termulo-Padilla (born 1984), Filipino-born American commercial model, endorser, television host, VJ and actress better known as Mariel Rodriguez-Padilla
- Mariel Zagunis (born 1985), American Olympic sabre fencer

== Other uses ==
- "Mariel", a song by Fiona on her 1989 album Heart Like a Gun
- Mariel is also the name of the main character in Brian Jacques' book, Mariel of Redwall.

== See also ==
- Marielle (given name)
