= List of Black Clover characters =

Some characters of the series. Left row (front to back): Yami Sukehiro, Luck Voltia, Fuegoleon Vermillion, Gauche Adlai, and Nozel Silva. Right row (front to back): Asta, Yuno Grinberryall, Julius Novachrono, Mereoleona Vermillion, and Noelle Silva.

The Japanese manga series Black Clover features an extensive cast of fictional characters created by Yūki Tabata. The series focuses on Asta and Yuno's journey on becoming a wizard king in a world where everyone including Yuno has magic, whereas Asta has none.

== Main characters ==
=== Asta ===
Voiced by: Shun Horie (OVA), Gakuto Kajiwara (anime) (Japanese); Dallas Reid (English)
Portrayed by: Keisuke Ueda (stage play)

Asta (アスタ, Asuta) is an orphan raised in a church who aspires to become the Wizard King. Despite being born without the ability to use magic, he possesses immense physical strength and wields a five-leaf clover grimoire containing the Anti-Magic devil Liebe. This grants him the power to nullify magic through weapons like the Demon-Slayer Sword. He joins the Black Bulls, embracing their captain Yami's philosophy to surpass his limits. Asta confronts numerous threats including the Eye of the Midnight Sun, the reincarnated elves, and devils such as Zagred. After mastering Devil Union with Liebe, he battles the Dark Triad and Lucius, later training in the Land of the Sun to further refine his abilities before returning to defend the Clover Kingdom.

=== Yuno Grinberryall ===
Voiced by: Sōma Saitō (OVA), Nobunaga Shimazaki (anime) (Japanese); Micah Solusod (English)
Portrayed by: Naoki Takeshi (stage play)

Yuno Grinberryall (ユノ・グリンベリオール, Yuno Gurinberiōru) is Asta's rival, best friend, and a fellow orphan raised in Hage, sharing the goal of becoming the Wizard King. He is later revealed to be the prince of the Spade Kingdom's former royal family, House Grinberryall. Yuno wields Wind Magic and possesses a four-leaf clover grimoire, a result of being the human vessel for the reincarnated unborn son of the elf Licht. He is the chosen partner of the wind spirit Sylph. Yuno rises quickly through the ranks of the Golden Dawn, confronting threats such as the Eye of the Midnight Sun and the reincarnated elves. He later awakens his innate Star Magic, manifesting a second grimoire. After battling Zenon and Lucifero, he remains in the Clover Kingdom to honor his rivalry with Asta, ultimately joining the final confrontation against Lucius.

=== Noelle Silva ===
Voiced by: Kana Yūki (Japanese); Jill Harris (English)
Portrayed by: Arisa Komiya (stage play)

Noelle Silva (ノエル・シルヴァ, Noeru Shiruva) is a royal mage of House Silva and a member of the Black Bulls. Despite her immense mana and Water Magic potential, she initially struggles with control due to childhood trauma involving her mother Acier's death. With support from the Black Bulls, she overcomes this weakness while developing romantic feelings for Asta. Her combat skills grow significantly through battles against threats like the Eye of the Midnight Sun and the elf Kivin, where she masters water-based armor. Later revelations about her mother's death at Megicula's hands drive her to train with Undine, ultimately helping defeat the devil. After the Spade Kingdom war, she contracts with the Sea God and reconciles with her siblings so they could fight their resurrected mother together.

=== Liebe ===
Voiced by: Kenichirou Matsuda (giant form), Nobuhiko Okamoto (true form) (Japanese); Cris George (giant form) Bryce Papenbrook (true form) (English)

Liebe (リーベ, Rībe) is a devil residing in Licht's five-leaf grimoire who becomes the source of Asta's Anti-Magic. Born without magic, he endured torment in the underworld before escaping to the human world, where Asta's mother Licita adopted him. When Lucifero attempted to manifest through Liebe's body, Licita sacrificed herself to seal Liebe in the grimoire. This tragedy fuels his hatred for devils and initially drives him to seek control of Asta's body for vengeance. After forming a contract with Asta, their bond deepens when Asta recognizes him as his adopted brother. Together they defeat Lucifero, after which Liebe pledges to help Asta become Wizard King.

== Clover Kingdom ==
=== Wizard Kings ===
==== Lumiere Silvamillion Clover ====
Voiced by: Syu Hikari (Japanese); Chris Burnett (English)

Lumiere Silvamillion Clover (ルミエル・シルヴァミリオン・クローバ, Rumieru Shiruvamirion Kurōbā) is the first Wizard King who pioneered magic tool development. He forms a historic friendship with Licht, sharing dreams of human-elf coexistence. When Zagred orchestrates the elf massacre through possessed royals, Lumiere reluctantly fights the transformed Licht at his request. After being named Wizard King, he has Secre petrify him as a safeguard against Zagred's return. Centuries later, he revives to battle Zagred alongside Asta's generation in the Shadow Palace. With the elves finally at peace, Lumiere passes on content that his ideals endure through modern magic knights.

==== Julius Novachrono ====
Voiced by: Toshiyuki Morikawa (Japanese); Robert McCollum (English)

Julius Novachrono (ユリウス・ノヴァクロノ, Yuriusu Novakurono) serves as the 28th Wizard King, wielding rare Time Magic. Former captain of the Grey Deer squad, he recruited both Yami and William Vangeance. Known for neglecting duties to study unique magic, he takes interest in Asta's anti-magic abilities. After being killed by Patry during the elf conflict, Julius resurrects using stored time energy, reverting to a 13-year-old form with diminished power. He continues advising the Magic Knights while concealing his condition. His identity is later revealed as a secondary soul sharing a body with Lucius, who eventually suppresses Julius's consciousness. Following Lucius's defeat, Julius uses the last of his magic and sacrifices his life to undo the damage done in the final battle. Before dying peacefully he entrusts the future of the Clover Kingdom to the magic knights.

==== Conrad Leto ====
Voiced by: Toshihiko Seki (Japanese); Chris Niosi (English)

Conrad Leto (コンラート・レト, Konrāto Reto) is the 27th Wizard King and user of Key Magic, which allows him to create dimensional rifts, who is the antagonist of Black Clover: Sword of the Wizard King. Conrad was previously the Magic Knight Captain of the White Serpent Squad and was respected and loved by the Clover Kingdom's citizens, sharing Asta's outlook and determination. But after being framed for a crime by corrupt royalists, which resulted in the deaths of his comrades, and his wife Lovilia, Conrad was consumed in grief and rage as he turns on his people with the intent of sealing their souls within the Sword of the First Wizard King to revive those he deems worthy to live. But before he could carry out his plans, he was sealed away by Julius, only to break free years later in the aftermath of the Elves' attack on the Clover Kingdom to finish what he began with some of his revived predecessors.

==== Princia Funnybunny ====
Voiced by: Miyuki Sawashiro (Japanese); Mara Junot (English)

Princia Funnybunny (プリンシア・ファニーバニー, Purinshia Fanībanī) is the 11th Wizard King and user of Legion Magic, which grants her the power to create artificial soldiers that resemble chess pieces. After her family lost everything to corrupt nobles, Princia joined the Magic Knights to protect them and others suffering from oppression. After joining the Blue Rose knight squad, she gained a reputation as an undefeated warrior, allowing her to eventually achieve the title of Wizard King. After the war with the Diamond Kingdom, Princia learned that her family was taken hostage by the enemy during the war, and the incident had been covered up by her generals to ensure that she never left the frontlines. The revelation enraged her, but before she could get revenge, she was stripped of her title and her magic was sealed away. She was later killed by bandits when they raided the town she was imprisoned in. She is resurrected several centuries later by Conrad Leto, and joins him in his plan to destroy the Clover Kingdom.

==== Jester Garandros ====
Voiced by: Fumiya Takahashi (Japanese); Ben Diskin (English)

Jester Garandros (ジェスター・ガランドロス, Jesutā Garandorosu) is the 16th Wizard King and user of Barrier Magic, which gives him the power to create and manipulate magical barriers. Born into nobility, Jester joined the Magic Knights, and became friends with a pair of knights named Tenor and Raid. After an attack on Tenor's village that resulted in Tenor's death, Jester decided to rise up the ranks and become the Wizard King to prevent another incident. Later on, he is betrayed by Raid, who reveals himself as an enemy spy, and Jester is forced to kill him. Blaming this betrayal on the constant conflicts between the four kingdoms, Jester became determined to conquer the Diamond, Heart, and Spade Kingdoms, and unite them all under one banner. Despite gaining a large amount of support, Jester was eventually killed in a trap set up by nobles who opposed him. Centuries later, he is resurrected by Conrad Leto to assist in his plan to destroy the Kingdom.

==== Edward Avalaché ====
Voiced by: Hōchū Ōtsuka (Japanese); Steve Blum (English)

Edward Avalaché (エドワード・アバーラシェ, Edowādo Abārashe) is the 20th Wizard King and user of Ice Wedge Magic, which allows him to control and manipulate ice, as well as create ice constructs. Before becoming the Wizard King, Edward was a church priest that took in orphaned children. One day, raiders from the Diamond Kingdom attacked and destroyed an orphanage he owned, killing its inhabitants. In response, Edward joined the Magic Knights to become stronger and protect others. Eventually, he climbed the ranks and became the Wizard King, gaining immense popularity and respect along the way. However, he was ousted by corrupt nobles who opposed his goal to end the divide between the classes of the Clover Kingdom. In response, Edward formed a resistance unit to eliminate the Kingdom's nobility to end the corruption, but he was eventually captured and executed. He is later revived by Conrad Leto using the Imperial Sword Elsdocia to assist in destroying the Clover Kingdom.

=== Wizard King Advisors ===
==== Marx Francois ====
Voiced by: Yoshitaka Yamaya (Japanese); Aaron Dismuke (English)

Marx Francois (マルクス・フランソワ, Marukusu Furansowa) serves as Julius Novachrono's advisor, utilizing Memory Magic to extract information. He frequently reminds Julius of his royal duties. During the elf conflict, Marx suffers possession until Yami exorcises him. When Lucius attacks, Marx assists civilian evacuations before being captured. Lucius sacrifices Marx to demonstrate grimoire reincarnation, acquiring his memory abilities. Using Marx's magic, Lucius projects his battle against Asta and Yuno across the Kingdom, displaying the former advisor's powers for strategic purposes. After Asta and Yuno defeated Lucius, Julius took back control of his body long enough to use his time magic to revive everyone including Marx and restore the Clover Kingdom to before the battle against Lucius Zogratis began.

==== Owen ====
Voiced by: Eiichiro Tokumoto (Japanese); Kent Williams (English)

Owen (オーヴェン, Ōven) is a Magic Knight and Julius's right hand who is the best healer in the Clover Kingdom, possessing Water Healing magic that allows him to reattach severed arms or emulate X-rays. After the fight in the Underwater Sea Temple, he tells Asta that he will not be able to use his arms, infected by the Ancient Curse magic, as his bones are turning to dust. After Patry completes the reincarnation ritual, Owen ends up being possessed by an Elf spirit with his magic inverted to destroy rather than heal. He and Marx briefly battle Yami but they are defeated and later exorcised. After Zagred is defeated, he resumes his duties.

=== House of Kira ===
One of the three royal houses alongside Houses Vermilion and Silva, House Kira (キーラ家, Kīra-ke)'s lineage dates back to the foundation of the Clover Kingdom and genocide of the Elves.

==== Augustus Kira Clover XIII ====
Voiced by: Jun Miyamoto (Japanese); Sonny Strait (English)

Augustus Kira Clover XIII (アウグストゥス・キーラ・クローバー13世, Augusutusu Kīra Kurōbā Jūsan-sei) is the current King of Clover, wielding Light Magic yet lacking combat prowess due to his arrogance. Obsessed with noble status, he dismisses commoners and craves recognition surpassing the Wizard King's. His flashy but ineffective magic reflects his misplaced confidence in royal privilege alone. During crises, he requires rescue—first from Langris' attack, then relying on Sekke's fabricated heroism. His pettiness manifests in appointing the incompetent Sekke as attendant and sending him on critical missions. Augustus embodies the worst aristocratic tendencies the Magic Knights must overcome.

==== Damnatio Kira ====
Voiced by: Hiroshi Tsuchida (Japanese); Alex Organ (English)

Damnatio Kira (ダムナティオ・キーラ, Damunatio Kīra) is the chairman of the Clover Kingdom's Magic Parliament and a member of House Kira. His Scale Magic allows him to shrink and counter most magical attacks, though it is ineffective against Anti-Magic. He oversees Asta's trial following the elf conflict before being circumvented by Julius Novachrono's intervention. Damnatio later discovers the connection between Julius and Lucius but is incapacitated before exposing the truth. Lucius subsequently transforms him into a Paladin by incarnating the purified devil Baal into him, granting him Air Magic. In this enhanced state, he battles the Black Bulls before being defeated by Asta.

==== Finnes Calmreich ====
Voiced by: Eri Akiyama (Japanese); AmaLee (English)

Finnes Calmreich (フィーネス・カルムルイヒ, Fīnesu Karumuruihi) is a noblewoman of the Clover Kingdom's House Kira, one of its royal families, betrothed to the next head of House Vaude, Langris Vaude. As a young lady she met Finral, and believed him to be a better fit for head of the House. After proving his worth as the heir of House Vaude, Finral and Finnes marry.

=== Black Bull Squad ===
==== Yami Sukehiro ====
Voiced by: Junichi Suwabe (Japanese); Christopher Sabat (English)
Portrayed by: Haruto Sakuraba (stage play)

Yami Sukehiro (ヤミ・スケヒロ), originally Sukehiro Yami (夜見 介大, Yami Sukehiro) and nicknamed the Lord of Destruction (破壊神, Hakaishin), is the captain of the Black Bulls. Hailing from the Land of the Sun (日ノ国, Hino Kuni), he wields Dark Magic capable of negating other spells and sensing ki. After confronting Lucius Zogratis and the resurrected Morgen Faust, Yami is cornered alongside his sister Ichika and Nacht. The Supreme Devil Adrammelech approaches and offers a pact, which Yami accepts. By becoming Adrammelech's host, Yami gains Light Magic and uses this new power to defeat Morgen.

==== Finral Roulacase ====
Voiced by: Jun Fukuyama (Japanese); Brandon McInnis (English)

Finral Roulacase (フィンラル・ルーラケイス, Finraru Rūrakeisu) is a Black Bulls member specializing in Spatial Magic for transportation. Initially cowardly and irresponsible due to family pressures, he grows into a courageous mage. Rejecting his noble House Vaude heritage, he adopts his mother's surname after being overshadowed by his brother Langris. His supportive role proves vital in battles against Vetto, Patry, and Dante. After reconciling with Langris during the elf conflict, he embraces his role as House Vaude heir while controlling his womanizing tendencies for his betrothed, Finnes. His spatial abilities become crucial in later conflicts, including transporting allies during the Spade Kingdom invasion and retrieving Asta from the Land of the Sun. In the aftermath, Finral and Finnes eventually marry.

==== Magna Swing ====
Voiced by: Genki Muro (Japanese); Ian Sinclair (English)
Portrayed by: Kosuke Maiguma (stage play)

Magna Swing (マグナ・スウィング, Maguna Suwingu) is a fiery-tempered Black Bulls member who serves as Yami's right-hand man. Originally a delinquent from Rayaka Village, he reforms under a village elder's guidance and joins the Magic Knights. Despite limited mana, he creatively wields Fire Magic through varied fireball attacks while riding his signature broom, "Crazy Cyclone". Magna mentors younger members like Asta and Noelle, with his best friend bond with Luck proving crucial in breaking Luck's elf possession. After feeling outpaced by peers, he develops a rune technique to equalize magic power with the help of Zora, enabling him to defeat Dante Zogratis. Later, he participates in retrieving Asta and battles Lucius.

==== Luck Voltia ====
Voiced by: Ayumu Murase (Japanese); Justin Briner (English)
Portrayed by: Jumpei Mitsui (stage play)

Luck Voltia (ラック・ボルティア, Rakku Borutia) is a battle-obsessed Black Bulls member nicknamed "Luck the Cheery Berserker" for his constant smile in combat. His Lightning Magic grants him exceptional speed through lightning-formed gloves and boots. Orphaned in Yvon Village, he equates victory with affection, driving his relentless pursuit of strong opponents. His friendly rivalry with Magna evolves into a crucial best friend bond, particularly when Magna helps free him from elf possession. After training in the Heart Kingdom, he masters Ultimate Lightning Magic and aids in the Spade Kingdom invasion. Later, he joins the Black Bulls' mission to retrieve Asta and participates in the final battle against Lucius.

==== Gauche Adlai ====
Voiced by: Satoshi Hino (Japanese); Dave Trosko (English)

Gauche Adlai (ゴーシュ・アドレイ, Gōshu Adorei) is a Black Bulls member who wields Mirror Magic through his artificial left eye. Once a noble turned criminal to support his sister Marie, his obsessive protection of her leads to his recruitment by Yami. Initially antisocial, Gauche gradually accepts his teammates after witnessing their loyalty during missions like rescuing Marie from kidnappers. His elf possession by Drowa proves transformative, helping him overcome his distrust of others. He later aids critical battles against Dante and in the Spade Kingdom invasion. Following the war, he joins the Black Bulls' search for Asta and participates in the final conflict against Lucius.

==== Charmy Pappitson ====
Voiced by: Kiyono Yasuno (Japanese); Sarah Wiedenheft (English)

Charmy Pappitson (チャーミー・パピットソン, Chāmī Papittoson) is a member of the Black Bulls whose childlike appearance contrasts with her immense power. She utilizes Cotton Magic to create sheep for both culinary and combat purposes, producing food that restores magical power. Her unique Food Magic can manifest a giant wolf that consumes enemy spells, transferring their energy to her. Of half-dwarf descent, she possesses an adult transformation that greatly enhances her abilities. After training in the Heart Kingdom, she masters Ultimate Cotton Magic and participates in critical battles, including the Spade Kingdom campaign and the final confrontation against Lucius.

==== Vanessa Enoteca ====
Voiced by: Nana Mizuki (Japanese); Lydia Mackay (English)

Vanessa Enoteca (バネッサ・エノテーカ, Banessa Enotēka) is a witch of the Black Bulls who wields Thread Magic to manipulate unseen threads. Escaping her mother's oppressive rule in the Forest of Witches, she joins Yami's squad to forge her own destiny. Her latent ability manifests as the Red Thread of Fate—a magical cat named Rouge that alters unfavorable outcomes. This power proves crucial in battles against Vetto and Dante. After helping defeat the Diamond Kingdom and Spade Kingdom threats, she participates in retrieving Asta from the Land of the Sun. Though offered her mother's throne, she declines to remain with the Black Bulls for their final battle against Lucius.

==== Grey ====
Voiced by: Minami Takahashi, Masayuki Akasaka (Transformed) (Japanese); Megan Shipman, Jarrod Greene (Transformed) (English)

Grey (グレイ, Gurei) is a timid Black Bulls member who initially disguises herself as a shadowy man using what appears to be Transformation Magic. Escaping an abusive family, she develops affection for Gauche while gradually overcoming her shyness. Her true power is revealed as Transmutation Magic, allowing her to alter matter and magic attributes. This ability proves vital in battles against the Eye of the Midnight Sun and Dante Zogratis. After helping research devils with Asta, she participates in the Spade Kingdom invasion. Later, she joins the Black Bulls' mission to retrieve Asta and contributes to the final battle against Lucius, empowered by Asta's anti-magic.

==== Gordon Agrippa ====
Voiced by: Kenichirou Matsuda (Japanese); Mike McFarland(season 1, Sword of the Wizard King) (English)

Gordon Agrippa (ゴードン・アグリッパ, Gōdon Agurippa) is a Black Bulls member specializing in Poison Magic and curses. Despite his unsettling appearance and soft speech from childhood isolation, he deeply values companionship. Coming from a lineage of curse users, Gordon initially distanced himself from his family until discovering his father had repurposed their knowledge for healing. Through battles against the Eye of the Midnight Sun and elf reincarnations, he gains confidence with his squad's acceptance. During the timeskip, he learns to transform curses into medicine. He later participates in critical missions including the Spade Kingdom invasion and the final battle against Lucius.

==== Zora Ideale ====
Voiced by: Hikaru Midorikawa (Japanese); Johnny Yong Bosch (English)

Zora Ideale (ゾラ・イデアーレ, Zora Ideāre) is a Black Bulls member who wields Ash Magic to create trap spells, often reflecting attacks with doubled power. His cynical worldview stems from his father Zara's murder by fellow Magic Knights, fueling his disdain for corrupt nobility. Initially refusing to wear his squad robe, Zora gradually accepts teamwork after witnessing Asta's integrity. During the elf conflict, he aids Mereoleona and defends the Silva residence. In the timeskip, he assists Magna with rune research. Zora later participates in the Spade Kingdom invasion and final battle against Lucius, maintaining his sharp tongue but proving his loyalty to the Black Bulls.

==== Henry Legolant ====
Voiced by: Mitsuki Saiga (Japanese); Stephen Fu (English)

Henry Legolant (ヘンリー・レゴラント, Henrī Regoranto) is the Black Bulls' base caretaker, using Recombination Magic to reshape the structure. Born with a curse that drains others' mana to survive, he was abandoned by his noble family until Yami recruited him. Initially hiding as a "ghost", he reveals himself during the Eye of the Midnight Sun's attack, transforming the base into a combat form using stored mana. His loyalty drives him to aid critical battles against Drowa and Dante. After the Spade Kingdom conflict, he joins the search for Asta and fights against Lucius' forces, finally living openly with the squad he cherishes.

==== Secre Swallowtail ====
Voiced by: Hitomi Sasaki (Nero), Ayane Sakura (Japanese); Monica Rial (English)

Secre Swallowtail (セクレ・スワロティル, Sekure Suwarotiru), known as Nero, is a former servant of Wizard King Lumiere from 500 years past. Her Sealing Magic, used to imprison the devil Zagred, cursed her with horns and the ability to transform into an anti-bird. In this form, she accompanies Asta after their first meeting, later joining the Black Bulls officially. Crucial in reviving Lumiere and defeating Zagred, she becomes a key Black Bulls member, aiding their investigations into devils. After training in the Heart Kingdom, she participates in battles against Vanica and later Lucius. Her sealing abilities and knowledge prove vital throughout these conflicts.

==== Nacht Faust ====
Voiced by: Hiro Shimono (Japanese); Max Mittelman (English)

Nacht Faust (ナハト・ファウスト, Nahato Fausuto) is the vice-captain of the Black Bulls, wielding Shadow Magic and Devil Union abilities via contracts with four devils. His twin brother Morgen's death during a failed ritual to bind a supreme devil leaves him burdened with guilt. He secretly joins the Black Bulls under Yami, later emerging to train Asta for the Spade Kingdom invasion. After contributing to Lucifero's defeat, he fully commits to his role and resumes his friendship with Yami. When Lucius revives Morgen as a Paladin, Nacht initially struggles but, with support from Yami and Ichika, overcomes his guilt. Their combined efforts defeat the Paladin, though Lucius later reanimates Morgen in a monstrous form.

=== Golden Dawn Squad ===
The Golden Dawn (金色の夜明け, Konjiki no Yoake) are the strongest order of Magic Knights, at least according to Wizard King Julius' "Star" System of rankings. The selection of most of its members is later revealed to have been part of Patry's plan as the majority of them are reincarnated elves.

==== William Vangeance ====
Voiced by: Daisuke Ono (Japanese); Jessie James Grelle (Note: Credited as Josh Grelle; Grelle came out as transgender and changed their name in 2023.) (English)

William Vangeance (ウィリアム・ヴァンジャンス, Wiriamu Vanjansu) is the captain of the Golden Dawn, wielding World Tree Magic. Born with a facial scar, his childhood leads to a symbiotic relationship with the elf Patry, who shares his body. After Patry's control during the elf reincarnation is ended by Asta, William resumes command. His magic is vital in healing his squad after an attack by Zenon. When Lucius assaults the Kingdom, William is defeated and subsequently names Yuno as his successor. Later, Gordon Agrippa's Curse-Worker Magic temporarily alters William's appearance, removing his scar and enhancing his physical and magical abilities.

==== Langris Vaude ====
Voiced by: Kaito Ishikawa (Japanese); Clifford Chapin (English)

Langris Vaude (ランギルス・ヴォード, Rangirusu Vōdo) is Finral's younger brother and the former vice-captain of the Golden Dawn, wielding offensive Spatial Magic. His deep-seated envy and insecurity manifest as arrogance. After a violent confrontation with Finral, an elf possesses him. Once freed, he reconciles with his brother while maintaining a competitive rivalry. He later fights alongside Yuno against Zenon, cooperating with Finral to create an opening for a decisive attack. During the final battle against Lucius, he helps protect Mimosa from an angelic assailant and, alongside Kirsch, acknowledges Asta's strength.

==== Klaus Lunettes ====
Voiced by: Takuma Terashima (Japanese); Aaron Roberts (English)
Portrayed by: Shuji Kikuchi (stage play)

Klaus Lunettes (クラウス・リュネット, Kurausu Ryunettos) is a nobleman and a member of the Golden Dawn, a serious-minded user of Steel Magic. While Klaus initially looked down on Asta and Yuno for being from "the sticks", he ends being on friendly terms with them following their mission in a dungeon and seeing them fight Mars. During the Eye of the Midnight Sun's invasion of the royal capital, he helps his squadmates fight the zombies before being swept up by spatial magic. He later takes the Royal Knights selection exam and is accepted into the Royal Knights. However, during the raid on the Eye of the Midnight Sun's hideout, Klaus ends up later possessed by an elf spirit following Patry's ritual which is later exorcised. He is almost killed when Zenon invades the Golden Dawn's headquarters. He later participates in the battle against Lucius.

==== Mimosa Vermillion ====
Voiced by: Asuka Nishi (Japanese); Bryn Apprill (English)
Portrayed by: Yuka Kato (stage play)

Mimosa Vermillion (ミモザ・ヴァーミリオン, Mimoza Vāmirion) is a member of the Golden Dawn and a royal of House Vermillion who wields healing-focused Plant Magic. She judges individuals by merit rather than birth, admiring her cousin Noelle's determination. After developing feelings for Asta, she becomes a Royal Knight and trains in the Heart Kingdom to master Ultimate Plant Magic. Her abilities prove crucial during the conflicts with the elves and in the Spade Kingdom war. During Lucius's attack, she aids civilian evacuations. Yuno later brings a wounded Asta to her for healing. Though initially concerned about her depleted magic reserves, she is aided by the arrival of Charmy Pappitson, whose magic-restoring food allows Mimosa to fully heal Asta with her Ultimate Magic, enabling his return to battle.

==== Alecdora Sandler ====
Voiced by: Genki Okawa (Japanese); Matt Shipman (English)

Alecdora Sandler (アレクドラ・サンドラー, Arekudora Sandorā) is a nobleman and member of the Golden Dawn who uses Sand Magic. He is mostly stoic in nature, having completely devoted himself to William since being saved during a mission and believing that only he can fulfill his captain's dream of becoming Wizard King. This placed him at odds with Yuno whom he considered unworthy of William's favor, and utterly loathes him for wanting to become the next Wizard King. During the Eye of the Midnight Sun's invasion of the royal capital, he helps his squadmates fight off the zombies before being swept up by spatial magic. He later takes the Royal Knights Selection Exam and faces Yuno on opposing teams, with Sandler losing in a one-on-one battle with Yuno. He is not accepted into the Royal Knights. He is later possessed by an elf spirit that was later exorcised. He is almost killed when Zenon invades the Golden Dawn's headquarters.

==== Hamon Caseus ====
Voiced by: Kohsuke Toriumi (Japanese); Kyle Phillips (English)

Hamon Caseus (ハモン・カーセウス, Hamon Kāseusu) was a nobleman and a 2nd Class Intermediate Magic Knight of the Clover Kingdom's Golden Dawn and Royal Knights squads. He was a cheerful man who enjoys eating and sharing food with others. He used Glass Magic to generate and manipulate glass. During the Eye of the Midnight Sun's invasion of the royal capital, he helps his teammates with battling zombies before getting swept up by spatial magic. He later takes the Royal Knights selection exam and is accepted into the Royal Knights. He is later possessed by an elf spirit which is later exorcised. He was killed by Zenon's forces when he invaded the Golden Dawn Headquarters.

==== Letoile Becquerel ====
Voiced by: Yū Ayase (Japanese); Kate Bristol (English)

Letoile Becquerel (レトゥア・ベクレル, Retua Bekureru) is a noblewoman and member of the Golden Dawn who uses Compass Magic, with which she can manipulate the trajectories of anything designated as its target. She is later possessed by an elf spirit which is later exorcised.

==== David Swallow ====
Voiced by: Makoto Sahara (Japanese); Matt Holmes (English)

David Swallow (ダヴィド・スワロー, David Suwarō) is a nobleman and member of the Golden Dawn who uses Dice Magic. He uses this magic attribute to manifest dice that generate power in proportion to the number of pips rolled. He is later possessed by an elf spirit which is later exorcised.

==== Siren Tium ====
Voiced by: Masayuki Akasaka (Japanese); Randy E. Aguebor, Chris Rager (from episode 141) (English)

Siren Tium (ダヴィド・スワロー, Shiren Tiumu) was a nobleman and member of the Golden Dawn who uses Stone Magic to manipulate stone and all its properties. He is later possessed by an elf spirit which is later exorcised. He was killed by Zenon's forces when he invaded the Golden Dawn Headquarters.

=== Crimson Lion Kings Squad ===
The Crimson Lion Kings (紅蓮の獅子王, Guren no Shinshio) are a Magic Knight Squad with close ties to House Vermillion (ヴァーミリオン家, Vāmirion-ke), whose lineage dates back to the foundation of the Clover Kingdom and genocide of the Elves. One branch of the family's siblings is known for their red hair, desire for strength, and skill in Fire Magic. The other branch is known for their orange hair, conflicting personalities, and skill in nature-based magic.

==== Fuegoleon Vermillion ====
Voiced by: Katsuyuki Konishi (Japanese); J. Michael Tatum (English)

Fuegoleon Vermillion (フエゴレオン・ヴァーミリオン, Fuegoreon Vāmirion) is the noble captain of the Crimson Lion Kings, wielding formidable Fire Magic. Unlike most royals, he demonstrates humility and mentors others regardless of status. Targeted by the Eye of the Midnight Sun, he suffers severe injuries from Patry and loses his right arm. After awakening from a coma, he returns with a flame prosthetic and bonds with the Fire Spirit Salamander, significantly enhancing his power. He plays crucial roles in battles against the elves, Lucifero, and Lucius, consistently proving his strength and leadership as one of the Clover Kingdom's most capable Magic Knights.

==== Leopold Vermillion ====
Voiced by: Kenn (Japanese); Austin Tindle (English)

Leopold Vermillion (レオポルド・ヴァーミリオン, Reoporudo Vāmirion) is the youngest sibling of the Vermillion family and a member of the Crimson Lion Kings, wielding Fire Magic. Though initially overshadowed by his older siblings, he strives to develop his own strength. He forms a friendly rivalry with Asta and trains in the Heart Kingdom to master Ultimate Flame Magic. Leopold demonstrates significant growth during major conflicts, including the Spade Kingdom campaign. In the final battle against Lucius, he helps protect his cousin Mimosa from an angel and is among those who loudly cheer for Asta to rejoin the fight. As Lucius launches a gargantuan magic spell upon the Clover Kingdom, Fuegoleon and Mereoleona try to stop the spell using their Spirit Dive and Excelicitus Leonum forms, respectively, but it is not enough, so they both shout for Leopold, to join them and help out, which make him elated to finally fight side by side with his siblings as an equal.

==== Mereoleona Vermillion ====
Voiced by: Junko Minagawa (Japanese); Monica Rial (English)

Mereoleona Vermillion (メレオレオナ・ヴァーミリオン, Mereoreona Vāmirion) is the formidable elder sister of Fuegoleon and Leopold, wielding mastery over Fire Magic and natural mana. Nicknamed the "Uncrowned, Undefeated Lioness", she judges individuals solely by their strength. As the Royal Knights commander, she mentors Asta. During critical battles, she overwhelms multiple elves, defeats Vetto, and confronts Morris during Lucius's invasion. When the Paladins are revived into more monstrous forms, she takes over the battle against Acier Silva so Noelle and her siblings can escape, maintaining her status as one of the Kingdom's most powerful and undefeated warriors.

==== Randall Luftair ====
Voiced by: Kentarō Itō (Japanese); Jason Douglas (English)

Randall Luftair (ランドール・ルフトエール, Randōru Rufutoēru) is the vice-captain of the Clover Kingdom's Crimson Lion King squad of the Magic Knights and a wielder of Air Magic. He is later possessed by an elf spirit which is later exorcised.

=== Silver Eagles Squad ===
The Silver Eagles (銀翼の大鷲, Gin'yoku no Ōwashi) are a Magic Knight Squad with close ties to House Silva (シルヴァ家, Shiruva-ke), whose lineage dates back to the foundation of the Clover Kingdom and genocide of the Elves. The family is known for their silver hair, often arrogant personalities, and skill in water-based magic and steel-based magic.

==== Nozel Silva ====
Voiced by: Kohsuke Toriumi (Japanese); Ricco Fajardo (English)

Nozel Silva (ノゼル・シルヴァ, Nozeru Shiruva) is the Silver Eagles captain and Silva family heir, wielding Mercury Magic to control liquid metal. Bound by a curse preventing him from revealing Megicula's role in his mother's death, he harshly discourages Noelle from becoming a Magic Knight to protect her. His cold demeanor masks deep familial concern, eventually reconciling with Noelle after witnessing her growth during the elf conflict. He plays pivotal roles in defeating Patry, Megicula, and Lucifero. Forced to battle his resurrected mother during Lucius's invasion, Nozel finally leads his siblings in overcoming their greatest challenge through united effort.

==== Nebra Silva ====
Voiced by: Yurika Aizawa (Japanese); Mallorie Rodak (English)

Nebra Silva (ネブラ・シルヴァ, Nebura Shiruva) is Noelle's arrogant elder sister who wields Mist Magic to create illusions and water projectiles. Like her brother Solid, she cruelly belittles Noelle while overestimating her own abilities. Her confidence shatters when she proves helpless against the elf Kivin, forcing Noelle and Nozel to intervene. During the Spade Kingdom crisis, she aids in homeland defense. Confronted by their resurrected mother during Lucius's invasion, Nebra joins Solid in apologizing to Noelle and assisting in their mother's defeat—her first genuine act of sisterly support after years of cruelty.

==== Solid Silva ====
Voiced by: Shouma Yamamoto (Japanese); Christopher Wehkamp (English)

Solid Silva (ソリド・シルヴァ, Sorido Shiruva) is Noelle's cruel elder brother who wields Water Magic. Known for his sadistic behavior, he relentlessly bullies Noelle, considering her a family disgrace. His arrogance leads to humiliation when Noelle defeats him during the Royal Knights selection. During the elf conflict, he witnesses Noelle's growth in battling Kivin. In the Spade Kingdom crisis, he helps defend the Clover Kingdom. Forced to confront their resurrected mother during Lucius's invasion, Solid and Nebra finally apologize to Noelle and assist in defeating their mother, marking his first act of genuine family loyalty and brotherly support after years of cruelty.

=== Green Praying Mantises Squad ===
==== Jack the Ripper ====
Voiced by: Daisuke Namikawa (Japanese); Justin Cook (English)

Jack the Ripper (ジャック・ザ・リッパー, Jakku Za Rippā) is the Green Mantis captain who wields Severing Magic, creating mana blades that adapt to opponents' magic. His combat prowess stems from slaying a giant bear in his youth. He frequently challenges Yami as a worthy rival. Jack participates in major conflicts including the Nean Village defense, elf reincarnation battles, and Spade Kingdom invasion. During the final battle, he assists Magna against Dante before falling to Morgen's attacks. Even in death, Jack delivers a final strike, demonstrating his relentless fighting spirit until the end. After Asta and Yuno defeat Lucius, Julius took control of his body long enough to revive everyone including Jack and to restore the Clover Kingdom to before the battle against Lucius Zogratis began.

==== Sekke Bronzazza ====
Voiced by: Ryōta Ōsaka (Japanese); Garret Storms (English)

Sekke Bronzazza (セッケ・ブロンザッザ, Sekke Buronzazza) is an arrogant magic knight who wields Bronze Magic. Initially attempting to exploit Asta during their entrance exam, his humiliating defeat fosters lasting resentment. His undeserved appointment as King Augustus's attendant stems from falsely claiming to rescue the monarch during an attack. Despite his cowardice and incompetence, Sekke participates in major conflicts including the Spade Kingdom invasion and battle against Lucius, where Asta's example reluctantly inspires him. His character serves as comic relief while satirizing undeserved privilege in the Clover Kingdom's hierarchy.

==== En Ringard ====
Voiced by: Satoshi Hino (Japanese); Jim Foronda (English)

En Ringard (エン・リンガード, En Ringādo) is a Magic Knight from the Green Praying Mantises Squad. He uses Fungus Magic, allowing him to generate mushrooms with various effects. He can also attach spores on people to act as communication. Being the oldest of 11 siblings, he is very protective of them and cannot stand Solid's treatment of his sister Noelle. Despite being a rather weak and shy individual, he has shown to act energetic and aggressive, usually by proxy via his talking mushrooms. He was later inducted into the Royal Knights after taking the exam.

=== Blue Rose Knights Squad ===
An all-female squad built on the principle that women are superior to men in power.

==== Charlotte Roselei ====
Voiced by: Yū Kobayashi (Japanese); Colleen Clinkenbeard (English)

Charlotte Roselei (シャルロット・ローズレイ, Sharurotto Rōzurei) is the captain of the Blue Rose Knights, wielding Briar Magic that controls thorns. A childhood curse that nearly killed her contributes to her cold demeanor, though it was broken by her unrequited love for Yami. She participates in major conflicts against threats like the elves, the devil Zagred, and the Dark Disciple Vanica. After the battle with Lucifero, she confesses her feelings to an unconscious Yami. Charlotte remains a key commander during Lucius's invasion. Gordon later uses his Curse-Worker Magic on her and William Vangeance, helping them manage their curses.

==== Sol Marron ====
Voiced by: Haruna Kakiage (Japanese); Morgan Garrett (English)

Sol Marron (ソル・マロン, Soru Maron) is a Blue Rose Knight who uses Earth Magic. Charlotte saves her as a child, creating lasting loyalty. During the capital invasion, she fights zombies alongside Charlotte before spatial magic transports them away. She attempts the Royal Knight selection but fails. When an elf possesses Charlotte, Sol reluctantly allows Yami to intervene. She remains in the Clover Kingdom during the Spade campaign, battling an ancient demon. Later, she participates in the conflict against Lucius alongside other Magic Knights.

=== Purple Orcas Squad ===
==== Gueldre Poizot ====
Voiced by: Tomokazu Sugita (Japanese); Gabe Kunda (English)

Gueldre Poizot (ゲルドル・ポイゾット, Gerudoru Poizotto) is the disgraced former captain of the Purple Orcas. His Transparency Magic grants invisibility and magic immunity, which he exploited for illegal trade and intimidation. After enabling the Eye of the Midnight Sun's attack for profit, he allies with Revchi during the elf assault but is captured by Yami. In the final arc, Lucius sacrifices Gueldre to demonstrate grimoire reincarnation, absorbing his Transparency Magic along with other deceased mages' powers. Gueldre's corrupt legacy serves as a dark contrast to the Magic Knights' ideals.

==== Kaiser Granvorka ====
Voiced by: Kenichirōu Matsuda (Japanese); Mark Stoddard (English)

Kaiser Granvorka (カイゼル・グランボルカ, Kaizeru Guranboruka) is the current Captain of the Purple Orcas following Gueldre's arrest, referred to as the Clover Kingdom's "ultimate shield", due to his mastery of Vortex Magic, which intercepts and disperses his opponent's magic. He would later be revealed to host to an Elf Apostle that Fuegoleon faces in the Shadow Palace which is later exorcised. During the Spade Kingdom battle, he stays behind to defend the Clover Kingdom from an ancient demon. He later participates in the battle against Lucius.

==== Revchi Salik ====
Voiced by: Yūto Suzuki (Japanese); Daman Mills (English)

Revchi Salik (レブチ・サリーク, Rebuchi Sarīku) is a disgraced former Purple Orcas member who wields Chain Magic capable of nullifying spells. After being framed by Gueldre and scarred, he becomes the first antagonist Asta and Yuno face, attempting to steal Yuno's grimoire before being arrested. During the elf attack, he allies with Gueldre against their common enemies. His later attempt to loot the Shadow Palace results in capture by Yami. In the final arc, Lucius sacrifices Revchi to demonstrate grimoire reincarnation, absorbing his Chain Magic to restrain Yuno until Asta intervenes with anti-magic.

==== Xerx Lugner ====
Voiced by: Wataru Tsuyuzaki (Japanese); Gregory Lush (English)

Xerx Lugner (ザクス・リューグナー, Zakusu Ryūgunā) is the vice-captain of the Purple Orcas and is an ice mage known as the Saint of Pure Ice. While assumed by many to be virtuous and protective of his squad's honor, he is actually a corrupt Magic Knight who is abusive towards commoners and those weaker than himself. While normally stationed at Clover Kingdom's border, he returns to the capital to take part in the Royal Knight selection exam before being brutally beaten by Zora Ideale for his treatment of a commoner woman. Xerx is later possessed by an elf spirit who attempts to destroy the town of Hecairo before Asta defeats and exorcises the elf.

=== Aqua Deer Squad ===
==== Rill Boismortier ====
Voiced by: Natsuki Hanae (Japanese); Derick Snow (English)

Rill Boismortier (リル・ボワモルティエ, Riru Bowamorutie) is the 19-year-old captain of the Aqua Deer, wielding Picture Magic to bring paintings to life. Initially struggling with artistic inspiration, he learned empathy from his butler Walter, shaping his cheerful personality. As the youngest Magic Captain, he bonds with peers like Asta. During the elf conflict, he is possessed by Lira, awakening Charmy's dwarf heritage. This experience inspires his art and sparks admiration for Charmy's adult form. After training in the Heart Kingdom, he battles Vanica and Lucifero, combining creative magic with tactical prowess. His artistic passion continues driving his growth as both mage and leader.

==== Fragil Tormenta ====
Voiced by: Aya Uchida (Japanese); Leah Clark (English)

Fragil Tormenta (フラギル・トルメンタ, Furagiru Torumenta) is a member of the Aqua Deer who uses Snow Magic, as well as some Healing Magic. She is later possessed by an elf spirit which is later exorcised.

=== Coral Peacocks Squad ===
==== Dorothy Unsworth ====
Voiced by: Mariya Ise (Japanese); Jad Saxton (English)

Dorothy Unsworth (ドロシー・アンズワース, Doroshī Anzuwāsu) is the Coral Peacocks captain and a witch from the Forest of Witches. Her Dream Magic creates manipulable dream dimensions where she appears cheerful and playful despite normally sleeping. During the elf conflict, she is possessed by the Apostle Reve until the Black Bulls help her regain control. After revealing the truth about Noelle's mother's death, she participates in the Spade Kingdom invasion against Morris and later battles Lucifero. She assists in summoning Asta back to the Clover Kingdom and ultimately succeeds the Witch Queen as ruler of the forest.

==== Kirsch Vermillion ====
Voiced by: Daisuke Namikawa (Japanese); Kyle Igneczi (English)

Kirsch Vermillion (キルシュ・ヴァーミリオン, Kirushu Vāmirion) is Mimosa Vermillion's older brother and the vice-captain of the Coral Peacocks. A nobleman who wields Cherry Blossom magic, he manages the squad's daily affairs. Though highly capable, his initial arrogance and fixation on beauty make him dismissive of others. This outlook changes following his defeat by Asta. He subsequently participates in defending the Kingdom from the reincarnated elves and an ancient demon. During the final battle against Lucius, he protects Mimosa from an angelic attacker alongside Langris and Leopold, and he and Langris eventually acknowledge Asta's strength.

=== The Underwater Temple ===
The Underwater Temple is an area under the ocean, in a strong magic region, where the mana force fields are so strong, that the currents prevents even upper-class mages from entering. As such, not many people visit the area, and the people there are very excited to see people from above water. The inhabitants have an alternate appearance as sea creatures. The temple is said to hold one of the magic stones, which are being collected by the Eye of the Midnight Sun, and the Wizard King sends the Black Bulls to retrieve it. It also houses the revered "Sea God" Leviathan.

==== Gifso ====
Voiced by: Chō (Japanese); Barry Yandell (English)

The temple's High Priest, Gifso (ジフソ, Jifuso) is an old man who is fond of games. When the Black Bulls arrive, he forces the team (except Yami, due to his strength) to play a game with the deal that he will give them the stone if they win it. He even uses this game as a condition to let his grandchildren, Kahono and Kiato, visit the surface. He is the wielder of Game Magic, which allows him to create a dimension for playing grand games with rules set in. However, when the game is in motion, even he cannot enter the dimension or interrupt the game. He gives the magic stone to the Black Bulls after they defeat Vetto.

==== Gio ====
Voiced by: Masayuki Akasaka (Japanese); Jarrod Greene (English)

Son of the High Priest, Gio (ジオ, Jio) is the strongest magic user in the Underwater Temple. He uses Water Magic. While initially he was facing both Luck and Magna, their battle is interrupted by Vetto, and is immediately defeated.

==== Kiato ====
Voiced by: Yoshimasa Hosoya (Japanese); David Matranga (English)

Grandson of the High Priest and Kahono's older brother. Kiato (キアト) is a user of Dance Magic, allowing him to use powerful sword attacks and make his movements hard to predict with his dances. He has a dream of going above ground to become an idol, forming a Singing/Dancing duo with Kahono. He duels Asta, but they are interrupted by the attack of Vetto. He has his leg amputated by Vetto during their fight, but it is later restored by the Witch Queen's Blood Magic when he and Kahono visit Asta and Noelle at the Star Festival. He has a crush on Noelle after seeing her Water Magic, and calls her "Sea Goddess". He and Kahono later help Noelle make a contract with the god of the Underwater Temple to help in the battle against Lucius.

==== Kahono ====
Voiced by: Megumi Han (Japanese); Brina Palencia (English)

Kahono (カホノ) is the lively granddaughter of the High Priest and Kiato's younger sister, possessing a sixth sense along with using her Song Magic for various uses which include offense, healing, and putting the afflicted to sleep. She also has dreams of becoming an idol with her brother, confiding it to Asta and Noelle while helping the latter learn to use her magic effectively. Kahono later served as an opposition to the Black Bulls before helping them fend off Vetto which ended with her throat crushed by him, rendering her unable to use her magic's full potential. Her throat is later healed by the Witch Queen's Blood Magic when she and Kiato were invited to the Star Awards Festival. She and Kiato later help Noelle make a contract with the god of the Underwater Temple to help in the battle against Lucius.

==== Sea God Leviathan ====
Leviathan (リヴァイアサン, Rivaiasan) is a massive, serpentine Water Dragon revered as the Sea God (海神, Kaijin) by the inhabitants of the Underwater Temple. It awakens only during cataclysmic events, emerging with immense rage to seek a worthy partner. Guided by Kiato and Kahono, Noelle Silva forms a contract with the dragon, drawing on her prior experience with the water spirit Undine. Leviathan becomes her combat partner against Acier Silva, granting her the Valkyrie Armor: Dragon Form and enabling the development of powerful new dragon-based abilities.

== Forest of Witches ==
A neutral zone between the Diamond Kingdom and the Clover Kingdom, the Forest of Witches (魔女の森, Majo no Mori) is home to an all-female population who use special magic like curses and familiars. Witches are allowed to visit the other kingdoms, but must only live in the forest, or they become criminals. Vanessa Enoteca, Dominante Code, Dorothy Unsworth, and Catherine are from the forest, before they fled from the country as fugitives.

=== Witch Queen ===
Voiced by: Ryoko Gi (Japanese); Jamie Marchi (English)

The Witch Queen (魔女王, Majo-ō) is the ruler of the Forest of Witches and Vanessa's mother. Possessing blood magic that heals and controls others, she values power above all else. Her perfectionism led to estrangement from Vanessa after imprisoning her to develop fate-altering Thread Magic. Though initially betraying the Black Bulls to exploit Asta's Anti-Magic, she ultimately aids them by providing a magic stone and healing Kahono and Kiato. Later, she assists in summoning Asta back to the Clover Kingdom and heals the injured Black Bulls before passing her title to Dorothy.

== Heart Kingdom ==
The Heart Kingdom (ハート王国, Hāto Ōkoku) is a western neighbor of the Clover Kingdom, renowned for its advanced magical traditions. Its citizens utilize the land's natural mana through the Mana Method (マナメソッド魔言術式, Mana Mesoddo), employing runic arrays to cast "True Magic" that manifests actual elements. Ruled by a succession of water mage queens bonded to the water spirit Undine (ウンディーネ, Undīne), the current queen Lolopechka forms an alliance with the Clover Kingdom. The Kingdom uses a Magic Stage ranking system to classify mage proficiency. Lolopechka is protected by a group of powerful mages known as the Spirit Guardians, who help defend the nation from threats.

=== Lolopechka ===
Voiced by: Yū Serizawa (Japanese); Cherami Leigh (English)

Lolopechka (ロロペチカ, Roropechika) is the Queen of the Heart Kingdom, contracted to the Water Spirit Undine. Despite her airheaded demeanor, she is a formidable ruler with near-omniscient awareness. Cursed by Megicula with one year to live, she allies with the Clover Kingdom to prepare for war against Spade. She personally mentors Noelle and Secre to battle Vanica, though is ultimately captured and rescued. After being healed, she is stunned when Gadjah publicly confesses his love for her. Following the Spade conflict, she resumes her royal duties and prepares the Heart Kingdom's defenses against Lucius's impending invasion.

=== Undine ===
Voiced by: Kana Ueda (Japanese); Emily Neves (English)

Undine (ウンディーネ, Undīne) is the benevolent spirit of water who wields vast Water Magic. She has served the queens and princesses of the Heart Kingdom for generations. She currently serves Princess Lolopechka and temporarily transfers to Noelle Silva as well.

=== Gadjah ===
Voiced by: Ryōtarō Okiayu (Japanese); Jeff Plunk (English)

Gadjah (ガジャ, Gaja) is one of the Heart Kingdom's Spirit Guardians and a master of Lightning Magic. He is responsible for training Luck Voltia in true lightning techniques. After Patry's group rescues him from near-fatal wounds, he joins their training and participates in the Spade Kingdom invasion. During the climactic battle, he faces a possessed Lolopechka and sacrifices himself against Megicula with Ultimate Lightning Magic, though failing to completely destroy the devil. Rill's magic temporarily revives him to support Noelle's final attack. Following Mimosa's healing, he publicly confesses his love for Lolopechka. When Lucius's forces attack, Gadjah is prepared to defend the Heart Kingdom.

== Spade Kingdom ==
A kingdom located north of the Clover Kingdom, the Spade Kingdom (スペード王国, Supēdo Ōkoku) is a wintry country whose mages derive their magic from the demons. Originally ruled by House Grinberryall, the Spade Kingdom was taken over by the Zogratis siblings, who subjugated their nation through fear while conquering most of the Diamond Kingdom before invading the other kingdoms. This forces the Clover and Heart Kingdoms to enter an alliance to repel the invaders and restore Ciel Grinberryall to the throne.

=== House of Grinberryall ===
==== Loyce Grinberryall ====
Voiced by: Takashi Yoshida (Japanese); D.C. Douglas (English)

Loyce Grinberryall (ロイス・グリンベリオール, Roisu Gurinberiōru) is the former king of the Spade Kingdom and Yuno's father, murdered by the Dark Triad when they took over the Kingdom. He possessed Sun Magic.

==== Ciel Grinberryall ====
Voiced by: Akiha Matsui (Japanese); Suzie Yeung (English)

Ciel Grinberryall (シエル・グリンベリオール, Shieru Gurinberiōru) is the queen of the Spade Kingdom and Yuno's mother, who went into hiding after the Dark Triad took over the Spade Kingdom under the protection of loyal citizens who formed a Resistance. She resurfaces once the Dark Triad are defeated and is reunited with Yuno. She possesses Moon Magic.

==== Ralph Niaflem ====
Voiced by: Daisuke Takahashi (Japanese); Keith Silverstein (English)

Ralph Niaflem (ラルフ・ニアフレム, Rarufu Niafuremu) is a former servant of House Grinberryall and member of the Resistance against the Dark Triad.

==== Allen Fiarain ====
Allen Fiarain (アレン・フィアレイン, Aren Fiarein) is a member of Spade Kingdom's Mage Defense Force and Zenon Zogratis' childhood friend who wields fire magic. He shares many similarities with Asta, including his desire to become Commander in Chief of the Mage Defense Force. He and Zenon both promised each other to reach that goal. During a mission, Allen fought with a devil that had killed several of his teammates. Zenon took advantage of the distraction and used his magic to kill both Allen and the devil. His death drove Zenon into despair and from then on sought only power at any cost, even his humanity.

== Land of the Sun ==
A land beyond the sea, the Land of the Sun or the Hino Country is Yami Sukehiro's homeland and where Asta and Liebe end up after being defeated by Lucius. Unlike the mages of the Clover Kingdom and its neighbors, Hino's mages use scrolls to manifest spells. They are led by the Shogun Ryūdō Ryūya, and a group of powerful mages called the Ryuzen Seven.

=== Yami Ichika ===
Yami Ichika (夜見 一花, Ichika Yami) is Yami Sukehiro's younger sister and a member of the Ryuzen Seven (龍禅七人衆, Ryūzen Shichininshū). Initially harboring hatred for Yami due to a tragic misunderstanding about their family's death, she trains Asta in the Land of the Sun. During an invasion, traumatic memories reveal she accidentally killed their family while berserk from a Demon Soul Pill. This leads to an emotional reconciliation with Yami, where she discovers he protected her by taking the blame. In the final battle, they combine their Dark Magic against Morgen, with Ichika demonstrating powerful techniques like Black Warrior form and collaborating with Yami and Nacht to create compound spells like Walpurgis Night.

=== Ryūdō Ryūya ===
Ryūdō Ryūya (龍頭 龍彌) or Ryū (龍) for short, is the easy-going shogun of the Hino Country, the former rival of Yosuga Mushogatake, and a childhood friend of Yami Sukehiro. Ryūya sacrificed his immense magic power to obtain the Tengentsu (天眼通, Tengentsū) in his right eye, a special eye with the power to perceive anything and everything that is going on at the present moment. The eye can also read people's thoughts and memories, as well as gauge their strength.

=== Fumito Mikuriya ===
Fumito Mikuriya (御厨 文人, Mikuriya Fumito) is a close friend of Ryūya and the designated healer of the Land of the Sun, being a powerful Water Magic Healer.

=== Ryuzen Seven ===
==== Jozo Hanegatsuji ====
Jozo Hanegatsuji (刎ヶ辻 浄蔵, Hanegatsuji Jōzō) is a member of the Ryuzen Seven who wields Wind Magic and adopts an eccentric, ninja-like persona. He assists in training Asta to master the Zetten technique. When the Paladin Lily Aquaria attacks the Land of the Sun, Jozo helps evacuate citizens before engaging the invaders. During the battle against the unleashed Five-Headed Dragon, he is injured after failing to strike his assigned target. Following Asta's victory over the dragon, Jozo participates in the celebration and joins the final training session before Asta departs to confront Lucius.

==== Daizaemon O'oka ====
Daizaemon O'oka (大岡 大左衛門, Ōka Daizaemon) is a member of the Ryuzen Seven who wields Earth Magic and possesses an easy-going personality. He assists in training Asta to master the Zetten technique. When the Paladin Lily Aquaria attacks the Land of the Sun, Daizaemon helps evacuate citizens before engaging the invaders. He and the other Ryuzen Seven face significant difficulty during the ensuing battle. Following Asta's victory over the Five-Headed Dragon, Daizaemon participates in the celebration and joins the final training session before Asta confronts Lucius.

==== Komori Imari ====
Komori Imari (伊万 里小鞠, Imari Komari) is a member of the Ryuzen Seven who wields Lightning Magic, known for her bubbly personality and flashy fashion sense. She assists in training Asta to master the Zetten technique. When the Paladin Lily Aquaria attacks the Land of the Sun, Komori helps evacuate citizens before engaging the invaders. She and the other Ryuzen Seven face significant difficulty battling Lily, the other Paladins, and the Five-Headed Dragon. Following Asta's victory over these threats, Komori participates in the celebration and joins the final training session before Asta departs to confront Lucius.

==== Ginnojomorifuyu Kezokaku ====
Ginnojomorifuyu Kezokaku (華蔵閣 銀之丞守冬, Kezōkaku Ginnojōmorifuyu) is a member of the Ryuzen Seven who wields Snow Magic. She exhibits a dual personality: timid and easily embarrassed off the battlefield, but bloodthirsty and aggressive in combat. She assists in training Asta to master the Zetten technique. When the Paladin Lily Aquaria attacks the Land of the Sun, Ginnojomorifuyu helps evacuate citizens before engaging the invaders. She and the other Ryuzen Seven struggle significantly against Lily, the other Paladins, and the Five-Headed Dragon. Following Asta's victory, she participates in the celebration and joins the final training session before Asta confronts Lucius.

==== Yosuga Mushogatake ====
Yosuga Mushogatake (無生ヶ 嶽縁, Mushōgatake Yosuga) is a member of the Ryuzen Seven who wields Iron Magic and is a supremely confident swordsman. He was once a rival of Ryūya Ryūdo for the title of Shogun. When asked to sacrifice his magic to acquire the Tengentsu ability, Yosuga refused, while Ryūya accepted. Yosuga later yielded the Shogun position to Ryūya and joined the Ryuzen Seven to serve under him. He helps train Asta to master the Zetten technique, aiding him in overcoming a personal complex. During the Paladin Lily Aquaria's attack, Yosuga assists in evacuations and battles the Paladin Heath Grice. Following Asta's victory, he participates in the final training before the confrontation with Lucius.

==== Fujio Tenmanyashiki ====
Fujio Tenmanyashiki (天満屋敷 富士央, Tenmanyashiki Fujio) is a member of the Ryuzen Seven who wields Sound Magic and Reinforcement Magic. A calm and quiet individual, he serves as the group's designated healer and uses his Sound Magic to communicate information over long distances. He assists Yosuga in training Asta to master the Zetten technique. When the Paladin Lily Aquaria attacks the Land of the Sun, Fujio helps evacuate citizens. During the subsequent battle, he uses his magic to boost his comrades' abilities and relay Ryūya Ryūdo's strategic commands for combating the Five-Headed Dragon. Following Asta's victory, Fujio participates in the celebration and joins the final training session before Asta confronts Lucius.

== Antagonists ==
=== Eye of the Midnight Sun ===
The Eye of the Midnight Sun (白夜の魔眼, Byakuya no Magan) are a militant group of humans possessed by elf souls, secretly led by Patry—the only fully reincarnated member of the Apostles of the Sephirah (セフィラの使徒, Sefira no Shito). They seek to complete a resurrection ritual using magic stones to restore the Elf Race (エルフ族, Erufu-zoku) to their "True Forms" (真の姿, Shin no Sugata), unaware their massacre centuries prior resulted from demonic manipulation. The ritual risks transforming elves into corrupted Dark Elves (ダークエルフ, Dāku Erufu) through wicked hearts (邪心, jashin). After discovering the truth, surviving members reconcile with their human hosts before passing on.

==== Patry ====
Voiced by: Takahiro Sakurai, Shouko Yuzuki (original body) (Japanese); Jerry Jewell, Jad Saxton (original body) (English)

Patry (パトリ, Patori) leads the Eye of the Midnight Sun and the Apostles of the Sephira. Reincarnated within William Vangeance's body, he assumes Licht's identity while using Light Magic through a four-leaf clover grimoire. He orchestrates attacks to collect magic stones for reviving the elves. After learning of Zagred's manipulation behind the elf genocide, he transforms into a Dark Elf before being restored by Asta. Following Zagred's defeat, he helps pacify the remaining elves. He later rescues several Magic Knights in the Heart Kingdom, training them in Ultimate Magic, and travels to the Spade Kingdom to save William Vangeance. During the final battle, Patry and the Third Eye join the fight, declaring they will protect the humans of the Clover Kingdom.

==== Heath Grice ====
Voiced by: Ryotaro Okiayu (Japanese); Marcus Stimac (English)

Heath Grice (ヒース・グライス, Hīsu Guraisu) is a time-obsessed mage who uses ice magic. Heath and his disciples attacked a village in the Clover Kingdom's Forsaken region for the magic stone located there. Heath ends up being defeated by Asta, Noelle Silva and Magna Swing, with one of his disciples escaping to report the turn of events to Patry. Heath used a relic to invoke a spell to kill himself and his two disciples in order to prevent the revealing of their agenda along with the Eye of the Midnight Sun's existence during their interrogation. Lucius later uses his siblings' magic to resurrect Heath years after the man's death, altering his soul to serve him as a Paladin. He is later killed by the Ryuzen Seven when he was sent to invade the Land of the Sun along with Sister Lily and Yrul. During the Battle of Judgment Day, Lucius used the abilities he gained from connecting with the Grimoire Towers to control the Paladins he had resurrected. He possessed Heath's body and attacked Ryuya Ryudo and the Ryuzen Seven. Lucius attacked Ryudo to find out why he supported Asta so much. When Ryuya's answer was not what Lucius wanted to hear, Lucius tried to kill Ryuya. Before Lucius could kill Ryuya, Yosuga Mushogatake emerged from the palace rubble in his Iron God of War form, beheaded Heath Grice, and killed Lucius Zogratis, kicking him out of the Land of the Sun for good.

==== Valtos ====
Voiced by: Daiki Hamano (Japanese); Chris Gurerrero (English)

Valtos (ヴァルトス, Varutosu) is a rogue mage who uses Spatial Magic to travel distances. He aids the group in attacking the Royal Capital and played a role in Fuegoleon's mortal injuries. He helps battle Julius but gets captured and is saved by Patry. During the Nean Village arc, he brings Patry to the cave where he helps him battle Asta and Yami but is defeated by Asta. He is then rescued by the Third Eye. Valtos later joins the assault on the Black Bulls' base to acquire the magic stone before retrieving Patry, only to be sacrificed, to his shock, for his mana. Valtos, disillusioned from being betrayed, is resurrected by Rades, and they, along with Sally, join forces with the Black Bulls to stop Patry. He later regains his respect for the elf when he redeemed himself. He later goes to assist the Clover Kingdom in the Spade Kingdom battle and later in the battle against Lucius.

==== Rades Spirito ====
Voiced by: Masayuki Akasaka (Japanese); Bryan Massey (English)

Rades Spirito (ラデス・スピーリト, Radesu Supīrito) is a necromancer exiled from the Purple Orcas for his feared Wraith Magic, which animates corpses with their original abilities. Joining the Eye of the Midnight Sun, he participates in attacks on the Royal Capital and Black Bulls base before being sacrificed in Patry's ritual. His last-moment spell acquisition allows self-resurrection, after which he revives allies Sally and Valtos. Forced to cooperate with the Black Bulls, he later binds Patry's soul to Licht's body for atonement. During the Spade Kingdom conflict, Rades reluctantly aids the Clover Kingdom's forces and later in the battle against Lucius.

==== Sally ====
Voiced by: Minami Tsuda (Japanese); Trina Nishimura (English)

Sally (サリー, Sarī) is a rogue mage specializing in Gel Magic, with an obsessive fascination for bizarre specimens—including Asta's anti-magic. Known for creating artificial bodies and augmenting magic through experimental tools, she joins the Eye of the Midnight Sun's attacks before being sacrificed in Patry's ritual. Resurrected by Rades, she reluctantly allies with the Black Bulls in exchange for studying Asta. Her analytical skills prove vital against elf Reve, deducing Dorothy Unsworth's dream magic. Following the elf conflict, she reforms by joining the Clover Kingdom's Magic Tool Research Lab, contributing her expertise during the Spade Kingdom invasion and later the battle against Lucius.

==== Catherine ====
Voiced by: Kimiko Jitsukawa (Japanese); Caitlin Glass (English)

Catherine (キャサリンス, Kyasarin) is an aging witch who uses Ash Magic to drain others' mana to preserve her youth. As one of Patry's subordinates, she attacks the Royal Capital before being defeated by Yuno and Charmy. Captured alongside Geork, Asta breaks their mental enchantment to expose Gueldre's treachery. She ultimately perishes during Patry's reincarnation ritual. Catherine's vanity-driven crimes and gruesome demise illustrate the destructive consequences of the Eye of the Midnight Sun's fanaticism.

=== Third Eye ===
The Third Eye serve as the Midnight Sun's elite warriors, consisting of Fana, Vetto, and Rhya—three Apostles of Sephira possessing human vessels. Their titles invert the Clover Kingdom's virtues: Fana represents Love, Vetto embodies Hope, and Rhya signifies Faith. When Patry activates the resurrection ritual, they join the other Apostles to complete the spell. After Zagred's defeat, most elves pass on to the afterlife, but the Third Eye remain since their host bodies lacked original souls. They choose to spend their continued existence making amends for their actions during the conflict, traveling the world to undo the damage caused by their possessed selves.

==== Rhya ====
Voiced by: Hirofumi Arai (episodes 35–39), Masakazu Morita (episodes 87–120) (Japanese); Brandon Potter (English)

Rhya (ライア, Raia), known as Disloyal (不実, Fujitsu), is an elf who wields Copy Magic, allowing him to replicate the abilities of others by touching their grimoires. Aware of hidden truths, he nonetheless supports Patry's efforts to revive the elves. His abilities enable him to impersonate figures like William Vangeance. After the elves' resurrection, he learns the devil Zagred is responsible for their genocide. Unable to return to his original body, he bids farewell to Licht. Rhya later aids the Magic Knights by rescuing and training them in Ultimate Magic in the Heart Kingdom. He ultimately joins the battle against Lucius and the Paladins to protect the Clover Kingdom.

==== Vetto ====
Voiced by: Masaya Takatsuka (Japanese); David Wald (English)

Vetto (ヴェット), titled Despair (絶望, Zetsubō), is an elf who wields powerful Beast Magic that greatly enhances his physical abilities. Once a peaceful companion of Licht, he is driven by vengeance following his sister's death. His magic manifests through a third eye, granting him potent regeneration and curse abilities. After a violent confrontation at the Sea Temple, he is killed by Yami. Later reincarnated in an artificial body, he aids Patry until Zagred's defeat leaves him unable to return to his original form. Vetto later assists the Magic Knights by training them in Ultimate Magic in the Heart Kingdom and joins the final battle against Lucius to defend the Clover Kingdom.

==== Fana ====
Voiced by: M.A.O (Japanese); Jeannie Tirado (English)

Fana (ファナ), known as Hateful (憎悪, Zōo), is an elf whose spirit incarnated into a Diamond Kingdom test subject who has the same name as her. The elf spirit gains control, acquires the fire spirit Salamander, and exhibits violent tendencies until the original human Fana resurfaces. After Mars purges the elf spirit, Rhya transfers it into an artificial body. Following Zagred's defeat, the elf bids farewell to Licht. The elf Fana later aids the Magic Knights, training them in Ultimate Magic. During the final battle, the elf Fana defends the Clover Kingdom against Lucius, while the human Fana reunites with Mars to confront Morris.

=== Diamond Kingdom ===
A rival kingdom east of the Clover Kingdom, the Diamond Kingdom (ダイヤモンド王国, Daiyamondo Ōkoku) is a land ruled by a despotic Magic Scholar named Morris, who controls the king and conduct experiments on children like Mars to create soldiers and bolster his country's military might. The strongest figures in the Diamond Kingdom's military are known as the Eight Shining Generals (八輝将, Hakkishō), considered equal in power to the Clover Kingdom's Magic Knight captains. While its territory expansion placed it at odds with the Clover Kingdom, the Diamond Kingdom ended up being mostly conquered by the Spade Kingdom.

==== Morris Libardirt ====
Voiced by: Masayuki Akasaka (Japanese); Chuck Huber (English)

Morris Libardirt (モリス・リバルダート, Morisu Ribarudāto) is a blind magic scholar who wields Modification Magic to alter physical and magical structures. Originally controlling the Diamond Kingdom through human experiments, he is exiled after Mars' coup and joins the Spade Kingdom. There, he accelerates the Qliphoth ritual by becoming Lucifero's host. After his defeat, Lucius resurrects him as a Paladin, curing his blindness and enhancing his powers. In this form, he battles Mereoleona, killing several Crimson Lions before she achieves Ultimate Flame Magic. Though incinerated, Morris is revived when Lucius activates the Grimoire Towers, transforming into a monstrous Paladin. He attempts to attack Asta while the mage is being healed by Mimosa, but is intercepted by former Diamond Kingdom allies who engage him in battle.

==== Lotus Whomalt ====
Voiced by: Kenyuu Horiuchi (Japanese); Brad Hawkins (English)
Portrayed by: Norihide Mantani (stage play)

Lotus Whomalt (ロータス・フーモルト, Rōtasu Fūmoruto) is a mage from the Diamond Kingdom, known as Lotus of the Abyss (奈落のロータス, Naraku no Rōtasu). He wields Smoke Magic, often employing tactics like poison gas. Following the exile of Morris, Lotus is forced to align with the Spade Kingdom but later turns against Morris after the mage forms a pact with Lucifero. During the battle against Lucius, he joins Mars and other Diamond Kingdom allies to confront Morris.

==== Mars ====
Voiced by: Yuichiro Umehara (Japanese); Jason Liebrecht (English)
Portrayed by: Shota Takasaki (stage play)

Mars (マルス, Marusu) is one of the Diamond Kingdom's Eight Shining Generals. He and Fana endure brutal experiments by Morris, forging a deep bond, though Mars believes Fana died during their escape. After a battle with Asta shifts his perspective, Mars resolves to reform his kingdom. He later discovers Fana survived, possessed by an elf, and uses the Witch Queen's blood to purge the spirit and overthrow Morris. He promises to reunite with Fana after stabilizing the Kingdom. Mars wields a combined Crystal and Fire Magic. During the final battle, he and Fana lead other Diamond Kingdom mages against Morris.

==== Ladros ====
Voiced by: Takeshi Kusao (Japanese); Chris Gardner (English)

Ladros (ラドロス, Radorosu) is one of the Diamond Kingdom's Eight Shining Generals. Born able to use magic but lacking a specific attribute, he develops a complex that is exacerbated by a reconstructive surgery granting him the ability to absorb and emit mana. Initially seeking power to eliminate rivals like Mars, he turns over a new leaf after being defeated by Asta. Ladros subsequently offers to aid Mars in reforming the Diamond Kingdom. During the battle against Lucius, he joins Mars and other allies to confront Morris.

==== Broccos ====
Voiced by: Ray Hurd

Broccos (ブロッコス, Burokkosu) is one of the Diamond Kingdom's Eight Shining Generals who uses magic to manipulate red ochre as a weapon. He is very impatient and angry and enjoys fighting in a reckless and straightforward manner, though he is shown to be protective of the men under his command. During the attack on Kiten he attempts to duel with Squad Captain William Vangeance but is easily defeated and immobilized. He is rescued by Lotus Whomalt as the Diamond Kingdom retreated.

==== Ragus ====
Voiced by: Wataru Tsuyuzaki (Japanese); Patryck McAlister (English)

Ragus (ラガス, Ragusu) is one of the Diamond Kingdoms's Eight Shining Generals who uses Lightning Magic. During the attack on Kiten he succeeds in breaking through the magical shield surrounding the city with powerful lightning arrows. He is impaled by Yuno's wind trident which throws him into a building.

==== Yagos ====
Voiced by: Genki Muro (Japanese); Bruce DuBose (English)

Yagos (ヤーゴス, Yāgosu) is one of the Diamond Kingdom's Eight Shining Generals whose use of Mucus Magic allows him to drain mana from his opponents. He is among the generals sent to attack Kiten before losing his right arm to Langris Vaude and being captured by the Black Bulls.

==== Feremena ====
Feremena (フェレメナ) is a mage of the Diamond Kingdom and one of the New Eight Shining Generals created through Morris's experiments. Wielding Earth Magic, she becomes the host of the Earth Spirit, a feat that leads Morris to consider her his greatest creation. During the battle against Lucius and the Paladins, she joins Mars, Ladros, and other allies from the Diamond Kingdom to confront Morris.

=== Dark Triad ===
The Dark Triad (漆黒の三極性(ダークトライアド), Dāku Toraiado) are three Zogratis siblings who overthrew Spade Kingdom's royal family. Each hosts a supreme devil—Dante (Lucifero), Vanica (Megicula), and Zenon (Beelzebub)—granting them immense power. Their goal involves creating the Tree of Qliphoth (クリフォトの樹, Kurifoto No Ki) to connect the human and underworlds, requiring William's World Tree Magic and Yami's Dark Magic. Their Dark Disciples serve as elite enforcers. Though defeated, their elder brother Lucius later resurrects them as part of his grand scheme. The Triad's reign of terror forces the Clover and Heart Kingdoms into an unprecedented alliance for survival.

==== Dante Zogratis ====
Voiced by: Rikiya Koyama (Japanese); Patrick Seitz (English)

Dante Zogratis (ダンテ・ゾグラティス, Dante Zoguratisu) leads the Dark Triad as Lucifero's host, wielding both Gravity and Body Magic. A sociopathic aristocrat, he believes evil defines humanity and overthrew the Spade Kingdom seeking greater challenges. His assault on the Black Bulls' base demonstrates terrifying power until Asta's sacrifice wounds him. Enhanced by Morris, he battles Nacht and Jack before Magna defeats him in an exhausting magical duel. This severs his connection to Lucifero, leaving him powerless when Jack finishes him. Dante's arc exemplifies the series' theme that true strength comes from bonds, not cruelty.

==== Zenon Zogratis ====
Voiced by: Tatsuhisa Suzuki (Japanese); Zeno Robinson (English)

Zenon Zogratis (ゼノン・ゾグラティス, Zenon Zoguratisu) is the youngest Dark Triad member and host of Beelzebub, wielding Spatial and Bone Magic. Once kind-hearted, he turned cold after killing his friend Allen to stop a devil. His ruthless attack on the Golden Dawn leaves half dead as he captures William. After Yuno impales him with Spirit of Euros, Zenon fully merges with Beelzebub, gaining a devil heart. Though overpowered by Yuno's second grimoire, Zenon recognizes their parallel paths in his final moments—one embracing bonds, the other rejecting them. His arc highlights the series' theme of human connection versus isolation.

==== Vanica Zogratis ====
Voiced by: Yui Ogura (Japanese); Lindsay Seidel (English)

Vanica Zogratis (ヴァニカ・ゾグラティス, Vanika Zoguratisu) is a Dark Triad member hosting Megicula, wielding deadly Curse-Warding and Blood Magic. A battle-hungry hedonist, she cursed Acier Silva and Lolopechka for amusement. Her assault on the Heart Kingdom demonstrates terrifying power as she defeats its strongest mages while toying with Noelle. Though initially reveling in their rematch, Vanica becomes Megicula's puppet when the devil attempts to sacrifice her for full manifestation. Megicula's destruction leaves Vanica barely alive—a fitting end for one who treated life as mere entertainment. Her arc serves as a dark parallel to Noelle's growth.

==== Dark Disciples ====
- Gaderois Godroc (ガデロア・ゴドロック, Gaderoa Godorokku) is one of the Dark Disciples who accompanies Zenon during the attack on the Golden Dawn base. He uses Stone Magic, which he uses to create stone fists. Due to the demon's power, his stone is harder than iron or steel and can resist multiple simultaneous attacks without taking damage. Gaderois is voiced by Michitake Kikuchi in Japanese and Jarrod Greene in English.
- Foyal Migusteau (フォヤル・ミグストー, Foyaru Migusutō) is one of the Dark Disciples who accompanies Zenon during the attack on the Golden Dawn base. He uses Mist Magic, which he uses to create illusions of himself to confuse his opponents. Due to the demon's power, he can condense his mist into water projectiles strong enough to destroy steel. Foyal is voiced by Wataru Tsuyuzaki in Japanese and Brent Mukai in English.
- Svenkin Gatard (スヴェンキン・ガタード, Suvenkin Gatādo) is one of the Dark Disciples who accompanies Vanica during the attack on the Heart Kingdom. He uses Skin Magic, which he uses to manipulate his skin and its properties. Due to Megicula's power, his skin can nullify magic attacks by becoming softer or harder. He battles Luck, and is later killed when Vanica detonates the devil power she gave her disciples, turning them into bombs as a final attack on the Heart Kingdom. Svenkin is voiced by Bill Butts in English.
- Sivoir Snyle (シーヴワル・スナイル, Shīvuwaru Sunairu) is one of the Dark Disciples who accompanies Vanica during the attack on the Heart Kingdom. He uses Eyeball Magic, which he uses to create and control eyeballs which detect people's strength, stamina, magic, and movements. Due to Megicula's power, he can use this information to predict his opponent's next move, and snipes them with a magic bullet from a distance. Sivoir is voiced by Makoto Sahara in Japanese and Anthony DiMascio in English.
- Halbet Chevour (ハールベート・シュヴール, Hārubēto Shuvūru) is one of the Dark Disciples who accompanies Vanica during the attack on the Heart Kingdom. She uses Hair Magic, which she uses to grow and control her hair. Due to Megicula's power, her hair is tough, infinitely growing, and free-moving. Halbet is voiced by Miyuki Satou in Japanese and Elizabeth Maxwell in English.
- Hischer Ongg (ヒッシャー・オング, Hisshā Ongu) is one of the Dark Disciples who accompanies Vanica during the attack Heart Kingdom. He uses Nail Magic, which he uses to lengthen and sharpen his nails. Due to Megicula's power, his nails are able to get even longer and become as sharp as daggers. Hischer is voiced by Kevin D. Thelwell in English.
- Robero Ringert (ロベロ・リンゲルト, Robero Ringeruto) is one of the Dark Disciples who accompanies Vanica during the attack Heart Kingdom. He uses Tongue Magic, which he uses to enlarge and harden his tongue. Due to Megicula's power, his tongue is able to get enlarged, lengthened, and immensely hardened. Robero is voiced by Wataru Tsuyuzaki in Japanese and Jeremy Inman in English.

=== Lucius Zogratis ===
Voiced by: Toshiyuki Morikawa^{Ep. 178}

Lucius Zogratis (ルシウス・ゾグラティス, Rushiusu Zoguratisu) is the eldest sibling of the Dark Triad, possessing two souls—his own and Julius Novachrono's. His Soul Magic alters souls through touch, while his pact with Astaroth grants Time Magic abilities. Obsessed with creating a perfect world, he sacrifices his siblings to develop the Paladins (聖騎士, Paradin)—humans merged with purified devils. After consuming Lucifero's power and acquiring gravity magic, he launches his final plan to remake society. His assault on the Clover Kingdom employs an army of Paladins, including revived warriors like Morgen, Acier, and Morris, wielding combined devil and human magic to enforce his vision. After a long, hard battle, Noelle helps to distract Lucius long enough for Asta and Yuno to deal the finishing blows; one destroys Lucius and the other releases Julius. Julius is then able to clean up Lucius's destruction by using the last of his time magic to restore the Kingdom back to before the Judgment Day attack began, and then dies in peace, with the torch of protecting the Kingdom passed to the Magic Knights.

=== Devils ===
The Devil Race (悪魔族, Akuma-zoku), or demons, are monstrous beings from the Underworld (冥府, Meifu) whose only amusement comes from tormenting each other and other races from the living world. Devils tend to manifest within the living world during strange occurrences, usually by forming pacts with mages who become Devil hosts (悪魔憑き, Akumatsuki) though there are occasions where a devil can bring its body to the living world.

==== Zagred ====
Voiced by: Showtaro Morikubo (Japanese); Kellen Goff (English)

Zagred (ザグレド, Zaguredo) is a high-ranking devil who orchestrated the elves' genocide 500 years prior. His Word Soul Magic manipulates reality through speech, while Reincarnation Magic transfers souls between bodies. After possessing Licht's failed attempt, he was sealed by Secre but ensured elf reincarnation. Manipulating Patry's ritual, he regains physical form and claims Licht's five-leaf grimoire. In the Shadow Palace battle, he faces Asta's group and the restored Licht/Lumiere. Asta ultimately destroys him by bisecting his heart, with Liebe mocking his demise. Zagred's machinations demonstrate the devils' reality-warping threat to the human world.

==== Lucifero ====
Voiced by: Jeremy Schwartz (English)

Lucifero (ルチフェロ, Ruchifero) is the King of Devils who possesses Gravity Magic. Initially hosted by Dante Zogratis, he later manifests through the Qliphoth tree after Morris's sacrifice. Though his partial manifestation overwhelms the Magic Knights, Asta's perfected Devil Union defeats him. His remaining essence is consumed by Lucius to gain gravity powers.

==== Astaroth ====
Astaroth (アスタロト, Asutaroto) is one of the three highest ranking devils that left the underworld years ago and currently resides in the body of Lucius, possessing Time Magic.

==== Beelzebub ====
Voiced by: Wataru Tsuyuzaki^{Ep. 178}

Beelzebub (ベルゼブブ, Beruzebubu) is one of the three highest ranking devils that made its home in the Spade Kingdom, his Spatial Magic allowing him to create portals and dimensional spaces that control mana. Initially residing in the body of Zenon Zogratis, Beelzebub is later purified by Lucius and placed within the body of Lily Aquaria.

==== Megicula ====
Voiced by: Genki Muro (giant form), Nozomi (Japanese); Christopher Smith (giant form) (English)

Megicula (メギキュラ, Megikyura) is a supreme devil of curses who inhabits Vanica Zogratis. Her Curse-Warding Magic (呪符魔法, Jufu Mahō) makes even speaking her name dangerous. She orchestrated Acier Silva's death as part of her Malevolent Femcantation (邪心女呪音, Jashin Jojuin) ritual to manifest fully. After cursing Lolopechka, she partially manifests when Vanica falls, overpowering Noelle's group until Nozel and Noelle destroy her heart. Her defeat demonstrates humanity's resilience against devilkind's machinations.

==== Lilith and Naamah ====
Voiced by: Satsuki Kokubu (Japanese); Jamie Lee (English) (Lilith)
Voiced by: Satsuki Kokubu (Japanese); Trey Upton (English) (Naamah)

Lilith (リリス, Ririsu) and Naamah (ナハマー, Nahamā) are the twin Supreme Devils from Qliphoth's first level, manifesting through the world tree. Lilith wields Devil Ice Magic while Naamah commands Devil Fire Magic, combining to create freezing suns in their merged form. After nearly killing Nacht during their emergence, they are challenged by Asta's anti-magic. Their growing fear becomes evident as Asta counters their attacks, culminating in Nacht restraining them for Asta's finishing blow. Their defeat marks the first major victory against the Qliphoth's manifested devils.

==== Gimodelo, Slotos, Plumede, and Walgner ====
Voiced by: Hiro Shimono (Japanese); Ray Chase (Gimodelo) (English) (English)

Gimodelo (ギモデロ, Gimodero), Slotos (スロトス, Surotosu), Plumede (プルメデ, Purumede) and Walgner (ワルグナ, Waruguna) are four mid-level devils hosted by Nacht Faust that manifest through his Shadow Magic. Each is represented by animal masks referencing the Town Musicians of Bremen. Gimodelo (dog mask) grants "Pack" ability to create shadow hounds in Devil Union. Slotos (donkey mask) provides "Toughness" for enhanced strength and durability. Plumede (cat mask) offers "Agility" for superior speed and evasion. Walgner (rooster mask) enables "Call" to produce stunning sound waves. These devils serve as Nacht's primary combat assets, allowing versatile tactical options through individual unions or combined forms. Their presence reflects Nacht's complex relationship with devilkind following his brother's death.

==== Adrammelech ====
Adrammelech (アドラメレク, Adoramereku) is a high-ranking Supreme Devil from the underworld's second level who wields Light Magic. An apathetic being, he harbors no particular malice toward humans and previously refused to fight for Lucifero. Following Lucifero's defeat, Adrammelech takes the demon's heart and presents it to Lucius Zogratis. He later observes the battles on Judgment Day with amusement, noting outcomes Lucius did not foresee. Confronted by the monstrous Paladin Morgen Faust, Adrammelech offers to aid Yami Sukehiro, proposing a pact to become his devil familiar. Yami accepts, gaining Light Magic and using it to defeat Morgen.

==== Lucifugus ====
Lucifugus (ルキフグス, Rukifugusu) is one of the highest ranking devils who served under Lucifero, Astaroth, and Beelzebub, wielding Dark Magic. An attempt by the Faust family to bind it to their son Nacht fails, resulting in the devil wiping out most of the family. Nacht's twin, Morgen, intervenes and breaks the summoning relic, an act that fatally wounds him. Lucius later resurrects Morgen as a Paladin, incarnating a purified Lucifugus within him. This fusion grants Morgen the devil's Dark Magic alongside his original Light Magic. As a Paladin, Morgen fights Nacht, Yami, and Ichika, persisting even after defeat and resurrection into a more monstrous form.

==== Baal ====
Baal (バアル, Baaru) is a high-ranking devil from the Underworld who wields Air Magic. Before Lucius's judgment day, Lucius purifies Baal using his soul magic and incarnates the devil into Damnatio Kira, transforming him into a Paladin. This fusion grants Damnatio Air Magic alongside his innate Scale Magic. As a Paladin, Damnatio confronts the Black Bulls and the witches in the Forest of Witches to prevent Asta's retrieval. After a difficult battle, Asta returns and defeats Damnatio using his Zetten technique, rendering the Paladin comatose. Asta vows to save Damnatio from Lucius's control.

== Other characters ==
=== Orsi Orfai ===
Voiced by: Yōji Ueda (OVA), Kazuki Nakao (anime) (Japanese); Brian Mathis (English)

Father Orsi Orfai (オルジ・オーファイ, Oruji Ōfai) is the Priest of the Church in Hage Village who also runs the orphanage where Asta and Yuno grew up. He treats both boys as his foster sons along with every other orphan under his care. He leans towards being overdramatic in expressing his fatherly feelings for Yuno and Asta after they leave the orphanage, frequently rushing to hug them only to fall flat on his face after they dodge out of the way. He is able to cast Fire Magic and operate a flying broomstick. During the elf reincarnation arc, he and the rest of Hage Village are attacked by a Purple Orca possessed magic knight but is saved by Asta and Yuno.

=== Lily Aquaria ===
Voiced by: Ai Kayano (OVA), Miyu Kubota (anime) (Japanese); Dawn M. Bennett (English)

Sister Lily Aquaria (リリー・アクアリア, Rirī Akuaria) is a nun who raised Asta and Yuno in Hage Village after leaving the noble realm due to discrimination. Skilled in Water Magic, she often disciplines Asta with giant water fists when he proposes marriage. During the elf conflict, she helps defend Hage Village from possessed magic knights. After the Spade Kingdom war, Lucius transforms her into a Paladin by binding a purified Beelzebub to her soul, granting Spatial Magic. As one of Lucius's enforcers, she invades the Land of the Sun before being stopped by Asta and the Ryuzen Seven.

=== Rebecca Scarlet ===
Voiced by: Rikako Yamaguchi (Japanese); Rachael Messer (English)

Rebecca Scarlet (レベッカ・スカーレット, Rebekka Sukāretto) is a young red-haired woman who takes care of her five younger siblings to the point that most mistakenly assume she is their mother. Rebecca first meets Asta when forced by her friends to participate in a group date, gradually warming up to him upon realizing they have a lot in common. It bloomed into a crush after Asta defends her from a drunken bully, though Rebecca eventually decides not to proceed with it after noticing Noelle's feelings despite kissing him on the cheek after he saved her siblings.

=== Theresa Rapual ===
Voiced by: Rei Igarashi (Japanese); Linda Leonard (English)

Sister Theresa Rapual (テレジア・ラプアール, Terejia Rapuāru) is a retired Crimson Lion mage turned nun, bearing a distinctive facial scar from her past. Formerly Fuegoleon Vermillion's magic instructor, she left the knights after growing weary of child casualties. Now caring for orphans including Marie Adlai, she limits Gauche's visits due to his obsessive tendencies. During the Nean Village incident, she demonstrates formidable combat skills despite her age while rescuing kidnapped children. Her bravery earns Gauche's newfound respect. After recovering from injuries sustained in battle, she returns to her orphanage duties, maintaining her protective role over the children in her care.

=== Marie Adlai ===
Voiced by: Hitomi Sasaki (Japanese); Apphia Yu (English)

Marie Adlai (マリー・アドレイ, Marī Adorei) is Gauche's younger sister. After their expulsion from the family estate, Gauche turns to crime to provide for her until his arrest leads her to an orphanage overseen by Sister Theresa. Marie is later kidnapped from Hage Village but is rescued by Asta, Gauche, and Sister Theresa. During the elf reincarnation, her body is possessed by the elf Eclat (エクラ, Ekura), who wields Eye Magic that requires no grimoire. Marie is restored after Asta exorcises the spirit. She attends Asta's trial where he saves her from an attempt on her life. During the Spade Kingdom invasion, she witnesses Asta's battle against an ancient demon. In the final conflict against Lucius, Gauche protects her from an attack and keeps her nearby while he assists Captain Rill against a Lucius clone and the Angels.

=== Neige ===
Voiced by: Kōhei Amasaki (Japanese); Greg Ayres (English)

Neige (ネージュ, Nēju) is a rogue mage and the younger brother of Baro who wields Snow Magic. He assists Baro in kidnapping children, motivated by both fear of his brother and an obsessive desire for friendship. After being rescued from Baro's mud monster form by Asta, Neige turns on his brother, freezing him solid and vowing revenge on those who corrupted him. Moved by Asta's offer of friendship, he accepts arrest and is sentenced to community service at Sister Theresa's church. Neige later participates in the final battle against Lucius and the Paladins, fighting of his own free will to help others.

=== Baro ===
Voiced by: Genki Muro (Japanese); Chris Rager (English)

Baro (バロ) is a dark-haired mage who possesses Mud Magic and spectacles to measure a person's mana. A low-level thug, he is hired by Sally to collect mana by stealing it from children. During his attempt to drain mana from the children of Nean Village, which included the siblings of Rebecca Scarlet and Gauche Adlai's sister, he requested Sally's help after being defeated and tied up. While Baro intended to quickly flee the moment he is freed, he ends up being subjected to Sally's Reverse Magic Tool which causes him to be consumed by his magic and turned into a giant monster. He is defeated by Asta, Gauche and Sister Theresa with his remains frozen solid by Neige.

=== Fanzell Kruger ===
Voiced by: Satoshi Mikami (Japanese); Eric Vale (English)

Fanzell (ファンゼル・クルーガ, Fanzeru Kurūgā) is a Wind Magic user, swordsman, and former commander of the Diamond Kingdom's army. He deserts the Kingdom with his fiancée Dominante and students, growing tired of its cruelty. After becoming separated and training Asta in swordsmanship, he eventually reunites with Dominante. He later assists Asta during the Forest of Witches incident, where he reconnects with Mars and takes Fana under his protection. During the battle against Lucius, Fanzell and Dominante join Mars and other allies to confront Morris.

=== Dominante Code ===
Voiced by: Misako Tomioka (Japanese); Katelyn Barr (English)

Dominante Code (ドミナント・コード, Dominanto Kōdo) is a mage from the Forest of Witches who formerly served the Diamond Kingdom. She is highly skilled in crafting magical tools such as wands, flying broomsticks, and invisibility cloaks. Dominante deserts the Diamond Kingdom with her fiancé Fanzell, fleeing to the Clover Kingdom. In battle, she wields a magic wand decorated with a purple rose that she crafted herself. She later assists Asta and his allies during the Forest of Witches incident. Dominante and Fanzell subsequently join Mars, Fana, and other Diamond Kingdom allies to confront the Paladin Morris.

=== Mariella ===
Voiced by: Sayaka Senbongi (Japanese); Alexis Tipton (English)

Mariella (マリエラ, Mariera) is an Ice Magic user and former student of Fanzell. Initially a ruthless assassin sent to retrieve deserters, she feigns desertion from the Diamond Kingdom. After meeting Asta, she genuinely defects and helps the Black Bulls defeat her former allies. She lives with Fanzell and Dominante to atone for her past, later assisting them during the Forest of Witches incident. During the battle against Lucius, Mariella joins Fanzell and other Diamond Kingdom allies to confront Morris.

=== Licht ===
Voiced by: Takahiro Sakurai (Japanese); Jerry Jewell (English)

Licht (リヒト, Rihito), leader of the Elves, wielded Sword Magic and originally owned Asta's five-leaf grimoire. He advocated elf-human coexistence, befriending Lumiere and marrying Tetia. When Zagred orchestrated their massacre, Licht transformed into a monster to resist possession, forcing Lumiere to kill him. Centuries later, Patry revived Licht's soul in an artificial body, though his consciousness remained dormant. After battling Asta and Yuno, his full personality resurfaces during Zagred's defeat. Licht helps vanquish the devil before passing on with his people, while his vessel remains for Patry's use. His lineage survives in Elysia through his surviving child.

=== Acier Silva ===
Voiced by: Kana Yūki (Japanese); Luci Christian (English)

Acier Silva (アシエ・シルヴァ, Ashie Shiruva) is the late matriarch of House Silva and former Silver Eagles captain, wielding Steel Magic. Cursed to death by Megicula, her soul is freed when Noelle and Nozel defeat the devil. Lucius later resurrects her as a Paladin by merging her with a water devil, granting enhanced powers. Forced to battle her children, she critiques their growth while expressing maternal love. Noelle, empowered by a Sea God contract, leads her siblings in defeating their mother. Though destroyed, Acier revives again when Lucius activates the Grimoire Towers, returning in a monstrous Paladin form to continue the assault.

=== Agrippa Family ===
Voiced by: Kenichirou Matsuda (Japanese); Mike McFarland (English)

Nathan Agrippa (ネイサン・アグリッパ, Neisan Agurippa), Jonna Agrippa (ヨンナ・アグリッパ, Yon'na Agurippa), Roxanne Agrippa (ロクサーヌ・アグリッパ, Rokusānu Agurippa) and Nilenia Agrippa (ニレニア・アグリッパ, Nirenia Agurippa) are Gordon's parents, little sister and paternal grandmother, respectively. The family members all share Gordon's peculiar physical features and a vast knowledge of various poison, curse and acid magic.

=== Licita ===
Voiced by: Kaori Ishihara (Japanese); Felecia Angelle (English)

Licita (リチタ, Richita) is Asta's biological mother and the adoptive mother of Liebe. Her body is cursed to absorb the magic and life force of others, though she possesses a unique storage magic for containing objects without mana. Fearing she would harm her son, she leaves Asta at Hage Village's church. Even though she had to leave her son, she never stopped loving him. She later discovers Liebe, a devil with no magic who is immune to her curse, and raises him as her own. When Lucifero attempts to possess Liebe, Licita sacrifices herself to save him, sealing the devil into a five-leaf grimoire. Lucius later conjures a perfect illusion of Licita to psychologically torment Asta and Liebe.

=== Dryad ===
Voiced by: Sara Matsumoto

Dryad (ドリアーデ, Doriāde) is the guardian deity of Elysia near the heart kingdom where the surviving elves now live. She has the ability to see the near future and helps teach Noelle and the others how to use ultimate magic before their battle with devils.

=== Morgen Faust ===
Voiced by: Hiro Shimono

Morgen Faust (モルゲン・ファウスト, Morugen Fausuto) is Nacht's twin brother and former Gray Deer member, known for his kindness contrasting Nacht's selfishness. He dies stopping Nacht's devil contract attempt, expressing his wish to protect people together. Lucius later revives him as a Paladin with enhanced Light and Dark Magic abilities. In this state, he battles Yami and Nacht, psychologically tormenting his brother about their past. With Ichika's assistance, Yami and Nacht ultimately defeat Morgen using combined Dark Magic techniques. However, Lucius later reanimates him in a more monstrous form through the Grimoire Towers' power. The revived Morgen disturbingly invites his former allies to fight alongside him.
