= Merello =

Merello is a surname. Notable people with the surname include:

- Eugenio Merello (born 1940), Italian former water polo player
- Rubaldo Merello (1872–1922), Italian painter and sculptor
- Tita Merello (1904–2002), Argentine actress, dancer and singer
