= Mariela =

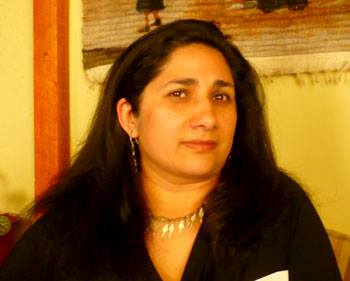
Women with name Mariela

Mariela is a given name. Notable people with the name include:

- Mariela Antoniska (born 1975), Argentine field hockey goalkeeper in the national women's team (won Olympic medals in 2000 & 2004)
- Mariela Belski (born 1971), Argentine feminist lawyer and human rights activist
- Mariela Castro (born 1962), the director of the Cuban National Center for Sex Education in Havana and an activist for LGBT rights in Cuba
- Mariela González (born 1974), Cuban athlete
- Mariela Griffor (born 1961), Chilean journalist and poet
- Mariela Muñoz (1943–2017), Argentine transsexual activist
- Mariela Ortiz (born 1976), American voice actress, DVD coordinator, production assistant who works for ADV Films
- Mariela Pérez (born 1946), Venezuelan pageant titleholder
