= Rikako Yamaguchi =

Japanese voice actress from Tokyo

- 山口 立花子
- Born: Tokyo, Japan
- Occupation: Voice actress
- Agent: Sun Music Production

Rikako Yamaguchi (山口 立花子, Yamaguchi Rikako) is a Japanese voice actress from Tokyo. She is affiliated with Sun Music Production.

== Filmography ==
=== Anime television ===
- Red Garden (2006), Mary, Mireille
- Penguindrum (2011), Female fan 1, Passenger A, Librarian, Girl, Boy
- Chitose Get You!! (2012), Kouhai-sensei
- From the New World (2012), Ryō Inaba
- Gon (2012), Pūsuke, Sū, Prairie dog, Baby Elephant
- Hiiro no Kakera: The Tamayori Princess Saga (2012), Osaki-ko
- Hiiro no Kakera: The Tamayori Princess Saga Season 2 (2012), Osaki-ko
- Lagrange: The Flower of Rin-ne (2012), Sachi Nogami
- Lagrange: The Flower of Rin-ne Season 2 (2012), Sachi Nogami, Michi Kondō
- Lego Friends: The Tale of Sparkly Friends (2012), Stephanie
- Ace of Diamond (2013), Takako Fujiwara, Field Announcer
- Devil Survivor 2: The Animation (2013), Fumi Kanno
- Freezing Vibration (2013), Charles Bonaparte
- Neppu Kairiku Bushi Road (2013), Saki
- Outbreak Company (2013), Edward Theodore Pertini, Luna
- Akame ga Kill! (2014), Monjirō
- Baby Steps (2014), Yuki, Announcer
- Gonna be the Twin-Tail!! (2014), Kotori Tarui, Female student B
- Mobile Suit Gundam-san (2014), Fraw-san
- Persona 4: The Animation (2014), Nozomi
- Sakura Trick (2014), Third year female student
- Yona of the Dawn (2014), Girl, Medical official, Mother, Taso's Wife, Villager, Wind Clan Member, Woman, Young lady
- Ace of Diamond: Second Season (2015), Takako Fujiwara, Field Announcer
- Lance N' Masques (2015), Francois Ming
- Nyuru Nyuru!! Kakusen-kun Season 2 (2015), Yamaguchi
- Rampo Kitan: Game of Laplace (2015), Narrator, Nurse, Copycat Criminal, Helicopter Reporter
- Unlimited Fafnir (2015), Miyako Shinomiya
- YuruYuri San Hai! (2015), Takane Dezaki
- Bakuon!! (2016), Hijiri Minowa
- Black Clover (2017), Rebecca Scarlet
- Hulaing Babies (2019), Shiina
- Kunon the Sorcerer Can See (2026), Jenie Kors

=== OVA ===
- Rinne no Lagrange: Kamogawa Days (2012), Sachi Nogami
- Neppu Kairiku Bushi Road (2013), Saki
- Bakuon!! (2016), Hijiri Minowa

=== Video games ===
- Corpse Party: Blood Drive (2014), Aiko Niwa

=== Anime Film ===
- Alice in Dreamland (2015), Tweedledum, Tweedledee

=== Dubbing ===
- Freaky, Sandra (Emily Holder)
- In Time (2025 BS10 Star Channel edition), Michele Weis (Bella Heathcote)
- The Marksman, Rosa (Teresa Ruiz)
