= Morella =

Morella may refer to:

== Places ==
- Morella, Castellón, an ancient city, Valencian Community, Spain
- Morella, Queensland, now part of Longreach, Australia
- La Morella, a mountain in Catalonia, Spain

== People ==
- Connie Morella (born 1931), a Republican US politician
- Morella Muñoz (born 1935), Venezuelan mezzo-soprano
- Morella Joseph, politician from St Lucia

== Biology ==
- Morella, a plant genus associated with Myrica
- Morella (fungus), a genus in the family Olpidiaceae

== Other uses ==
- Morella (short story), by Edgar Allan Poe
- SS Morella, a steamship
- Morella's Forest, a US band

== See also ==
- Marella (disambiguation)
- Morello (disambiguation)
