= David Houle (biologist) =

American biologist

- Education: State University of New York at Stony Brook
- Scientific career
- Workplaces: Florida State University, Tallahassee, Florida

David Houle is an evolutionary biologist who studies fruitflies as an experimental organism for understanding adaptation and behavior. He is a Professor of Biological Science at Florida State University.

His experimental contributions include studies of evolution of wing shape in the genus Drosophila, the evolution of the ability to evolve, and adaptation under natural and sexual selection. His theoretical contributions have included work on good genes mechanisms in sexual selection, the evolution of variance-covariance matrices, the detection of evolutionary constraints, and the use of fluctuating asymmetry as an indicator of developmental stability.
