= Dave Houle =

American high school coach (born 1953)

David C. Houle
Personal information
- Born: 1953 (age 72–73) Dugway, Utah

David C. Houle, born in 1953 in Dugway, Utah, is a prominent high school coach in the United States known for his extensive success in girls' basketball, track, and cross-country.

Houle commenced his coaching career at the age of 12 in 1965 and has since been recognized for his achievements by being inducted into the National High School Coaches Association Hall of Fame. Houle accumulated numerous state championships, earning recognition from USA Today as one of the most successful high school coaches in America.

Houle served as the coach for the junior varsity basketball team at Southern Utah University from 1976 to 1977, high school football at Milford High School from 1977 to 1978, football and basketball at Carbon High School from 1978 to 1979, and football at the College of Eastern Utah from 1978 to 1979.

During his tenure at Mountain View High School (Utah) from 1980 to 2006, the athletic program gained recognition on a national scale. The school achieved national championships in boys' cross-country (3) and girls' cross-country (3). Additionally, they secured an ESPN National Championship in girls' basketball in 2001. The program also set numerous national records, contributing to its widespread recognition across the country. Houle resigned in 2006 amid allegations of inappropriate conduct during a road trip with his basketball team. Houle reportedly permitted two girls to sleep in his room. This action violated several rules regarding team members' use of his hotel room. He said that his decision to retire was unrelated to the allegations.

Houle served as an assistant track coach at Utah Valley University from 2007 to 2009 and an assistant men's basketball coach at Kennesaw State University from 2010 to 2011.

== Awards ==
Dale Rex Dale Rex Award
