= Marielle Houle =

Canadian woman

Marielle Houle is a Canadian woman who helped her ailing son Charles Fariala commit suicide in September 2004 as he struggled with the early stages of multiple sclerosis.

== The suicide ==
On 28 September 2004, Fariala summoned his mother to his home to complete the death pact he had researched and refined over several months. After thanking her for not abandoning him in his last hours, Fariala consumed a mixture of pills and medication. He lay down in his bed and had Houle restrain his hands with leather cuffs. When he was in a deep slumber, Houle placed a mask over his face and slipped a plastic bag over his head. After he had stopped breathing, she called the police and confessed her part in the death of her son.

== The sentence ==
Houle pleaded guilty to a charge of helping her son commit suicide, thus liable to imprisonment for a term not exceeding 14 years, under the provision of s. 241(b) of the Criminal Code. By the decision of Quebec Superior Court, she was spared jail time and was sentenced to three years of probation on 27 January 2006. Justice Maurice Laramée motivated his sentence by the emotional, psychological (borderline personality) and physical fragility of the accused. He insisted that the sentence is not set to serve as a general model in other cases and warned others who might consider emulating Houle that assisted suicide and mercy killing remains a serious crime in Canada for which the law has no tolerance.
