= David Houle (futurist) =

American author (born 1948)

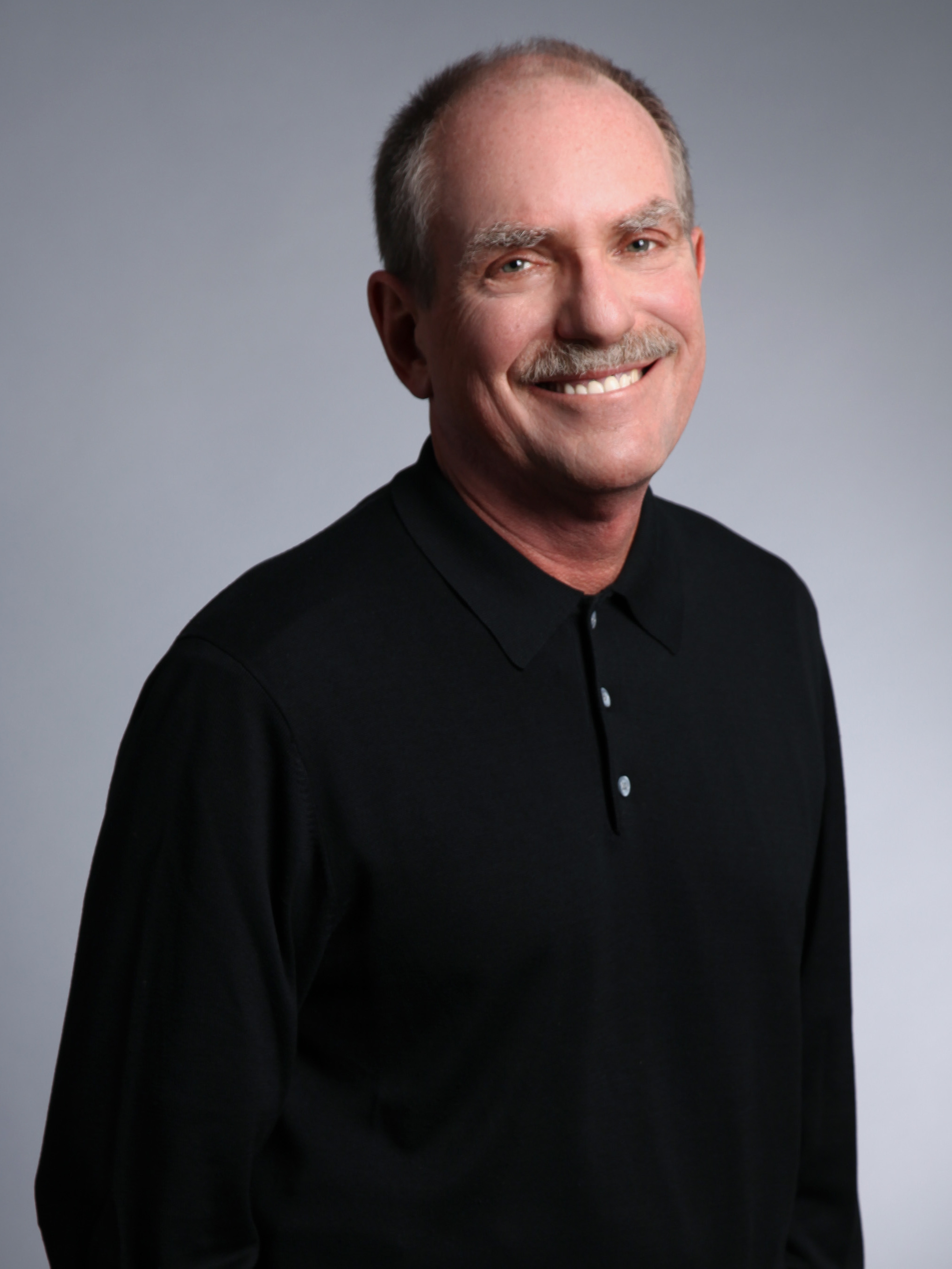
- Houle in 2013
- Born: July 3, 1948 (age 78); Chicago, Illinois, U.S.
- Occupations: Futurist; entrepreneur; writer
- Known for: The Shift Age
- Website: www.davidhoule.com

David Houle (born 3 July 1948) is a futurist, keynote speaker, and author of The Shift Age. He coined the phrase "The Shift Age" and identified this new age as the successor to the Information Age in 2007.

== Early life ==
David Houle was born on July 3, 1948, in Chicago, Illinois. He grew up in the Hyde Park neighborhood of Chicago. His parents were Bettie E. Houle (d. 2000) and Cyril O. Houle (d. 1998). His mother earned a PhD from the University of Chicago in child development, was active in the community and numerous charities, and served a two-year term as president of the Fortnightly Club of Chicago. His father Cyril O. Houle was a professor at the University of Chicago in the field of adult education, who wrote 12 books and was awarded 14 honorary degrees.

Houle attended the University of Chicago Laboratory School from nursery school through high school. After graduating from high school in 1965, he obtained a B.A. in art history from Syracuse University in 1969.

== Career ==
Houle spent more than 20 years in media and entertainment. In the mid-1970s he worked first at NBC, then at CBS in advertising sales. He then joined the executive team that created and launched MTV, Nickelodeon, VH1 and CNN Headline News, serving in senior advertising sales capacities.

In the early 1990s, he created programming for television. He won two Emmy Awards for a nationally syndicated children's program Energy Express. He represented Bill Kurtis and Kurtis Productions, helping to launch such series as Investigative Reports and American Justice on the A&E cable television network. Along with Jack Myers he created Television Production Partners (TPP), a consortium of advertisers to fund television programming. In this capacity he won a George Foster Peabody Award, the Crystal Heart Award at the Heartland Film Festival, and was nominated for an Academy Award for the documentary Hank Aaron: Chasing the Dream.

Later in the 1990s Houle was managing director of University Access, an e-learning company based in Los Angeles. Following the return to his hometown Chicago in 2001, he worked both as an advisor to companies and a speaker on the future of education and technology.

== Futurist ==
Houle has been speaking about The Shift Age as a professional speaker since 2007. In 2009, he won a Speaker of the Year Award from Vistage International. In April 2007, he spoke at the Foundation for the Future Energy Conference 3000, and his blog columns on this conference with interviews with the attending scientists were published by the foundation in its report. Houle has spoken at numerous international conferences and corporate retreats to CEOs and business owners. During 2010–2011, he delivered 300+ speeches in ten countries on six continents. As a futurist, Houle has cited Alvin Toffler and Marshall McLuhan as his major influences, while Michael Reiss of Arts Management Magazine referred to Houle as “Toffler’s heir apparent.” Since 2012, Houle has been the "Futurist in Residence" and a Guest Lecturer at the Ringling College of Art and Design in Sarasota, Florida.

Houle was interviewed and featured on Forum, issue no.1, 2012, Deutsche Bank's in-house magazine regarding Occupy Wall Street. He has delivered five TEDx talks, among them The Concept of Place has Changed Forever, which has garnered over 370,000 views as of March 2023.

Houle is also a member of The Good Future Project, a global, non-profit network of future-focused individuals and creators.

== Writings ==
Houle started his writing career in 2006 by launching his futurist blog "evolutionshift.com" with the tag line A Future Look at Today. In late 2007, his first book The Shift Age was published.

In February 2010, he became a featured contributor on Oprah.com. He also has articles featured on Shelly Palmer's website.

Houle's second book, co-authored with Jeff Cobb, titled Shift Ed: A Call to Action for Transforming K-12, was published in March 2011. His third book, co-authored with Jonathan Fleece, The New Health Age: The Future of Health Care in America, was published in December 2011.

Houle's Entering the Shift Age was published by Sourcebooks in 2012.

Is Privacy Dead: The Future of Privacy in the Digital Age and Brand Shift: The Future of Brands and Marketing were published in 2013 and 2014, respectively. In 2015, he co-authored The Spaceship Earth with Tim Rumage, and wrote Moving to a Finite Earth Economy - Crew Manual: The Complete Trilogy with Bob Leonard in 2019.

2020 saw the publication of The 2020s: The Most Disruptive Decade in History: Book 1, by Houle & Associates. In 2021, Houle authored The 2020s: A Decade of Cognitive Dissonance. His most recent book is The 2020s: The Golden Age of Design and Redesign, with James Fathers, also in 2021.

In 2022, Houle launched the newsletter Evolution Shift, about all aspects of humanity’s future in the 21st century.

== Awards and honors ==
- Brand Shift was named one of the top five marketing books published in the world in 2014 by M&SB
- Houle was profiled in the coffee table book Connected Worlds published by BTGroup PLC 2014 ISBN 9780993019609

== Bibliography ==
=== Books ===
- The Shift Age (2007), Booksurge, ISBN 978-1419681783
- The New Health Age: The Future of Healthcare in America (2011) with Jonathan Fleece, Sourcebooks, ISBN 1-402-27393-2
- Shift Ed: A Call to Action for Transforming K-12 Education (2011) with Jeff Cobb, Corwin Press, ISBN 1-412-99296-6
- Entering the Shift Age (2012), Sourcebooks, ISBN 978-1-4022-7217-2
- Is Privacy Dead: The Future of Privacy in the Digital Age 2013, DH&A, ISBN 9781479010127
- Brand Shift: The Future of Brands and Marketing] 2014, DH&A, ISBN 9780990563501
- The Spaceship Earth
- Moving to a Finite Earth Economy - Crew Manual: The Complete Trilogy
- The 2020s: The Most Disruptive Decade in History: Book 1
- The 2020s: A Decade of Cognitive Dissonance
- The 2020s: The Golden Age of Design and Redesign

=== Articles ===
- Houle writes a monthly column in the Business Weekly at the Sarasota Herald-Tribune.
