= Olinto Marella =

Italian Roman Catholic priest

Blessed Olinto Marella
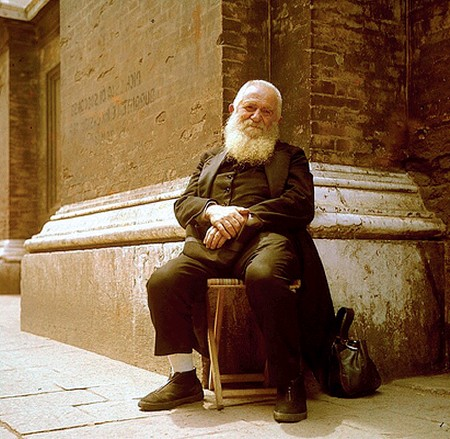

Priest
- Born: 14 June 1882; Pellestrina, Venice, Kingdom of Italy
- Died: 6 September 1969 (aged 87); San Lazzaro di Savena, Bologna, Italy
- Venerated in: Roman Catholic Church
- Beatified: 4 October 2020, Bologna, Italy by Cardinal Matteo Maria Zuppi
- Feast: 6 September
- Attributes: Priest's cassock

Olinto Marella (14 June 1882 – 6 September 1969) was an Italian Roman Catholic priest who exercised his pastoral service in the Archdiocese of Bologna. Marella was a classmate of Pope John XXIII in Rome and the pope held him in high esteem and supported his pastoral initiatives.

He was proclaimed to be Venerable on 27 March 2013 after Pope Francis recognized that he had lived a life of heroic virtue. Pope Francis confirmed a miracle attributed to him on 28 November 2019 and Marella was beatified in Bologna on 4 October 2020.

== Life ==
Olinto Giuseppe Marella was born on 14 June 1882 in Pellestrina as one of three children to Luigi Marella and Carolina de' Bei. His father died when he was at the age of ten in 1892 and his brother Ugo died in 1902. His other brother was Tullio. His uncle – Archbishop Giuseppe Marella – took care of his education.

Marella studied in Rome and was a classmate of Angelo Giuseppe Roncalli – the future Pope John XXIII. Cardinal Aristide Cavallari ordained him to the priesthood on 17 December 1904 and he was assigned to teach in seminaries in Chioggia. He taught humanities and various philosophical and theological studies. In 1909 his pastoral assignments were suspended after he allowed the excommunicated Romolo Murri into his home. He did not protest the decision and accepted it with a humble heart. Cardinal Giovanni Nasalli Rocca di Corneliano later rehabilitated him in 1925.

He worked with the poor and homeless in Bologna and amassed funds for shelters and chapels. Marella would make it his business to sit on a stool on the side of the street and would preach to those who came to him to listen. Some other priests objected to his work as being too evangelical but it did not matter for he had the support of Pope John XXIII who considered Marella to be a "dear friend". Marella also tried to stimulate the innovative principles of Pope Leo XIII and Rerum Novarum. He also knew Gianna Beretta Molla – future saint – and Maria Bolognesi – future Blessed.

Olinto Marella died on 6 September 1969 and hundreds attended his funeral.

== Beatification ==
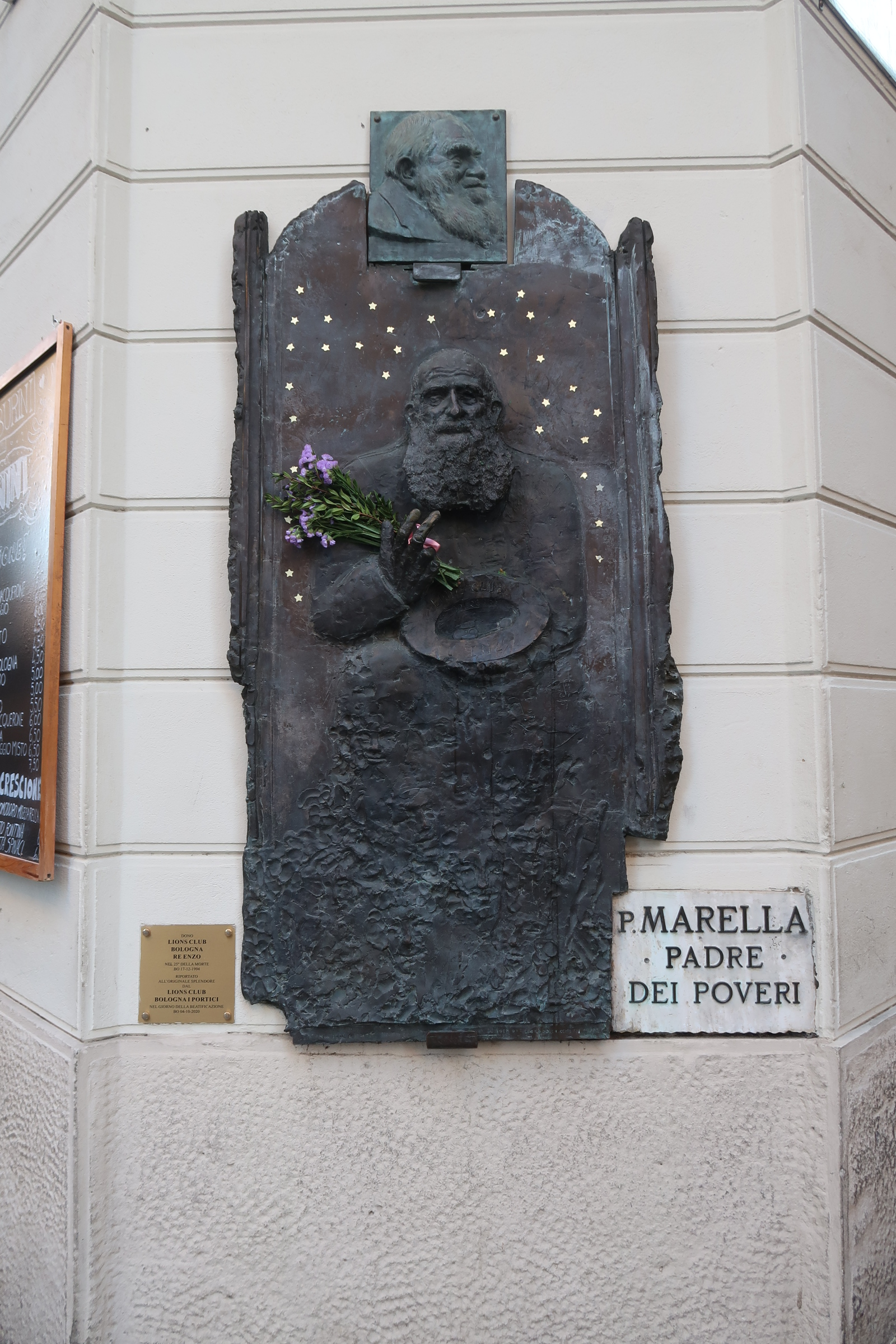
Olinto Marella memorial plaque in Bologna

The introduction of the beatification process was on 20 October 1995 with the declaration of "nihil obstat" (nothing against). The process opened in Bologna and spanned from 8 September 1996 to 17 December 2005; the process was ratified in 2007. Documentation was compiled into what was the Positio – two volumes on his life and his heroic virtue – and was submitted to the Congregation for the Causes of Saints in 2008.

Pope Francis approved his life of heroic virtue and proclaimed him to be Venerable on 27 March 2013.

An alleged miracle attributed to his intercession was investigated and the process was ratified on 30 October 2009. In 2013 the medical board in Rome approved the healing as a miracle and an additional meeting on 10 January 2019 confirmed the healing's miraculous nature. Theologians also confirmed the healing on 4 June 2019. Pope Francis approved the miracle on 28 November 2019 which allowed for Marella to be beatified in Bologna on 4 October 2020; Cardinal Matteo Maria Zuppi presided over the celebration on the pope's behalf.
