= List of Black Clover episodes =

Key visual for the series

Black Clover is a Japanese anime television series based on the manga series Black Clover by Yūki Tabata. Produced by Studio Pierrot and directed by Tatsuya Yoshihara (Note: Episodes 1–152; Credited as chief director from episodes 153–170) and Ayataka Tanemura (Note: Episodes 153–current), the series is set in a world where magic is a common everyday part of people's lives, and is centered around Asta, one of the only known individuals not able to use magic. Asta and his friend, rival, and adoptive brother Yuno, aspire to become the wizard king however to most people it would seem that Asta had no chance of becoming wizard king while Yuno was famous in his village as a prodigy. The first season aired on TV Tokyo and its TXN affiliates from October 3, 2017, to March 30, 2021. Kazuyuki Fudeyasu (Note: Episodes 1–152) and Kanichi Katō (Note: Episodes 153–170) handled series composition, Itsuko Takeda designed the characters, and Minako Seki composed the music. The series uses twenty-six different pieces of theme music: thirteen opening themes and thirteen ending themes.

An original animation DVD based on the manga and produced by Xebec was screened at Jump Festa '16 between November 27 and December 18, 2016. It was bundled with the 11th volume of the manga, which was released on May 2, 2017. A separate original video animation produced by Studio Pierrot was screened at Jump Festa '18.

In 2017, both Crunchyroll and Funimation licensed the series for an English-language release in North America. Crunchyroll simulcasted the series, while Funimation produced an English dub as part of its simuldub program as it aired. Their dubbed adaptation of the first season aired on Adult Swim's Toonami programming block from December 2, 2017, to October 10, 2021. The first DVD and Blu-ray compilation was released by Avex Pictures on February 23, 2018, with individual volumes being released monthly. In February 2021, it was announced that the first season would end on March 30, 2021, which was then followed up by an anime film announcement. The film, titled Black Clover: Sword of the Wizard King, released on June 16, 2023.

In July 2025 at Anime Expo, it was announced that the series would receive a second season, which will also be produced by Studio Pierrot and directed by Ayataka Tanemura. (Note: Despite the first 170 episodes of the series being split into four seasons for its English home media release, the continuation of the series was announced in Japan and by Crunchyroll as a second season. Since then, Crunchyroll has stopped referencing the original division of seasons and instead refers to them as parts of the first season.) It premiered on October 3, 2026.

== Series overview ==
Season	Episodes	Originally released	
Season	Episodes	First released	Last released
1	170	October 3, 2017	March 30, 2021
2	7	October 3, 2026	TBA

== Episodes ==
=== Season 1 (2017–2021) ===
No. overall	No. in season	Title (Note: English translated titles with notes next to them denote alternative titles used by Funimation before its merger into Crunchyroll in April 2024.)	Directed by (Note: Production staff information is taken from the ending credits of each episode.)	Written by (Note: Labelled as "Scenario" (シナリオ))	Chief animation directed by	Original release date	English air date
Magic Knights Entrance Arc
1	1	"Asta and Yuno"; Transliteration: "Asuta to Yuno" (Japanese: アスタとユノ)	Tatsuya Yoshihara	Kazuyuki Fudeyasu	Ikuko Matsushita & Itsuko Takeda	October 3, 2017	December 2, 2017
2	2	"The Boys' Oath" (Note: Funimation's English translation for episode 2 was "A Young Man's Vow"); Transliteration: "Shōnen no Chikai" (Japanese: 少年の誓い)	Tatsuya Yoshihara	Kazuyuki Fudeyasu	Shunji Akasaka & Takaya Sunagawa	October 10, 2017	December 9, 2017
3	3	"To the Royal Capital of the Clover Kingdom!" (Note: Funimation's English translation for episode 3 was "To the Royal Capital!"); Transliteration: "Kurōbā Ōkoku, Ōto e!" (Japanese: クローバー王国、王都へ！)	Directed by : Akira Shimizu; Storyboarded by : Yukihiro Matsushita	Kazuyuki Fudeyasu	Ikuko Matsushita & Mifumi Tomita	October 17, 2017	December 16, 2017
4	4	"The Magic Knights Entrance Exam"; Transliteration: "Mahō Kishidan Nyūdan Shiken" (Japanese: 魔法騎士団入団試験)	Ayataka Tanemura	Kazuyuki Fudeyasu	Takaya Sunagawa & Shunji Akasaka	October 24, 2017	January 6, 2018 (Note: Adult Swim showed a Cowboy Bebop marathon on December 23–24, 2017 and a Dragon Ball Super marathon on December 30–31, 2017)
5	5	"The Path to the Wizard King" (Note: Funimation's English translation for episode 5 was "The Road to the Wizard King"); Transliteration: "Mahōtei e no Michi" (Japanese: 魔法帝への道)	Directed by : Takeyuki Sadohara; Storyboarded by : Yukihiro Matsushita	Kazuyuki Fudeyasu	Chiaki Satō & Itsuko Takeda	October 31, 2017	January 13, 2018
6	6	"The Black Bulls"; Transliteration: "Kuro no Bōgyū" (Japanese: 黒の暴牛)	Directed by : Yūji Tokuno; Storyboarded by : Tasuku Aku	Kazuyuki Fudeyasu	Shunji Akasaka, Takaya Sunagawa & Makoto Shimojima	November 7, 2017	January 20, 2018
7	7	"The Other New Recruit" (Note: Funimation's English translation for episode 7 was "Another New Member"); Transliteration: "Mō Hitori no Shin Nyūdan'in" (Japanese: もう一人の新入団員)	Directed by : Yoshizō Tsuda; Storyboarded by : Yukihiro Matsushita	Kazuyuki Fudeyasu	Kosei Takahashi & Shunji Akasaka	November 14, 2017	January 27, 2018
8	8	"Go! Go! First Mission" (Note: Funimation's English translation for episode 8 was "Go! Go! My First Mission"); Transliteration: "Gō Gō Hatsu Ninmu" (Japanese: ゴーゴー初任務)	Directed by : Shintarō Itoga; Storyboarded by : Kazuo Miyake	Kazuyuki Fudeyasu	Shunji Akasaka & Takaya Sunagawa	November 21, 2017	February 3, 2018
9	9	"Beasts"; Transliteration: "Kemono" (Japanese: 獣(けもの))	Directed by : Rokō Ogiwara; Storyboarded by : Yukihiro Matsushita	Kazuyuki Fudeyasu	Itsuko Takeda	November 28, 2017	February 10, 2018
10	10	"Those Who Protect" (Note: Funimation's English translation for episode 10 was "Guardians"); Transliteration: "Mamoru-mono" (Japanese: 護る者)	Ayataka Tanemura	Kazuyuki Fudeyasu	Kosei Takahashi	December 5, 2017	February 17, 2018
Dungeon Exploration Arc
11	11	"What Happened on a Certain Day in the Castle Town" (Note: Funimation's English translation for episode 11 was "What Happened One Day in the Castle Town"); Transliteration: "Toaru Hi no Jōkamachi de no Dekigoto" (Japanese: とある日の城下町での出来事)	Directed by : Yoshito Hata; Storyboarded by : Yukihiro Matsushita	Kazuyuki Fudeyasu	Shunji Akasaka, Takaya Sunagawa & Itsuko Takeda	December 12, 2017	February 24, 2018
12	12	"The Wizard King Saw"; Transliteration: "Mahōtei wa Mita" (Japanese: 魔法帝は見た)	Directed by : Takashi Asami; Storyboarded by : Yukihiro Matsushita	Kazuyuki Fudeyasu	Makoto Shimojima	December 19, 2017	March 3, 2018
13	13	"The Wizard King Saw, Continued"; Transliteration: "Zoku Mahōtei wa Mita" (Japanese: 続・魔法帝は見た)	Directed by : Matsuo Asami; Storyboarded by : Kazuo Miyake	Kazuyuki Fudeyasu	Itsuko Takeda & Kosei Takahashi	December 26, 2017	March 10, 2018
14	14	"Dungeon"; Transliteration: "Danjon" (Japanese: 魔宮(ダンジョン))	Directed by : Yoshizō Tsuda; Storyboarded by : Yasuyuki Honda	Kazuyuki Fudeyasu	Kosei Takahashi & Shunji Akasaka	January 9, 2018	March 17, 2018
15	15	"The Diamond Mage"; Transliteration: "Daiyamondo no Madōsenshi" (Japanese: ダイヤモンドの魔導戦士)	Directed by : Rokō Ogiwara; Storyboarded by : Yukihiro Matsushita	Kazuyuki Fudeyasu	Makoto Shimojima & Itsuko Takeda	January 16, 2018	March 24, 2018
16	16	"Friends"; Transliteration: "Nakama" (Japanese: 仲間)	Directed by : Daisuke Chiba; Storyboarded by : Hirotsugu Kawasaki	Kazuyuki Fudeyasu	Takaya Sunagawa & Shunji Akasaka	January 23, 2018	March 31, 2018
17	17	"Destroyer"; Transliteration: "Hakaimono" (Japanese: 破壊者)	Tatsuya Yoshihara	Kazuyuki Fudeyasu	Itsuko Takeda	January 30, 2018	April 8, 2018 (Note: Due to special scheduling, Black Clover moved down to 1:00 a.m. EDT/PDT beginning on the night of April 7–8, 2018, which is effectively Sunday)
18	18	"Memories of You"; Transliteration: "Tsuioku no Kimi" (Japanese: 追憶の君)	Directed by : Kenichi Maejima; Storyboarded by : Yūzō Satō	Kazuyuki Fudeyasu	Takaya Sunagawa & Shunji Akasaka	February 6, 2018	April 15, 2018
19	19	"Destruction and Salvation"; Transliteration: "Hōkai to Kyūsai" (Japanese: 崩壊と救済)	Directed by : Yūji Tokuno; Storyboarded by : Kazuo Miyake	Kazuyuki Fudeyasu	Kosei Takahashi	February 13, 2018	April 22, 2018
Eye of the Midnight Sun: Royal Capital Invasion Arc
20	20	"Assembly at the Royal Capital"; Transliteration: "Ōto Shūketsu" (Japanese: 王都集結)	Directed by : Matsuo Asami; Storyboarded by : Yukihiro Matsushita	Kazuyuki Fudeyasu	Takaya Sunagawa & Shunji Akasaka	February 20, 2018	April 29, 2018
21	21	"Capital Riot"; Transliteration: "Ōto Sōran" (Japanese: 王都騒乱)	Ayataka Tanemura	Kazuyuki Fudeyasu	Kosei Takahashi	February 27, 2018	May 6, 2018 (Note: Black Clover moved a half-hour (to 1:30 a.m. EDT/PDT, switching time slots with Hunter × Hunter) on the night of May 5–6, 2018)
22	22	"Wild Magic Dance"; Transliteration: "Mahō Ranbu" (Japanese: 魔法乱舞)	Directed by : Rokō Ogiwara; Storyboarded by : Yukihiro Matsushita	Kazuyuki Fudeyasu	Takaya Sunagawa & Shunji Akasaka	March 6, 2018	May 13, 2018
23	23	"The Crimson Lion King" (Note: Funimation's English translation for episode 23 was "The King of the Crimson Lions"); Transliteration: "Guren no Shishiō" (Japanese: 紅蓮の獅子王)	Directed by : Yoshizō Tsuda; Storyboarded by : Kazuo Miyake	Kazuyuki Fudeyasu	Itsuko Takeda & Ikuko Matsushita	March 13, 2018	May 20, 2018
24	24	"Blackout"; Transliteration: "Burakkuauto" (Japanese: ブラックアウト)	Directed by : Daisuke Chiba & Seiji Morita; Storyboarded by : Hirotsugu Kawasaki	Kazuyuki Fudeyasu	Takaya Sunagawa & Shunji Akasaka	March 20, 2018	June 3, 2018 (Note: Adult Swim showed a FLCL marathon on May 26–27, 2018)
25	25	"Adversity"; Transliteration: "Gyakkyō" (Japanese: 逆境)	Directed by : Akira Shimizu; Storyboarded by : Shigehisa Iida	Kazuyuki Fudeyasu	Ikuko Matsushita & Kosei Takahashi	March 27, 2018	June 10, 2018
26	26	"Wounded Beasts"; Transliteration: "Teoi no Kemono" (Japanese: 手負いの獣)	Directed by : Matsuo Asami; Storyboarded by : Kazuo Miyake	Kazuyuki Fudeyasu	Takaya Sunagawa & Shunji Akasaka	April 3, 2018	June 17, 2018
27	27	"Light"; Transliteration: "Hikari" (Japanese: 光)	Directed by : Tazumi Mukaiyama; Storyboarded by : Kazuo Miyake	Kazuyuki Fudeyasu	Itsuko Takeda	April 10, 2018	June 24, 2018
Eye of the Midnight Sun: Encounter Arc
28	28	"The One I've Set My Heart On"; Transliteration: "Kokoro ni Kimeta Hito" (Japanese: 心に決めた人)	Ayataka Tanemura	Kazuyuki Fudeyasu	Kosei Takahashi	April 17, 2018	July 1, 2018
29	29	"Path"; Transliteration: "Michi" (Japanese: 道)	Directed by : Yūji Tokuno; Storyboarded by : Tatsuya Yoshihara	Kazuyuki Fudeyasu	Takaya Sunagawa & Shunji Akasaka	April 24, 2018	July 8, 2018
30	30	"The Mirror Mage"; Transliteration: "Kagami no Madōshi" (Japanese: 鏡の魔道士)	Directed by : Kenta Katase; Storyboarded by : Shigehisa Iida	Kanichi Katō	Itsuko Takeda & Ikuko Matsushita	May 1, 2018	July 15, 2018
31	31	"Pursuit Over the Snow"; Transliteration: "Setsujō no Tsuigeki" (Japanese: 雪上の追跡)	Directed by : Yoshizō Tsuda; Storyboarded by : Yukihiro Matsushita	Kanichi Katō	Sayuri Sakimoto	May 8, 2018	July 22, 2018
32	32	"Three-Leaf Sprouts"; Transliteration: "Mitsuba no Me" (Japanese: 三つ葉の芽)	Directed by : Toshihiro Maeya; Storyboarded by : Kazuo Miyake	Kanichi Katō	Takaya Sunagawa & Shunji Akasaka	May 15, 2018	July 29, 2018
33	33	"To Help Somebody Someday"; Transliteration: "Itsuka Dareka no Tame ni naru" (Japanese: いつか誰かの為になる)	Directed by : Matsuo Asami; Storyboarded by : Toshihiko Masuda	Kanichi Katō	Sayuri Sakimoto	May 22, 2018	August 5, 2018
34	34	"Light Magic vs. Dark Magic"; Transliteration: "Hikari Mahō Bāsasu Yami Mahō" (Japanese: 光魔法VS闇魔法)	Directed by : Daisuke Chiba; Storyboarded by : Taisuke Mori	Kanichi Katō	Takaya Sunagawa & Shunji Akasaka	May 29, 2018	August 12, 2018
35	35	"The Light of Judgment"; Transliteration: "Sabaki no Hikari" (Japanese: 裁きの光)	Directed by : Akira Shimizu; Storyboarded by : Hirotsugu Kawasaki	Kanichi Katō	Sayuri Sakimoto	June 5, 2018	August 19, 2018
36	36	"Three Eyes"; Transliteration: "Mittsu no Me" (Japanese: 三つの眼)	Ayataka Tanemura	Kazuyuki Fudeyasu	Kosei Takahashi	June 12, 2018	August 26, 2018
37	37	"The One With No Magic"; Transliteration: "Maryokunaki Mono" (Japanese: 魔力無き者)	Directed by : Yoshihiro Sugai; Storyboarded by : Yukihiro Matsushita	Kazuyuki Fudeyasu	Itsuko Takeda & Sayuri Sakimoto	June 19, 2018	September 9, 2018 (Note: Adult Swim showed a My Hero Academia marathon on September 1–2, 2018)
Seabed Temple Arc
38	38	"The Magic Knights Captain Conference"; Transliteration: "Mahō Kishi-dan Danchō Kaigi" (Japanese: 魔法騎士団団長会議)	Directed by : Tazumi Mukaiyama; Storyboarded by : Kazuo Miyake	Kanichi Katō	Takaya Sunagawa & Shunji Akasaka	June 26, 2018	September 16, 2018
39	39	"Three-Leaf Salute"; Transliteration: "Mitsuba no Keirei" (Japanese: 三つ葉の敬礼)	Directed by : Yoshizō Tsuda; Storyboarded by : Jun Kamiya	Kanichi Katō	Sayuri Sakimoto	July 3, 2018	September 23, 2018
40	40	"A Black Beach Story"; Transliteration: "Kuro no Kaigan Monogatari" (Japanese: 黒の海岸物語)	Directed by : Shigeki Awai; Storyboarded by : Taisuke Mori	Kazuyuki Fudeyasu	Kosei Takahashi	July 10, 2018	September 30, 2018
41	41	"The Water Girl Grows Up"; Transliteration: "Mizu no Ko Seichō Monogatari" (Japanese: 水の娘成長物語)	Directed by : Toshihiro Maeya; Storyboarded by : Yukihiro Matsushita	Kazuyuki Fudeyasu	Sayuri Sakimoto	July 17, 2018	October 7, 2018
42	42	"The Underwater Temple"; Transliteration: "Kaitei Shinden" (Japanese: 海底神殿)	Directed by : Matsuo Asami; Storyboarded by : Jun Kamiya	Kanichi Katō	Takaya Sunagawa & Shunji Akasaka	July 24, 2018	October 14, 2018
43	43	"Temple Battle Royale"; Transliteration: "Shinden Batoru Rowaiyaru" (Japanese: 神殿バトルロワイヤル)	Ayataka Tanemura	Kanichi Katō	Kosei Takahashi	July 31, 2018	October 21, 2018
44	44	"The Pointlessly Direct Fireball and the Wild Lightning"; Transliteration: "Guchokuna Kakyū to Honpōna Inazuma" (Japanese: 愚直な火球と奔放な稲光)	Directed by : Akira Shimizu; Storyboarded by : Hirotsugu Kawasaki	Kazuyuki Fudeyasu	Sayuri Sakimoto	August 7, 2018	October 28, 2018
45	45	"The Guy Who Doesn't Know When to Quit"; Transliteration: "Akirame no Warui Otoko" (Japanese: 諦めの悪い男)	Directed by : Seung Deok Kim; Storyboarded by : Kazuo Miyake	Kanichi Katō	Sayuri Sakimoto	August 14, 2018	November 4, 2018
46	46	"Awakening"; Transliteration: "Kakusei" (Japanese: 覚醒)	Directed by : Yoshizō Tsuda; Storyboarded by : Shigehisa Iida	Kazuyuki Fudeyasu	Kosei Takahashi	August 21, 2018	November 11, 2018
47	47	"The Only Weapon"; Transliteration: "Yuiitsu no Buki" (Japanese: 唯一の武器)	Directed by : Tazumi Mukaiyama; Storyboarded by : Yukihiro Matsushita	Kazuyuki Fudeyasu	Itsuko Takeda & Sayuri Sakimoto	August 28, 2018	November 25, 2018 (Note: Adult Swim showed an Attack on Titan marathon on November 17–18, 2018)
48	48	"Despair vs. Hope"; Transliteration: "Zetsubō Bāsasu Kibō" (Japanese: 絶望VS希望)	Directed by : Daisuke Chiba; Storyboarded by : Jun Kamiya	Kanichi Katō	N/A	September 4, 2018	December 2, 2018
49	49	"Beyond Limits"; Transliteration: "Genkai no Saki" (Japanese: 限界の先)	Directed by : Toshihiro Maeya; Storyboarded by : Hirotsugu Kawasaki & Tatsuya Yoshihara	Kanichi Katō	Takaya Sunagawa & Shunji Akasaka	September 11, 2018	December 9, 2018
50	50	"End of the Battle, End of Despair"; Transliteration: "Tatakai no Hate - Zetsubō no Owari" (Japanese: 戦いの果て 絶望の終わり)	Directed by : Matsuo Asami; Storyboarded by : Masayuki Takahashi	Kazuyuki Fudeyasu	Sayuri Sakimoto	September 18, 2018	December 16, 2018
Witches' Forest Arc
51	51	"Proof of Rightness"; Transliteration: "Tadashi-sa no Shōmei" (Japanese: 正しさの証明)	Directed by : Yūsuke Onoda & Yoshihiro Sugai; Storyboarded by : Yukihiro Matsushita	Kazuyuki Fudeyasu	N/A	September 25, 2018	January 6, 2019 (Note: Adult Swim showed a Dragon Ball Super marathon on December 22–23, 2018 and a Boruto: Naruto Next Generations marathon on December 29–30, 2018)
52	52	"Whoever's Strongest Wins"; Transliteration: "Tsuyoi Hōga Katsu" (Japanese: 強い方が勝つ)	Directed by : Tenpei Mishio; Storyboarded by : Yukihiro Matsushita & Masayuki Takahashi	Momoko Murakami	Takaya Sunagawa & Shunji Akasaka	October 2, 2018	January 13, 2019
53	53	"Behind the Mask"; Transliteration: "Kamen no Oku" (Japanese: 仮面の奥)	Directed by : Yoshizō Tsuda; Storyboarded by : Ichizō Kobayashi	Kazuyuki Fudeyasu	Itsuko Takeda & Sayuri Sakimoto	October 9, 2018	January 20, 2019
54	54	"Never Again"; Transliteration: "Mōnidoto" (Japanese: もう二度と)	Ayataka Tanemura	Momoko Murakami	Kosei Takahashi	October 16, 2018	January 27, 2019
55	55	"The Man Named Fanzell"; Transliteration: "Fanzeru to Yū otoko" (Japanese: ファンゼルという男)	Directed by : Daisuke Chiba & Shigeki Awai; Storyboarded by : Sōichi Shimada	Kazuyuki Fudeyasu	Sayuri Sakimoto	October 23, 2018	February 3, 2019
56	56	"The Man Named Fanzell, Continued"; Transliteration: "Zoku Fanzeru to Yū otoko" (Japanese: 続・ファンゼルという男)	Directed by : Tazumi Mukaiyama; Storyboarded by : Amenoichi	Kanichi Katō	Itsuko Takeda & Sayuri Sakimoto	October 30, 2018	February 10, 2019
57	57	"Infiltration"; Transliteration: "Sen'nyū" (Japanese: 潜入)	Directed by : Toshihiro Maeya; Storyboarded by : Masayuki Takahashi	Kanichi Katō	Itsuko Takeda & Sayuri Sakimoto	November 6, 2018	February 17, 2019
58	58	"Battlefield Decision"; Transliteration: "Senjō no Ketsudan" (Japanese: 戦場の決断)	Directed by : Matsuo Asami; Storyboarded by : Yukihiro Matsushita	Kanichi Katō	Sayuri Sakimoto	November 13, 2018	February 24, 2019
59	59	"Flames of Hatred"; Transliteration: "Zōo no Honō" (Japanese: 憎悪の炎)	Directed by : Rokō Ogiwara; Storyboarded by : Sōichi Shimada	Momoko Murakami	Shirō Shibata	November 20, 2018	March 3, 2019
60	60	"Defectors' Atonement"; Transliteration: "Rihan-sha no Shokuzai" (Japanese: 離反者の贖罪)	Directed by : Akira Shimizu; Storyboarded by : Amenoichi	Momoko Murakami	Itsuko Takeda, Sayuri Sakimoto & Hirokimi Shiratori	November 27, 2018	March 10, 2019
61	61	"The Promised World"; Transliteration: "Yakusoku no Sekai" (Japanese: 約束の世界)	Ayataka Tanemura	Kazuyuki Fudeyasu	Kosei Takahashi	December 4, 2018	March 17, 2019
62	62	"Those Who Boost Each Other Up" (Note: Funimation's English translation for episode 62 was "Bettering One Another"); Transliteration: "Takame Au Sonzai" (Japanese: 高め合う存在)	Directed by : Yoshizō Tsuda; Storyboarded by : Yukihiro Matsushita	Momoko Murakami	Sayuri Sakimoto	December 11, 2018	March 24, 2019
63	63	"Not in the Slightest"; Transliteration: "Nandemonai" (Japanese: 何でも無い)	Tatsuya Yoshihara	Momoko Murakami	Itsuko Takeda & Shirō Shibata	December 18, 2018	March 31, 2019
64	64	"The Red Thread of Fate"; Transliteration: "Unmei no Akai Ito" (Japanese: 運命の赤い糸)	Directed by : Fumio Maezono; Storyboarded by : Amenoichi	Kazuyuki Fudeyasu	Hirokimi Shiratori	December 25, 2018	April 7, 2019
65	65	"I'm Home"; Transliteration: "Tadaima" (Japanese: ただいま)	Directed by : Toshihiro Maeya; Storyboarded by : Yukihiro Matsushita	Momoko Murakami	Sayuri Sakimoto	January 8, 2019	April 14, 2019
Royal Knights Arc
66	66	"The Eye of the Midnight Sun's Secret" (Note: Funimation's English translation for episode 66 was "The Secret of the Eye of the Midnight Sun"); Transliteration: "Byakuya no Magan no Himitsu" (Japanese: 白夜の魔眼のひみつ)	Directed by : Tazumi Mukaiyama; Storyboarded by : Ayataka Tanemura	Kazuyuki Fudeyasu	Sayuri Sakimoto & Itsuko Takeda	January 15, 2019	April 21, 2019
67	67	"A Fun Festival Double Date"; Transliteration: "Tanoshī o Matsuri Daburu Dēto" (Japanese: 楽しいお祭りW(ダブル)デート)	Shigehisa Iida	Kanichi Katō	Shirō Shibata	January 22, 2019	April 28, 2019
68	68	"Battle to the Death?! Yami vs. Jack"; Transliteration: "Shitō!? Yami Bāsasu Jakku" (Japanese: 死闘!? ヤミVSジャック)	Directed by : Shigeki Awai; Storyboarded by : Amenoichi	Kazuyuki Fudeyasu	Sayuri Sakimoto	January 29, 2019	May 5, 2019
69	69	"The Briar Maiden's Melancholy"; Transliteration: "Ibara Otome no Yūutsu" (Japanese: 荊乙女の憂鬱)	Ayataka Tanemura	Momoko Murakami	Kosei Takahashi	February 5, 2019	May 12, 2019
70	70	"Two New Stars"; Transliteration: "Futatsu no Shinsei" (Japanese: 二つの新星)	Directed by : Yoshizō Tsuda; Storyboarded by : Taisuke Mori	Kanichi Katō	Sayuri Sakimoto	February 12, 2019	May 19, 2019
71	71	"The Uncrowned, Undefeated Lioness"; Transliteration: "Mukan Muhai no Onna Shishi" (Japanese: 無冠無敗の女獅子)	Directed by : Fumio Maezono; Storyboarded by : Jun Kamiya	Momoko Murakami	Hirokimi Shiratori	February 19, 2019	May 26, 2019
72	72	"Saint Elmo's Fire"; Transliteration: "Sento Erumo no Hi" (Japanese: セントエルモの火)	Directed by : Tazumi Mukaiyama; Storyboarded by : Hirotsugu Kawasaki	Kanichi Katō	Takaya Sunagawa & Shunji Akasaka	February 26, 2019	June 2, 2019
73	73	"The Royal Knights Selection Test"; Transliteration: "Roiyaru Naitsu Senbatsu Shiken" (Japanese: 王撰騎士団(ロイヤルナイツ)選抜試験)	Directed by : Akira Shimizu; Storyboarded by : Yukihiro Matsushita	Momoko Murakami	Sayuri Sakimoto & Itsuko Takeda	March 5, 2019	June 9, 2019
74	74	"Flower of Resolution"; Transliteration: "Chikai no Hana" (Japanese: 誓いの花)	Directed by : Mihiro Yamaguchi; Storyboarded by : Masayuki Takahashi	Momoko Murakami	Hirokimi Shiratori	March 12, 2019	June 16, 2019
75	75	"Fierce Battle"; Transliteration: "Gekisen" (Japanese: 激戦)	Directed by : Shigeki Awai; Storyboarded by : Ichizō Kobayashi	Kanichi Katō	Sayuri Sakimoto	March 19, 2019	June 23, 2019
76	76	"Mage X"; Transliteration: "Madō-shi Ekkusu" (Japanese: 魔道士X(エックス))	Directed by : Rokō Ogiwara; Storyboarded by : Taisuke Mori	Kazuyuki Fudeyasu	Takaya Sunagawa & Shunji Akasaka	March 26, 2019	June 30, 2019
77	77	"Bad Blood"; Transliteration: "In'nen" (Japanese: 因縁)	Directed by : Akihiro Nagao; Storyboarded by : Yukihiro Matsushita	Momoko Murakami	Ai Nakatani	April 2, 2019	July 7, 2019
78	78	"Peasant Trap"; Transliteration: "Gemin no Wana" (Japanese: 下民の罠)	Directed by : Fumio Maezono; Storyboarded by : Masayuki Takahashi	Momoko Murakami	Hirokimi Shiratori	April 9, 2019	July 14, 2019
79	79	"Mister Delinquent vs. Muscle Brains"; Transliteration: "Yankī Senpai Bāsasu Kin'niku Baka" (Japanese: ヤンキー先輩VS筋肉バカ)	Directed by : Matsuo Asami; Storyboarded by : Yukihiro Matsushita	Momoko Murakami	Sayuri Sakimoto & Ai Nakatani	April 16, 2019	July 21, 2019
80	80	"Special Little Brother vs. Failed Big Brother"; Transliteration: "Yūtōsei no Otōto Bāsasu Fudeki no Ani" (Japanese: 優等生の弟VS不出来の兄)	Ayataka Tanemura	Kanichi Katō	Kosei Takahashi	April 23, 2019	July 28, 2019
81	81	"The Life of a Certain Man"; Transliteration: "Aru Hitori no Otoko no Ikikata" (Japanese: ある一人の男の生き方)	Directed by : Akira Shimizu; Storyboarded by : Shigehisa Iida	Kazuyuki Fudeyasu	Hirokimi Shiratori	April 30, 2019	August 4, 2019
82	82	"Petit Clover! The Nightmarish Charmy SP!" (Note: Funimation's English translation for episode 82 was "Clover Clips: The Nightmarish Charmy Special!"); Transliteration: "Puchitto Kurōbā! Akumu no Chāmī Supesharu!" (Japanese: プチット・クローバー!悪夢のチャーミーSP(スペシャル)!)	Rokō Ogiwara	Kazuyuki Fudeyasu	N/A	May 7, 2019	August 11, 2019
83	83	"Burn It Into You"; Transliteration: "Ima, Yakitsukeru" (Japanese: 今、焼き付ける)	Directed by : Tazumi Mukaiyama; Storyboarded by : Yukihiro Matsushita	Momoko Murakami	Hirokimi Shiratori & Ai Nakatani	May 14, 2019	August 18, 2019
84	84	"The Victors"; Transliteration: "Shōsha" (Japanese: 勝者)	Directed by : Tatsuya Yoshihara & Yoshino Miwa; Storyboarded by : Tatsuya Yoshihara	Kanichi Katō	Takaya Sunagawa & Shunji Akasaka	May 21, 2019	August 25, 2019
Eye of the Midnight Sun: Subjugation Arc
85	85	"Together in the Bath"; Transliteration: "Hadaka no Tsukiai" (Japanese: 裸の付き合い)	Directed by : Akihiro Nagao; Storyboarded by : Masayuki Takahashi	Kazuyuki Fudeyasu	Sayuri Sakimoto	May 28, 2019	September 1, 2019
86	86	"Yami and Vangeance"; Transliteration: "Yami to Vanjansu" (Japanese: ヤミとヴァンジャンス)	Directed by : Masahiro Okamura; Storyboarded by : Shigehisa Iida	Kazuyuki Fudeyasu	Sayuri Sakimoto	June 4, 2019	September 8, 2019
87	87	"Formation of the Royal Knights"; Transliteration: "Roiyaru Naitsu Kessei" (Japanese: 王撰騎士団(ロイヤルナイツ)結成)	Directed by : Rokō Ogiwara; Storyboarded by : Yukihiro Matsushita	Kanichi Katō	Takaya Sunagawa & Shunji Akasaka	June 11, 2019	September 15, 2019
88	88	"Storming the Eye of the Midnight Sun's Hideout!!!"; Transliteration: "Byakuya no Magan Ajito - Totsunyū!!!" (Japanese: 白夜の魔眼アジト 突入!!!)	Directed by : Fumio Maezono; Storyboarded by : Taisuke Mori	Kanichi Katō	Hirokimi Shiratori	June 18, 2019	September 22, 2019
89	89	"The Black Bulls' Hideout"; Transliteration: "Kuro no Bōgyū Ajito" (Japanese: 黒の暴牛アジト)	Directed by : Yoshizō Tsuda; Storyboarded by : Shigehisa Iida	Kazuyuki Fudeyasu	Sayuri Sakimoto & Itsuko Takeda	June 25, 2019	October 6, 2019 (Note: Adult Swim showed a Dragon Ball Super marathon on September 28–29, 2019)
90	90	"Crazy Magic Battle"; Transliteration: "Muchakucha na Mahōsen" (Japanese: ムチャクチャな魔法戦)	Directed by : Ryōhei Horiuchi; Storyboarded by : Shinji Ishihira	Kazuyuki Fudeyasu	Sayuri Sakimoto & Itsuko Takeda	July 2, 2019	October 13, 2019
91	91	"Mereoleona vs. Raia the Disloyal" (Note: Funimation's English translation for episode 91 was "Mereoleona vs. Rhya the Disloyal"); Transliteration: "Mereoreona Bāsasu Fujitsu no Raia" (Japanese: メレオレオナVS不実のライア)	Ayataka Tanemura	Kazuyuki Fudeyasu	Kosei Takahashi	July 9, 2019	October 20, 2019
92	92	"The Wizard King vs. the Leader of the Eye of the Midnight Sun"; Transliteration: "Mahōtei Bāsasu Byakuya no Magan Tōshu" (Japanese: 魔法帝VS白夜の魔眼頭首)	Directed by : Akira Shimizu; Storyboarded by : Yukihiro Matsushita	Kanichi Katō	Hirokimi Shiratori	July 16, 2019	October 27, 2019
93	93	"Julius Novachrono"; Transliteration: "Yuriusu Novakurono" (Japanese: ユリウス・ノヴァクロノ)	Directed by : Rokō Ogiwara; Storyboarded by : Tatsuya Yoshihara	Kanichi Katō	Takaya Sunagawa & Shunji Akasaka	July 23, 2019	November 3, 2019
94	94	"New Future"; Transliteration: "Atarashii Mirai" (Japanese: 新しい未来)	Directed by : Tazumi Mukaiyama; Storyboarded by : Yukihiro Matsushita	Kanichi Katō	Ai Nakatani, Sayuri Sakimoto & Itsuko Takeda	July 30, 2019	November 10, 2019
Elf Reincarnation Arc
95	95	"Reincarnation"; Transliteration: "Tensei" (Japanese: 転生)	Directed by : Fumio Maezono; Storyboarded by : Shigehisa Iida	Kazuyuki Fudeyasu	Hirokimi Shiratori	August 6, 2019	November 17, 2019
96	96	"The Black Bulls Captain vs. the Crimson Wild Rose"; Transliteration: "Kuro no Bōgyū Danchō Bāsasu Shinku no Nobara" (Japanese: 黒の暴牛団長VS真紅の野薔薇)	Directed by : Ryōhei Horiuchi; Storyboarded by : Yukihiro Matsushita	Kazuyuki Fudeyasu	Hirokimi Shiratori & Kosei Takahashi	August 13, 2019	November 24, 2019
97	97	"Overwhelming Disadvantage"; Transliteration: "Attō-teki Ressei" (Japanese: 圧倒的劣勢)	Directed by : Kōji Sasaki; Storyboarded by : Hirotsugu Kawasaki	Kazuyuki Fudeyasu	Hirokimi Shiratori & Hiroshi Numata	August 20, 2019	December 8, 2019 (Note: Adult Swim showed a Food Wars!: Shokugeki no Soma marathon on November 30–December 1, 2019, exempting everything but My Hero Academia and One-Punch Man)
98	98	"The Sleeping Lion"; Transliteration: "Nemureru Shishi" (Japanese: 眠れる獅子)	Directed by : Yoshizō Tsuda; Storyboarded by : Shinji Ishihira	Kazuyuki Fudeyasu	Hirokimi Shiratori, Itsuko Takeda & Hiroshi Numata	August 27, 2019	December 15, 2019
99	99	"The Desperate Path Toward Survival"; Transliteration: "Inochigake no Ikiru Michi" (Japanese: 命懸けの生きる道)	Directed by : Fumio Maezono; Storyboarded by : Masayuki Takahashi	Kazuyuki Fudeyasu	Hirokimi Shiratori	September 3, 2019	January 5, 2020 (Note: Adult Swim showed a One-Punch Man marathon on December 21–22, 2019 and a Dr. Stone marathon on December 28–29, 2019)
100	100	"We Won't Lose to You"; Transliteration: "Omaeni wa Makenai" (Japanese: オマエには負けない)	Directed by : Toshihiro Maeya & Tatsuya Yoshihara; Storyboarded by : Taisuke Mori & Tatsuya Yoshihara	Kazuyuki Fudeyasu	Takaya Sunagawa & Shunji Akasaka	September 10, 2019	January 12, 2020
101	101	"The Lives of the Village in the Sticks"; Transliteration: "Saihate no Mura no Inochi" (Japanese: 最果ての村の命)	Ayataka Tanemura	Kazuyuki Fudeyasu	Kosei Takahashi	September 17, 2019	January 19, 2020
102	102	"Two Miracles"; Transliteration: "Futatsu no Kiseki" (Japanese: 2つのキセキ)	Directed by : Rokō Ogiwara; Storyboarded by : Tatsuya Yoshihara	Kanichi Katō	Itsuko Takeda & Hirokimi Shiratori	September 24, 2019	January 26, 2020
103	103	"Release from Misfortune"; Transliteration: "Inga Kaihō" (Japanese: 因果解放)	Directed by : Toshihiro Maeya; Storyboarded by : Yukihiro Matsushita	Kanichi Katō	Keizō Shimizu	October 1, 2019	February 2, 2020
104	104	"Lightning of Rage vs. Friends"; Transliteration: "Ikari no Ikazuchi Bāsasu Nakama" (Japanese: 怒りの雷VS仲間)	Shigehisa Iida	Kazuyuki Fudeyasu	Hiroshi Numata	October 8, 2019	February 9, 2020
105	105	"Smiles, Tears"; Transliteration: "Egao Namida" (Japanese: 笑顔 涙)	Directed by : Fumio Maezono; Storyboarded by : Yukihiro Matsushita	Kazuyuki Fudeyasu	Hirokimi Shiratori & Itsuko Takeda	October 15, 2019	February 16, 2020
106	106	"Path of Revenge, Path of Atonement"; Transliteration: "Fukushū no Michi Tsugunai no Michi" (Japanese: 復讐の道 償いの道)	Directed by : Shigeki Awai; Storyboarded by : Shinji Ishihira	Kazuyuki Fudeyasu	Hiroshi Numata	October 22, 2019	February 23, 2020
107	107	"The Battle for Clover Castle"; Transliteration: "Kessen Kurōbā-jō" (Japanese: 決戦 クローバー城)	Directed by : Matsuo Asami; Storyboarded by : Yukihiro Matsushita	Jun Kamiya	Hiroshi Numata & Itsuko Takeda	October 29, 2019	March 1, 2020
108	108	"Battlefield Dancer"; Transliteration: "Senjō no Maihime" (Japanese: 戦場の舞姫)	Ayataka Tanemura	Jun Kamiya	Kosei Takahashi	November 5, 2019	March 8, 2020
109	109	"Spatial Mage Brothers"; Transliteration: "Kūkan Madōshi no Kyōdai" (Japanese: 空間魔導士の兄弟)	Directed by : Rokō Ogiwara; Storyboarded by : Masayuki Takahashi	Kanichi Katō	Yoon-Joung Kim	November 12, 2019	March 15, 2020
110	110	"The Raging Bull Joins the Showdown!!"; Transliteration: "Abare Ushi Chōjō Kessen Sansen!!" (Japanese: 暴れ牛 頂上決戦参戦!!)	Directed by : Fumio Maezono; Storyboarded by : Shinji Ishihira	Kanichi Katō	Hirokimi Shiratori	November 19, 2019	March 22, 2020
111	111	"The Eyes in the Mirror"; Transliteration: "Kagami no Naka no Hitomi" (Japanese: 鏡の中の瞳)	Directed by : Tsurumi Mukoyama; Storyboarded by : Tsurumi Mukoyama & Masayuki Takahashi	Kanichi Katō	Hiroshi Numata	November 26, 2019	March 29, 2020
112	112	"Humans Who Can Be Trusted"; Transliteration: "Shinjirareru Ningen" (Japanese: 信じられる人間)	Directed by : Ryōhei Horiuchi; Storyboarded by : Yukihiro Matsushita	Kanichi Katō	Hiroshi Numata	December 3, 2019	April 5, 2020
Shadow Palace Arc
113	113	"Storming the Shadow Palace"; Transliteration: "Totsunyū Kage no Ōkyū" (Japanese: 突入 影の王宮)	Directed by : Shigehisa Iida; Storyboarded by : Shinji Ishihira & Shigehisa Iida	Kazuyuki Fudeyasu	Hirokimi Shiratori & Hiroshi Numata	December 10, 2019	April 19, 2020 (Note: Adult Swim showed a Dragon Ball Z Kai marathon on April 11–12, 2020)
114	114	"The Final Invaders"; Transliteration: "Saigo no Nyūjō-sha" (Japanese: 最後の入城者)	Directed by : Akira Shimizu; Storyboarded by : Masayuki Takahashi & Shinji Ishihira	Kazuyuki Fudeyasu	Keizō Shimizu	December 17, 2019	April 26, 2020
115	115	"Mastermind"; Transliteration: "Kuromaku" (Japanese: 黒幕)	Directed by : Rokō Ogiwara; Storyboarded by : Taisuke Mori	Jun Kamiya	Yoon-Joung Kim & Hiroshi Numata	December 24, 2019	May 3, 2020
116	116	"The Ultimate Natural Enemy"; Transliteration: "Saikyō no Tenteki" (Japanese: 最強の天敵)	Directed by : Fumio Maezono; Storyboarded by : Tsurumi Mukoyama, Yoshihiro Sugai & Yūsuke Onoda	Jun Kamiya	Hirokimi Shiratori	January 7, 2020	May 10, 2020
117	117	"Breaking the Seal"; Transliteration: "Ima Fū o Kiru Toki" (Japanese: 今封を切る時)	Directed by : Yoshihisa Matsumoto; Storyboarded by : Takashi Iida	Jun Kamiya	Hiroshi Numata	January 14, 2020	May 17, 2020
118	118	"A Reunion Across Time and Space"; Transliteration: "Jikū o Koeta Saikai" (Japanese: 時空を超えた再会)	Isuta & Ayataka Tanemura	Kanichi Katō	Kosei Takahashi	January 21, 2020	May 24, 2020
119	119	"The Final Attack"; Transliteration: "Owari no Ichigeki" (Japanese: 終わりの一撃)	Directed by : Rokō Ogiwara; Storyboarded by : Taisuke Mori, Ayataka Tanemura & Tatsuya Yoshihara	Kazuyuki Fudeyasu	Hiroshi Numata	January 28, 2020	May 31, 2020
120	120	"Dawn"; Transliteration: "Yoake" (Japanese: 夜明け)	Directed by : Toshihiro Maeya; Storyboarded by : Hirotsugu Kawasaki	Jun Kamiya	Keizō Shimizu	February 4, 2020	June 7, 2020
121	121	"Three Problems"; Transliteration: "Mitsu no Komatta Koto" (Japanese: 3つの困ったこと)	Directed by : Matsuo Asami; Storyboarded by : Yukihiro Matsushita	Kanichi Katō	Kyung Hwan Kim & Hiroshi Numata	February 11, 2020	June 14, 2020
122	122	"As Pitch Black as It Gets"; Transliteration: "Makkurokekke" (Japanese: 真っ黒けっけ)	Directed by : Matsuo Asami; Storyboarded by : Masayuki Takahashi	Kazuyuki Fudeyasu	Hirokimi Shiratori & Itsuko Takeda	February 18, 2020	June 21, 2020
123	123	"Nero Reminisces... Part One"; Transliteration: "Nero: Tsuikai Soshite... Zenpen" (Japanese: ネロ、追懐そして…前編)	Directed by : Rokō Ogiwara; Storyboarded by : Taisuke Mori	Kazuyuki Fudeyasu	Nami Hayashi	February 25, 2020	June 28, 2020
124	124	"Nero Reminisces... Part Two"; Transliteration: "Nero: Tsuikai Soshite... Kōhen" (Japanese: ネロ、追懐そして…後編)	Directed by : Ryōhei Horiuchi; Storyboarded by : Taisuke Mori	Kazuyuki Fudeyasu	Nami Hayashi	March 3, 2020	July 12, 2020 (Note: Adult Swim showed a Dragon Ball Super marathon on July 4–5, 2020)
125	125	"Return"; Transliteration: "Kikan" (Japanese: 帰還)	Directed by : Akira Shimizu; Storyboarded by : Yukihiro Matsushita	Kanichi Katō	Keizō Shimizu	March 10, 2020	July 19, 2020
126	126	"The Blue Rose's Confession"; Transliteration: "Aobara no Kokuhaku" (Japanese: 碧薔薇の告白)	Tsurumi Mukoyama	Kazuyuki Fudeyasu	Nami Hayashi & Hiroshi Numata	March 17, 2020	July 26, 2020 (Note: Due to special scheduling coinciding with Adult Swim's virtual convention, Black Clover was moved back 20 minutes from its usual 1:30 a.m. EDT/PDT timeslot (1:50 a.m. EDT/PDT) on the night of July 25–26, 2020. It returned to the timeslot the following week.)
127	127	"Clues"; Transliteration: "Tegakari" (Japanese: 手掛かり)	Directed by : Fumio Maezono; Storyboarded by : Yoriyasu Kogawa	Kanichi Katō	Hirokimi Shiratori	March 24, 2020	August 2, 2020
Heart Kingdom Training Arc
128	128	"To the Heart Kingdom!"; Transliteration: "Hāto Ōkoku e!" (Japanese: ハート王国へ!)	Ayataka Tanemura	Kunihiko Okada	Hiroshi Numata & Kosei Takahashi	March 31, 2020	August 9, 2020
129	129	"Devil Megicula"; Transliteration: "Akuma Megikyura" (Japanese: 悪魔メギキュラ)	Directed by : Toshiaki Kanbara; Storyboarded by : Takashi Iida	Mio Inoue	Itsuko Takeda	April 7, 2020	August 30, 2020 (Note: Adult Swim showed four animated Batman films in partnership with DC FanDome on August 15–16 and August 22–23, 2020)
130	130	"The New Magic Knight Captain Conference"; Transliteration: "Shin Mahō Kishi-dan Danchō Kaigi" (Japanese: 新・魔法騎士団団長会議)	Directed by : Matsuo Asami; Storyboarded by : Yukihiro Matsushita	Kazuyuki Fudeyasu	Kyung Hwan Kim & Hiroshi Numata	April 14, 2020	September 6, 2020
131	131	"A New Resolve"; Transliteration: "Aratanaru Ketsui" (Japanese: 新たなる決意)	Directed by : Matsuo Asami; Storyboarded by : Shigehisa Iida	Jun Kamiya	Hirokimi Shiratori	April 21, 2020	September 13, 2020
132	132	"The Lion Awakens"; Transliteration: "Mezameru Shishi" (Japanese: 目覚める獅子)	Directed by : Rokō Ogiwara; Storyboarded by : Yukihiro Matsushita	Kanichi Katō	Hiroshi Numata	April 28, 2020	September 20, 2020
133	133	"The Lion Awakens, Continued"; Transliteration: "Zoku Mezameru Shishi" (Japanese: 続・目覚める獅子)	Directed by : Toshihiro Maeya; Storyboarded by : Takashi Iida	Kanichi Katō	Keizō Shimizu	July 7, 2020	September 27, 2020
134	134	"Those Who Have Been Gathered"; Transliteration: "Atsumerareta Monotachi" (Japanese: 集められた者たち)	Directed by : Shigeo Koshi; Storyboarded by : Yukihiro Matsushita	Kunihiko Okada	Hiroshi Numata	July 14, 2020	October 4, 2020
135	135	"The One Who Has My Heart, My Mind, and Soul"; Transliteration: "Kokoro ni, Kokoro ni, Kokoro ni Kimeta Hito" (Japanese: 心に、心に、心に決めた人)	Directed by : Fumio Maezono; Storyboarded by : Yūsuke Onoda	Mio Inoue	Hirokimi Shiratori	July 21, 2020	October 11, 2020
136	136	"A Black Deep-Sea Story"; Transliteration: "Kuro no Shinkai Monogatari" (Japanese: 黒の深海物語)	Directed by : Tsurumi Mukoyama; Storyboarded by : Tatsuya Yoshihara, Ayataka Tanemura & Yoshihiro Sugai	Mio Inoue	Kyung Hwan Kim, Itsuko Takeda, Hiroshi Numata & Nami Hayashi	July 28, 2020	October 25, 2020 (Note: Adult Swim preempted Black Clover on the night of October 17–18, 2020)
137	137	"Charmy's Century of Hunger, Gordon's Millennium of Loneliness"; Transliteration: "Chāmī Hyaku-nen no Shokuyoku to Gōdon Sen'nen no Kodoku" (Japanese: チャーミー百年の食欲とゴードン千年の孤独)	Directed by : Naoki Horiuchi; Storyboarded by : Shigehisa Iida	Masanao Akahoshi & Kunihiko Okada	Hiroshi Numata	August 4, 2020	February 14, 2021 (Note: Adult Swim placed Black Clover on hiatus after the night of October 24–25, 2020, due to production delays for the English dub caused by the COVID-19 pandemic. The anime resumed its broadcast on the night of February 13–14, 2021.)
138	138	"In Zara's Footsteps"; Transliteration: "Zara o Tsugu Mono" (Japanese: ザラを継ぐ者)	Directed by : Toshiaki Kanbara; Storyboarded by : Takashi Iida	Masanao Akahoshi	Hirokimi Shiratori	August 11, 2020	February 21, 2021
139	139	"A Witch's Homecoming"; Transliteration: "Majo no Kikyō" (Japanese: 魔女の帰郷)	Directed by : Yasumi Mikamoto; Storyboarded by : Yukihiro Matsushita	Kunihiko Okada	Hiroshi Numata	August 18, 2020	February 28, 2021
140	140	"A Favor for Julius"; Transliteration: "Yuriusu no Tanomi Koto" (Japanese: ユリウスの頼み事)	Ayataka Tanemura	Kanichi Katō	Kosei Takahashi & Hiroshi Numata	August 25, 2020	March 7, 2021
141	141	"The Golden Family"; Transliteration: "Konjiki no Kazoku" (Japanese: 金色の家族)	Directed by : Akira Shimizu; Storyboarded by : Takashi Iida	Mio Inoue	Keizō Shimizu	September 1, 2020	March 14, 2021
142	142	"Those Remaining"; Transliteration: "Nokosareta Hitobito" (Japanese: 残された人々)	Directed by : Rokō Ogiwara; Storyboarded by : Shigehisa Iida	Kazuyuki Fudeyasu	Hiroshi Numata	September 8, 2020	March 21, 2021
143	143	"The Tilted Scale"; Transliteration: "Katamuita Tenbin" (Japanese: 傾いた天秤)	Directed by : Fumio Maezono; Storyboarded by : Yukihiro Matsushita	Masanao Akahoshi	Hirokimi Shiratori	September 15, 2020	March 28, 2021
144	144	"Those Who Wish for the Devil's Demise"; Transliteration: "Akuma no Horobi o Negau Mono" (Japanese: 悪魔の滅びを願う者)	Directed by : Shigeru Fukase; Storyboarded by : Takashi Iida	Kunihiko Okada	Keizō Shimizu	September 22, 2020	April 4, 2021
145	145	"Rescue"; Transliteration: "Dakkan" (Japanese: 奪還)	Naoki Matsuura	Kanichi Katō	Hiroshi Numata, Nami Hayashi & Kyung Hwan Kim	September 29, 2020	April 11, 2021
146	146	"Those Who Worship the Devil"; Transliteration: "Akuma o Agameru Monotachi" (Japanese: 悪魔をあがめる者たち)	Directed by : Matsuo Asami; Storyboarded by : Shigehisa Iida	Masanao Akahoshi	Hiroshi Numata	October 6, 2020	April 18, 2021
147	147	"Prepared to Die"; Transliteration: "Kesshi" (Japanese: 決死)	Directed by : Fumio Maezono; Storyboarded by : Takashi Iida	Kazuyuki Fudeyasu	Hirokimi Shiratori	October 13, 2020	April 25, 2021
148	148	"Becoming the Light That Shines Through the Darkness"; Transliteration: "Yami o Terasu Hikari ni Naru" (Japanese: 闇を照らす光になる)	Naoki Kotani	Kazuyuki Fudeyasu	Hiroshi Numata & Kyung Hwan Kim	October 20, 2020	May 2, 2021
149	149	"Two Things We Need to Find"; Transliteration: "Futatsu no Sagashi Mono" (Japanese: ふたつのさがしもの)	Directed by : Akira Shimizu; Storyboarded by : Yukihiro Matsushita	Masanao Akahoshi	Keizō Shimizu	October 27, 2020	May 9, 2021
150	150	"The Maidens' Challenge"; Transliteration: "Otometachi no Chōsen" (Japanese: 乙女たちの挑戦)	Tsurumi Mukoyama	Kunihiko Okada	Kosei Takahashi & Hiroshi Numata	November 3, 2020	May 16, 2021
151	151	"Clash! The Battle of the Magic Knights Squad Captains"; Transliteration: "Gekitotsu! Mahō Kishidan Danchōsen!" (Japanese: 激突!魔法騎士団団長戦!)	Isuta	Mio Inoue	Nami Hayashi & Hiroshi Numata	November 10, 2020	May 23, 2021
152	152	"To Tomorrow!"; Transliteration: "Ashita e!" (Japanese: 明日へ!)	Directed by : Fumio Maezono; Storyboarded by : Yukihiro Matsushita	Kazuyuki Fudeyasu	Hirokimi Shiratori & Itsuko Takeda	November 17, 2020	May 30, 2021
153	153	"The Chosen Ones"; Transliteration: "Erabareshi Monotachi" (Japanese: 選ばれし者たち)	Shigehisa Iida	Momoko Murakami	Hiroshi Numata & Kyung Hwan Kim	November 24, 2020	June 6, 2021
154	154	"Vice Captain Langris Vaude"; Transliteration: "Fuku-danchō Rangirusu Vōdo" (Japanese: 副団長ランギルス・ヴォード)	Directed by : Rokō Ogiwara; Storyboarded by : Naoki Kotani & Ayataka Tanemura	Masanao Akahoshi	Hiroshi Numata & Nami Hayashi	December 1, 2020	June 13, 2021
155	155	"The 5 Spirit Guardians"; Transliteration: "Go-nin no Seirei no Kami" (Japanese: 5人の精霊守)	Directed by : Fumio Maezono; Storyboarded by : Takashi Iida	Kunihiko Okada	Hirokimi Shiratori	December 8, 2020	June 20, 2021
156	156	"Awakening Powers"; Transliteration: "Mezame Yuku Chikara" (Japanese: 目覚めゆく力)	Directed by : Chihiro Kumano; Storyboarded by : Yukihiro Matsushita	Mio Inoue	Keizō Shimizu	December 15, 2020	June 27, 2021
157	157	"Five-Leaf Clover"; Transliteration: "Itsutsuba no Kurōbā" (Japanese: 五つ葉のクローバー)	Takahiro Enokida	Kanichi Katō	Kyung Hwan Kim	December 22, 2020	July 4, 2021
Heart Kingdom Joint Struggle Arc
158	158	"The Beginning of Hope and Despair"; Transliteration: "Kibō to Zetsubō no Makuake" (Japanese: 希望と絶望の幕開け)	Naoki Matsuura	Kunihiko Okada	Shunji Akasaka & Kyung Hwan Kim	January 5, 2021	July 11, 2021
159	159	"Quiet Lakes and Forest Shadows"; Transliteration: "Shizuka na Mizuumi to Mori no Kage" (Japanese: 静かな湖と森の影)	Directed by : Fumio Maezono; Storyboarded by : Takashi Iida	Mio Inoue	Hirokimi Shiratori	January 12, 2021	July 18, 2021
160	160	"The Messenger from the Spade Kingdom"; Transliteration: "Supēdo Ōkoku no Shisha" (Japanese: スペード王国の使者)	Tsurumi Mukoyama	Masanao Akahoshi	Kosei Takahashi & Hiroshi Numata	January 19, 2021	July 25, 2021
161	161	"Zenon's Power"; Transliteration: "Zenon no Chikara" (Japanese: ゼノンの力)	Directed by : Akira Shimizu; Storyboarded by : Shigehisa Iida	Momoko Murakami	Keizō Shimizu & Hiroshi Numata	January 26, 2021	August 15, 2021 (Note: Adult Swim preempted Black Clover on the night of July 31–August 1, 2021. The following week on August 7–8, Adult Swim showed a Harley Quinn marathon.)
162	162	"The Great War Breaks Out"; Transliteration: "Taisen Boppatsu" (Japanese: 大戦勃発)	Naoki Kotani	Kunihiko Okada	Shunji Akasaka, Nami Hayashi & Kyung Hwan Kim	February 2, 2021	August 22, 2021
163	163	"Dante vs. the Captain of the Black Bulls"; Transliteration: "Dante Bāsasu Kuro no Bōgyū Danchō" (Japanese: ダンテVS黒の暴牛団長)	Directed by : Rokō Ogiwara; Storyboarded by : Yukihiro Matsushita	Momoko Murakami	Hiroshi Numata	February 9, 2021	August 29, 2021
164	164	"Battlefield: Heart Kingdom"; Transliteration: "Senjō Hāto Ōkoku" (Japanese: 戦場 ハート王国)	Directed by : Matsuo Asami & Fumio Maezono; Storyboarded by : Takashi Iida	Mio Inoue	Hirokimi Shiratori	February 16, 2021	September 5, 2021
165	165	"Water Crusade"; Transliteration: "Mizu no Seisen" (Japanese: 水の聖戦)	Directed by : Matsuo Asami; Storyboarded by : Yukihiro Matsushita	Masanao Akahoshi	Hiroshi Numata	February 23, 2021	September 12, 2021
166	166	"Captain: Yami Sukehiro"; Transliteration: "Danchō Yami Sukehiro" (Japanese: 団長 ヤミ・スケヒロ)	Naoki Matsuura	Kunihiko Okada	Shunji Akasaka, Nami Hayashi & Hiroshi Numata	March 2, 2021	September 19, 2021
167	167	"Black Oath"; Transliteration: "Kuro no Chikai" (Japanese: 黒の誓い)	Directed by : Naoki Kotani; Storyboarded by : Naoki Kotani & Isuta	Masanao Akahoshi	Hiroshi Numata, Itsuko Takeda & Kyung Hwan Kim	March 9, 2021	September 26, 2021
168	168	"Stirrings of the Strongest"; Transliteration: "Saikyō no Taidō" (Japanese: 最強の胎動)	Directed by : Matsuo Asami; Storyboarded by : Yukihiro Matsushita	Mio Inoue	Hirokimi Shiratori	March 16, 2021	October 3, 2021
169	169	"The Devil-Binding Ritual"; Transliteration: "Jūma no Gi" (Japanese: 従魔の儀)	Directed by : Tsurumi Mukoyama; Storyboarded by : Shigehisa Iida	Momoko Murakami	Kosei Takahashi	March 23, 2021	October 10, 2021
170	170	"The Faraway Future"; Transliteration: "Haruka Mirai" (Japanese: ハルカミライ)	Directed by : Rokō Ogiwara, Ayataka Tanemura & Takahiro Enokida; Storyboarded by : Ayataka Tanemura	Kanichi Katō	Itsuko Takeda & Kosei Takahashi	March 30, 2021	October 10, 2021

=== Season 2 (2026) ===
No. overall	No. in season	Title	Directed by	Written by	Chief animation directed by	Original release date
171	1	"The Battle Begins"; Transliteration: "Kaisen" (Japanese: 開戦)	Directed by : Toshihiro Maeya; Storyboarded by : Ayataka Tanemura	Keiichirō Ōchi	Itsuko Takeda & Kosei Takahashi	October 3, 2026
172	2	"The Door to Hell"; Transliteration: "Jigoku e no Tobira" (Japanese: 地獄への扉)	Directed by : Tomoki Nakano; Storyboarded by : Shigehisa Iida	Keiichirō Ōchi	Itsuko Takeda	October 10, 2026
173	3	"Black Guardian"; Transliteration: "Kuroki Shugosha" (Japanese: 黒き守護者)	Ayumu Ono	Keiichirō Ōchi	Itsuko Takeda & Kumiko Tokunaga	October 17, 2026
174	4	"Day of Atonement"; Transliteration: "Shokuzai no Hi" (Japanese: 贖罪の日)	Directed by : Ji-Eun Park & Toshihiro Maeya; Storyboarded by : Ayataka Tanemura & Tessai Izumi	Keiichirō Ōchi	Itsuko Takeda & Yi Zhang	October 24, 2026
175	5	"The Highest vs. the Lowest"; Transliteration: "Saijō bāsasu Saitei" (Japanese: 最上VS最低)	Directed by : Toshihiro Maeya & Ayataka Tanemura; Storyboarded by : Jay1Jay1Jay1 & Ayataka Tanemura	Keiichirō Ōchi	Kosei Takahashi	October 31, 2026
176	6	"The Sacred Valkyrie"; Transliteration: "Seinaru Ikusaotome" (Japanese: 聖なる戦乙女)	Takahiro Ōtsuka	Keiichirō Ōchi	Kosei Takahashi & Takaya Sunagawa	November 7, 2026
177	7	"Beyond Tenacity"; Transliteration: "Futei no Saki" (Japanese: 不諦の先)	Directed by : Hironori Tanaka; Storyboarded by : Hironori Tanaka & Chiaki Kon	Keiichirō Ōchi	Itsuko Takeda, Kumiko Tokunaga & Takaya Sunagawa	November 14, 2026
178	8	"A Devil's Heart"; Transliteration: "Akuma no Shinzō" (Japanese: 悪魔の心臓)	TBA	TBA	TBA	November 21, 2026
