= Jill Harris =

American voice actress

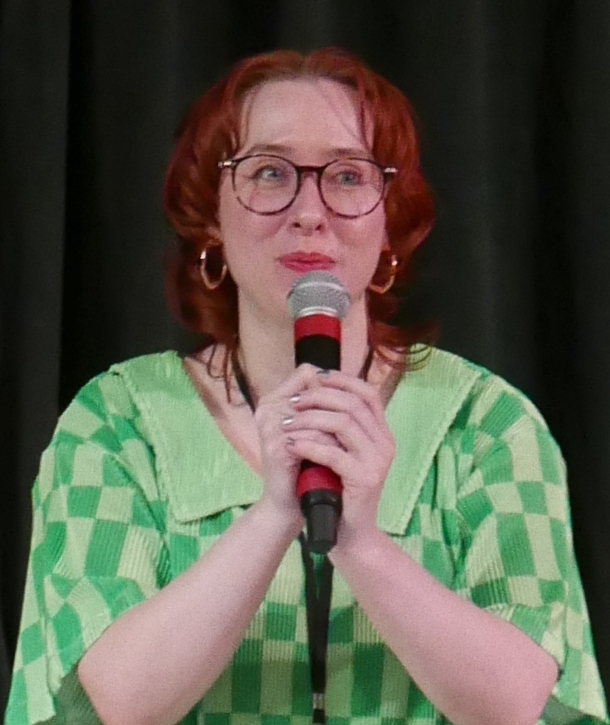
- Harris in 2026
- Born: Clarksville, Tennessee, U.S.
- Occupation: Voice actress
- Years active: 2015–present
- Notable work: Orange as Naho Takamiya; Overlord as Aura Bella Fiora; Fuuka as Fuuka Akitsuki; Black Clover as Noelle Silva; Aokana - Four Rhythms Across the Blue as Asuka Kurashina; Hazbin Hotel (pilot) as Charlie Morningstar; Mobile Suit Gundam: The Witch from Mercury as Suletta Mercury; Frieren: Beyond Journey's End as Fern
- Spouse: Dallas Reid (m. 2019; div. 2025)
- Website: jillharrisvo.com

Jill Harris is an American voice actress. She has been voice acting professionally since 2015 and received her first lead role with Naho Takamiya in Orange. Some of her other roles include Aura Bella Flora in Overlord, Fuuka Akitsuki in Fuuka, Noelle Silva in Black Clover, Mayaka Ibara in Hyouka, Shino "Mandalay" Sosaki in My Hero Academia, Nino Nakano in The Quintessential Quintuplets, Yuzuriha in Hell's Paradise: Jigokuraku, Izumi Yasaka in Psycho-Pass: Sinners of the System, Asuka Kurashina in Aokana - Four Rhythms Across the Blue, and Charlie Morningstar in the pilot episode of Hazbin Hotel. Harris is also the English dub voice of Kana Ichinose's characters such as Suletta Mercury in Mobile Suit Gundam: The Witch From Mercury, Fern in Frieren: Beyond Journey's End, Sayu Ogiwara in Higehiro, and Marlya Noel in Fairy Gone.

== Personal life ==
Harris became engaged with voice actor Dallas Reid in 2019 and married them later that year.

On November 22, 2023, at Anime Weekend Atlanta, she revealed she identifies as queer.

On October 4, 2025, she announced she and Reid were getting divorced.

== Filmography ==
=== Anime ===
List of voice performances in anime
Year	Title	Role	Notes	Source
2016	Assassination Classroom	Sakura Kiyashiki	Season 2	
2016	Divine Gate	Shakespeare		
2016	Dagashi Kashi	Ono		
2016	Fairy Tail	Lamy		
2016	Aokana: Four Rhythm Across the Blue	Asuka Kurashina		
2016	Planetarian	Yumemi Hoshino		
2016	The Disastrous Life of Saiki K.	Chiyo Yumehara	Funimation Dub, Season 1 only	
2016	Orange	Naho Takamiya	First major role	
2016	Three Leaves, Three Colors	Sakura Usuda		
2016	Regalia: The Three Sacred Stars	Tia Kleis/Aurea Tisis		
2016	Overlord	Aura Bella Flora		
2016	Castle Town Dandelion	Hana Sato		
2016	Izetta: The Last Witch	Lotte		
2017	Fuuka	Fuuka Akitsuki		
2017	Luck & Logic	Shiori		
2017	The Royal Tutor	Licht von Glanzreich (young)		
2017	18if	Natsuki Kamikawa		
2017	WorldEnd	Lakhesh		
2017	Ace Attorney	Phoenix Wright (young)		
2017	Sakura Quest	Erika Suzuki		
2017	Kado: The Right Answer	Yukika Shindō		
2017	Brave Witches	Edytha Rossmann		
2017	Alice & Zoroku	Chen		
2017	KanColle: Kantai Collection	Mochizuki		
2017	Samurai Warriors	Suzu		
2017	New Game!	Hifumi Takimoto		
2017	Hyouka	Mayaka Ibara		
2017–21	Restaurant to Another World	Aletta		
2017–21	Black Clover	Noelle Silva		
2017–23	In Another World with My Smartphone	Linze Silhoueska		
2017	Future Diary: Redial	Mao Nonosaka		
2017	King's Game The Animation	Nami Hirano		
2017	Code: Realize − Guardian of Rebirth	Cardia Beckford		
2017–24	The Ancient Magus' Bride	Philomela Sargant, Ally (ep 4), Additional Voices		
2018	Cardcaptor Sakura: Clear Card	Chiharu Mihara		
2018	Death March to the Parallel World Rhapsody	Lulu		
2018	Tokyo Ghoul:re	Hairu Ihei		
2018–24	My Hero Academia	Mandalay		
2018	Kakuriyo: Bed and Breakfast for Spirits	Ōgon Dōji		
2018	Hanebado!	Riko Izumi		
2018	SSSS.Gridman	Rikka Takarada		
2019	Magical Girl Spec-Ops Asuka	Lau Peipei/Shantoulon Peipei		
2019	Boogiepop and Others	Kei Niitoki	7 episodes	
2019	The Quintessential Quintuplets	Nino Nakano		
2019	Fairy Gone	Marlya Noel		
2019	Isekai Quartet	Aura Bella Flora		
2019	Kono Oto Tomare! Sounds of Life	Uta Suzumori		
2019	Stand My Heroes	Rei Izumi		
2019	Fruits Basket (2019)	Satomi (ep12), Additional Voices, Tohru and Kyo's Granddaughter (ep63)	Seasons 1, 3	
2020	Plunderer	Saki Ichinose		
2020	The Gymnastics Samurai	Rei Aragaki		
2020	Golden Kamuy	Beniko	Season 3	
2021	Wonder Egg Priority	Minami		
2021	Shachibato! President, It's Time for Battle!	Yutoria		
2021	Love Live! Nijigasaki High School Idol Club	Shizuku Osaka		
2021	Sonny Boy	Kodama		
2021	That Time I Got Reincarnated as a Slime Season 2	Luminous Valentine		
2022	One Piece	Charlotte Pudding		
2022	Heroines Run the Show	Hina	Assistant ADR Director	
2022	Aharen-san Is Indecipherable	Futaba		
2022	The Slime Diaries: That Time I Got Reincarnated as a Slime	Gobchi		
2022	Higehiro: After Being Rejected, I Shaved and Took in a High School Runaway	Sayu Ogiwara		
2022	Sing "Yesterday" for Me	Haru Nonaka		
2022–present	Natsume's Book of Friends	Hiiragi		
2023	Mobile Suit Gundam: The Witch from Mercury	Suletta Mercury		
2023–present	Hell's Paradise: Jigokuraku	Yuzuriha		
2023	Sacrificial Princess and the King of Beasts	Maria	2 episodes	
2023	Reign of the Seven Spellblades	Katie		
2023–present	Frieren: Beyond Journey's End	Fern		
2023	Shy	Lady Black		
2023	I'm in Love with the Villainess	Lilly Lilium		
2023	The Apothecary Diaries	Servant Girl		
2024	Hokkaido Gals Are Super Adorable!	Rena Natsukawa		
2024	Re:Monster	Gobue		
2024	Alya Sometimes Hides Her Feelings in Russian	Maria "Masha" Mikhailovna Kujou		
2024	Why Does Nobody Remember Me in This World?	Saki		
2024	Nina the Starry Bride	Nina		
2024	That Time I Got Reincarnated as a Slime Season 3	Luminous Valentine		
2025	I May Be a Guild Receptionist, But I'll Solo Any Boss to Clock Out on Time	Alina		
2025	Tying the Knot with an Amagami Sister	Karen		
2026	Takopi's Original Sin	Marina		
2026	The Angel Next Door Spoils Me Rotten	Mahiru		

=== Films ===
List of voice performances in films
Year	Title	Role	Notes	Source
2016	One Piece Film: Gold	Rich		
2022	The Quintessential Quintuplets Movie	Nino Nakano		
2023	Black Clover: Sword of the Wizard King	Noelle Silva		
2024	Spy × Family Code: White	Waitress		

=== Video games ===
List of voice performances in video games
Year	Title	Role	Notes	Source
2016	Battleborn	Alani		
2016	Battlerite	Poloma		
2018	Highway Blossoms	Marina Hale		In-game credits, remastered version
2018	Smite	Fabled Artio, Sugar Plum Willo, Persephone Cute Cultivator		
2019	Borderlands 3	Killavolt Fangirls, Lana, Pandora Female		
2021	Mobile Suit Gundam: Battle Operation 2	Mia Brinkmann		In-game credits

=== Animation ===
List of voice performances in animation
Year	Title	Role	Notes	Source
2019	Hazbin Hotel	Charlotte "Charlie" Morningstar	Lead role, pilot only	
2025	To Be Hero X	Lucky Cyan		

=== Web ===
List of voice performances in web series
Year	Title	Role	Notes	Source
2013-present	Starter Squad	Sgt. Caterpie, Caterpies, May		Credits,
