= Sukehiro =

- Gender: Male

Origin
- Origin: Japanese
- Meaning: Different meanings depending on the kanji used

Sukehiro (written: 祐弘 or 輔煕) is a masculine Japanese given name. Notable people with the name include:

- Sukehiro Hasegawa (長谷川 祐弘) (born 1942), Japanese diplomat
- Takatsukasa Sukehiro (鷹司 輔煕) (1807–1878), Japanese kugyō

== Fictional characters ==
- Yami Sukehiro, a character in Black Clover
