= Black Clover (TV series) =

Japanese anime television series

- ブラッククローバー; Burakku Kurōbā
- Type: Television series
- Genre: Adventure; Fantasy
- Based on: Black Clover by Yūki Tabata
- Directed by: Tatsuya Yoshihara (S1) (Note: Credited as chief director from #153–170); Ayataka Tanemura (#153–) (Note: Served as assistant director from #28–152)
- Series composition: Kazuyuki Fudeyasu; (#1–152); Kanichi Katō; (#153–170); Keiichirō Ōchi (S2)
- Music by: Minako Seki
- Voices of: Gakuto Kajiwara; Nobunaga Shimazaki; Kana Yūki; Junichi Suwabe; Asuka Nishi; Nobuhiko Okamoto
- Country of origin: Japan
- Original language: Japanese
- No. of seasons: 2 (Note: Despite the first 170 episodes of the series being split into four seasons for its English home media release, the continuation of the series was announced in Japan and by Crunchyroll as a second season. Since then, Crunchyroll has stopped referencing the original division of seasons and instead refers to them as parts of the first season.)
- No. of episodes: 178 + OVA (list of episodes)

Production
- Cinematographers: Tomoyuki Kunii (S1); Keisuke Nozawa (S2)
- Editors: Hiroshi Okuda (S1); Ayumu Takahashi (S2)
- Studio: Studio Pierrot
- Producers: Maiko Isogai; Naomi Komatsu; Masahiro Sugasawa; (#1–128); Hatsuo Nara (#129–170)
- Production companies: TV Tokyo; Pierrot
- Runtime: 23 minutes

Original release
- Network: TV Tokyo
- Release: October 3, 2017 – present

Related
- Original net animation

Squishy! Black Clover
- Directed by: Tsukasa Nishiyama
- Written by: Kazuyuki Fudeyasu; Kanichi Katou
- Studio: DLE
- Licensed by: Crunchyroll
- Released: July 1, 2019 – August 19, 2019
- Runtime: 6–9 minutes
- Episodes: 8
- Film
- Black Clover: Sword of the Wizard King (2023)

Black Clover (Japanese: ブラッククローバー, Hepburn: Burakku Kurōbā) is a Japanese anime television series based on the manga series Black Clover by Yūki Tabata. The series follows Asta, a young boy born without any magic power in a world where magic is everything, and his rival Yuno, a talented mage gifted with the rare four-leaf grimoire.

Produced by Pierrot, the first season aired on TV Tokyo and its TXN affiliates from October 2017 to March 2021 and consisted of 170 episodes. A second season premiered in October 2026. An anime film, titled Black Clover: Sword of the Wizard King, premiered simultaneously in Japanese theaters and on Netflix internationally in June 2023.

== Plot ==
The series focuses on Asta, a young orphan who is left to be raised in an orphanage in a rural village alongside his fellow orphan, Yuno. While everyone is born with the ability to utilize mana in the form of magical power, Asta was born without mana, and thus has no way to use magic. Instead, he focuses on physical strength. Conversely, Yuno was born as a prodigy with immense magical power and the talent to control wind magic.

Motivated by a desire to become the next Wizard King, an authority figure second to the king of Clover Kingdom, the two youths developed a friendly rivalry. Yuno obtains a legendary four-leaf grimoire held by the kingdom's first Wizard King. The four-leaf grimoire is a rare grimoire, only given to the most immense mages. Asta, despite his lack of magic, obtained an enigmatic five-leaf grimoire that contains mysterious elf swords and a bodiless member of the Devil race who utilizes rare anti-magic. Afterwards, Asta and Yuno each join a Magic Knight squad as the first step to fulfill their ambitions.

Asta joins the Black Bulls under Yami Sukehiro alongside Noelle Silva, while Yuno becomes a member of the Golden Dawn. They embark on various adventures while contending with an extremist group called the Eye of the Midnight Sun, whose leadership is manipulated by a Devil in avenging an injustice committed against the Elves by the Clover Kingdom at the time of its founding. The Magic Knights then face the Dark Triad of the Spade Kingdom, with Asta and Yuno learning of their Devils' influence on their lives and of the Dark Triad's plan to fully manifest the Devils into their world. Then the Magic Knights face the Dark Triad's eldest sibling, Lucius Zogratis, who wants to create his own perfect world.

== Series overview ==
Season	Episodes	Originally released	
Season	Episodes	First released	Last released
1	170	October 3, 2017	March 30, 2021
2	7	October 3, 2026	TBA

== Production and release ==
At the Black Clover Jump Festa event on December 18, 2016, the anime television series adaptation by Pierrot was announced. It was directed by Tatsuya Yoshihara, with Kazuyuki Fudeyasu writing scripts, Itsuko Takeda designing the characters, and Minako Seki composing the music. The series premiered on TV Tokyo and its TXN affiliates on October 3, 2017. The series was broadcast without any major interruption until late April 2020, when it was announced that future episodes would be postponed due to studio production delays caused by the COVID-19 pandemic. The broadcasting and distribution of Episode 133 onward were delayed and in its place, the first episode of the series was rebroadcast on May 5, 2020. The series resumed on July 7 of the same year, and the first season concluded with Episode 170 on March 30, 2021.

In July 2025, at Anime Expo, it was announced that the series would receive a second season, which will be also produced by Pierrot and directed by Ayataka Tanemura. It premiered on October 3, 2026.

A special episode, titled "The All Magic Knights Thanksgiving Festa" (オール魔法騎士感謝祭, Ōru Mahō Kishi Kanshasai), was shown at the 2018 Jump Festa. A short original net animation titled Squishy! Black Clover (むぎゅっと！ブラッククローバー, Mugyutto! Burakku Kurōbā), produced by DLE and directed by Tsukasa Nishiyama, began streaming on dTV on July 1, 2019. The opening theme song for the short is "Possible" by Gakuto Kajiwara and Nobunaga Shimazaki, under the name "Clover×Clover". Crunchyroll made the short available internationally on December 31, 2019.

=== International release ===
Logo of the anime for international release

Crunchyroll has simulcast the series, while Funimation produced an English dub as part of its SimulDub program as it aired. Adult Swim's Toonami programming block premiered the English dub on December 2, 2017. The series was added to the Hulu streaming service. Sony Pictures UK and Funimation released the first part of the series on home video in the United Kingdom and Ireland, with subsequent parts released by Manga Entertainment. Universal Sony classified the first part of the series for release in Australia and New Zealand, on behalf of Funimation, with Madman Entertainment releasing subsequent parts. The first of Black Clover became available on Netflix India with Japanese audio and English subtitles on February 23, 2021.

=== Film ===
On March 28, 2021, it was announced that the series would be receiving an anime film, with details to be revealed at a later date. It was later announced that the film's title is Black Clover: Sword of the Wizard King (ブラッククローバー 魔法帝の剣, Burakku Kurōbā: Mahōtei no Ken). It was directed by Ayataka Tanemura, with the screenplay written by Johnny Onda and Ai Orii, character designs by Itsuko Takeda, and music by Minako Seki. Tabata also supervised the film and provide the original character designs. The film was originally set to premiere simultaneously in Japanese theaters and internationally on Netflix on March 31, 2023; however, it was later delayed to June 16 of the same year due to the COVID-19 pandemic affecting its production. Treasure performed the theme song "Here I Stand".

== Reception ==
=== Critical response ===
Alex Osborn of IGN, in his review of the first episode, mentioned that its premise is not novel but concludes that it is "ultimately a solid introduction to the Clover Kingdom, and lays the groundwork for what will hopefully be an empowering story about the importance of never giving up." Writing for Anime News Network, Rachel Trujillo praised the anime for "the grand lessons that one can take away from the story" and ambitious animation efforts from the staff. In his review of Episode 170, Shawn Hacaga of The Fandom Post complimented the anime's improvement since its beginning, saying that he was "glad that Black Clover was able to turn it around."

Ivy Rose from Anime Feminist praised the way the story handles its female characters, giving them narrative importance and letting them partake in battles. Rose wrote: "Black Clover has truly raised the bar for depictions of female leaders in shounen anime, and female characters in general, as these solid portrayals are not just limited to women in leadership positions." Jeremy Looney of Common Sense Media, in his review about the anime said "Black Clover is a guilty pleasure, a by-the-books entry to the Shounen genre that recaptures the magic of earlier series by perfectly recycling them in its own way. A great jumping-in point for the genre for anime newcomers."

In November 2019, Crunchyroll listed Black Clover in their "Top 100 best anime of the 2010s". In January 2021, it was revealed that Black Clover was the most-watched anime series on Crunchyroll in 2020, being watched in 87 countries and territories all over the world. Asta and Yami's fight against Dante was also listed as the sixth best anime fight from 2021 by Crunchyroll.

The first episode of the second season became the most-liked episode on Crunchyroll in 2026, and the season subsequently ranked as the most-watched anime series on the same platform in October of that year.

=== Accolades ===
Year	Award	Category	Recipient	Result	Ref.
2018	6th BTVA Anime Dub Awards	Best Male Lead Vocal Performance	Dallas Reid as Asta	Nominated	
2019	3rd Crunchyroll Anime Awards	Best Continuing Series	Black Clover	Nominated	
2019	3rd Crunchyroll Anime Awards	Best Fight Scene	Yami vs. Licht	Nominated	
2022	World Music Awards	Best Selling Japanese Single	Snow Man	Won	
2022	36th Japan Gold Disc Award	Single of the Year	Snow Man	Won	
2022	36th Japan Gold Disc Award	Best 5 Singles	Snow Man	Won	
