= Asta (Black Clover) =

Fictional character from Black Clover

- Black Clover character
- Asta as drawn by Yūki Tabata for the cover of Weekly Shonen Jump, issue 36 (2015).
- First appearance: Black Clover #1, "The Boy's Vow" (2015)
- Created by: Yūki Tabata
- Voiced by: Japanese: Gakuto Kajiwara; Shun Horie (OVA); English: Dallas Reid

In-universe information
- Occupation: Magic Knight in the Black Bulls
- Family: Richita (Mother); Orsi Orfai (foster father); Yuno Grinberryall (foster brother); Liebe (adopted brother)

Asta is the protagonist of the manga series Black Clover created by Yūki Tabata. A peasant orphan who was left at a church, he aspires to become the next Wizard King. He has no magical power, but overcame this through intense physical training which allow him to wield anti-magic swords from a five-leaf clover grimoire in which a devil resides. He then becomes a Magic Knight, joining the Black Bulls squad in hopes of achieving his dream.

In the Black Clover anime adaptation, he is voiced by Gakuto Kajiwara in Japanese and Dallas Reid in English. Asta was originally the subject of mixed responses due to his characterization coming across as archetype and the tone used by Kajiwara. However, he was still received positively by critics for his determination and relationships with other characters in the series.

== Concept and creation ==
Asta was originally created as Asta Staria in the 2014 one-shot in Jump NEXT! His name comes from a flower that is derived from the Greek word that means "star". Asta's personality is inspired by his creator Yūki Tabata's. Gakuto Kajiwara, his Japanese voice actor, describes him as "pulling the people around him into his life, but in a positive way. His enthusiasm, strong will, and his desire to never give up end up moving the hearts of those around him. Even if no one ever wanted to acknowledge it, people would end up wanting to see him and acknowledge him because of his determination and strong will, and he just kept flipping how people felt about him. I don't think this just applies in the story. I think as readers of the manga, he gives us the same kind of power. I think just by seeing him, we're able to find hope and energy in our own daily lives."

== Appearances ==
=== In Black Clover ===
Asta is first seen in Black Clover as a baby left at Hage church with Yuno. He was born without any magic in the Clover Kingdom, where all its citizens are mages. Despite this disability, he aspires to become the Wizard King to end the discrimination within the country. After saving Yuno from a thief as children, the two boys make a promise to become rivals in becoming the Wizard King. At the annual grimoire ceremony for fifteen-year olds in the kingdom, Asta is not chosen by a grimoire. When Yuno is attacked by the thief Revchi for his four-leaf clover grimoire, Asta tries to stop Revchi but is beaten and learns that he has no magic at all. Nearly despairing, Yuno's acknowledgement of Asta as his rival gives him the motivation to keep fighting. He is then chosen by a five-leaf grimoire, from which he can wield a giant sword with the power of anti-magic. Asta defeats Revchi and reaffirms his promise to compete with Yuno to become the Wizard King. At the magic knight selection exam, Asta earns the respect of Yami Sukehiro and is recruited into the Black Bulls, the worst magic knights squad, with fellow newcomer Noelle Silva.

Now a magic knight, Asta completes missions assigned to him. He is assigned to explore a dungeon, where he reunites with Yuno and his group and must deal with a group from the neighboring Diamond Kingdom. There, he acquires a second anti-magic sword and eventually defeats the Diamond mage Mars with Yuno. Afterwards, at the knight-promotion ceremony he is looked down upon by the higher-born magic knights. After Noelle is humiliated by her siblings, Asta asserts that he will attain merit and become the Wizard King to silence them all. He later helps against the invasion of the Royal Capital by the Eye of the Midnight Sun. While on a break from missions a village, he encounters members of the Eye of the Midnight Sun who are abducting children. There, his captain Yami comes for help and teaches Asta how to sense ki. The other magic knight captains come as reinforcements, and the Eye of the Midnight Sun's leader Licht and the Third Eye escape.

On the Black Bulls' mission to retrieve a magic stone from the Underwater Temple, Asta encounters Third Eye member Vetto, who crushes and curses Asta's arms with forbidden magic. After a grueling battle, he and the other Black Bulls defeat Vetto. Asta's arms are unable to be healed, with the possibility that he may be unable to wield his swords again. Nearly falling into a depression, he asserts that he will defy fate if he has to, to achieve his dream. His squadmate Vanessa Enoteca goes to the Forest of Witches and pleads with the Witch Queen to heal Asta. After she does so, he goes on to help defeat Third Eye member Fana and Diamond soldier Ladros, using his new Black form from the Witch Queen using her blood magic to increase the anti-magic circulation in his body. However, the Witch Queen uses her magic to command Asta to kill his friends, which is stopped by Vanessa using her Red Thread of Fate. The queen admits defeat, giving Asta and the others a magic stone. He later learns to better control his Black form during training at a volcano.

At the Royal Knights exam, Asta confronts Langris Vaude, who nearly kills his half-brother and Asta's squadmate Finral Roulacase. In the semi-finals match, Asta defeats Langris with their crystals destroyed at the same time and the match ending in a draw. Asta is recruited into the Royal Knights squad. When the elves are reincarnated, Asta and Yuno fight the revived Licht. During the fight, Licht reclaims one of his swords with Asta taking a sword from Licht that allows him to remove the elf soul from their host body before the duo are defeated. Asta helps defeat and dispel the souls of reincarnated elves throughout the kingdom. At the Shadow Palace, Asta brings Patry out of his despair after the true mastermind of the elf massacre is revealed to be the devil Zagred, convincing him to atone for his misdeeds and help defeat their common enemy. With the help of Yuno, Yami, and Secre, Asta destroys the devil's heart. In the aftermath, Asta and Secre are made scapegoats by the kingdom's Magic Parliament for the elf reincarnation. Through a decree, Asta is put under the Black Bulls' custody and assigned to investigate devils. Their investigations lead the magic knights to ally with the Heart Kingdom against the Spade Kingdom, with Asta training for six months.

When Asta returns to the Black Bulls hideout, he battles Dante Zogratis alongside Yami whom they defeat but Yami is captured by Zenon Zogratis. Asta later receives training from Nacht Faust to master Devil Union with Liebe, the devil that was sealed in Asta's grimoire. After mastering Devil Union, they travel to the Spade Kingdom to battle the Dark Triad and the devils including Lucifero. About a year after the Spade Kingdom battle, he battles Lucius Zogratis but is defeated and sent to the Land of the Sun by Sister Lily, who was turned into a Paladin by Lucius, and trains with Ichika, Yami's sister, and the Ryuzen Seven to master Zetten. When Sister Lily, Heath Grice, and Yrul invade the Land of the Sun, he finishes up his training and stops them with the help of the Ruyzen Seven. After the battle he reconciles with Ichika and continues to train with the Ryuzen Seven until the rest of the Black Bulls come to get him. He is later brought back to the Clover Kingdom with Ichika, easily defeats Damnatio, and gives the Black Bulls some of his anti-magic. He then goes to assist Yuno with his battle against Lucius.

=== Other media ===
Asta appears as a playable character in the video game Black Clover: Quartet Knights. Asta is also featured as a playable character in the crossover game Jump Force. He also appears on Black Clover: Sword of the Wizard King. On September 29, 2026, it was announced that Asta would make an appearance in the popular battle royale game Fortnite in promotion for Halloween's Fortnitemares 2026, where he would officially debut on October 3, 2026.

== Powers and abilities ==
To compensate for having no magic, since childhood Asta has intensely trained his body to have incredible physical strength. This strength allows him to wield the heavy anti-magic swords, which allow him to cancel out magic. The Demon-Slayer Sword is able to enlarge using anti-magic and reflect back spells. The Demon-Dweller Sword can unleash flying anti-magic slashes and absorb other magic to release as beams. The Demon-Destroyer Sword has a "causality break" effect that nullifies the effects of magic on an object. His "Black Asta" form allows him to use larger amounts of anti-magic for a limited period of time. He is also able to utilize Devil Union with Liebe. He is taught by his captain Yami how to sense "ki", detecting life force to react and attack faster. He can also utilize Zetten which is a magnified version of ki.

== Reception ==
=== Popularity ===
Asta had consistently ranked first in the yearly Japanese Black Clover popularity polls, placing first in the second poll with 3,064 votes and in the fourth poll with 4,296 votes. In the fifth and sixth poll, he placed second with 67,695 votes and 22,535 votes respectively. Asta and Yami's fight with Dante was also listed as the sixth best anime fight from 2021 by Crunchyroll. From the album Trip at Knight, the song "Demon Time" by American rappers Trippie Redd and Ski Mask the Slump God references Asta. In 2020, an anime fan couple named their son after Asta.

=== Critical response ===
Early responses to Asta's character were mixed. In his review of Volume 1, Leroy Douresseaux of ComicBookBin stated Asta's "scrappy determination and his willingness to learn about new people, places, and things make him an attractive character. I think many readers can identify with Asta, who has nothing and comes from nothing, but does not accept his limitations." Anime News Network found Asta as an underdog archetype similarly based by Izuku Midoriya from My Hero Academia and Naruto Uzumaki from Naruto with his Japanese voice actor using a tone that comes across as annoying to the audience. His early portrayal also noted similarities with the narrative of One Piece and Fairy Tail due to having similar goals and that he has a tendency to yell several times. IGN also compared his story with Izuku Midoriya and wanted the narrative to be more unique as a result. He also found Kajiwara's performance as annoying based on his tendency to yell. Another reviewer from the same site also felt that was the Japanese actor was so unbearable that the English portrayal of the character by Dallas Reid being more tolerable as a result.

Henry Ma of Ka Leo O Hawaii praised Asta's unique powers, courageous nature, and relationships with the diverse cast of the story. Writing for Anime News Network, Rachel Trujillo noted Asta's mentorship relationship with Yami Sukehiro and overcoming his trials and tribulations as highlights of the series. Reviewing Volume 26 of the manga, LaNeysha Campbell praised Asta and Yami's team up against Dante because "the moment makes a touching and impactful statement about Yami and Asta's relationship as mentor and mentee. Even though the panels of the moment use very little dialogue, it still manages to say a lot about how special the bond they share is." Alex Osborn of IGN noted that Asta's personality could be obnoxious, but stated "his diligent and heartfelt pursuit to achieve his dreams is something that I can get behind." Daniel Dockery of Crunchyroll praised how Asta will "always keep pushing and working and trying and yelling."

Dragon Ball creator Akira Toriyama praised the character, stating "I really liked what I saw in Black Clover. The author has a great sense of impact and the protagonist is very charismatic."

In 2021, American rapper Megan Thee Stallion, in her appearance at Hot Ones challenge, spoke a bit about Black Clover and Asta, stating "I just feel like I can relate to him, and any of the other main characters in anime because a lot of people...[T]hey try to count you out...but you train, and you train, and you fight, and you fight and keep proving people wrong. And keep beating the odds. I feel like that's the type of person I am."

In 2022, professional NBA player Daniel Gafford, spoke about how Asta's mantra about never giving up hits him the right way as an athlete. Even when a game is going the wrong way, the pro athlete leans into Asta's tenacity to boost his own morale.
