= Noelle Silva =

Fictional character from Black Clover

- Black Clover character
- Noelle Silva as drawn by Yūki Tabata for Black Clover chapter 96.
- First appearance: Black Clover #4, "The Black Bulls" (2015)
- Created by: Yūki Tabata
- Voiced by: Japanese: Kana Yūki; English: Jill Harris

In-universe information
- Occupation: Magic Knight in the Black Bulls
- Family: Acier Silva (mother); Nozel Silva (brother); Nebra Silva (sister); Solid Silva (brother); Mimosa Vermillion (cousin); Kirsch Vermillion (cousin)

Noelle Silva (Japanese: ノエル・シルヴァ, Hepburn: Noeru Shiruva) is a fictional character of the manga series Black Clover created by Yūki Tabata. A Magic Knight in the Black Bulls, she is a royal of the Clover Kingdom and daughter of the House of Silva who joins the squad alongside Asta. Unable to control her magic despite her lineage, her goal is to make her family acknowledge her.

In the Black Clover anime adaptation, she is voiced by Kana Yūki in Japanese and Jill Harris in English. Her character has received positive reception for her emotional and magical growth throughout the story.

== Concept and creation ==
In September 2017, Yūki Tabata, the author of Black Clover, was asked in an interview if there was a character significantly different from his initial concept of them. Tabata mentioned Noelle, not imagining that she would develop so soon but before he had realized it she was developing alongside Asta, with Tabata happy with the outcome. He would plan for her character to overcome her inferiority complex and awaken to her royal potential through fighting alongside Asta. Her character draws from "The Ugly Duckling", with a bird theme of white feather-frilled clothes, wing-like ornaments in her Valkyrie Armor, and depiction with feathers in manga artwork, and having been mocked in her past.

== Appearances ==
=== In Black Clover ===
Noelle was born to the House of Silva, one of the Clover Kingdom's three royal families. Growing up, she was mocked and bullied by her siblings for causing their mother Acier's death due to her childbirth and for being unable to control her magic. Noelle joins the Black Bulls thanks to Yami Sukehiro's kindness after being rejected from her family's squad. Although reluctant at first due to her pride, she joins them after the squad accepts her in spite of her poor magic control. On a mission to Saussy, Noelle contemplates fleeing when Heath Grice and his men attack the village. The pleas of a young girl gives Noelle the courage to stay, allowing her to harness her magic to form a barrier and help save the villagers. She begins developing romantic feelings for Asta, though she is reluctant to express it.

During the Black Bulls' mission to obtain a magic stone from the Underwater Temple, Noelle has difficulty using her magic to transport the squad underwater, unable to draw power from any happy memories. Through the Black Bulls' encouragement, she remembers the kindness and love they showed her, learning the spell needed for them out of her motivation to help them. At the Underwater Temple, she learns from her new friend Kahono that she has been unconsciously holding herself back out of fear of hurting anyone. She uses her magic offensively for the first time against Vetto when he threatens her friends' lives. However, he regenerates using Forbidden Magic, requiring the other Black Bulls to defeat him after a long battle. During a trip to the Forest of Witches to heal Asta's arm, Noelle is entrusted to stop Fana using her water magic. She falters, remembering her childhood. Asta's encouragement and trust in her give Noelle the confidence needed, helping to defeat the Third Eye member.

Training at a volcano after the Star Festival, Noelle is reunited with Mereoleona, who encourages her to surpass her mother with her own strength. At the Royal Knights Examination, Noelle is placed in a team with Yuno. In the first round, she defeats her brother Solid, showing him her improved magic and asserting that she has been acknowledged by people better than him. She is later accepted into the Royal Knights squad. When the Royal Capital is attacked by the reincarnated elves, she helps save her siblings and is acknowledged by her brother Nozel. Thanks to her motivation, training, and innate magic potential, she gains her Valkyrie Armor spell to defeat the elf threatening her family. In the aftermath of the elf reincarnation, Noelle and the other Black Bulls are assigned to investigate devils. She learns from Coral Peacocks captain Dorothy Unsworth that her mother died from a curse by the devil Megicula which affects anyone who speaks about it, which is why her oldest brother Nozel kept it a secret. The investigations lead the Magic Knights to ally with the Heart Kingdom against the Spade Kingdom, with Noelle training under the Heart Queen Lolopechka for six months.

She battles Vanica Zogratis and is defeated but is saved by the elves of the Midnight Sun and trains with them to master Saint Sage with Undine. She later travels to the Spade Kingdom for a rematch with Vanica and kills Megicula with the help of her brother Nozel. During the battle, she realizes that she is in love with Asta. A year after the Spade Kingdom battle, she tries to help Asta with his battle against Lucius Zogratis but gets trapped by Sister Lily and watches in horror as Asta is supposedly killed. When Lucius invades the Clover Kingdom, she helps her family battle their mother who was brought back as a Paladin. It is later revealed that she formed a contract with the Sea God at the Underwater Temple with Kahono and Kiato's help. She and her siblings are able to defeat their mother after Nebra and Solid apologize to her for their poor treatment.

=== Other media ===
Noelle appears as a playable character in the video game Black Clover: Quartet Knights. She also appears in the anime film Black Clover: Sword of the Wizard King.

== Powers and abilities ==
Noelle is a water mage. Born with incredible magic potential as a royal, she is initially unable to properly control her magic, with it veering to different directions. Through training and facing dangers, she learns to control it to form barriers and later blasts of water. She later gains the spell "Valkyrie Armor", covering her body in a magical armor made of water that lets her control the mana of whatever it touches. After training, she gains a Mermaid Form variant of the armor that increases her power underwater. After Lolopechika is captured, Noelle becomes the new host of the water spirit Undine and is able to use Saint Valkyrie Armor, giving her the power to destroy devils. She later becomes the host of the Sea God at the Underwater Temple giving her even more power. This enhanced power from the Sea God Leviathan grants Noelle yet another new form to her Valkyrie armor, "Valkyrie Armor Dragon Form".

== Reception ==
=== Popularity ===
Noelle has consistently ranked high in the yearly Japanese Black Clover popularity polls, placing ninth in the second poll with 709 votes and fifth in the fourth poll with 1,337 votes. In the fifth poll, she placed first with 80,150 votes.

=== Critical response ===
Daniel Dockery of Crunchyroll praised Noelle's character arc for having her learn to love and accept other people despite their social standings after years of being raised in a hateful, distant family, free herself from a discriminatory thinking, and develop her confidence and magic to become a knight and fighter. He stated that "She is Black Clover's strengths incarnate and the best of her family." Marion De Leon of Toonami Faithful discussed how her moments of weakness highlight her strengths, with her reluctance to hurt people transformed into an active desire to protect others, saying she "has as much of a hero's journey as any male MCs in anime." Writing for Anime News Network, Rachel Trujillo noted Noelle's mentorship relationship with Mereoleona as a highlight of the series. Ivy Rose from Anime Feminist praised Noelle and Mereoleona's relationship for portraying them "not as love interests for the main character, not as sex objects, not as helpless damsels, not even as fierce but one-dimensional warriors, but as fully articulated people."

In his review of Volume 19, Shawn Hacaga of The Fandom Post said "It has been extremely rewarding to see how much she's grown since the start of the series. She has experienced so many terrible things throughout her life. But she managed to persevere!" LaNeysha Campbell praised how, lacking confidence and control over her powers when she was first introduced, Noelle gained more confidence in herself thanks to the positive influence from the Black Bulls. She stated: "In this volume, Noelle goes up against some enemies that have magic that she has never seen before and can hold her own. It is moments like these that continue to impress me with how far Noelle has come as a character." Krishna Mayuri of Otakukart was impressed by her second fight against archenemy Vanica, saying Tabata "gives his characters a human touch rather than making them saints. Noelle is ready to kill Vanica and has no plans of sparing her. This just further makes her a more human character, and fans are entirely loving this."
