= Kana Yūki =

Japanese voice actress & singer

- 優木 かな
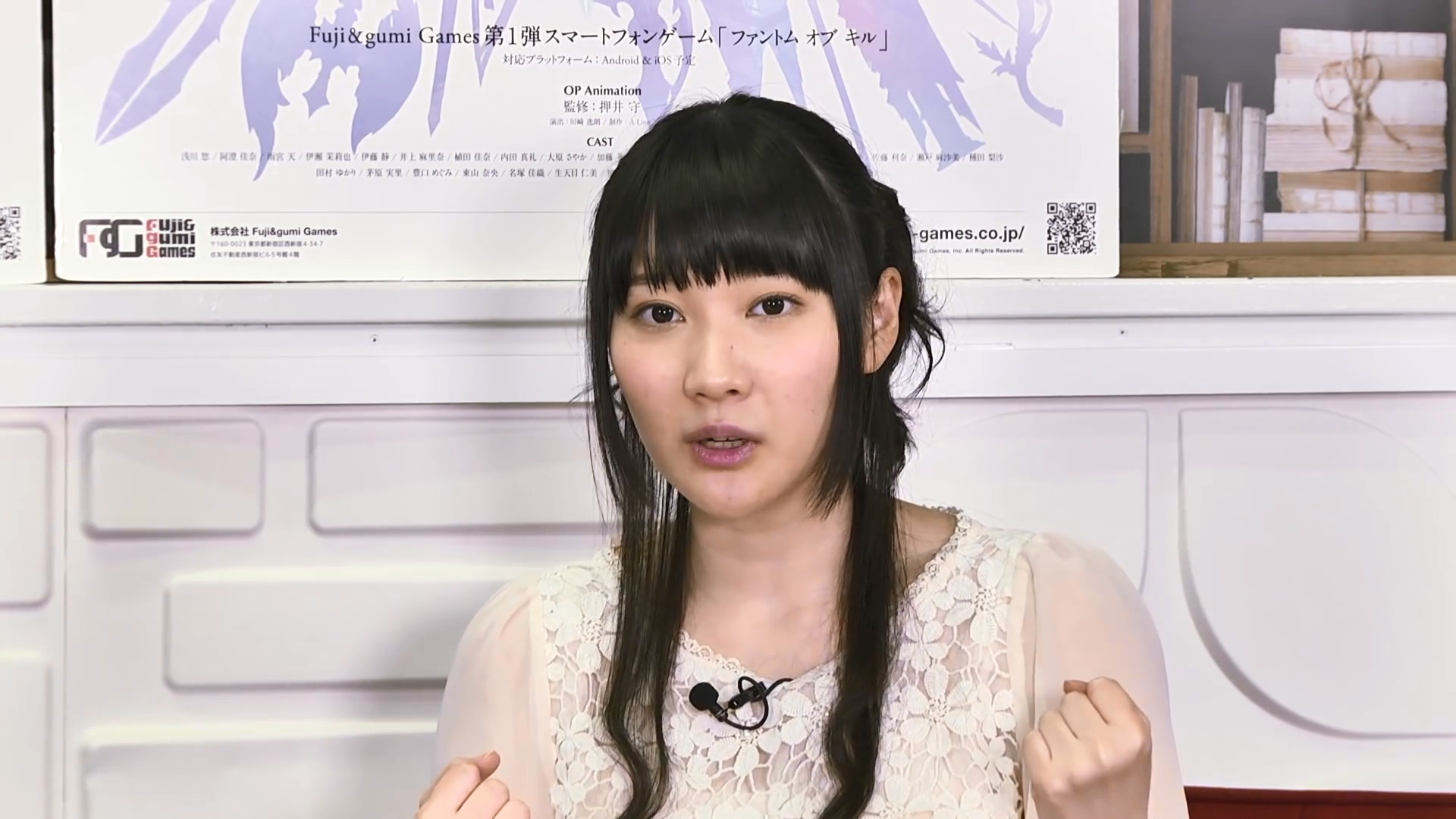
- Born: March 10, 1987 (age 39); Kanagawa Prefecture, Japan
- Occupations: Voice actress; singer
- Years active: 2010–present
- Agent: VIMS
- Website: www.kananote.net

Kana Yūki (優木 かな, Yūki Kana; born March 10, 1987) is a Japanese voice actress and singer from Kanagawa Prefecture. She is affiliated with VIMS.

== Filmography ==
=== Anime ===
2013

- Aoki Hagane no Arpeggio – Student D
- Karneval – Yori's Mother
- Genshiken: Second Generation – Sawawatari

2014

- Brynhildr in the Darkness – Risa Kashiwagi
- Is the Order a Rabbit – Girl B
- Ai Tenchi Muyo! – Hachiko, Inukai
- Bladedance of Elementalers – Rinslet Laurenfrost
- Wolf Girl and Black Prince – Female College Student, female Student, Tsubomi's mother

2015

- Shigatsu wa Kimi no Uso – Female Student
- Tsubu Doll – Tana Mizuki

2016

- Tokyo Ghoul: Pinto – Clerk
- Aikatsu Stars – Miki Katsura
- Shōnen Maid – Rika Sakura
- Keijo!!! – Mai Itoeda
- Girlish Number – Female voice actress, Woman, Woman in Couple

2017

- Recovery of an MMO Junkie – Nao
- Kings Game The Animation – Rina Minami
- Black Clover – Noelle Silva, Acier Silva

2018

- Umamusume: Pretty Derby – Super Creek
- Harukana Receive – Haruka Ōzora

2019

- Bananya and the Curious Bunch – Narrator
- Squishy! Black Clover – Noelle Silva
- Azur Lane – Yorktown, Yukikaze

2022

- Extreme Hearts – Sumika Maehara
- Peter Grill and the Philosopher's Time: Super Extra – Fruitalia Eldriel

2023

- Onimai: I'm Now Your Sister! – Asahi Ōka

2024

- The Strongest Tank's Labyrinth Raids – Lily

2025

- Umamusume: Cinderella Gray – Super Creek

2027

- Otherworldly Munchkin: Let's Speedrun the Dungeon with Only 1 HP! – Charlotte R. Brownia

=== Original net animation ===
2022

- Kakegurui Twin – Moderator

=== Anime films ===
2023

- Black Clover: Sword of the Wizard King – Noelle Silva

=== Video games ===
2012

- Koebura – Igarashi Kyoka

2013

- Idolism – Kagura Yuzuki
- Tokyo 7th Sisters – Asami Miwako

2016

- Girls' Frontline – T-CMS, Kord
- Tagatame no Alchemist (The Alchemist Code) – Mei Fang
- Shadowverse – Arisa

2017

- Fire Emblem Heroes – Nino, Katarina (Japanese version)

2018

- Gal*Gun 2
- Azur Lane – Yorktown, Yukikaze, Concord, Yorktown II
- Black Clover: Quartet Knights – Noelle Silva
- Black Clover: Phantom Knights – Noelle Silva
- Kirara Fantasia – Oozora Haruka
- Princess Connect! Re:Dive – Arisa

2019

- Arknights – Gitano, Myrrh
- Epic Seven – Serila

2020

- Granblue Fantasy – Alspia

2021

- Blue Archive – Hanae Asagao
- DC Super Hero Girls: Teen Power – Poison Ivy
- Revived Witch – Cynethia
- Umamusume: Pretty Derby – Super Creek

2024

- Card-en-Ciel – Yurina Gozu
