= Yuzuriha =

Fictional character from Hell's Paradise: Jigokuraku

- Hell's Paradise: Jigokuraku character
- First appearance: "Hell's Paradise: Jigokuraku Chapter 2"; January 22, 2018
- Last appearance: "Hell's Paradise: Jigokuraku Chapter 127"; January 25, 2021
- Created by: Yuji Kaku
- Voiced by: Japanese; Rie Takahashi; English; Jill Harris

In-universe information
- Nicknames: Yuzuriha of Keishu; Fox; Sumire
- Gender: Female
- Nationality: Japanese

Yuzuriha (Japanese: 杠), often known as Yuzuriha of Keishu (傾主の杠, Keishu no Yuzuriha), is a fictional character of Yuji Kaku's manga series Hell's Paradise: Jigokuraku. Before her death sentence, she was recruited to join an expedition team where she would compete against other death row convicts in acquiring the Elixir of Life for the shogun from an island.

== Creation and conception ==
Manga artist Yuji Kaku developed the characters of Hell's Paradise: Jigokuraku, with the mindset of how conflicted human relationships and modern ethics would function in Japan's Edo period with multiple themes including supernatural and violence. The central characters were designed with backstories that make them relatable to modern audiences, despite being criminals and executioners, in order to make them feel unique within the historical time frame. The character creation for Hell's Paradise stemmed from a simple, core framework: "several pairs of people whose interests aren't aligned [are] thrown into an enclosed space and forced to work together". Kaku talked about how he approached the character designs in an interview with Crunchyroll, noting "Designing characters isn't unpleasant, and I try to express the character's personality through their design. Reality is different, but in manga, I think there's a firm connection between the inside and outside. [I] talked about that with Miura-sensei as well. I deliberately try give important characters strong designs." In the anime adaptation, Yuzuriha is voiced by Rie Takahashi in Japanese, while in English she is voiced by Jill Harris.

== Appearances ==
After accepting an invitation to join an expedition team centered around the retrievement of the Elixir of Life, Yuzuriha was taken to Edo where she is grouped up with other death row criminals. After being given the rundown of the mission, Yuzuriha and the other criminals are ordered to start a massacre until only a remaining few were available to leave for the island. By the end, Yuzuriha becomes one of the ten criminals to survive and depart from the island.

== Reception ==
=== Popularity ===
Yuzuriha became a fan favorite character in the Hell's Paradise series, trending on social media and search queries on Google. In an interview with Crunchyroll, the director for Hell's Paradise Kaori Makita noted "I was very surprised! Yuzuriha is a very attractive girl–just an attractive person generally speaking–but her overwhelming popularity was very surprising indeed. If you remember what Senta said in episode 12, I think Yuzuriha's main charm point is that she lies but she doesn't lie. She might lie to others, but she's always honest with herself. That's one of her main charm points ... and of course her cute visuals as well." Writing for Crunchyroll, Amílcar Trejo Mosquera wrote "At first glance she's a friendly girl, but in reality, she's very ruthless and appears to only look out for herself. A very capable fighter but even better at gathering information and manipulating people with her charms, she's someone you'll prefer to have on your side.

=== Critical response ===
Allyson Johnson writing for But Why Tho? in her review of the sixth episode of the second season wrote "Her element being earth means that she can land effective attacks from a distance, while Gabimaru fights up close to create an opening for her."
