= Yami Sukehiro =

Fictional character from Black Clover

- Black Clover character
- Yami as drawn by Yūki Tabata for Black Clover chapter 50.
- First appearance: Black Clover #2, "The Magic Knights Entrance Exam" (2015)
- Created by: Yūki Tabata
- Voiced by: Japanese: Junichi Suwabe; English: Christopher R. Sabat

In-universe information
- Occupation: Captain of the Black Bulls
- Family: Yami Ichika (sister)

Yami Sukehiro (Japanese: ヤミ・スケヒロ, Hepburn: Yami Sukehiro) is a fictional character of the manga series Black Clover created by Yūki Tabata. Nicknamed the "Lord of Destruction" (破壊神, Hakaishin), he is the captain of the Black Bulls, considered the worst Magic Knight Squad, and recruits Asta. Yami is physically strong and intimidating, threatening anyone who annoys him. Despite his aggression, he serves as a mentor to the Black Bulls, urging them to "surpass their limits" (Japanese: 限界をこえる, Hepburn: genkai o koeru). Yami originated from another country known as the "Land of the Sun" before being shipwrecked in the Clover Kingdom as a teenager.

In the Black Clover anime adaptation, he is voiced by Junichi Suwabe in Japanese and Christopher R. Sabat in English. Yami has been praised for his mentorship and leadership of Asta and his squad as well as his comedic moments.

== Concept and creation ==
In June 2018, in an interview Yūki Tabata, the author of Black Clover, stated that Yami's creation was inspired by Toshiaki Iwashiro, who he had worked under as an assistant. Yami's surname, "Sukehiro", contains the kanji for "night", "appearance", "mediate", and "large".

== Appearances ==
=== In Black Clover ===
Prior to the events of the series, Yami Sukehiro was born in the Land of the Sun as a member of the Yami Clan, assassins loyal to the Ryudo Clan that rule over the region of Goshu. Yami trained by his father to a magic swordsman, using his skills to protect his younger sister Ichika from their father's abuse while befriending the feudal lord's son Ryudo Ryuya. Yami then learns his father is planning a coup and offers him a drug that would draw out his latent power while in a bloodthirsty trance. But Ichika takes the pill instead and slaughters everyone but Yami, who decides to take blame for her while fleeing his homeland via boat. But he gets shipwrecked in the Clover Kingdom, where he was discriminated against for being a foreigner and having dark magic. As a teenager, he became friends with future Black Bulls vice captain Nacht Faust, getting into trouble together. He was then recruited into the magic knight squad Gray Deer by future Wizard King Julius Novachrono, who taught Yami the country's language. After the death of Nacht's twin brother Morgen, Yami's squadmate, he took up smoking in his stead. He then went on to become a captain and form the Black Bulls as a home for fellow misfits like himself, recruiting from the country's shunned starting with Nacht.

Yami first appears in Black Clover at the annual magic knights examination. He is impressed by Asta's physical abilities and intrigued by his anti-magic swords. When Asta does not get any offers from the other captains, Yami tries to intimidate him with his magic power, but Asta remains determined to achieve his dream. Impressed, he recruits Asta into the Black Bulls, as well as Noelle Silva. He assigns Asta and the other Black Bulls to complete missions and tasks. After Noelle reports about kidnapped children at the village of Nairn, Yami has Finral teleport them to help Asta. He then proceeds to fight the Eye of the Midnight Sun leader Licht. As Yami and Licht start to talk, Licht tells the story of how the elves were killed by humans, with Yami retorting how he was a shipwrecked foreigner who beat the people who disliked him up to become a captain. During this, he also teaches Asta how to sense "ki". Before Licht kills them with his strongest spell, Gauche reflects back his attack with his mirror magic. The other captains come as reinforcements, and briefly fight against the Eye of the Midnight Sun's Third Eye before they flee.

The Black Bulls are assigned to retrieve a magic stone from the Underwater Temple. The priest of the temple Gifso makes the squad play a game to gain the stone, with Yami not allowed to participate. The Eye of the Midnight Sun then attack, with Yami unable to because of Gifso's magic that was used to set the game rules. When Vetto is about to self-destruct after being defeated by the Black Bulls, Yami arrives, having broken through Gifso's magic with a new spell. He then uses this new spell, which cuts through dimensions, to stop and kill Vetto. Yami holds a small memorial for Vetto. He and Asta briefly discuss Vetto's despair about his people's massacre, but Yami tells Asta to not think about too much and just chase his dream. Later, Yami confronts William Vangeance, suspecting him to be Licht due to their similar ki. However, he is proven wrong when Vangeance takes off his mask.

After the royal knights tournament, with Finral gravely injured by his half-brother Langris, the Golden Dawn vice captain, Yami is invited to the Golden Dawn headquarters to meet with Vangeance. Vangeance, who is the host of Licht's soul, instead meets with Julius, with the two fighting and Julius sacrificing himself to save the kingdom. Yami arrives, promising to protect the kingdom in Julius's stead. With the elves reincarnated, Yami briefly fights a possessed Charlotte Roselei and, with captain Jack the Ripper and Finral, defeats a possessed Langris. At the Shadow Palace, the devil Zagred reveals himself to be the true mastermind of the elf massacre. Yami uses Mana Zone to bisect Zagred's body, with Yuno helping Asta to destroy the devil's heart. Yami later finds Julius, who is alive but now a powerless child, having come back to life after sealing time in a spell. When Asta and Secre are tried by the Magic Parliament for the elf reincarnation, Yami leads the Black Bulls to crash the trial, where he formally recruits Secre and demands they be released. The situation is calmed by Julius, who decrees that Asta will be in the squad's custody and they will be assigned to investigate devils.

Six months after the magic knights ally with the Heart Kingdom against the Spade Kingdom, Dante of the Dark Triad comes to the Black Bulls' base to abduct Yami, whose dark magic is needed to form the Tree of Qliphoth to bring devils into the human world, fighting the Black Bulls there. Yami arrives to the base after a captains' meeting. Unable to defeat Dante alone due to his body magic's regeneration, Yami acknowledges Asta and asks for his help. Together, the two barely manage to defeat Dante, with Yami passing Asta his katana during the fight to land the final blow. However, Zenon arrives and takes Dante and Yami with him.

During the Spade Kingdom Invasion, Yami is encased in a tomb alongside William Vengeance where they are being used to connect the underworld to the human world. The Dark Triad's goal is to open up the gates and take over the world by using high-ranking devils. Several gates end up opening and even after the Dark Triad is defeated, Lucifero ends up manifesting and engulfing both captives. Asta ends up using Yami's sword to deliver a slash that cuts the manifestation open, finally freeing the captain. Once he is freed, Yami is left severely wounded as a result of the prolonged ritual use of his body and magical drain he had to endure. He is healed by Grey, who realizes that his body has changed and is akin to Asta's devil possessed body. He then participates in the battle against Lucifero, who fatally wounds him and Nacht by the end of the battle. Yuno teleports Mimosa to heal him who then relies on Charmy to recover her magic power.

He later participates in the battle against Lucius when he invades the Clover Kingdom and is shocked to see Morgen brought back as a Paladin. He struggles against Morgen until he is saved by Nacht and Ichika.

=== Other media ===
Yami appears as a playable character in the video game Black Clover: Quartet Knights. He also appears in the anime film Black Clover: Sword of the Wizard King.

== Powers and abilities ==
Yami uses the magical attribute of darkness to both generate and manipulate it at will. Notable characteristics of it include its ability to draw in other kinds of magic along with specific applications of spatial interference. However, due to the inherent slowness of his magic, he uses it as reinforcement magic to increase his physical abilities and coats it on his katana to boost the offensive capabilities.

Notable spells include Dark Coated Dimension Slash, which can bypass conventional durability by targeting space itself, and the Equinox variant, which does the same thing but with a substantially better range.

Yami later learns to use the high-level technique Mana Zone, taking control of the surrounding mana to increase the range and power of his spells. Including imbuing a spell called Black Moon which acts as a selective black hole that absorbs and thus nullifies the spells of opponents. He would also refine it in order the more potent Death Thrust, by condensing Mana Zone to a singular tiny point.

With his dark magic's ability to affect the underworld and later being revealed to be integrally linked to said realm, he is categorized as an Arcane Stage mage.

Additionally, Yami had learnt rudimentary Ki applications as an original inhabitant of his prior home country Land of the Sun in order to sense the life force of other living beings around him. It also enables pre-cognitive sensory abilities by reading the flow of Ki in mages and thus predicting individual actions.

After being encased in the Tree of Qliphoth ritual during the Spade Kingdom Arc, Yami's body is fundamentally changed to be similar to Asta's in its ability to be possessed by Devils. During the final arc, Yami is fatally wounded and is given a demon soul pill by Ichika. Demon soul pills in the past have never resulted in the user being able to stay sane and were thought to increase one's urge to kill. However, due to the changes to his body, Yami is able to utilize its true ability to boost his physical abilities. This changes his appearance by adding horns to his head, white streaks in his hair, and large prayer beads around his neck.

Yami's dark magic works well with other dark magic as well as shadow magic, creating combo spells that increase its effectiveness and complexity.

== Reception ==
=== Popularity ===
Yami has consistently ranked highly in the yearly Japanese Black Clover popularity polls, placing second in the second poll with 1,967 votes and second in the fourth poll with 3,503 votes. In the fifth poll, he placed seventh with 44,884 votes. His fight against Licht was nominated for "Best Fight Scene" at the 3rd Crunchyroll Anime Awards in 2018. Asta and Yami's fight with Dante was also listed as the sixth best anime fight from 2021 by Crunchyroll.

=== Critical response ===
Daniel Dockery from Crunchyroll praised how Yami "was (and is) infinitely cool, a father figure whose approval means so much to his team. The confidence that he has in each of them is inspiring because he sees so much potential – potential that the Clover Kingdom society seems eager to trample down and hide." Writing for Anime News Network, Rachel Trujillo mentioned Asta's mentorship relationship with Yami Sukehiro as a highlight of the series, saying "The defining moment of their relationship comes when Yami passes Asta his katana during their battle against Dante, which represents not only a culmination of their time spent together as mentor and student, but also the ultimate sign of trust from a captain to his subordinate." LaNeysha Campbell, in her review of Volume 26, praised Asta and Yami's team up against Dante because "the moment makes a touching and impactful statement about Yami and Asta's relationship as mentor and mentee. Even though the panels of the moment use very little dialogue, it still manages to say a lot about how special the bond they share is." Philip Van der Walt from Comic Watch called Yami "simultaneously one of the most badass and comedic characters in the series, and never misses the chance to inspire his team to keep improving and push past their limits." Anjali Mehta spoke positively of Yami's comedic moments, bringing up his penchant for violence, tactlessness, and bullying of his squad. Jack Doyle of The Mary Sue, when discussing the possibility of his death, called Yami "dope, and we don't like it when bad things happen to dope people."
