= Black Clover: Sword of the Wizard King =

2023 film directed by Ayataka Tanemura

- Theatrical release poster
- Kanji: ブラッククローバー 魔法帝の剣
- Revised Hepburn: Burakku Kurōbā: Mahōtei no Ken
- Directed by: Ayataka Tanemura
- Screenplay by: Johnny Onda; Ai Orii
- Story by: Yūki Tabata
- Based on: Black Clover by Yūki Tabata
- Produced by: Ryuu Hashimoto; Maiko Isotani; Tomohiko iwase; Naomi Komatsu; Hideyuki Yamazaki; Shouta Iida
- Music by: Minako Seki
- Production company: Studio Pierrot
- Distributed by: Shochiku
- Release date: June 16, 2023
- Running time: 110 minutes
- Country: Japan
- Language: Japanese

Black Clover: Sword of the Wizard King (Japanese: ブラッククローバー 魔法帝の剣, Hepburn: Burakku Kurōbā: Mahōtei no Ken) is a Japanese animated fantasy action film directed by Ayataka Tanemura and produced by Pierrot. Based on the shōnen manga series Black Clover by Yūki Tabata, the film was released in Japanese theaters by Shochiku on June 16, 2023. It received an international streaming release on Netflix the same day. The events of the animated movie take place during the 6-month gap right before the Heart Kingdom Joint Struggle Arc.

== Plot ==
Asta, a boy born with no magic in a world where magic is everything, and his rival Yuno, a genius mage chosen by the legendary 4-leaf Grimoire, have together fought a number of powerful enemies to prove their power beyond adversity and aim for the top mage "Wizard King".

Conrad Leto, the former predecessor of Julius Novachrono, once commanded the respect of the people in the Clover Kingdom. However, he unexpectedly turned against the kingdom and was subsequently sealed away by Julius himself. Now, Conrad has resurfaced and he wields the "Imperial Sword" and seeks to destroy the Clover Kingdom and bring forth a new era where equality prevails by destroying all and reviving only those whom he considers deserving of a place in his envisioned society.

He uses the power of the sword to revive three wizard kings of the past: Edward Avalaché, Princia Funnybunny, and Jester Garandaros, who share the same vision as him, in order to achieve his goal.

== Voice cast ==
Character	Japanese	English
Asta	Gakuto Kajiwara	Dallas Reid
Yuno Grinberryall	Nobunaga Shimazaki	Micah Solusod
Noelle Silva	Kana Yūki	Jill Harris
Yami Sukehiro	Junichi Suwabe	Christopher Sabat
Julius Novachrono	Toshiyuki Morikawa	Robert McCollum
Conrad Leto	Toshihiko Seki	Chris Niosi
Edward Avalaché	Hōchū Ōtsuka	Steve Blum
Princia Funnybunny	Miyuki Sawashiro	Mara Junot
Jester Garandaros	Fumiya Takahashi	Benjamin Diskin
Millie Maxwell	Marie Iitoyo	Tia Ballard
Vanessa Enoteca	Nana Mizuki	Lydia Mackay
Finral Roulacase	Jun Fukuyama	Brandon McInnis
Secre Swallowtail	Ayane Sakura	Monica Rial
William Vangeance	Daisuke Ono	Jessie James Grelle
Fuegoleon Vermillion	Katsuyuki Konishi	J. Michael Tatum
Mereoleona Vermillion	Junko Minagawa	Monica Rial
Nozel Silva	Kohsuke Toriumi	Ricco Fajardo
Jack the Ripper	Daisuke Namikawa	Justin Cook
Charlotte Roselei	Yu Kobayashi	Colleen Clinkenbeard
Rill Boismortier	Natsuki Hanae	Derick Snow
Dorothy Unsworth	Mariya Ise	Jad Saxton
Kaiser Granvorka	Kenichirou Matsuda	Mark Stoddard
Magna Swing	Genki Muro	Ian Sinclair
Luck Voltia	Ayumu Murase	Justin Briner
Gauche Adlai	Satoshi Hino	Dave Trosko
Charmy Pappitson	Kiyono Yasuno	Sarah Wiedenheft
Grey	Minami Takahashi	Megan Shipman
Gordon Agrippa	Kenichirou Matsuda	Mike McFarland
Zora Ideale	Hikaru Midorikawa	Johnny Yong Bosch
Henry Legolant	Mitsuki Saiga	Stephen Fu
Mimosa Vermillion	Asuka Nishi	Bryn Apprill
Klaus Lunettes	Takuma Terashima	Aaron Roberts
Marx Francois	Yoshitaka Yamaya	Aaron Dismuke
Sekke Bronzazza	Ryota Osaka	Garret Storms
Leopold Vermillion	Kenn	Austin Tindle
Sally	Minami Tsuda	Trina Nishimura
Bell	Aya Uchida	Tia Ballard
Liebe	Nobuhiko Okamoto	Bryce Papenbrook
Nacht Faust	Hiro Shimono	Max Mittelman
Father Orsi	Kazuki Nakao	Brian Mathis

== Production and release ==
An anime film adaptation of Black Clover was announced in Weekly Shōnen Jump in March 2021. On March 13, 2022, in the 15th Issue of Weekly Shōnen Jump, it was announced that the anime film will open in 2023 with Yūki Tabata serving as the chief supervisor and original character designer. In October 2022, it was announced that the film would feature a returning staff and cast from the television series, with Ayataka Tanemura directing, Pierrot producing the animation, Johnny Onda and Ai Orii writing the scripts, and Itsuko Takeda designing the characters. The film was initially set to be released simultaneously in Japanese theaters by Shochiku and digitally on Netflix internationally on March 31, 2023, but was later postponed to June 16 of the same year due to the COVID-19 pandemic affecting its production.

On April 29, the movie's official twitter account announced that the production for the film has been completed.

== Music ==
In October 2022, it was revealed that Minako Seki would be composing the music for the anime film. On December 17, 2022, at Shueisha's Jump Festa '23 event, a new trailer for the film was streamed on Shonen Jump's YouTube Channels with an English subtitled version being streamed on Netflix's YouTube channel. The short trailer revealed and previewed the theme song for the upcoming movie "Here I Stand" by Treasure.

=== Reception ===
A single album including the theme song for the movie "Here I Stand" as well as the Ballad version of the 13th Ending OST for the TV anime, "Beautiful"; titled "Here I stand" was released on 29 March 2023. On its debut week the single album, ranked 2nd on Oricon's weekly single chart and sold 235,347 copies on its debut week generating ¥464.4 million (approx. US$3.51 million).

The song also ranked 1st on Japan Billboard and Line Music's weekly ranking chart in its debut week.

== Marketing ==
In March 2021, a key visual featuring Asta was released through the official Twitter account, with further details to be revealed at later date. In December 2021, at Shueisha's Jump Festa '22 event, a New Key visual for the anime film was released, this time featuring Yuno. In March 2022, short 30-second promotional video for the anime film was streamed on Jump Comic's official YouTube Channel.

== Novelization ==
On April 10, 2023, two novelizations of the series were announced.

== Reception ==
The film was released on Netflix on June 16; from June 16 to June 18 the film gained 6.4 million views and was the second-most watched non-English movie on the platform that week from June 19 to 25 the film gained another 4.1 million views and was the third-most watched non-English movie on the platform that week; from June 26 to July 2 the film gained yet another 1.2 million views and was the eighth-most watched non-English movie on the platform that week.

According to Netflix engagement report, "What we watched", the film was watched for a total of 21.5 million hours from January 2023 to June 2023, 10.5 million hours from July 2023 to December 2023, and another 8.6 million hours from January 2024 to June 2024.

On Rotten Tomatoes, the film received an 86% critic rating based on seven reviews with an average score of 5.8/10.

At the 8th Crunchyroll Anime Awards in 2024, Black Clover: Sword of the Wizard King was nominated for Best Film.
