= Black Clover =

Japanese manga series

- First tankōbon volume cover, featuring Asta (front) and Yuno (back)

ブラッククローバー (Burakku Kurōbā)
- Genre: Adventure; Fantasy
- Manga
- Written by: Yūki Tabata
- Published by: Shueisha
- English publisher: NA: Viz Media
- Imprint: Jump Comics
- Magazine: Weekly Shōnen Jump (February 16, 2015 – August 21, 2023); Jump Giga (December 25, 2023 – May 1, 2026)
- English magazine: NA: Weekly Shonen Jump
- Original run: February 16, 2015 – May 1, 2026
- Volumes: 38
Further information
Novel
Black Clover: Abareushi no Sho
Written by	Johnny Onda
Illustrated by	Yūki Tabata
Published by	Shueisha
Imprint	Jump J-Books
Published	August 4, 2016
Original video animation
Directed by	Takashi Noto
Produced by	Ryōsuke Mori
Written by	Takamitsu Kōno
Music by	Yūya Mori
Studio	Xebec Zwei
Released	November 27, 2016
Runtime	27 minutes
Novel
Black Clover: Kishidan no Sho
Written by	Johnny Onda
Illustrated by	Yūki Tabata
Published by	Shueisha
Imprint	Jump J-Books
Published	October 4, 2017
Manga
Asta-kun Mahōtei e no Michi
Written by	Setta Kobayashi
Published by	Shueisha
Magazine	Saikyō Jump
Original run	February 2, 2018 – April 1, 2021
Volumes	3
Manga
Black Clover Gaiden: Quartet Knights
Written by	Yumiya Tashiro
Published by	Shueisha
Magazine	Shōnen Jump+
Original run	October 7, 2018 – April 12, 2020
Volumes	6
Novel
Black Clover: Yuno no Sho
Written by	Johnny Onda
Illustrated by	Yūki Tabata
Published by	Shueisha
Imprint	Jump J-Books
Published	October 4, 2019
Video game
Black Clover: Quartet Knights
Developer	Ilinx
Publisher	Bandai Namco Entertainment
Genre	Action
Platform	PlayStation 4, Microsoft Windows
Released	JP: September 13, 2018; NA: September 14, 2018; EU: September 14, 2018; AU: September 14, 2018
Video game
Black Clover: Phantom Knights
Publisher	Bandai Namco Entertainment
Genre	Kingdom Defense RPG
Platform	iOS, Android
Released	JP: November 14, 2018; US: January 16, 2020
- Anime television series
- Black Clover (2017–present)
- Anime film
- Black Clover: Sword of the Wizard King (2023)
- icon

Black Clover (Japanese: ブラッククローバー, Hepburn: Burakku Kurōbā) is a Japanese manga series written and illustrated by Yūki Tabata. It started in Shueisha's shōnen manga magazine Weekly Shōnen Jump in February 2015. The series ran in the magazine until August 2023, after which it moved to Jump Giga in December of that same year and finished in May 2026. Its chapters were collected in 38 tankōbon volumes. Set in a world where people are born with the ability to use magic, the story follows Asta, a young boy without any magic power who is given a rare grimoire that grants him anti-magic abilities. With his fellow mages from the Black Bulls, Asta plans to become the next Wizard King.

The manga was first adapted into an original video animation (OVA) by Xebec Zwei, released in 2017. A 170-episode anime television series adaptation produced by Pierrot aired on TV Tokyo from October 2017 to March 2021; a second season premiered in October 2026. An anime film, titled Black Clover: Sword of the Wizard King, premiered simultaneously in Japanese theaters and internationally on Netflix in June 2023.

By September 2026, the manga had over 25 million copies in circulation worldwide.

== Plot ==
The series focuses on Asta, a young orphan who is left to be raised in an orphanage in a rural village alongside his fellow orphan, Yuno. While everyone is born with the ability to utilize mana in the form of magical power, Asta was born without mana, and thus has no way to use magic. Instead, he focuses on physical strength. Conversely, Yuno was born as a prodigy with immense magical power and the talent to control wind magic.

Motivated by a desire to become the next Wizard King, an authority figure second to the king of Clover Kingdom, the two youths developed a friendly rivalry. Yuno obtains a legendary four-leaf grimoire held by the kingdom's first Wizard King. The four-leaf grimoire is a rare grimoire, only given to the most immense mages. Asta, despite his lack of magic, obtained an enigmatic five-leaf grimoire that contains mysterious elf swords and a bodiless member of the Devil race who utilizes rare anti-magic. Afterwards, Asta and Yuno each join a Magic Knight squad as the first step to fulfill their ambitions.

Asta joins the Black Bulls under Yami Sukehiro alongside Noelle Silva, while Yuno becomes a member of the Golden Dawn. They embark on various adventures while contending with an extremist group called the Eye of the Midnight Sun, whose leadership is manipulated by a Devil in avenging an injustice committed against the Elves by the Clover Kingdom at the time of its founding. The Magic Knights then face the Dark Triad of the Spade Kingdom, with Asta and Yuno learning of their Devils' influence on their lives and of the Dark Triad's plan to fully manifest the Devils into their world. Then the Magic Knights face the Dark Triad's eldest sibling, Lucius Zogratis, who wants to create his own perfect world.

== Production ==
Manga author Yūki Tabata started in the manga industry at the age of 20 and worked as an assistant for seven years before his science fiction one-shot Hungry Joker was briefly serialized in the Shueisha magazine Weekly Shōnen Jump for 24 chapters from November 12, 2012, to May 13, 2013, before being canceled. Tabata considered this manga a failure which he attributed largely to its quiet and dark-natured main character, who was very unlike the author himself. After its cancellation his friends advised him to develop an energetic, happy-go-lucky protagonist that more closely resembled Tabata and he began working on the fantasy-themed one-shot for Black Clover. After its publication, he was assigned a new editor (Tatsuhiko Katayama) and Shueisha picked up the series for full serialization.

The weekly production process for Black Clover involved Tabata consulting with Katayama for the first few days on the thumbnails of the chapter then spending the remaining days composing the actual art. Tabata credited himself for coming up with a rough outline and ending for the chapter while Katayama aided him in filling in its content and making corrections. Early in the series the artist claimed to only sleep an average of three hours per night due to stress, but after the anime adaptation of Black Clover began airing he was able to increase this to six hours per night. As of at least the seventh volume of Black Clover, he did not utilize digital tools in his drafting, opting for traditional "analog" inking and toning by hand. Tabata stayed motivated during the manga's long run due to his readers looking forward to each week's chapter. Despite the fast pace of most chapters, the author expressed a desire to occasionally create slower yet still satisfying stories. The dark fantasy seinen series Berserk by Kentaro Miura was a heavy influence on Tabata. He wanted to craft a shōnen equivalent of Berserk while also taking inspiration from other fantasy properties such as Dragon Quest: The Adventure of Dai, The Lord of the Rings, Harry Potter, and the films of Guillermo del Toro. Tabata professed to not be a big fan of fantasy role-playing video games like Dragon Quest or Final Fantasy and used the few fantasy movies he did watch as reference material. To give Black Clover's world a European look, Tabata researched photograph books for sets and locations and documented various weapons, clothing, and buildings.

Tabata stated he enjoyed both writing the manga's script and illustrating its battle scenes, particularly in magnifying his characters' movements and making the action more dynamic. For this latter aspect, he took ideas from the shōnen fighting manga Dragon Ball by Akira Toriyama. Tabata recounted he was inspired to become a manga artist after seeing the Dragon Ball Z anime series as a child then learning it was an adaptation of Toriyama's work. He stated that he was also a fan of other shōnen series, such as YuYu Hakusho by Yoshihiro Togashi and Bleach by Tite Kubo. Tabata wished to create a diverse cast of archetypical characters with opposing attributes. He modeled the characters Asta and Charmy Pappitson after himself and his wife respectively. He admitted in the manga's fourth volume that Charmy was his favorite character to draw. He chose names for characters by looking up words he found interesting in dictionaries of various languages. He found that an important aspect of character design in Black Clover was giving them traits that make them easy to remember for the reader. He also wanted to "feel good" drawing them, would revise the characters if he was getting frustrated, and strived to improve on balancing the attention each one gets during the course of the story. Once the characters were made, Tabata decided on their magic abilities based on their personalities and whatever magic would fit the current events of the plot.

== Media ==
=== Manga ===
Written and illustrated by Yūki Tabata, Black Clover started its serialization in Shueisha's shōnen manga anthology Weekly Shōnen Jump on February 16, 2015. In April 2022, it was announced that the series would enter a three-month hiatus to prepare it for its final arc. The series finished its run in Weekly Shōnen Jump on August 21, 2023, and resumed in Jump Giga on December 25 of the same year. The series finished with three chapters published in Jump Giga on May 1, 2026. Shueisha collected its chapters in 38 tankōbon volumes, released from June 4, 2015, to August 4, 2026.

On February 9, 2015, Viz Media announced that they would publish the first three chapters of the series in their Weekly Shonen Jump digital magazine as part of their "Jump Start" program in North America. On March 30, 2015, they announced that the series would join their weekly lineup, beginning with the fourth chapter on April 6, and publishing at an accelerated rate until the chapters were current with Japan. Plans to release the series in print were announced during their panel at New York Comic Con on October 9, 2015. Shueisha began to simulpublish the series in English on the app and website Manga Plus in February 2019.

==== Spin-offs ====
A gag manga spin-off by Setta Kobayashi, titled Asta-kun Mahōtei e no Michi (アスタくん魔法帝への道; "Asta's Journey to Wizard King"), was serialized in Shueisha's Saikyō Jump from February 2, 2018, to April 1, 2021. Shueisha collected its chapters in three tankōbon volume, released from January 4, 2019, to July 2, 2021.

On September 30, 2018, a manga based on the video game Black Clover: Quartet Knights, illustrated by Yumiya Tashiro, launched on the Shōnen Jump+ app on October 7, 2018, and finished on April 12, 2020. Its chapters were collected in six tankōbon volumes, released from January 4, 2019, to October 2, 2020.

=== Novels ===
Three novels written by Johnny Onda have been released under the Jump J-Books imprint. The first, Black Clover: Abareushi no Sho (ブラッククローバー 暴牛の書, Burakku Kurōbā Bōgyū no Sho; "Black Clover: Stubborn Bull Book"), was released on August 4, 2016; the second, Black Clover: Kishidan no Sho (ブラッククローバー 騎士団の書, Burakku Kurōbā Kishidan no Sho; "Black Clover: Order of Knights Book"), was released on October 4, 2017; and the third, Black Clover: Yuno no Sho (ブラッククローバー ユノの書, Burakku Kurōbā Yuno no Sho; "Black Clover: Book of Yuno"), was released on October 4, 2019. A novel adaptation of the film Black Clover: Sword of the Wizard King, authored by Atarō Kuma with Johnny Onda in charge of the scenario, was released on June 9, 2023.

=== Anime ===
==== Original video animation ====
An original video animation (OVA) adaptation, produced by Xebec Zwei, premiered at the 2016 Jump Festa on November 27, 2016. It was later released on DVD on May 2, 2017, bundled with a limited edition of the manga's eleventh volume.

==== Television series ====
A 170-episode anime television series adaptation, produced by Studio Pierrot, was broadcast on TV Tokyo from October 3, 2017, to March 30, 2021.

In July 2025, at Anime Expo, it was announced that the series would receive a second season, also produced by Pierrot. It premiered on October 3, 2026.

==== Film ====
An anime film, titled Black Clover: Sword of the Wizard King, premiered on June 16, 2023.

=== Video games ===
At Jump Festa 2017, a video game, titled Black Clover: Quartet Knights, was announced for a 2018 release on PlayStation 4 and PC. It was developed by Ilinx and published by Bandai Namco. It was released in Japan on September 13, 2018, while the western release was on September 14 of the same year.

On April 22, 2018, a mobile game called Black Clover: Phantom Knights (ブラッククローバー 夢幻の騎士団, Burakku Kurōbā: Mugen no Kishidan) was announced. It was released in Japan on November 14, 2018. On December 6, 2019, Bandai Namco Entertainment announced that the game would be released on January 16, 2020. On December 9, 2020, Bandai Namco Entertainment closed its servers and removed the game from all iOS and Android mobile app stores worldwide.

Asta is featured as a playable character in the Weekly Shōnen Jump crossover game Jump Force.

On December 19, 2021, during Jump Festa 2022, a mobile game was announced. Titled Black Clover Mobile: Rise of the Wizard King (ブラッククローバーモバイル 魔法帝への道, Burakku Kurōbā Mobairu Mahōtei e no Michi) and developed by Vic Game Studios, it was originally announced to be released sometime in 2022; however, it was ultimately released on May 25, 2023; it is set to end service globally on August 21, 2025. The band Glay contributed two songs to the game; "Genkai Toppa" (限界突破, "Limit Break") and "Pianista".

Another mobile game, Black Clover: The Road to the Wizard King – The Opening of Fate (ブラッククローバーモバイル 魔法帝への道 The Opening of Fate), developed by South Korean company Vic Game Studios, was released on May 25, 2023. The game has made roughly $2 million on iOS devices, and $800,000 on Android devices, across both Japanese and Korean servers.

Outfits for Asta, Noelle, and Yuno became available in Fortnite starting October 3, 2026.

=== Stage play ===
A stage play adaptation was announced in June 2023. It starred Keisuke Ueda as Asta, Naoki Takeshi as Yuno, and Arisa Komiya as Noelle Silva. The stage play ran through September 14–18, 2023, at Theatre 1010 in Tokyo and through September 22–24 at Kanagawa Arts Theatre.

== Reception ==
In 2016, Black Clover ranked ninth on the second Next Manga Award, presented by Kadokawa Corporation's Da Vinci magazine and Niconico streaming website; in the same year, the series ranked third on the "Nationwide Bookstore Employees' Recommended Comics" by the Honya Club website in 2016.

Tokyo-based dispatched labor company Staff Service included the series on a list of three manga series about protagonists who struggle to overcome their own weakness and self-doubt, recommended for low self-confidence people.

=== Sales ===
Volume 1 reached 23rd place on the weekly Oricon manga charts, with 38,128 copies sold; volume 2 reached seventeenth place, with 61,918 copies; volume 3 also reached seventeenth place, with 80,462 copies; volume 4 reached thirteenth place, with 93,866 copies; volume 5 reached fifteenth place, with 108,503 copies; and volume 6 reached eleventh place, with 118,783 copies. By December 2017, the manga had over 4.8 million copies in circulation; it had over 5.5 million copies in circulation by February 2018; over 7 million copies in circulation by January 2019; over 12 million copies in circulation by March 2021; over 15 million copies in circulation by May 2021; over 16 million copies in circulation by December 2021; over 17 million copies in circulation by June 2022; over 18 million copies in circulation by November 2022; over 19 million copies in circulation by June 2023; over 24 million copies in circulation by September 2025; over 24.5 million copies in circulation by June 2026; and over 25 million copies in circulation by September 2026.

The series ranked 48th on Rakuten's Top 100 Best Selling Digital Manga of 2019; it ranked 47th in 2020; 50th in 2021; and 47th in the first half of 2022.

Black Clover: Quartet Knights had over 300,000 copies in circulation by October 2020.

In the United States, the manga sold 204,620 copies in 2021, and 223,163 copies in 2022, while on NPD BookScan's top-selling authors in the country for each year, manga author Yūki Tabata ranked 45th and 39th, respectively.

In France, the manga had sold over 300,000 copies by July 2018, and over 2 million copies by December 2023. It had sold 430,000 copies in Germany by November 2023.

=== Critical reception ===
When reviewing the series for ComicsAlliance, Tom Speelman described the premise as "what if Harry Potter was a knight and also kinda dumb?" He recommended it for fans of Naruto and Fairy Tail, noting its similarities to the former series as well as to Bleach. He praised the author's ability to invigorate stock characters. Henry Ma of Ka Leo O Hawaii praised the series' humor and art, noting that the latter was "very nice" and was similar to Fairy Tail. Danica Davidson of Otaku USA noted that the first volume showed promise and recommended it for fans of action/adventure shonen manga. Matthew Warner from The Fandom Post, in his review of Volume 1, stated "With a likable enough main cast and a seemingly solid world, this volume gets the series off to a nice start."

Leroy Douresseaux of Comic Book Bin said that the story reminds him of some of his favorite shonen manga and has an intriguing backstory and internal mythology, calling it "one of the best new series of the year for young readers" and giving it an "A" rating. Dale Bashir of IGN Southeast Asia praised the series for its fast and engaging pacing, action sequences, and presentation of female characters on equal grounds compared to their male counterparts, calling it the "perfect encapsulation of the strengths and weaknesses of the shonen genre as a whole." However, not all critics were positive, with a board of comic book writers at San Diego Comic-Con listing the manga as one of the worst from 2016.

=== Accolades ===
Year	Award	Category	Recipient	Result	Ref.
2020	2020 ComicBook.com Golden Issue Award	Best Manga	Black Clover	Nominated	
2021	Manga Passion Award 2021	Best Continuing Series	Black Clover	7th Place	
2021	Oricon Charts	Mid-year Sales Ranking by Work	"Grandeur" by Snow Man	1st place	
2021	Oricon Charts	Annual Sales Ranking by Work	"Grandeur" by Snow Man	1st place	
2021	World Music Awards	Best Selling Japanese Single	"Grandeur" by Snow Man	Won	
2022	36th Japan Gold Disc Award	Single of the Year	"Grandeur" by Snow Man	Won	
2022	36th Japan Gold Disc Award	Best 5 Singles	"Grandeur" by Snow Man	Won	
