= Jump Festa =

Anime and manga convention in Tokyo, Japan

- Official logo of Jump Festa featuring its mascot Kaizo-kun
- Location: Tokyo
- Country: Japan
- Inaugurated: December 18, 1999; 26 years ago
- Organizer: Shueisha
- Website: www.jumpfesta.com

Jump Festa (Japanese: ジャンプフェスタ, Hepburn: Janpu Fesuta) is an annual manga and anime fan convention in Tokyo, Japan. It is organized by Shueisha, publisher of the various Jump anthologies, with Jump Festa focusing specifically on the Shōnen manga magazines such as Weekly Shōnen Jump, Jump Square, V Jump, Saikyō Jump and Shōnen Jump+. The exposition was started in 1999, and is held for two days in December with over 100,000 people attending every year. New manga, anime, films, games, and merchandise are introduced during this event. Manga artists of popular current and former Jump series are often on hand, and many of them have panels where they answer questions. The festival's mascot is named Kaizo-kun (KAIZOくん) and was designed by Akira Toriyama.

Although the focus of the event is around Shueisha's Jump properties, game designers, such as Bandai Namco Entertainment, Capcom, and Square Enix, have attended the event and announced new games and debuted trailers, gameplay footage, and game demos.

== Event history ==
Dates	Location	Atten.
December 18–19, 1999	Tokyo Big Sight; Tokyo, Japan	
December 23–24, 2000	Makuhari Messe; Tokyo, Japan	
December 22–23, 2001	Makuhari Messe; Tokyo, Japan	
December 21–22, 2002	Makuhari Messe; Tokyo, Japan	
December 20–21, 2003	Makuhari Messe; Tokyo, Japan	
December 18–19, 2004	Makuhari Messe; Tokyo, Japan	
December 17–18, 2005	Makuhari Messe; Tokyo, Japan	
December 16–17, 2006	Makuhari Messe; Tokyo, Japan	
December 22–23, 2007	Makuhari Messe; Tokyo, Japan	
December 20–21, 2008	Makuhari Messe; Tokyo, Japan	
December 19–20, 2009	Makuhari Messe; Tokyo, Japan	
December 18–19, 2010	Makuhari Messe; Tokyo, Japan	165,625
December 17–18, 2011	Makuhari Messe; Tokyo, Japan	163,000
December 22–23, 2012	Makuhari Messe; Tokyo, Japan	
December 21–22, 2013	Makuhari Messe; Tokyo, Japan	145,000
December 20–21, 2014	Makuhari Messe; Tokyo, Japan	
December 19–20, 2015	Makuhari Messe; Tokyo, Japan	
December 17–18, 2016	Makuhari Messe; Tokyo, Japan	
December 16–17, 2017	Makuhari Messe; Tokyo, Japan	
December 22–23, 2018	Makuhari Messe; Tokyo, Japan	
December 21–22, 2019	Makuhari Messe; Tokyo, Japan	
December 19–20, 2020	Online only (Due to COVID-19 restrictions)	
December 18–19, 2021	Makuhari Messe (hybrid physical and digital event); Tokyo, Japan	
December 17–18, 2022	Makuhari Messe; Tokyo, Japan	
December 16–17, 2023	Makuhari Messe; Tokyo, Japan	
December 21–22, 2024	Makuhari Messe; Tokyo, Japan	
December 20-21, 2025	Makuhari Messe; Tokyo, Japan	
