= Yūki Tabata =

Japanese manga artist

Yūki Tabata 田畠裕基
- Born: Fukuoka Prefecture
- Area: Manga artist
- Notable works: Black Clover

Yūki Tabata (Japanese: 田畠裕基, Hepburn: Tabata Yūki) is a Japanese manga artist. After working as an assistant to Toshiaki Iwashiro, he created the one-shot Hungry Joker, which was later serialized as a full series. After its conclusion, he launched Black Clover.

== Biography ==
Yūki Tabata was born in Fukuoka Prefecture, Japan. Before launching his own series, he worked as an assistant to Toshiaki Iwashiro. In 2011, Tabata entered the one-shot Hungry Joker in the Golden Future Cup, which earned first place in the award. This one-shot was later turned into a full series, which ran in Weekly Shōnen Jump from 2012 to 2013.

Following Hungry Joker's completion, Tabata published another one-shot, titled Black Clover, in Shōnen Jump Next!!. This one-shot was later turned into a full series, which started serialization in Weekly Shōnen Jump on February 16, 2015. Soon after Black Clover's debut as a full series, Tabata got married. In the first half of 2017, Black Clover was the 28th best-selling manga in Japan. One year later, the entire Black Clover media franchise was the 24th best-selling media franchise in Japan. The series has been given numerous adaptations, notably an anime television series.

== Style ==
Tabata stated that when making stories, he wants to give each character a chance in the spotlight. When it comes to the characters, he likes to give each a defining trait to make them memorable to the reader. As for their designs, he stated that he likes to have fun drawing, so if part of a character's design frustrates him, he changes it.

== Influences ==
Tabata has cited Akira Toriyama's Dragon Ball as a major influence over his work, even stating it was one of the main reasons he decided to become a manga artist. Tabata has also cited Kentaro Miura's Berserk, Tite Kubo's Bleach, Yoshihiro Togashi's YuYu Hakusho, Masashi Kishimoto's Naruto, and Eiichiro Oda's One Piece as sources of inspiration.

== Works ==
- Hungry Joker (2012–2013) (serialized in Weekly Shōnen Jump)
- Black Clover (ブラッククローバー, Burakku Kurōbā) (2015–2026) (serialized in Weekly Shōnen Jump (2015–2023) and Jump Giga (2023–2026))
