= Mobile Suit SD Gundam =

Original video animation

- 2011 cover to G-Collection: Mobile Suit SD Gundam DVD-Box, distributed by Bandai Visual

機動戦士SDガンダム (Kidō Senshi Esudī Gandamu)
- Genre: Mecha, Comedy, Action, Parody
- Created by: Hajime Yatate; Yoshiyuki Tomino
- Anime film
- Directed by: Osamu Sekita
- Written by: Hiroyuki Hoshiyama
- Music by: Norimasa Yamanaka
- Studio: Sunrise
- Released: March 12, 1988
- Runtime: 20 minutes
- Original video animation
- Studio: Sunrise
- Released: May 25, 1988 – October 25, 1990
- Runtime: 30 minutes per OVA
- Episodes: 5
- Anime film

Mobile Suit SD Gundam's Counterattack
- Directed by: Shinji Takamatsu; Tetsuro Amino
- Written by: Tetsuro Amino
- Music by: Osamu Totsuka
- Studio: Sunrise
- Released: July 15, 1989
- Runtime: 24 minutes
- Original video animation

Mobile Suit SD Gundam: SD Gundam Legend
- Directed by: Tetsuro Amino
- Written by: Tetsuro Amino
- Music by: Toru Okada
- Studio: Sunrise
- Released: March 25, 1990 – March 21, 1991
- Runtime: 28 minutes per OVA
- Episodes: 4
- Anime film

Mobile Suit SD Gundam: Musha, Knight, Commando: SD Gundam Emergency Sortie
- Directed by: Takeyuki Kanda
- Written by: Takeyuki Kanda
- Studio: Sunrise
- Released: March 16, 1991
- Runtime: 16 minutes
- Anime film

Mobile Suit SD Gundam: Dawn of Papal, Episode 103: Suginamu's Bride
- Directed by: Takeyuki Kanda
- Written by: Takeyuki Kanda
- Studio: Sunrise
- Released: August 22, 1991
- Runtime: 16 minutes
- Anime film

Mobile Suit SD Gundam Festival
- Directed by: Takashi Imanishi; Tetsuro Amino
- Written by: Asahide Ookuma; Tetsuro Amino
- Studio: Sunrise
- Released: March 13, 1993
- Runtime: 81 minutes

Mobile Suit SD Gundam (Japanese: 機動戦士SDガンダム, Hepburn: Kidō Senshi SD Gundam) is a series of animated shorts released in theaters and as original video animation between 1988 and 1993 by Sunrise. Part of the SD Gundam media franchise, the anime was based on the popular Gashapon capsule toys and model kits being released by Bandai at the time.

The shorts initially parody stories and characters from the Gundam franchise with super deformed forms of Gundam characters and mecha. Starting with 1989's Mobile Suit SD Gundam's Counterattack, the series began featuring a regularly appearing set of SD Gundam characters based on existing SD Gundam toys, Carddass trading cards and manga series, notably from the Command Gundam, Knight Gundam, and Musha Gundam sub-franchises.

== Works ==
Mobile Suit SD Gundam was released as a series of shorts accompanying feature films by Sunrise, or in OVA form. Eventually a feature film and a TV series were also made. The complete list of works are as follows:

- Mobile Suit SD Gundam (機動戦士SDガンダム, Kidō Senshi SD Gundam) (theatrical shorts, March 1988)

Released with Mobile Suit Gundam: Char's Counterattack. Contains the following shorts:
- Fierce Fighting Chapter: Will Gundam Rise Up? (激闘編 ガンダム大地に立てるか！？, Gekitō-hen: Gundam Daichi ni Tateru ka!?)
- Holiday Chapter: Menace of the Zeon Hotel? The Order to Destroy Gundam Pension!! (休日編 ジオン・ホテルの脅威？ガンダム・ペンション破壊命令！！, Kyūjitsu-hen: Zeon Hotel no Kyōi? Gundam Penshon Hakai Meirei!!)
The video release includes the two shorts from the theatrical release above, in addition to a new episode:
- Decisive Battle Chapter: SD Olympic!! The Stadium Saturated with Laughs (決戦編 SDオリンピック！！スタジアム・笑いに染めて, Kessen-hen: SD Olympic!! Stadium Warai ni Somete)

- Mobile Suit SD Gundam Mark II (機動戦士SDガンダム MARK-II, Kidō Senshi SD Gundam MARK-II) (OVA, June 1989)

Includes the following shorts:
- The Rolling Colony Affair (転がるコロニー事件, Korogaru Colony Jiken)
- Original Gundam Stray Scenes Collection (元祖・ガンダム迷場面集, Ganzo Gundam Meibamen-shū) (omake)
- Gundam Legend (巖蛇武（ガンダム）伝説, Gundam Densetsu)

- Mobile Suit SD Gundam's Counterattack: Musha Gundam Visits (機動戦士SDガンダムの逆襲 武者ガンダム参上, Kidō Senshi SD Gundam no Gyakushū Musha Gandamu Sanjō) (theatrical shorts, July 1989)

Released with Patlabor: The Movie. First animated appearance of the SD Sengokuden sub-series, which is based on the Musha Gundam toy line. Includes the following shorts:
- The Storm-Calling School Festival (嵐を呼ぶ学園祭, Arashi wo Yobu Gakuen-sai)
- SD Warring States Legend: Chapter A Bao A Qu (SD戦国伝 暴終空城の章, SD Sengokuden: Abaowakūjō no Shō)

- Mobile Suit SD Gundam Mark III (機動戦士SDガンダム MARK-III, Kidō Senshi SD Gundam MARK-III) (OVA, March 1990)

Includes the following shorts:
- Battle of the Mystery of the Universe (宇宙の神秘大作戦, Uchū no Shinpi Daisakusen)
- SD Sengokuden: Zumushitei no Ninja Gassen (SD戦国伝 頭虫邸の忍者合戦)
- SD Sengokuden: Ten no Maki (SD戦国伝 天の巻)
- SD Sengokuden: Ji no Maki (SD戦国伝 地の巻)
- SD Sengokuden: Shin no Maki (SD戦国伝 真の巻)
- SD Sengokuden: Ri no Maki (SD戦国伝 理の巻)

- Mobile Suit SD Gundam Mark IV (機動戦士SDガンダム MARK-IV, Kidō Senshi SD Gundam MARK-IV) (OVA, September 1990)

Includes the following shorts:
- SD Gundam SD Wacky Races (SDガンダム チキチキSD猛レース, SD Gundam Chiki Chiki SD Mō Race). Based on the American cartoon, Wacky Races. Due to copyright issues, this short was never released on DVD.
- Dream Maron Company: "A Space Odyssey" (夢のマロン社「宇宙の旅」, Yume no Maron-sha: Uchū no Tabi)
  - Appendix Part One: The One Year War Mobile Suit Catalog

- Mobile Suit SD Gundam Mark V (機動戦士SDガンダム MARK-V, Kidō Senshi SD Gundam MARK-V) (OVA, October 1990)

Includes the following shorts:
- Miracle of Courier Re-GZ (運び屋リ・ガズィの奇跡, Hakobi-ya Re-GZ no Kiseki)
- SD Sengokuden: Gundam Go-ninshū no Mononoke Taiji (SD戦国伝 頑駄無五人衆のもののけ退治)
- SD Gundam Sōseiki: Pikirienta Pōresu (SDガンダム創世記 ピキリエンタ ポーレス)

- Mobile Suit SD Gundam: SD Gundam Legend (機動戦士SDガンダム SDガンダム外伝, Kidō Senshi SD Gundam: SD Gundam Gaiden) (OVA, March 1990 to March 1991)

A series of four OVAs adapted from the manga series, SD Gundam Gaiden Sieg Zion Hen, featuring Knight Gundam:
- SD Gundam Legend: Lacroan Hero (SDガンダム外伝 ラクロアの勇者, SD Gundam Gaiden: Rakuroa no Yūsha)
- SD Gundam Legend II: Legendary Giant (SDガンダム外伝II 伝説の巨人, SD Gundam Gaiden II: Densetsu no Kyojin)
- SD Gundam Legend III: Algus Knights (SDガンダム外伝III アルガス騎士団, SD Gundam Gaiden III: Arugasu Kishidan)
- SD Gundam Legend IV: The Knight of Flash (SDガンダム外伝IV 光の騎士, SD Gundam Gaiden IV: Hikari no Kishi)

- Mobile Suit SD Gundam The Movie: Musha Knight Command: SD Gundam Scramble (機動戦士ＳＤガンダム劇場版 武者・騎士・コマンド SDガンダム緊急出撃, Kidō Senshi SD Gundam Gekijō-ban Musha Kishi Comando SD Gundam Kinkyū Shutsugeki) (theatrical short, March 1991)

Released with Mobile Suit Gundam F91. Features the first ever team-up of Command Gundam, Knight Gundam, Musha Gundam, who work together with a young girl named Riplin to fight evil. Video release contains SD Gundam Scramble along with two new segments:
- Dawn of Paparu: Episode 103 "Suginamu's Bride" (パパルの暁 第103話「スギナムの花嫁」, Paparu no Akatsuki Dai 103-wa "Suginamu no Hanayome)
- G-ARMS Course (『G-ARMS』講座, "G-ARMS" kōza) (live-action omake introducing the different members of the SD Command Chronicles team, G-ARMS)

- Mobile Suit SD Gundam Festival (機動戦士SDガンダムまつり, Kidō Senshi SD Gundam Matsuri) (movie, March 1993)

A feature-length movie divided into multiple parts as follows:
- SD Command Chronicles II: Gundam Force Super G-ARMS Final Formula VS Noumugather (ＳＤコマンド戦記II ガンダムフォース スーパーＧアームズ ファイナルフォーミュラーVSノウムギャザー). A teamup between various teams from SD Command Chronicles: SD Command Chronicles II's "Crushers" and SD Command Chronicles III's "Super G-Arms" and the Super Knight Final Formula.
- SD Gundam Gaiden: Seikihei Monogatari: Dai 1-shō (SDガンダム外伝 聖機兵物語 第1章) & SD Gundam Gaiden: Seikihei Monogatari: Dai 2-shō (SDガンダム外伝 聖機兵物語 第2章). Adaptation of the Knight Gundam Cardass and manga story, Seikihei Monogatari.
- SD Sengokuden: Tenka Taihei-hen (SD戦国伝 天下泰平編)

== Releases ==
An 8-episode TV series, Do Your Best! The SD Gundam March (ガンバレ!SDガンダム大行進, Ganbare! SD Gundam Dai Kōshin), was aired on TV Tokyo from February to March 1993, compiling the various Mobile Suit SD Gundam shorts as well as some variety segments. The show achieved a TV rating of 8.06% in the Kanto region.

All of the animated shorts, with the exception of SD Gundam SD Wacky Races, were later re-released in a DVD-BOX in Japan on July 22, 2007.

Preceded by Mobile Suit Gundam: Char's Counterattack	Gundam metaseries (production order); 1989-1993	Succeeded by Mobile Suit Gundam 0080: War in the Pocket
