= Gakuto Kajiwara =

Japanese voice actor

- 梶原 岳人
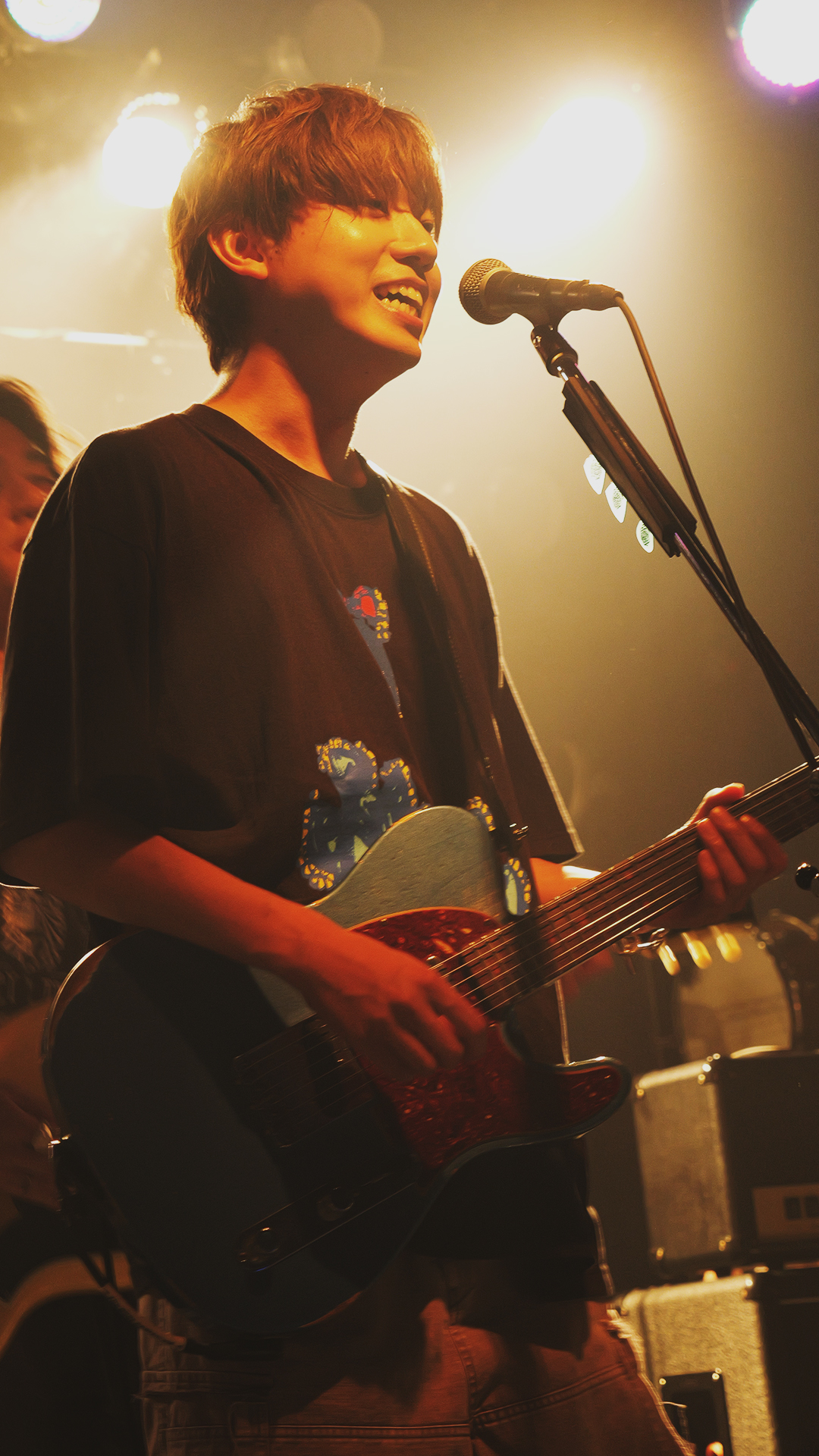
- Kajiwara in 2026
- Born: 28 November 1994 (age 31); Osaka Prefecture, Japan
- Education: Nihon University College of Art
- Occupations: Voice actor; singer
- Years active: 2017–present
- Agent: Haikyō
- Notable work: The Legend of Heroes: Trails into Reverie as Swin Abel; Loop8: Summer of Gods as Nini; Black Clover as Asta; Fire Force as Shinra Kusakabe; Komi Can't Communicate as Hitohito Tadano; Honkai: Star Rail as Luka
- Height: 178 cm (5 ft 10 in)
- Spouse: Marina Yamada (m. 2025)
- Children: 1
- Awards: Best New Actor Award at the 14th Seiyu Awards
- Musical career
- Genres: J-pop; Anime Song
- Instrument: Voice
- Years active: 2020–present
- Label: Avex Pictures
- Website: avex.jp/kajiwaragakuto/

Gakuto Kajiwara (梶原 岳人, Kajiwara Gakuto; born 28 November 1994) is a Japanese voice actor and singer. He is affiliated with Haikyō. He is best known for voicing Asta in Black Clover, Shinra Kusakabe in Fire Force, Hitohito Tadano in Komi Can't Communicate, Luka in Honkai: Star Rail, and Hiiro Amagi in Ensemble Stars!.

== Early life and career ==
Kajiwara was born in Osaka Prefecture on 28 November 1994. He stated that during elementary school, he loved to watch anime series Dragon Ball, which was re-broadcasting during that time. He also stated that it has led him to become absorbed in manga and anime.

In 2017, he had a leading role and voiced Asta in the popular anime series Black Clover.

On 8 March 2020, he won the Best New Actor Award at the 14th Seiyu Awards. The ceremony was originally scheduled to be held at the Bunka Housou Media Plus Hall before being cancelled due to the COVID-19 pandemic. The results were instead announced on the Chou! A&G radio program.

On 31 August 2020, Kajiwara made his musical debut, signing with Avex Pictures. His debut single "A Walk" was released on 25 November 2020, and was used as the twelfth ending theme for Black Clover.

== Personal life ==
On December 31, 2025, a day before the new year, Kajiwara announced on his official social media that he has married former HKT48 member and fellow voice actor Marina Yamada, they also shared that they had welcomed the birth of their first child.

== Filmography ==
=== Anime series ===
| Year | Series | Role | Ref. |
|---|---|---|---|
| 2017 | Eromanga Sensei | Megumi's classmate | |
| 2017 | Black Clover | Asta | |
| 2017 | Elegant Yokai Apartment Life | Boy B | |
| 2017 | Inuyashiki | Koike, Male Student, Policeman, SAT Member | |
| 2017 | The Idolmaster SideM | Teammate | |
| 2018 | Dame×Prince Anime Caravan | Narek's Guard 1 | |
| 2018 | School Babysitters | Boys | |
| 2018 | The Ryuo's Work Is Never Done! | Youth B | |
| 2018 | You Don't Know Gunma Yet | Nori Kamitsuki | |
| 2018 | Gundam Build Divers | Orb Military Diver C | |
| 2018 | Umamusume: Pretty Derby | Audience | |
| 2018 | Butlers: Chitose Momotose Monogatari | Male Student | |
| 2018 | The Disastrous Life of Saiki K. | Monk B | |
| 2018 | Cells at Work! | Red Blood Cell 1 | |
| 2018 | Hugtto! PreCure | Boy | |
| 2018 | Bloom into You | Junior high classmate, Male student | |
| 2018 | That Time I Got Reincarnated as a Slime | Goblin D, Gobzo | |
| 2018 | Tsurune | Male Student | |
| 2018 | JoJo's Bizarre Adventure: Golden Wind | Blond Man | |
| 2019 | Domestic Girlfriend | Kazushi Kine | |
| 2019 | The Rising of the Shield Hero | Ake | |
| 2019 | We Never Learn | Student A, Takahashi | |
| 2019 | Fruits Basket | Schoolboy | |
| 2019 | Fire Force | Shinra Kusakabe | |
| 2019 | Star-Myu | Student | |
| 2019 | Actors: Songs Connection | Saku Otonomiya | |
| 2019 | Welcome to Demon School! Iruma-kun | Kamui Caim, Oswaal Orias | |
| 2020 | number24 | Syouta U | |
| 2020 | Case File nº221: Kabukicho | Saizo Kumogakure (young) | |
| 2020 | Shadowverse | Hiiro Ryūgasaki | |
| 2020 | Ace of Diamond Act II | Masanori Kawabata | |
| 2020 | Haikyu!! To The Top | Player from another school | |
| 2020 | Rent-A-Girlfriend | Shun Kuribayashi | |
| 2020 | Fire Force 2nd Season | Shinra Kusakabe | |
| 2020 | SD Gundam World Sangoku Soketsuden | Liu Bei Unicorn Gundam | |
| 2020 | Adachi and Shimamura | Hanasaki Taro | |
| 2021 | 2.43: Seiin High School Boys Volleyball Team | Naoyasu Uchimura | |
| 2021 | SSSS.Dynazenon | Nazumi | |
| 2021 | SD Gundam World Heroes | Liu Bei Unicorn Gundam | |
| 2021 | JoJo's Bizarre Adventure: Stone Ocean | Romeo Jisso | |
| 2021 | Komi Can't Communicate | Hitohito Tadano | |
| 2021 | Waccha PriMagi! | Toma Ibuki | |
| 2022 | Orient | Katsumi Amako | |
| 2022 | Tribe Nine | Kai Asahikawa | |
| 2023 | Technoroid Overmind | Night | |
| 2023 | The Reincarnation of the Strongest Exorcist in Another World | Cecilio Astilia | |
| 2023 | Ayaka: A Story of Bonds and Wounds | Chatarō Fukuwake | |
| 2023 | Jujutsu Kaisen 2nd Season | Yu Haibara | |
| 2023 | KamiErabi God.app | Kōki | |
| 2023 | Paradox Live the Animation | Allen Sugasano | |
| 2024 | Sasaki and Peeps | Kai | |
| 2024 | Senpai Is an Otokonoko | Jun Saotome | |
| 2024 | Tasūketsu: Fate of the Majority | Tōya Mutsuki | |
| 2024 | How I Attended an All-Guy's Mixer | Hagi | |
| 2024 | Haigakura | Hōryūsei | |
| 2024 | A Terrified Teacher at Ghoul School! | Amaaki Abe | |
| 2024 | Blue Lock vs. U-20 Japan | Teru Kitsunezato | |
| 2025 | Rurouni Kenshin: Kyoto Disturbance | Fuji | |
| 2025 | Me and the Alien MuMu | Akihiro Tsurumi | |
| 2025 | Scooped Up by an S-Rank Adventurer! | Lloyd | |
| 2025 | Fate/strange Fake | Sigma | |
| 2026 | I Became a Legend After My 10 Year-Long Last Stand | Luck | |
| 2026 | Kirio Fan Club | Ken Kirio | |
| 2026 | Tank Chair | Naozumi Kurosaka | |
| 2026 | Romelia War Chronicle | Ragn | |
| 2027 | My Crush's Crush | Sora Akizuki | |

=== Anime films ===
| Year | Title | Role | Ref. |
|---|---|---|---|
| 2018 | K Seven Stories Episode 1 [R:B ~BLAZE~] | Mafia | |
| 2022 | The First Slam Dunk | Sōta Miyagi | |
| 2023 | Black Clover: Sword of the Wizard King | Asta | |

=== Original net animation ===
| Year | Title | Role | Ref. |
|---|---|---|---|
| 2017 | Monster Strike | Passerby | |
| 2019 | Mugyutto! Black Clover | Asta | |
| 2020 | SD Gundam World Sangoku Soketsuden | Liu Bei Unicorn Gundam | |
| 2021–22 | JoJo's Bizarre Adventure: Stone Ocean | Romeo Jisso | |
| 2022 | Romantic Killer | Junta Hayami | |

=== Tokusatsu ===
| Year | Title | Role | Ref. |
|---|---|---|---|
| 2022 | Ultraman Decker | Ultra D Flasher, Ultra Dual Sword, Decker Shield Calibur (announcing voice) | |

=== Video games ===
| Year | Title | Role | Ref. |
|---|---|---|---|
| 2018 | I-chu | Mashiro Kisaragi | |
| 2018 | Black Clover: Quartet Knights | Asta | |
| 2018 | Libra of Precatus | Paul Maynes | |
| 2019 | Jump Force | Asta | |
| 2019 | DANKIRA!!! – Boys, be DANCING! | Asahi Sora | |
| 2019 | Bungo to Alchemist | Miki Rofuu | |
| 2019 | Cafe Enchante | AKIRA MIKADO | |
| 2019 | SD Gundam G Generation Cross Rays | My Character Voice (Male 02), General Soldier Voice | |
| 2020 | Fire Emblem Heroes | Ced | |
| 2020 | REALIVE!～Teito Kagurabutai～ | Yuma Kazami | |
| 2020 | Ensemble Stars!! Basic and Music! | Hiiro Amagi | |
| 2020 | Kingdom of Hero : Tactics War | Lancelot | |
| 2020 | The Legend of Heroes: Trails into Reverie | Swin Abel | |
| 2020 | From Argonavis | Haruka Nijō | |
| 2021 | Jack Jeanne | Mitsuki Shirota | |
| 2021 | Monark | Protagonist | |
| 2022 | The Legend of Heroes: Trails Through Daybreak II | Swin Abel | |
| 2022 | Xenoblade Chronicles 3 | Gravel | |
| 2022 | Star Ocean: The Divine Force | Gaston Gaucier | |
| 2022 | Touken Ranbu | Nukemaru | |
| 2022 | World II World | Fuzhou | |
| 2023 | Loop8: Summer of Gods | Nini | |
| 2023 | Tower of Fantasy | Icarus | |
| 2023 | Honkai: Star Rail | Luka | |
| 2025 | Tower of Saviors | Sanctified Arrows – Di Hong | |

=== Drama CD ===
| Year | Title | Role | Ref. |
|---|---|---|---|
| 2017 | Umamusume: Pretty Derby – Starting Gate 03 | Male | |
| 2019 | Paradox Live | Allen Sugasano | |

=== Radio ===
- Flame Flame Norajiwo (2019) – Radiotalk
- MAN TWO MONTH RADIO Gakumon's Recommendation (2020) - Super! A & G +, AG-ON Premium

=== Dubbing ===
- Batwheels - Bam / Batmobile

== Awards and nominations ==
| Year | Award | Category | Work/Recipient | Result | Ref(s) |
|---|---|---|---|---|---|
| 2020 | 14th Seiyu Awards | Best New Actor Award | Shinra Kusakabe (Fire Force) | Won | |
