= SD Gundam Sangokuden Brave Battle Warriors =

Television series

- Cover art

SDガンダム三国伝 BraveBattleWarriors (Esudī Gandamu Sangokuden BraveBattleWarriors)
- Genre: Action, Mecha, Military history
- Created by: Hajime Yatate; Yoshiyuki Tomino
- Anime film

Chō Denei-ban SD Gundam Sangokuden Brave Battle Warriors
- Directed by: Kenichi Suzuki; Kunihiro Mori
- Written by: Miyuki Kishimoto
- Studio: Sunrise
- Licensed by: NA: Sunrise
- Released: February 27, 2010
- Runtime: 15 minutes
- Anime television series
- Directed by: Kenichi Suzuki; Kunihiro Mori
- Written by: Tatsuhiko Urahata
- Music by: Kei Yoshikawa
- Studio: Sunrise
- Licensed by: NA: Sunrise
- Original network: TXN (TV Tokyo), AT-X
- Original run: April 3, 2010 – March 26, 2011
- Episodes: 52

SD Gundam Sangokuden Brave Battle Warriors (Japanese: SDガンダム三国伝 BraveBattleWarriors; lit. SD Gundam Legend of the Three Kingdoms BraveBattleWarriors) is a Japanese anime adaptation of the SD Gundam model kit series BB Senshi Sangokuden produced by Sunrise. Loosely based on the classic 14th century Chinese historical novel, Romance of the Three Kingdoms, with characters being personifications of various mobile suits from the Gundam franchise, the show first premiered in Japanese theaters as a 15-minute short film titled Chō Denei-ban SD Gundam Sangokuden Brave Battle Warriors (超電影版SDガンダム三国伝 BraveBattleWarriors) on February 27, 2010. The broadcast of the television series followed two months later on TXN stations on April 3, 2010. It was directed by Kenichi Suzuki and Kunihiro Mori, and ran for 51 episodes.

== Plot ==
=== TV series ===
Long ago, Three Sovereigns descended from the heavens onto the land of Militia. According to legend, the Three Sovereigns used their powers to bring order to the land. One became the Sun and bathed the world with its sunlight. One became the Moon and healed the world with its moonlight. One became the sea and nurtured the world with its waters. It is foretold that a time of strife shall arrive.

"When Militia is shrouded in darkness, the souls of the Three Sovereigns shall be entrusted to the Gundams. Only with guidance from the Gyokuji, shall they exorcise the land from darkness..." - Militia Legend, "G Records"-

That time of strife will be known as Sangokuden, and that time has come upon us.

=== Movie ===
Chō Denei-ban SD Gundam Sangokuden Brave Battle Warriors is a special movie episode that screened with the fifth Sgt. Frog (Keroro Gunsō) film, Keroro Gunso the Super Movie: Creation! Ultimate Keroro, Wonder Space-Time Island. The story is set chronologically during episode 4 of the SD Gundam Sangokuden Brave Battle Warriors anime series, after Toutaku has Reitei assassinated, and before Sousou tries to assassinate Toutaku.

== Characters ==
Note: This cast list is still incomplete.

The following are the main characters that appear in the anime. They are grouped according to different factions/teams/armies: Ryuubi, Sousou, Sonken, Ryofu, Toutaku, Enshou, Enjyutsu, and Others.

=== Ryuubi Faction (劉備の仲間) ===
- Ryuubi Gundam (劉備ガンダム)

Voiced by: Yūki Kaji

- Kan-u Gundam (關羽ガンダム)

Voiced by: Hiroki Yasumoto

- Chouhi Gundam (張飛ガンダム)

Voiced by: Masayuki Katou

- Kousonsan Ez-8 (公孫瓚イージーエイト)

Voiced by: Satoru Inoue

- Chou-un Gundam (趙雲ガンダム)

Voiced by: Yuuki Ono

- Roshoku GM Cannon (盧植ジムキャノン)

Voiced by: Tetsuo Komura

- Koumei Re-GZ (孔明リ・ガズィ)

Voiced by: Kazutaka Ishii

=== Sousou Faction (曹操の仲間) ===
- Sousou Gundam (曹操ガンダム)

Voiced by: Kenji Nomura

- Kakouton Giros (夏侯惇ギロス)

Voiced by: Shigeo Kiyama

- Kakouen Daras (夏侯淵ダラス)

Voiced by: Takayuki Fujimoto

- Shiba-i Sazabi (司馬懿サザビー)

Voiced by: Keiichi Nakagawa

- Ten-i Asshimar (典韋アッシマー)

Voiced by: Ryū Yamaguchi

- Kakuka Virsago (郭嘉ヴァサーゴ)

Voiced by: Hisayoshi Suganuma

- Jyokou Serpent (徐晃サーペント)

Voiced by: Hiromu Miyazaki

- Choukou Zaku III (張郃ザクIII)

Voiced by: Ryō Iwasaki

- Souhi Gundam (曹丕ガンダム)

Voiced by: Daisuke Sakaguchi

=== Sonken Faction (孫権の仲間) ===
- Sonken Gundam (孫権ガンダム)

Voiced by: Nobunaga Shimazaki

- Sonken Zephyranthes (孫堅ゼフィランサス)

Voiced by: Takashi Nagasako

- Sonsaku Physalis (孫策サイサリス)

Voiced by: Riki Kitazawa

- Shuuyu Hyakushiki (周瑜ヒャクシキ)

Voiced by: Daisuke Hirakawa

- Sonshoukou Gerbera (孫尚香ガーベラ)

Voiced by: Akemi Kanda

- Kougai Gouf (黄蓋グフ)

Voiced by: Naoki Imamura

- Taishiji Dom (太史慈ドム)

Voiced by: Masato Funaki

- Rikuson Zetaplus (陸遜ゼータプラス)

Voiced by: Hiro Shimono

- Ryomou Dijeh (呂蒙ディジェ)

Voiced by: Masakazu Morita

- Kannei Kampfer (甘寧ケンプファー)

Voiced by: Takuma Terashima

=== Ryofu Team (呂布隊) ===
- Ryofu Tallgeese (呂布トールギス)

Voiced by: Atsushi Miyauchi

- Chou-sen Qubeley (貂蝉キュベレイ)

Voiced by: Ayumi Tsunematsu

- Chouryou Gelgoog (張遼ゲルググ)

Voiced by: Tomoyuki Higuchi

- Chinkyuu Mercurius (陳宮メリクリウス)

Voiced by: Mizuki Nakamura

- Koushun Vayeate (高順ヴァイエイト)

Voiced by: Hiromu Miyazaki

=== Toutaku Faction (董卓の仲間) ===
- Toutaku Zaku (董卓ザク)

Voiced by: Tetsuo Komura

- Riju Shokew (李儒シャッコー)

Voiced by: Shigeo Kiyama

- Kayuu Zanneck (華雄ザンネック)

Voiced by: Hiroaki Ishikawa

=== Enshou Army (袁紹軍) ===
- Enshou Bawoo (袁紹バウ)

Voiced by: Yōsuke Akimoto

- Ganryou Gazu-L (顔良ガズアル)

Voiced by: Hiromi Sugino

- Bunshuu Gazu-R (文醜ガズエル)

Voiced by: Ryou Sugisaki

- Soju R-Jarja (沮授Rジャジャ)

Voiced by: Shigeo Kiyama

- Denpou Galus J (田豊ガルスJ)

Voiced by: Hiroshi Shirokuma

=== Enjyutsu Army (袁術軍) ===
- Enjyutsu Zssa (袁術ズサ)

Voiced by: Masaaki Ōkura

- Kirei Hamma Hamma (紀靈ハンマハンマ)

Voiced by: Kiyoshi Katsunuma

- Choushuu Britova (張繡ブリトヴァ)

Voiced by: Shūhei Sakaguchi

- Kaku Ashtaron (賈詡アシュタロン)

Voiced by: Kiyohito Yoshikai

=== Others (その他) ===
- Saibou Agguguy (蔡瑁アッグガイ)

Voiced by: Riki Kitazawa

- Kougetsuei Gun-EZ (黄月英ガンイージ)

Voiced by: Yū Shimamura

- Ryuuhyou Gundam (劉表ガンダム)

Voiced by: Hironori Miyata

- Kan-pei Gundam (關平ガンダム)

Voiced by: Rika Komatsu

- Teiiku Wise Wallaby (程昱ワイズワラビー)

Voiced by: Tomoyuki Shimura

- Shuusou Dovenwolf (周倉ドーベンウルフ)

Voiced by: Masuo Amada

- Suikyou Guntank (水鏡ガンタンク)

Voiced by: Naoki Bandō

- Bachou Blue Destiny (馬超ブルーディスティニー)

Voiced by: Mutsumi Tamura

- Touken GM (陶謙ジム)

Voiced by: Toshihide Tsuchiya

- Touton Memedorza (蹋頓メッメドーザ)

Voiced by: Kazunari Tanaka

- Koshin Gyan (胡軫ギャン)

Voiced by: Rikiya Koyama

- Choukaku Palace Athene (張角パラスアテネ)

Voiced by: Hiroshi Shirokuma

- Choubou Bolinoak Samaan (張宝ボリノークサマーン)

Voiced by: Hiroaki Ishikawa

- Chouryou Messala (張良メッサーラ)

Voiced by: Takahiro Mizushima

- Kouten The. O (黄天ジ・オ)

Voiced by: Hiroshi Shirokuma, Hiroaki Ishikawa, Takahiro Mizushima

- Bagengi Zaku (馬元義ザク)

Voiced by: Hiromi Sugino

- Shushun Zaku Cannon (朱儁ザクキャノン)

Voiced by: Hiromi Sugino

- Reitei Gundam (霊帝ガンダム)

Voiced by: Daisuke Hirakawa

== Music ==
The show does not feature an opening vocal theme song. However, there two ending theme songs. The first ending theme, "Militia Legend ~The Brave Legend~" (三璃紗伝說 ~The Brave Legend~), is performed by Ko-saku. This is the same theme song that has been featured in promotional animation for the BB Senshi Sangokuden model kit series. The second ending theme, "Justice ・Carve a Legend!" (Justice ・伝説を刻め！), which is used from episode 27 onwards, is performed by Ryuubi (Yūki Kaji), Kan-u (Hiroki Yasumoto), Chouhi (Masayuki Kato), Sousou (Kenji Nomura) and Sonken (Nobunaga Shimazaki).

Preceded by Mobile Suit Gundam Unicorn	Gundam metaseries (production order); 2010	Succeeded by Mobile Suit Gundam 00 the Movie: A Wakening of the Trailblazer
