= SD Gundam Gaiden Sieg Zion Hen =

Japanese media project

SD Gundam Gaiden Sieg Zion Hen (SDガンダム外伝 ジークジオン編, lit. SD Gundam Sidestory: Sieg Zion Chapter) is a Japanese media project within the SD Gundam franchise produced between 1989 and 1990, centered on Bandai's plamo and Carddass trading cards. A manga drawn by Ryuuichi Hoshino and an anime adaptation of said manga by Sunrise were also released. It is the first work of the Knight Gundam series.

== Overview ==
Based on illustrations of a knight-style SD Gundam by Koji Yokoi, SD Gundam Gaiden features fantasy Japanese role-playing game styled visuals and storytelling, similar to the Dragon Quest franchise by Enix.

Characters are based on characters and mecha from Mobile Suit Gundam, Mobile Suit Zeta Gundam, Mobile Suit Gundam ZZ, Mobile Suit Gundam: Char's Counterattack and Mobile Suit Gundam 0080: War in the Pocket.

== Story ==
The story is set in the mystical land of Lacroa, where humans and robot knights live together. The main character is Knight Gundam, a noble warrior with no memory of his past. Knight Gundam clashes many times with the evil Satan Gundam. Knight Gundam ultimately learns that his amnesia is due to himself and Devil Satan Gundam originally having been a single Gundam before splitting in two.

=== Chapters ===
Lacroan Hero

The Devil Satan Gundam appeared with the aim to conquer the peaceful Saddrac World. In order to rescue the world from threat of the devil, Lacroa's hero Knight Gundam stood up against Satan Gundam.

The Legendary Giant

With Satan Gundam defeated the group returns to Lacroa to find Lacroa destroyed by a new threat, the legendary giant. The group set off again to defeat the legendary giant.

Algus Knights

Amuro who left Lacroa for training becomes the leader of the Algus Knights, a group of knights which is breaking apart without leadership. The new Algus Knights stand up against the Munzo Empire which is under influence of the Zeon race.

The Knight of Flash

With power of the Harp of Guidance, Knight Gundam and the Algus Knights are transported to the reverse of Saddrac World - the Moore dimension. There the final battle with Zeon race mastermind Sieg Zion and the resurrected Black Dragon unfolds.

== Characters ==
=== Lacroa Kingdom ===
Knight Gundam/ Vassal knight Gundam (騎士ガンダム/バーサル騎士ガンダム)

Knight of the Gundam Clan. A mysterious knight with the same name as the legendary hero who comes to help Princess Frau to suppress Satan Gundam. His is actually a fragment of Superior Dragon.
The original setting is that Gundam Mark Three from the Musha Gundam world who was running from his pursuers as he stolen the Platina Shield when he was struck by lightning and transported to Saddrac World where his good half became Knight Gundam (and bad half Satan Gundam). That setting clashed with the explanation of Superior Dragon and was thought to be ignored but it was later fixed by saying that Satan Gundam fused with a dragon on arrival at Saddrac World.
Throughout the story Knight Gundam underwent two appearance change. One is the Fullarmor Knight Gundam which is Knight Gundam equipped with the sacred armor of the Gundam Clan. Another is the Vessal Knight Gundam which is Knight Gundam in a completely new set of armour.
Knight Superior Dragon (騎士スペリオルドラゴン)

The guardian god of the Saddrac World. Formed by the fusion of Vessal Knight Gundam and Neo Black Dragon on realizing that they originated from a single being. A reappearing character in the Knight Gundam series.

Knight Amuro (騎士アムロ)

A young knight of the Lacroa Knights. Fought with Knight Gundam against Satan Gundam's troops. In "Algus Knights", he took over as leader of the Algus Knights replacing Knight Alex who was trapped by the enemy. In "knight of Light", he became the Lacroa Knights leader. Following that he made appearances in Seikihei Monogatari and Kikoushin Densetsu.
In the beginning his armour resembled the Federation suit in Mobile Suit Gundam then he changed to one modelled after Dijeh in "Algus Knights" then in Seikihei Monogatari to one resembling Nu Gundam.

Fighter Guncannon (戦士ガンキャノン)

Fighter of the Lacroa Knights. In "The legendary giant" his body was possessed and taken over by Black Dragon.

Priest Guntank (僧侶ガンタンク)

A priest of the Lacroa Kingdom.

Elf GM Sniper Custom (妖精ジムスナイパーカスタム)

An elf whom Knight Gundam's party met in the forest. An expert archer, he protects the forest. Later on he appeared again in Gold Saga.

Martial Artist Nemo (武闘家ネモ)

Martial artist of the Lacroa Knights. Appeared in "The legendary giant". An active character in both the manga and games.

Knight Sayla (騎士セイラ)

A female Lacroan knight. Her family had protected the Three Sacred Instruments for generations, during her duty she was cursed by the Zeon Clan and turned into a Slime Adzam. On defeating Sorceress Lalah, the curse was broken and she returned to normal. Her brother is Knight Char.

Mystery Knight Char/ Golden Knight (謎の騎士シャア/黄金の騎士)

A knight serving neither the Union Clan nor the Zeon Clan. He is journeying in search of his missing sister and a way to break the curse cast upon hem by the Zeons. In "The legendary giant", he changed his appearance to the Golden Knight and helped Knight Gundam's party. In "Knight of Light", he used the crystal of Psycho Golem to enter the Moore dimension and suppressed Sieg Zion with the Spirit of Psycho Golem allowing Superior Dragon time to form his attack. Later on appeared as Tactician Quattro in Seikihei Monogatari and in Kikoushin Densetsu in both he belong to the Neo Zeon Clan.

Princess Frau (フラウ姫)

Princess of the Lacroa Kingdom. On her way to see the fallen star she was attacked by a monster and was saved by the amnesic Knight Gundam. To repay the rescue, Frau invited her saviour to the palace. There her father was shocked to hear that Frau's saviour has the same name as the legendary hero.

King Revil (レビル王)

King of Lacroa. Presented the title of "Knight" to the amnesic Gundam who holds the same name as the legendary hero and entrusted the future of Saddrac World to him. When the legendary giant destroyed Lacroa, the shock drove him insane. Later when Lacroa is restored he presented the title "Vassal Knight" to Knight Gundam.

Pegasus Whitebase (天馬ホワイトベース)

Knight Amuro's holy flying horse.

GM Henson family (町人ジムヘンソン一家)

A family living in Lacroa. When the giant attacked the family was shifted to the Stone Fort in the desert.

Fairy Kikka (妖精キッカ)

A fairy that knows the secrets of the legendary giant. Able to summon the Bow and Arrow of Light.

=== Algus Kingdom ===
Swordsman Zeta (剣士ゼータ)

Leader of the Algus Knights horseback team. Rides on his horse, Argama. A swift worker, always the first to take action. He believe that the human Amuro can be a good leader for the Algus Knights.

Warrior Double Zeta (闘士ダブルゼータ)

Leader of the Algus Knights warrior team.

Wizard Nu (法術士ニュー)

Leader of the Algus Knights magic team. The only one in the Gundam Clan that is able to use magic. At first he refuse to let a human be the leader but later sees Amuro's spirit and accepted Amuro as leader.

Knight Alex (騎士アレックス)

The leader of the Algus Knights before Amuro. Captured by the Munzo Empire, resumed leadership after being freed.

Prince Kamille (カミーユ王子)

Prince of the Algus Kingdom, likes Princess Yuiry of the Munzo Empire.

King Blex (ブレックス王)

King of the Algus Kingdom.

=== Zeon Clan ===
Dark Emperor Sieg Zeon (闇の皇帝ジークジオン)

The emperor of the Zeon Clan. Appears as a floating emblem outside the Moore dimension. His true form is that of a mutated Zakurelo Cat. Returns as evil mastermind in Kikoushin Densetsu.

Devil Satan Gundam/ Monster Black Dragon/ Neo Black Dragon (魔王サタンガンダム/モンスター ブラックドラゴン/ネオブラックドラゴン)

The devil that plans to take over Saddrac World. He was killed by Knight Gundam, who had attained the power of the stone tablet and the three sacred instruments, using the Sword of Flame. His body fell into a volcano but his soul took over Guncannon and later fused with Dragon Baby and the Sword of Flame to be resurrected as Neo Black Dragon.
He is truly half of Superior Dragon. The early setting indicate that he is the product of the evil part of Musha Mark Three that fused with a dragon. In other words Superior Dragon is Musha Mark Three fused with a dragon.

Dragon Baby (ドラゴンベビー)

A miniature version of Black Dragon that calls Black Dragon his father. Fell into the volcano together with the body of Black Dragon. Later returned with the resurrected Neo Black Dragon.

Knight Sazabi (騎士サザビー)

Aide of Satan Gundam.

Sorcerer Messala (呪術士メッサーラ)

Plans to take over Saddrac World by awakening the legendary giant.

High Priest Makube Katze (神官マクベ・カッツェ)

Plans to take over Saddrac World by awakening the legendary giant.

Giant Psycho Golem (巨人サイコゴーレム)

The legendary giant who caused destruction to the world at one time. It was revived with Sieg Zion's power. Originally it has a kind heart and does not like to fight.

Giant Mud Golem (巨人マッドゴーレム)

Fake giants the Zeon Clan built. Mud copies of Psycho Golem.

Fighter Dreissen (闘士ドライセン)

One of the Zeon Three Demons. Holds the Dragon Shield.

Knight Bawoo (騎士バウ)

One of the Zeon Three Demons. Holds the Owl Staff.

Sorcerer Qubeley/ Monster Medusa Qubeley (呪術士キュベレイ/モンスター メデューサキュベレイ)

One of the Zeon Three Demons. Holds the Lion Axe.

Monster The O Dante (モンスター ジオダンテ)

A monster that transformed from the throne of Munzo. It was controlling King Conscon.

=== Munzo Empire ===
King Conscon (コンスコン王)

King of the Munzo Empire. Taken in by the Zeon Clan and under control by The O Dante.

Princess Yuiry (ユイリィ姫)

Princess of the Munzo Empire. Likes Prince Kamille of Algus Kingdom.

== Anime adaptation ==
A four-episode OVA adaptation, titled Mobile Suit SD Gundam: SD Gundam Legend (機動戦士SDガンダム SDガンダム外伝, Kidō Senshi SD Gundam: SD Gundam Gaiden; lit. Mobile Suit SD Gundam: SD Gundam Side Story), was released in 1990 as part of the Mobile Suit SD Gundam series. The OVA features the same voice actors voicing the characters that is based on their character in the mainstream Gundam series.

== Game ==
- SD Gundam Gaiden Lacroan Heroes (Game Boy)
- SD Gundam Gaiden Knight Gundam Monogatari (Famicom)
- SD Gundam Gaiden Knight Gundam Monogatari 2 Knight of Light (Famicom)
