= Kentaro Yano =

Kentaro Yano may refer to:

- Kentaro Yano (mathematician) (1912–1993), Japanese mathematician
- Kentarō Yano (born 1957), Japanese manga artist
