= Battle Spirits: Saikyou Ginga Ultimate Zero =

Japanese anime television series

- 最強銀河究極ゼロ～バトルスピリッツ～
- Created by: Hajime Yatate
- Written by: Atsuhiro Tomioka
- Directed by: Masaki Watanabe
- Music by: Eishi Segawa
- Country of origin: Japan
- Original language: Japanese
- No. of episodes: 49

Production
- Producers: Masato Ota (Nagoya TV); Takuro Nishida (Nagoya TV); Chieko Kusunoki (Nagoya TV); Masayoshi Morita (Sunrise)
- Production companies: Nagoya TV; Sunrise (Note: As of 2015, the copyright for this work was transferred to Bandai Namco Pictures.); ADK

Original release
- Network: ANN (Nagoya TV, TV Asahi)
- Release: September 22, 2013 – September 21, 2014

Related
- Manga
- Written by: Hajime Yatate
- Illustrated by: Masato Ichishiki
- Published by: Shueisha
- Magazine: Saikyo Jump
- Original run: October 2013 – October 2014
- Volumes: 3

Battle Spirits: Saikyō Ginga Ultimate Zero (最強銀河究極ゼロ～バトルスピリッツ～, Saikyō Ginga Arutimetto Zero ~Batoru Supirittsu~; lit. Strongest Galaxy Ultimate Zero ~Battle Spirits~) is a 2013 Japanese anime series based on the Battle Spirits Trading Card Game. It was produced by Sunrise and Nagoya Broadcasting Network and aired on TV Asahi from September 22, 2013, to September 21, 2014 It replaced Battle Spirits: Sword Eyes in the Nichi Asa Kids Time 7:00 timeslot, and was succeeded by Battle Spirits: Burning Soul. It was not released outside Japan until 2019, ViuTV aired this series in Hong Kong with Cantonese dubbing.

This is the last Battle Spirits anime to be animated by Sunrise, as it is aired two years before the founding of Bandai Namco Pictures.

== Plot ==
Card Quester "Rei the Number One Star" is searching for the Ultimate Battle Spirits, a treasure somewhere in space. With him are the mini dragon Mugen, robot Salt, and the April siblings Laila and Rikuto. Rei transforms into Zero while on the battlefield, using different colors and Ultimate cards to defeat his opponents. While he heads toward the Ultimate Battle Spirits, he settles conflicts around the galaxy, befriends various outlaws, and clashes with the Guild, an organization controlling space.

== Characters ==
Rei the Number One Star (一番星のレイ, Ichibanboshi no Rei)
Voiced by: Yūichi Nakamura

The protagonist. Searching for the Ultimate Battle Spirits, 17-year old Rei travels through space in The Number One Star Ship (一番星号, Ichibanboshi gou) with his friends. He is an almost unmatched card battler and is obsessed with the number 1. Generally easygoing, Rei tries to befriend anyone who he battles with. He eats almost nothing but pizza and Stardust Cola filled with ice, and will drink straight from the bottle when he is troubled or sad. He has a fear of ghosts, though he denies it. Rei also has an Ultimate symbol inside of him which guides him to Ultimates, but knows nothing about it. He has no memory of his past and claims to have no interest in remembering it; his earliest memory is of waking up with Ultimate-Siegfried and Ultimate-Odin in hand. After joining up with Kiriga in the Treasure Ship, a physical manifestation of his past self confronts him and forces him to accept his past. At one point, Rei traveled together with Kiriga and Miroku in the Treasure Ship, but lost his memory after sacrificing himself for Kiriga. Despite this, he wants to return to being friends with Miroku.

When playing Battle Spirits, Rei changes forms and personalities according to what color deck he uses.

Zero the Burning (灼熱のゼロ, Shakunetsu no Zero)
Key Cards: Ultimate-Siegfried, Ultimate-Siegfrieden, Ultimate-Siegwurm-Nova
Uses a red deck. Burning has a hot-blooded personality and easily gets fired up. Introduces himself as "The Number One heated guy in space", and his victory phrase is "The Number One Star shines bright red! There's no one stronger than me!"
Zero the Silver (白銀のゼロ, Hakugin no Zero)
Key Cards: Ultimate-Odin, Ultimate-Siegfrieden
Uses a white deck. Silver acts much more rationally than other Zero forms and calls his spirits "my troops". Introduces himself as "The Number One sublime man in space", and his victory phrase is "The Number One Star shines white, let the victory song roar out!"
Zero the Hurricane (疾風のゼロ, Shippū no Zero)
Key Cards: Ultimate-Kingtaurus
Uses a green deck. Hurricane constantly talks about the wind and "whooshes" around the battlefield. His victory phrase is "Smooth sailing, it's a tailwind!"
Zero the Flash (紫電のゼロ, Shiden no Zero)
Key Cards: Ultimate-Beelzebeat
Uses a purple deck. Flash acts gentlemanly and suave in manner and drinks tea during battles. His victory phrase is "Let us meet again in a wonderful hell.".
Zero the Azure (紺碧のゼロ, Konpeki no Zero)
Key Cards: Ultimate-Alexander
Uses a blue deck. Azure talks roughly and uses "ore-sama" to refer to himself. His victory phrase is "No enemy can block the path to my boundless future!"
Zero the Glint (閃光のゼロ, Senkō no Zero)
Key Cards: Ultimate-Rean
Uses a yellow deck. Glint treats battles as a stage performance and speaks in broken English. His victory phrase is "That was Zero the Glint!"
Zero the Ultimate (究極のゼロ, Kyūkyoku no Zero)
Key Cards: Ultimate-Mugendragon, Ultimate-Drian, Ultimate-Chocodra
Uses a red Tri-Dragon Deity/Ultimate Dragon based deck. Unlike other forms, Zero the Ultimate is Rei himself. However, he flashes to other Zeros, Eris, or Kiriga when playing their key cards.

Kiriga the Shooting Star (流れ星のキリガ/キリガ・ザ・シューティングスター, Nagareboshi no Kiriga/Kiriga za Shūtingu Sutā)
Voiced by: Junichi Suwabe
Key Cards: Ultimate-Castle-Golem, Ultimate-Grand-Woden, Ultimate-Odin, Ultimate-Sagitto-Apollodragon

A young man said to be the strongest Card Quester of the Guild. Kiriga travels through space in The Meteor (流星号, Ryuusei gou) with his dragon partner Ian, carrying out orders from Miroku. He is typically calm and collected, but shows a righteous side when dealing with criminals. He views battling as work rather than something to be enjoyed before losing to Rei. Afterwards, he becomes frenzied and gains Ultimate-Grand-Woden, and uses its power to win Rei's Ultimate-Odin. Like Rei, Kiriga has a mysterious symbol inside him and has no memory. However, he begins to regain fragments when battling against Rukinos. He is called by Ultimate-Sagitto-Apollodragon and soon after leaves the Guild to pursue his past, joined by Fairy and Samantha. He at last regains his memory as well as the Treasure Ship after defeating Dulfer. In the past he traveled with Rei and Miroku on the Treasure Ship, and is seen to frequently write poems. Kiriga has three battle forms: blue, white, and red.

Mugen (ムゲン)
Voiced by: Yuka Iguchi

Rei's mini dragon partner. He has a straightforward personality, in contrast to Rei's lax behavior, though is more arrogant. Mugen has the ability to fart at will, typically using this to punish the Triumvirate. He is a big fan of Magical Star Saki, as she resembles his childhood friend Stardra. On his homeworld, he was ostracized for rejecting a human partner. He chooses to go with Rei after being told that he is the "number one bright red" dragon. Mugen transforms into a card when Rei battles, and goes through several evolutions through the series: Mugendra, Mugendragon, Mugendragon-Nova, and Ultimate-Mugendragon.

Rikuto April (リクト・エイプリル, Rikuto Eipuriru)
Voiced by: Rie Kugimiya
Key Cards: Nijinoko, The KnightHero Swordius-Arthur

Laila's younger brother and a novice at Battle Spirits and is 11 years old. Rikuto holds onto the Space Compass, given to him by his grandfather. Rikuto looks up to Rei, and after finding out his goal, asks to come with him as his travelling companion. During Rei's battles, he sometimes launches into an explanatory segment called "Rikuto-sensei's Battle Spirits Lecture". He is a card collector and owns a number of X-Rares, with the KnightHero Swordius-Arthur being one of his favourites, though is not adept at using them.

Laila April (ライラ・エイプリル, Raira Eipuriru)
Voiced by: Mariya Ise
Key Cards: Knight-Pentan

Rikuto's older sister and a Card Quester who along with her younger brother joins Rei as his travelling companion. She is a 15-year-old girl who is a clean freak and insists on keeping the Number One Star Ship tidy. Laila admires Eris, whose father was rivals with her grandfather. She lives by "Laila's Rules" at all times, sometimes announcing them to make others follow her example. She loves Pentans and uses a Pentan deck, with, after advice from Rei, Knight-Pentan as her key spirit.

Salt (ソルト, Soruto)
Voiced by: Jun Fukuyama
Key Cards: The IronHero Saigord-Golem

The Number One Star Ship's cooking robot. Salt makes pizza exclusively, turning even the simplest dishes into pizza. He frequently rhymes and makes puns. Formerly the cook of the COWCOW, but left the ship on a journey to improve his skills. Afterwards, he took on various jobs and was left in a trash heap, where he met Rei. Like Mugen, he is a fan of Magical.

Ian (イアン)
Voiced by: Ryoko Shiraishi

Kiriga's mini dragon partner. Like Kiriga, Ian is very calm, but has a pompous side. He acts as a servant to Kiriga, and is shown to be very caring and loyal to him. Ian transforms into a card when Kiriga battles, and goes through several evolutions through the series: Drian, Star Drian, Meteodrian, and Ultimate-Drian.

Fairy (ファーリー, Fārī)
Voiced by: Yū Serizawa

A student at Amaterasu Academy. Her late father was friends with Kiriga, which leads him to visit her from time to time. During spring break, she and Samantha go with Kiriga to investigate a hint to his memory left by her father. She and Samantha return to school before entering the fourth class of space, though briefly return through Denebola's power. She appears to have a crush on Kiriga.

Samantha (サマンサ, Samansa)
Voiced by: Miyu Kubota

A student at Amaterasu Academy and Fairy's friend. She appears to have extensive technical knowledge and frequently mentions her "ranks" in various skills, notably being a third rank in bomb-making.

Eris the Morning Star (明の明星のエリス, Ake no Hoshi no Erisu)
Voiced by: Yui Horie
Key Cards: Ultimate-Valiero, The HolyDragonEmperor Ultimate-Saviour

A beautiful space pirate famed throughout the galaxy. Searching for the Ultimate Battle Spirits, Eris travels through space in The Venus (ヴィーナス号, Vīnasu gou). She has a strong sense of justice and battles against criminals to regain stolen items, which earns her the admiration of many. Her father had a rivalry with Davil April, leading her to challenge Laila. Eris has no interest in romance, claiming that her love is the sea of space. She is called by Ultimate-Saviour and led to Chocola despite initially not having an Ultimate symbol. Later she takes Miroku's former spot as one of the main pilots of the Treasure Ship. Eris has two battle forms, yellow and red.

Chocola (ショコラ, Shokora)
Voiced by: Saki Fujita

Eris' mini dragon partner. Chocola is hatched after Eris battles Rukinos. She refers to herself as a lady, though is rather childish. She is overly fond of chocolate and all things sweet. Chocola transforms into the spirit card Chocodra when Eris battles, later evolving into Ultimate-Chocodra.

Garbo (ガルボ, Garubo)
Voiced by: Ryoko Shiraishi

A space pirate and Eris' subordinate.

Marlene (マレーネ, Marēne)
Voiced by: Kaori Fukuhara

A space pirate and Eris' subordinate. The youngest of 10 siblings. She is also friends with Rikuto and gifts him Nijinoko.

There are about 30 other unnamed crewmembers aboard The Venus with minor speaking roles.

Miroku (ミロク)
Voiced by: Hiro Shimono
Key Cards: The UltimateHeroDragon Ultimate-Yamato

The main antagonist of the series and boss of the Guild. He wears a visor that covers his eyes and usually speaks through a monitor. Miroku wants the Ultimate Battle Spirits for unknown reasons and has the Guild chase after it. He claims to know all things that happen in space, including Rei's past. He holds Kiriga's memories and uses it to control him. After having Kiriga retrieve the Reverse Galaxy Documents, he summons Rukinos and later Denebola from another dimension. It is revealed that he was a former friend and travelling companion of Rei and Kiriga, who left them thinking that he was bringing them down. In the midst of despair, he accepted Nakes' power and his eyes became blue, purple and white on the left, and green, red, and yellow on the right. Miroku wants everything in the universe and works with Nakes to achieve this.

The Galaxy Triumvirate (銀河三羽がらす, Ginga Sanbagarasu) is a recurring antagonistic group within the Guild that constantly chases after The Number One Star Ship for the Space Compass. The group has to date never won a battle against Rei, despite having collectively battled him nearly 20 times. They are former theater performers from Planet ASAKUSA. They serve under Rukinos and Denebola, and finally Miroku personally after their respective appearances. The group usually provides comic relief within the series.

Watari the Flowing (流しのワタリ, Nagashi no Watari)
Voiced by: Kappei Yamaguchi
Key Cards: The CharismaHero Mibrock-Braver, The IceHero Mibrock-Baragan, Noisy Raven

A short man who plays a ukulele and speaks in a singsong voice. He has a habit of saying "disappointing". He is a big fan of Magical, to the point where he and the Triumvirate once pretend to kidnap her to let her rest. Uses a white Burst deck.

Tsuruhashi the Waking (目覚めのツルハシ, Mezame no Tsuruhashi)
Voiced by: Mamoru Miyano
Key Cards: Slave-GaiAsura, Cape Rocker

A lanky man who speaks entirely in rap and ends his sentences with "YO". Uses a red Awaken deck.

Hashibuto the Angry (怒りのハシブト, Ikari no Hashibuto)
Voiced by: Kenji Nomura
Key Cards: The SevenShogun Beelzebeat, The CurseHero Chaotic-Seimei, Jungle Crow Demon

A heavyset transvestite. Uses a purple Curse deck. Arguably the strongest of the Trumvirate.

A branch of the Guild which is known for its cruelty. It is disbanded when Rei single-handedly defeats all of the members, but is reinstated at the end of the series with Hansoro as an additional member.

Basilla the Dawn (暁のバジーラ, Akatsuki no Bajīra)
Voiced by: Tetsu Inada
Key Cards: Ultimate-Desperado

An antagonist and the boss of the Seven Galaxy Generals. He speaks formally, with many references to meals, and insists that he be called "Lord". He takes the handles from Planet Faucet to use them as weight stones for pickled vegetables, which he loves to eat. After losing against Rei, he relinquishes the handles. Because none of the Seven Galaxy Generals could win a battle with Rei, Basila disbands the group and sets off on a journey. Afterwards, he lovingly grows vegetables on a remote planet until Hansoro finds him and takes his deck. When Hansoro loses his memory, Basilla takes him in and makes him a member of the Eight Galaxy Generals. Uses a purple core removal deck.

Zard the Invincible (不滅のザード, Fumetsu no Zādo)
Voiced by: Masahito Yabe
Key Cards: The EvilSacredBeast Chaos-Pegasuros, The BlackInsectDemonlord Diabolica-Mantis, The DarkDragon Dark Tyrannosaura

An antagonist and second-in-command of the Seven Galaxy Generals. First seen on Planet Ice Cube battling for the Ultimate Crystal there, and is about to claim it for the Guild before Rei shows up and takes it. When the Seven Galaxy Generals are disbanded, Zard resents Basilla, having wanted to become the new boss of the group instead. Along with the Triumvirate, he attempts to steal Rei's decks. He reappears during the Justice Cup, and appears to have reformed his ways. Uses a yellow/green and later red rush deck. He rejoins the Eight Galaxy Generals along with his superior Basilla and new member Hansoro.

Almeida the Evil Eye (邪眼のアルメイダ, Yokoshima me no Arumeida)
Voiced by: Tomoyuki Shimura
Key Cards: The BlackInsectDemonlord Diabolica-Mantis

One of the Seven Galaxy Generals. Almeida rules over the people of Planet Gunrock, making them dig up Crystals in the mines. The Triumvirate trick him into battling Rei, and as a result he loses control of the planet. He teams up with Goin to defeat Rei, but to no avail. Uses a green high speed deck. He later rejoins the Eight Galaxy Generals.

Goin the Bulldozer (ゴリ押しのゴーイン, Gorioshi no Gōin)
Voiced by: Tanuki Sugino
Key Cards: The SevenShogun Asmodios

One of the Seven Galaxy Generals. Goin, like Almeida, is on Planet Gunrock, and attempts to defeat Rei. After losing to Rei, he is forced to leave the planet. Uses a purple deck. He later rejoins the Eight Galaxy Generals.

Gedam the Gale (烈風のゲダム, Reppuu no Gedamu)
Voiced by: Hiroaki Ishikawa

One of the Seven Galaxy Generals. Usually he serves at Basilla's side. Uses a white deck.

Pollock the Drizzling (霧雨のポロック, Kiriame no Porokku)
Voiced by: Masayoshi Sugawara

One of the Seven Galaxy Generals.

Kuulge the Cold Rice (冷や飯のクールゲ, Hiyameshi no Kūruge)

One of the Seven Galaxy Generals. Speaks in grunts. He is from the unnamed water planet in the Third Class.

Hansoro (ハンソ郎, Hansorō)
Voiced by: Shigeo Kiyama
Key Cards: Slave Gai-Asura, The PhantomStarDragon Gai-Asura, Ultimate-Gai-Asura

One of the main antagonists and a high-ranking Guild member who works directly under Miroku. He is called "teacher" by the Triumvirate. After battling Rei and Kiriga, he becomes convinced that the Guild is going in the wrong direction and confronts Miroku. Hansoro is defeated and loses his memory. He goes on a quest to regain his memory, and is taken in by Basilla whom he had formerly defeated. Hansoro becomes the eighth member of the reformed Eight Galaxy Generals, and in the epilogue becomes the new head of the Guild.

Rukinos the Cancer (蟹座のルキノス, Kaniza no Rukinosu)
Voiced by: Yasuhiro Takato
Key Cards: The CancerAstralArmored BraveCancer, The ShellBladeGeneral Legioss

One of the main antagonists and an invader from another dimension that Miroku calls using the Reverse Galaxy Documents. Rukinos' soul possesses a crab doll, and he consumes crab excessively. He destroys the gate to the third class and defeats both Kiriga and Eris, however with the two of them getting revenge later with their newfound Tri-Dragon Deity Ultimates. He participates in the Justice Cup, but loses to Magical. He is used by Miroku to summon Nakes, before being saved by the Trumvirate. Uses a green deck.

Denebola the Leo (獅子座のデネボラ, Shishiza no Denebora)
Voiced by: Yūko Kaida
Key Cards: The LeoAstralArmored LeoBrave, The CarrierEmperor Ridefencer

One of the main antagonists and an invader from another dimension that Miroku calls using the Reverse Galaxy Documents. An acting fanatic, she is egotistical and frequently compares life to a show, of which she is the star. Looking to battle Rei, Denebola goes to the Number One Star Ship and wins against Salt protecting a sick Rikuto, thus taking the Space Compass. She shows up at the Justice Cup, using a fake Compass to bait Rei into a battle. Kiriga eventually regains it after another battle, in which Denebola dramatically confesses her love for him. She is used by Miroku to summon Nakes before being saved by the Trumvirate. Uses a white deck with Ultra Immunity: Blue.

Nakes the Ophiuchus and Reincarnation of Evil World (邪界転生のネイクス, Jakaitensei no Neikusu)
Voiced by: Toshiyuki Morikawa
Key Cards: The SnakeEmperorAstralArmored BravePiooze, Gothic-Grave

An invader from another dimension that Miroku calls by sacrificing Rukinos and Denebola. The embodiment of the 13th zodiac Ophiuchus, sealed away on a distant planet. Nakes gave Miroku power in exchange for his revival, though swallows him after obtaining the Ultimate Battle Spirits. He wants to consume space itself to ease his loneliness, and Zero the Ultimate defeats him. He admits defeat and with Rukinos and Denebola returns to their own dimension.
Planet Greensmothie

Maripoza the Earth (大地のマリポーザ, Daichi no Maripōza)
Voiced by: Emiri Katō
Key Cards: The LightFangPhoenix Rekkuumaru

Leader of Planet Greensmoothie's forest people. Maripoza worships the God of Darkness Bomber, and kidnaps Laila as a sacrifice to him. Her faith was shaken after Rei obtained Ultimate-Kingtaurus, as she became certain that he was the true god. Uses a green deck.

God of Darkness Bomber (暗黒神ボンバー, Ankokushin Bonbā)
Voiced by: Nobuyuki Hiyama
Key Cards: The BlueSkyHero Kung-Wolf

A being worshipped as a god on Planet Greensmoothie. He speaks in grunts. Bomber falls in love with Eris at first sight, and battles for her hand in marriage. However, he loses, and leaves the planet. Uses a green deck.

Banaana (バナーナ, Banāna)
Voiced by: Satomi Arai

A small bird that acts as Bomber's interpreter.

Mob Bomber (モブボンバー, Mobubonbā)
Voiced by: Masayoshi Sugawara (A), Kazuki Moriyama (B)

Followers of Maripoza, dressed in outfits similar to Bomber.
Planet ASAKUSA

Kaneari (カネアリ)
Voiced by: Chafurin

A rich man who employs Rei's services to protect Magical's first ribbon. However, it is discovered that he is a thief and that he stole the ribbon. Kaneari is arrested by ASAKUSA police.
Sargasso Space

Pirate Ship COWCOW

A ship that Salt formerly worked on as cook. Searching for treasure, the crew sailed into the Sargasso ship graveyard. There, they found Ultimate-Beelzebeat's crystal, but were cursed and turned into ghosts; the crew does no realize this until the Number One Star Ship comes their way, however. After Rei lays claim to Ultimate-Beelzebeat, they return to normal. They are cameos of the Japanese comedian group Cowcow. The captain Yoshi (ヨシ) is voiced by Yoshi Yamada, and the crewmate Tada (タダ) is voiced by Kenji Tada.

Sargasso Devil (サルガッソー魔神, Sarugasso Majin)
Voiced by: Mika Matsuoka

The being that caused Sargasso Space to form. Originally, Sargasso Devil was a dish-washing robot that worked for a poor professor. After accidentally dropping the professor's engagement ring down the drain, he fell to despair and started to suck up everything around him. Mugen helps him make the ring resurface with hot water after Sargasso Devil loses to Rei.
Planet Bluestone

The Guardian Bertram (守護神バートラム, Shugoshin Bātoramu)
Voiced by: Masayoshi Sugahara (A), Daichi Hayashi (B), Hidenari Ugaki (C)

The guardian of the shrine that houses a fan said to cure any illness. He tests those who want to obtain it with a Battle Spirits quiz, turning those who fail to answer correctly into stone.

Kon Tone (コン・トーン, Kon Tōn)
Voiced by: Tomomichi Nishimura

The guardian of the Shrine of Chaos which houses Ultimate-Alexander. Appears as a ball of light.

Mirror Zero (鏡のゼロ, Kagami no Zero)
Voiced by: Kōji Yusa

Mirror images of Zero that Rei faces off simultaneously as a trial to obtain Ultimate-Alexander.

Dongoros of the Quintessential Enka (ド演歌のドンゴロス, Do-enka no Dongorosu)
Voiced by: Chō

An enka singer who is more concerned with being popular and making money than putting his heart into song. He abuses the Galactic Law of Battle Spirits to make people buy his CDs when they lose. He tries to obtain Ultimate-Rean so that he can become stronger and force people to buy more.

Ultimate-Siegfrieden (アルティメット・ジークフリーデン, Arutimetto Jīkufurīden)
Voiced by: Kenji Nomura

Found on Planet Ice Cube by Rei. Acknowledges Rei for aiming for number one.

Ultimate-Kingtaurus (アルティメット・キングタウロス, Arutimetto Kingutaurosu)
Voiced by: Nobuyuki Hiyama

Found on Planet Greensmoothie by Rei. Has a very belligerent and impatient personality.

Ultimate-Grand-Woden (アルティメット・グラン・ウォーデン, Arutimetto Guran Uōden)
Voiced by: Hiroki Yasumoto

Found in Sargasso Space by Kiriga. Rejects everyone who tries to obtain him, though acknowledges Kiriga for being persistent.

Ultimate-Beelzebeat (アルティメット・ベルゼビート, Arutimetto Beruzebīto)
Voiced by: Kenji Hamada

Found in Sargasso Space by Rei. Turns the crew of the COWCOW into ghosts, but acknowledges Rei after he beats both Yoshi and Tada.

Ultimate-Alexander (アルティメット・アレクサンダー, Arutimetto Arekuzandā)
Voiced by: Kenjiro Tsuda

Found on Planet Bluestone's Shrine of Chaos by Rei. He was left there by his former master for reasons unknown, and as such refuses to accept Rei as his new master. Rei convinces Ultimate-Alexander to come with him and seek out his master. On Planet Kachidonia, he meets his former master, revealed to be Kiriga. However, Kiriga has no memory of him, and Ultimate-Alexander acknowledges Rei as his new master. Later he is traded back to Kiriga in exchange for Ultimate-Odin.

Ultimate-Rean (アルティメット・リーン, Arutimetto Rīn)
Voiced by: Jun Fukuyama

Found on an unexplored planet by Rei. Shows illusions to people trying to find him, and acknowledges Rei for not running away.

Ultimate-Siegwurm-Nova (アルティメット・ジークヴルム・ノヴァ, Arutimetto Jīkuvurumu Nova)
Voiced by: Taiten Kusunoki

One of the Tri-Dragon Deities that protects the Ultimate Battle Spirits. Fought against the dimensional invaders in the past and comes into Rei's possession with their second coming.

Ultimate-Sagitto-Apollodragon (アルティメット・サジット・アポロドラゴン, Arutimetto Sajitto Aporodoragon)
Voiced by: Mamoru Miyano

One of the Tri-Dragon Deities, found by Kiriga in the Six Color Nebula. He is initially dubious as to whether Kiriga will be sufficiently powerful enough without his memories, but comes into his possession anyway.

The HolyDragonEmperor Ultimate-Savior (聖龍皇アルティメット・セイバー, Seiryuuou Arutimetto Seibā)
Voiced by: Yūko Kaida

One of the Tri-Dragon Deities, found by Eris in a newly-formed nebula. Acknowledges Eris for her devotion to space and sense of justice, and grants her an Ultimate symbol.

Magical Star Saki (マジカルスター咲, Majikarusutā Saki)
Voiced by: Saki Fujita
Key Cards: The WhiteSnakeEmperor Aldius-Viper

The number one idol in space. Her call and response phrases are "Everyone, are we friends??", followed by "Yes! Magical!" On Planet ASAKUSA, Magical is kidnapped by the Triumvirate so that she can rest. However, Mugen challenges them, not knowing their good intentions, and returns her stolen first ribbon. In the Third Class, she hosts an expedition with the crew of the Number One Star Ship on the planet where Ultimate-Rean is lying. Magical becomes enamored of Zero the Glint after seeing his first battle. She also appears at the Justice Cup as both an announcer and a participant.

Justice Tachibana (ジャスティス立花, Jyasutisu Tachibana)
Voiced by: Shinnosuke Tachibana

A galactic charisma and host of the Justice Cup. His call and response phrases are "This is my~", followed by "Justice!!".

Galaxy Watanabe (ギャラクシー渡辺, Gyarakushī Watanabe)
Voiced by: Daisuke Kishio

Guardian of the Ultimate Shrine Void, where the Ultimate Battle Spirits is housed. He is swallowed by Nakes, though is seen alive at the end.

Tohno (トーノ, Tōno)
Voiced by: Akeno Watanabe
Key Cards: The MachineLionDeity Strikewurm-Leo

A friend of Rei and prince of Planet Faucet. Tohno has a kappa-like head, and his emotions go berserk when it is broken. The Seven Galaxy Generals challenge him for one of the handles that controls the water flow, and he loses. He goes to planet Ice Cube to get an Ultimate to take back the handle, where he meets Rei again. Tohno is also a fan of Magical Star Saki.

Riddle (リドル, Ridoru)
Voiced by: Taketora
Key Cards: The DarkDragon Dark-Tyrannosaura

Battles Rei for a crystal in the first episode and loses. Later, he meets Rei again in a Second Class card station, now considering him a friend. Uses a red dark deck.

David April (デイビッド・エイプリル, Deibiddo Eipuriru)
Voiced by: Masashi Hirose

Laila and Rikuto's grandfather who made the space compass. He was a card quester who searched for the Ultimate Battle Spirits, but never found it. David was rivals with Eris' father.

Dulfer (ダルファ, Darufa)
Voiced by: Takehito Koyasu
Key Cards: The ArcAngelia Raraphael

Fairy's deceased father and Kiriga's friend. He is a fan of Magical and uses an Angelia-based deck. A hologram of him guards the Treasure Ship as well as Kiriga's memories.

== Media ==
=== Anime ===
An anime series adaptation aired on TV Asahi from September 22, 2013, to September 20, 2014. It replaced Battle Spirits: Sword Eyes in the 7:00 NichiAsa timeslot.

No.	Title	Original release date
1	"Enter! The Ultimate Number One Star!!" "Tōjō! Arutimetto da Ichibanboshi!!" (Japanese: 登場！アルティメットだ一番星!!)	September 22, 2013
2	"An Ultimate Festival! I Am Zero the Burning!!" "Kyūkyoku Matsuri da! Ore wa Shakunetsu no Zero!!" (Japanese: 究極祭だ！俺は灼熱のゼロ!!)	September 29, 2013
3	"Wasteland Duel! Enter the Seven Galaxy Generals!!" "Arano no Kettō! Ginga Shichi-shō Toujō!!" (Japanese: 荒野の決闘！ 銀河七将登場!!)	October 6, 2013
4	"The Guardian Deity Arrives! I Am Zero the Silver!!" "Shugojin Kita ze! Ore wa Hakugin no Zero!!" (Japanese: 守護神来たぜ!俺は白銀のゼロ!!)	October 13, 2013
5	"Ice Star! Who Is the Ultimate Calling Me?" "Kōri no Hoshi! Ore o Yobu Arutimetto no Koe wa Dare da?" (Japanese: 氷の星!俺を呼ぶ究極の声は誰だ?)	October 20, 2013
6	"Battle Me! Heated Warrior at the Bottom of the Deck!!" "Ore to Tatakae! Dekki no Soko no Atsui Yatsu!!" (Japanese: 俺と戦え!デッキの底の熱い奴!!)	October 27, 2013
7	"Taste it! Another Ultimate User!!" "Ajiwae! Mō Hitori no Arutimetto Tsukai!!" (Japanese: 味わえ!もう一人のアルティメット使い!!)	November 10, 2013
8	"All of Space Shakes! Ultimate vs. Ultimate" "Zen Uchū Gekishin! Arutimetto tai Arutimetto" (Japanese: 全宇宙激震!究極対究極)	November 17, 2013
9	"Green Star! The Ultimate Shooting Star!!" "Midori no Hoshi! Arutimetto da Nagareboshi!!" (Japanese: 緑の星!アルティメットだ流れ星!!)	November 24, 2013
10	"Frightening God of Darkness Bomber!?" "Kyōfu no Ankoku Shin Bonbā!?" (Japanese: 恐怖の暗黒神ボンバー!?)	December 1, 2013
11	"Competition! Who Does the New Ultimate Belong To?!" "Sōdatsusen! Shin Arutimetto wa Dare no Mono!?" (Japanese: 争奪戦!新アルティメットは誰の物!?)	December 8, 2013
12	"Decision!? Strongest in the Galaxy!!" "Kettei!? Ginga de Ichiban Tsuyoi Yatsu" (Japanese: 決定!?銀河で一番強いヤツ!!)	December 15, 2013
13	"Shining Star! Female Pirate vs. Number One Star!" "Kagayaku Hoshi! Onna Kaizoku Tai Ichibanboshi!" (Japanese: 輝く星!女海賊対一番星!)	December 22, 2013
14	"Mugen's Hard Struggle! The Target Is Magical!!" "Mugen Funtō! Nerawareta Majikaru!!" (Japanese: ムゲン奮闘!狙われたマジカル!!)	January 5, 2014
15	"Rikuto Runs Away!? The Galaxy's Biggest Sister/Brother Quarrel!" "Rikuto Iede!? Ginga Saidai no Kyōdai Genka!" (Japanese: リクト家出!?銀河最大の姉弟ゲンカ!)	January 12, 2014
16	"Revenge! Shooting Star vs. Number One Star" "Ribenji! Nagareboshi tai Ichibanboshi" (Japanese: リベンジ!流れ星対一番星)	January 19, 2014
17	"Release! The Cursed COWCOW" "Kaihō seyo! Norowareta COWCOW-gō" (Japanese: 解放せよ!呪われたCOWCOW号)	January 26, 2014
18	"Slip Away! The Frightening Space Graveyard!" "Nukedase! Kyōfu no Uchū Hakaba!" (Japanese: 抜け出せ!恐怖の宇宙墓場!)	February 2, 2014
19	"Kiriga's Memory!? A Mysterious Girl Appears!" "Kiriga no Kioku!? Nazo no Shōjo Arawareru!" (Japanese: キリガの記憶!?謎の少女現る!)	February 9, 2014
20	"Zero Urgently Hospitalized! Unsteady Symbol!" "Kinkyū Nyūin Zero! Ayaushi Shinboru!" (Japanese: 緊急入院ゼロ!危うしシンボル!)	February 16, 2014
21	"Zero is 4 People!? Challenge the Other Selves to Battle!" "Zero ga Yonin!? Charenji Bunshin Batoru!" (Japanese: ゼロが4人!?チャレンジ分身バトル!)	February 23, 2014
22	"The Galaxy's Strongest Ultimate Rikuto! Huh!?" "Saikyō Ginga Arutimetto Rikuto! E!?" (Japanese: 最強銀河究極リクト!え!?)	March 2, 2014
23	"Ultimate Bodyguard Confrontation!" "Arutimetto Yōjinbō Taiketsu!" (Japanese: アルティメット用心棒対決!)	March 9, 2014
24	"Ultimate Supernova! Roar, Nova!!" "Kyūkyoku Chōshinsei! Nova Hoeru!!" (Japanese: 究極超新星!ノヴァ吼える!!)	March 16, 2014
25	"Cross the Gate! Nova vs. Gai-Asura!" "Gēto o Koero! Nova tai Gai Asura!" (Japanese: ゲートを超えろ!ノヴァ対ガイ・アスラ!)	March 23, 2014
26	"Great Clash! Ultimate vs. Reverse 12 Zodiac Brave" "Dai Gekitotsu! Kyūkyoku tai Ura Jūnikyū Bureivu" (Japanese: 大激突!究極対裏12宮ブレイヴ)	March 30, 2014
27	"Eris in Danger! Great Attack of the Reverse 12 Zodiac Braves!" "Erisu Ayaushi! Ura Jūnikyū Bureivu Dai Shūgeki!" (Japanese: エリス危うし!裏12宮ブレイヴ大襲撃!)	April 6, 2014
28	"Enter the Tri-Dragon Deity! Kiriga's New Power!" "San Ryūjin Tōjō! Kiriga no Arata na Chikara!" (Japanese: 三龍神登場!キリガの新たな力!)	April 13, 2014
29	"Bright Red Kiriga's Grand Uprising!" "Makkana Kiriga no Dai Hanran!" (Japanese: 真っ赤なキリガの大反乱!)	April 20, 2014
30	"A Star Enters! It's Zero the Glint!" "Sutā Tōjō! Senkō no Zero dēsu!" (Japanese: スター登場!閃光のゼロでーす!)	April 27, 2014
31	"The Third Red Dragon! Time for the Heart's Symbol to Shine!!" "Santaime no Akaki Ryū! Shinboru Mune ni Hikaru Toki!!" (Japanese: 三体目の赤き龍!シンボル胸に光る時!)	May 4, 2014
32	"Great Star of the Reverse 12 Zodiacs!? Challenge from Leo!!" "Ura Jūnikyū no Dai Sutā!? Shishiza kara no Chōsen!!" (Japanese: 裏12宮の大スター!? しし座からの挑戦!!)	May 11, 2014
33	"Farewell Laila" "Sayonara Raira" (Japanese: さよなら ライラ)	May 18, 2014
34	"The Galaxy's Strongest Detective Rikuto- Huh!?" "Saikyō Ginga Meitantei Rikuto – E!?" (Japanese: 最強銀河名探偵リクト え！？)	May 25, 2014
35	"Comet Assault! Ultimate Breakthrough!" "Suisei Totsugeki! Kyūkyoku Daihakken!" (Japanese: 彗星突撃！ 究極大発見！)	June 1, 2014
36	"Runaway Mugen!? I Don't Need Your Opinion, Number One Star" "Bōsō Mugen!? Goiken Muyō, Ichibanboshi" (Japanese: 暴走ムゲン！？ ご意見無用、一番星)	June 8, 2014
37	"Aim for the Top! The Justice Cup Tournament Begins" "Chōten o Mezase! Jasutisu Kappu Kaimaku" (Japanese: 頂点を目指せ!ジャスティスカップ開幕)	June 22, 2014
38	"Grand Battle! The Triumvirate of Love and Friendship" "Dai Gekisen! Ai to Yūjō no Sanbagarasu!" (Japanese: 大激戦!愛と友情の三羽がらす!)	June 29, 2014
39	"Wow! This Is My Partner!?" "Uwaa! Ore no Aibō ga Konna Koto ni!?" (Japanese: うわあ!俺の相棒がこんな事に!?)	July 6, 2014
40	"The Omnipotent Miroku!" "Zenchizennō no Miroku!" (Japanese: 全知全能のミロク!)	July 13, 2014
41	"The Galaxy's Greatest Clash! Me vs. Myself!!" "Ginga Saidai no Gekitotsu! Ore tai Ore-sama!!" (Japanese: 銀河最大の激突!俺対オレ様!!)	July 20, 2014
42	"Miroku Gets Serious? The Nightmare Deck Is Laughing!" "Miroku no Honki? Akumu no Dekki ga Warau!" (Japanese: ミロクの本気?悪夢のデッキが笑う!)	July 27, 2014
43	"Creeping Fear! Ophiuchus Is Coming!!" "Shinobiyoru Kyōfu! Hebitsukaiza ga Kuru!!" (Japanese: しのびよる恐怖!蛇遣い座がくる!!)	August 10, 2014
44	"The Worst Battle! Arrival of Nakes!!" "Saiyaku Batoru! Neikusu Shutsugen!!" (Japanese: 最凶バトル!ネイクス出現!!)	August 17, 2014
45	"Grand Appearance! The Ultimate Battle Spirits!!" "Dai Shutsugen! Kyūkyoku no Batosupi!!" (Japanese: 大出現!究極のバトスピ!!)	August 24, 2014
46	"Bottomless Darkness! Nakes Great Rampage!!" "Sokoshirenu Yami! Neikusu Dai Bousou!!" (Japanese: 底知れぬ闇!ネイクス大暴走!!)	August 31, 2014
47	"Shooting Star, Twinkle! Kiriga's Battle of Friendship!!" "Nagareboshi, Mabataite! Kiriga Yūjō no Batoru!!" (Japanese: 流れ星、瞬いて!キリガ友情のバトル!!)	September 7, 2014
48	"Rei the Number One Star, That Is the Ultimate Zero!!" "Ichibanboshi no Rei, Sore wa Kyūkyoku no Zero!!" (Japanese: 一番星のレイ、それは究極のゼロ!!)	September 14, 2014
49	"Everyone Is Number One! Ultimate Serious Friends!!" "Minna Ichiban! Arutimetto na Majidachi da!!" (Japanese: みんな一番!アルティメットなマジダチだ!!)	September 21, 2014

=== Music ===
Opening themes

- "I Wish"
  - Lyrics/Composition: Ogawa Yuya
  - Arrangement/Performance: BACKDRAFT SMITHS
  - Episodes: 1-25, 49 (ending theme)
- "ZERO"
  - Lyrics: Kotoko
  - Composition: Noriyuki Asakura
  - Arrangement: Yasutaka Kume
  - Performance: Tatsuyuki Kobayashi
  - Episodes: 26–49

Ending themes

- "Nostalgia"
  - Lyrics: Niho Karasawa
  - Composition/Arrangement: Yusuke Katō
  - Performance: Kato*Fuku (Emiri Katō & Kaori Fukuhara)
  - Episodes: 1–26
- "Playful Sun" (徒太陽, "Itazura Taiyou")
  - Lyrics: ACKO
  - Composition/Arrangement: Rui Nagai
  - Performance: i☆Ris
  - Episodes: 26–37
- Endless NOVA
  - Lyrics: Aki Hata
  - Composition/Arrangement: Seima Iwahashi
  - Performance: AG7 (Shuhei Kita, Himeka, Sayaka Sasaki, Marina Kawano, Konomi Suzuki, Natsumi Okamoto, Tatsuyuki Kobayashi)
  - Episodes: 38–48

=== Manga ===
A manga version by Masato Ichishiki was serialized in Saikyo Jump magazine beginning in October 2013. The chapter titles are written entirely in English words. Each chapter is referred to as a "Turn."

No.	Japanese release date	Japanese ISBN
1	January 4, 2014	978-4088800059
01. "Ultimate-Trigger, Lock On!" (アルティメットトリガー・ロックオン!, Arutimettotorigā Rokkuon!); 02. "White Army, Take Off!" (ホワイトアーミー・テイクオフ!, Howaito Āmī Teikuofu!); 03. "Ultimate-Siegfrieden!!" (アルティメット・ジークフリーデン!!, Arutimetto Jīkufurīden!!); 04. "Crystal of Greensmoothie" (クリスタル・オブ・グリーンスムージー, Kurisutaru Obu Gurīnsumūjī); "Saikyo Preview Manga: Saikyou Ginga Ultimate Zero" (最強予告漫画 最強銀河究極ゼロ, "Saikyõ Yokoku Manga Saikyou Ginga Arutimetto Zero"); "Side Story: Work Hard! Galaxy Triumvirate!!" (番外編 がんばれ!銀河三羽がらす!!, "Saikyõ Yokoku Manga Saikyou Ginga Arutimetto Zero")
2	May 2, 2014	978-4088800660
05. "Kiriga the Shooting Star" (キリガ・ザ・シューティングスター, Kiriga za Shūtingu Sutā); 06. "Purple Gentleman" (パープルジェントルマン, Pāpuru Jentoruman); 07. "Rei VS Kiriga, The First Battle!!" (レイVSキリガ ザ・ファースト・バトル!!, Rei Bāsasu Kiriga Za Fāsuto Batoru!!); 08. "Ultimate-Siegwurm-Nova!!" (アルティメット・ジークヴルム・ノヴァ!!, Arutimetto Jīkuvurumu Nova!!); "Saikyou Ginga Ultimate Zero Battle Spirits VS Spicy! Curry Prince: Ultimate Collaboration Wars" (最強銀河究極ゼロバトルスピリッツVS激辛!カレー王子究極コラボウォーズ, Saikyō Ginga Arutimetto Zero Batoru Supirittsu Bāsasu Gekikara! Karē Ōji Arutimetto Korabo Wōzu)
3	October 3, 2014	978-4088801889
