= Rangers Strike =

Japanese trading card game

- Manufacturers: Bandai
- Publishers: Carddass
- Years active: 2006-2011
- Players: 2
- Chance: Some
- Skills: Card playing Arithmetic; Basic reading ability

Rangers Strike (レンジャーズストライク, Renjāzu Sutoraiku) is a Japanese trading card game created by Carddass initially based upon Toei's Super Sentai Series television franchise. It was released in 2006 in commemoration of the Super Sentai series' 30th anniversary. The game was expanded with several expansion packs, such as The Masked Rider Expansion (ザ・マスクドライダーEXP, Za Masukudo Raidā EXP) collection in 2007, featuring characters from the Kamen Rider Series television franchise, and the Special Metal Edition (スペシャルメタルエディション, Supesharu Metaru Edishon) in 2008 featuring characters from the Metal Hero Series television franchise. The new X Gather (クロスギャザー, Kurosu Gyazā) expansions feature characters from the Super Sentai, Kamen Rider, and Metal Hero Series, and other TV series based on works by Shotaro Ishinomori (Robocon, Kikaider, and Inazuman).
