= Musha Senki Hakari no Hengen Hen =

Japanese media franchise

The title logo

Musha Senki Hikari no Hengen Hen (ムシャ戦記 光の変幻編; lit. 'Musha Chronicle Light Transformation Chapter') is the eleventh work of the Musha Gundam series. The title of the Comic Bom Bom version is Shin Musha Gundam Musha Senki Hikari no Hengen Hen (新武者ガンダム ムシャ戦記 光の変幻編; lit. 'New Musha Gundam: Musha Chronicle Light Transformation Chapter'). Running period, 1999 to 2000.

== Outline ==
For this work the series title changed from "SD Sengokuden" to "Musha Senki" but so far Hikari no Hengen Hen is the only work in the series. The time frame of this work is the distant future from the SD Sengokuden timeline. The characters of this work is largely derived from the mechanical designs of Mobile Report Gundam W: Endless Waltz. The characters' names are written in katakana unlike the use of ateji in the previous works.

First Gundam Daishougun and Wing Zero

== Story ==
Under the rule of the Daishougun, the Gundam Army had always protected the peace of the country. But now a group called Tenma Army appeared and the group is spreading their claws across the land, ready to stage a revolt. The Gundam Army had a tough time fending off the Tenma Army. Thus the Daishougun started Touma Koujin Tai(Kidou Resshi Tai in the Bom Bom version), a special task force to seek out and destroy the Tenma Army. Musha Wing Zero was transformed to a child called Hanemaru by Youjutsushi Hydra while fending off the Tenma Army. Hanemaru followed the Touma Koujin Tai who found him injured in the ruins of the village. During the period he changes to Musha Wing Zero to help out the group. Later Wing Zero found out that his sister is alive and in the hands of the Tenma Army, in the process of saving his sister, Hanemaru regained his past memory and regained his form of Wing Zero. But the true goal of Hydra is to bring forth the Tenma Taitei, the true origin of all the evil the musha gundams had fought. With the power of the custom weapons of the Koujin Tai and the miracle of the stars Wing Zero and the Daishougun defeated Tenma Taitei and brought peace to the land once again.

== Characters ==
=== Gundam Army ===
Hanemaru/ Musha Wing Zero (羽丸/武者ウイングゼロ)

- Design basis: Wing Gundam Zero Custom

A musha reverted to his child form by the witchcraft of Youjutsushi Hydra. He is able to return to Wing Zero when the Kokoro no Tama(心の玉) shines. At first the consciousness of both Hanemaru and Wing Zero are separated, Hanemaru would have no memory of being Wing Zero. But later when Hanemaru regained his memory, he realised that he and Wing Zero are truly one and the same and after defeating Youjutsushi Hydra he broke the spell and permanently regain his original form. Wing Zero is fighting the Tenma Army to avenge his sister but actually his sister is still alive in the hands of the Tenma Army.
Hanemaru was saved by the Koujin Tai and became part of the group by the order of the Daishougun. During his stint in the group he followed the group on missions and changed to Wing Zero secretly to "help out". Wing Zero was asked to join the group a few times but he rejected their offer. Slowly he came to accept them and worked with them. He is able to equip the custom weapons of the Koujin Tai and utilize their power.
In the Comic World version, Wing Zero is normally Hanemaru and secretly transforms into Wing Zero in order to aid the Gundams during difficult battles. Also he transform to his own custom musha form which is unseen in the Bom Bom version.

==== Touma Koujin Tai/ Kidou Resshi Tai (討魔光刃隊/機動烈士隊) ====
Musha Sandrock (武者サンドロック)
- Design basis: Gundam Sandrock Custom

The leader of the group. He comes from a musha family and is a talented individual in both literary and military arts. Childhood name Yaibamaru(刃丸). He is a practitioner of the Shichisei Tenken Ryuu(七星天剣流). His custom weapon is the Twin Swords Homura(双刀・炎) which can change to a few forms when combined.

Musha Deathscythe (武者デスサイズ)
- Design basis: Gundam Deathscythe Hell Custom

A musha from a ninja village. Childhood name Shinobimaru(忍丸). His custom weapon is the Shinobi Cloak(忍クローク). His main weapon the large scythe, Ressaiga(列砕牙).
When a mysterious series of killings began, Deathscythe became a prime suspect because he uses the same weapon the assailant used as sighted by an eyewitness, but he secretly investigates and defeated the true culprit - Majin Gundam, clearing his name.
In the Comic World version, he is seen shapshifting to his child form. In the Bom Bom version, he dislikes Wing Zero for his cocky, almighty behaviour.

Musha Heavyarms (武者ヘビーアームズ)
- Design basis: Gundam Heavyarms Custom

The genius strategist of the group, he is said to be able to accurately predict the enemy's strategy beforehand. Skilled in firearms. Childhood name Todorokimaru(轟丸). His custom weapon is the Todoroki Jyuukou(轟重甲).

Musha Nataku (武者ナタク)
- Design basis: Altron Gundam Custom

A machine musha programmed with a heart of justice. His custom weapon is the Dragon Hang(竜撃ハング). His custom musha form is a real type musha. Skilled in using his lance.
In the Comic World version, it is revealed that he was called Natabou(ナタ坊) before being upgraded to a combat use machine musha.

First Gundam Daishougun (ファーストガンダム大将軍)

- Design basis: Gundam

The overall commanding general of the Gundam Army. He is the originator of the custom weapons and custom musha. He is the travelling musha who met the fatally injured Hanemaru and infused one of the Gundam Crystals-the Kokoro no Tama into Hanemaru to revive him in the past. He combines with his custom battlesteed Shiroganeoh(白鋼王) to become his custom musha form.

Shoumusha Wind (将武者 宇印土)

- Design basis: Tallgeese III

Aide of the Daishougun and also the commander of the Koujin Tai. His residence acts as the base for the Koujin Tai.

=== Others ===
Ayano (綾乃)

Younger sister of Wing Zero. A miko with extraordinary powers. She was believed to be dead but was actually still alive in captive by the Tenma Army. She was used to power a new kind of puppet musha to fight against Wing Zero and the Koujin Tai. It was revealed that was captured to be the sacrifice to call forth the Tenma Taitei from the Gate of Darkness but that was foiled by the quick thinking of Okinu.
When they were young Wing Zero saved her from an ogre and was fatally wounded.
Ayano has only appeared in the Bom Bom version.

Okinu (お絹)

A feisty girl saved along with some villagers by Hanemaru in an unofficial Koujin Tai mission. She and the villagers were forced to work in the gold mine of the Tenma Army. During the battle she witnessed Hanemaru changing to Wing Zero. Since then she has been "training" and urging Hanemaru to master the transformation so that he could transform. With her quick thinking she switched places with Ayano and foiled Hydra's plan. She looks almost like twins with Ayano.
Currently she lives in Wind's residence with Hanemaru and the Koujin Tai, taking care of the household matters.
Okinu has only appeared in the Bom Bom version.

Shodai Daishougun
Nidaime Daishougun
Sandaime Daishougun
Yondaime Daishougun
Shinsei Daishougun
Victory Daishougun
V-ou Daishougun

The past Daishougun who appeared to encourage Wing Zero and First Gundam Daishougun and to guide them to use the power of the planetary alignment.

=== Tenma Army (天魔軍団) ===
Youjutsushi Hydra/ Goushou Hydra (妖術師ハイドラ/豪将ハイドラ)

- Design basis: Hydra Gundam

The one responsible for turning Wing Zero to Hanemaru. Tenma Army's leader with the double personality of a witchcraft user and a warrior (the witchcraft user has a Zeong-like face while the warrior has a Gundam face). He revived the past warriors of darkness with the aim to call forth the Tenma Taitei.

Efreet (イフリート)

- Design basis: Efreet Kai

A member of the Tenma Army. His group is in charge of protecting the egg of Kuromajin but when the Koujin Tai attacked he was wounded badly and sacrificed himself to revive Kuromajin.
Appeared only in the Bom Bom version.

Gyan (ギャン)

- Design basis: Gyan

A member of the Tenma Army. Has wings that grant him the ability of flight.
Appeared only in the Bom Bom version.

Kagehoushi Tomliat (影法師ドムットリア)

- Design basis: Tomliat

A member of the Tenma Army. Skilled in the art of using shadows.
Appeared only in the Bom Bom version.

Koryuu, Hakuryuu, Seiryuu, Sekiryuu (黒龍,白龍,青龍,赤龍)

- Design basis: Serpant

Commanders of the infantry troops.

Youjyuu Apsalus (妖獣アプサラス)

- Design basis: Apsalus II

A four-legged demon beast capable of dealing snow blasts.
Appeared only in the Bom Bom version.

Puppet Musha

- Design basis: Mass Production Type Big Zam

A giant musha which levitates and uses its legs as arms to attack. It also possess a power cannon in its body. The unconscious Ayano is placed in it to power it and it attacks according to Hydra's commands.
Appeared only in the Bom Bom version.

Majin Gundam

Antagonist from Chou SD Sengokuden Touba Daishougun. He was revived and started attacking rest points of the guards, killing them. Later due to his incomplete revival he was defeated by Deathscythe.
Appeared only in the Bom Bom version.

Master Daishougun

Antagonist from Shin SD Sengokuden Chou Kidou Daishougun Hen. He has been hiding underground waiting for the right time to attack. He appeared when Hydra was defeated, initially he is to work towards the goal to call forth Tenma Taitei but he has his own ambition to seize the land as his own and betrayed Hydra. Wing Zero fought against him but was of no match. At last he was beheaded by First Gundam Daishougun.
But this betrayal was foresighted by Youjutsushi Hydra and Master's death was used as the sacrifice to call forth Tenma Taitei.
Appeared only in the Bom Bom version.

Rashou Heavens
Rashou Grand
Rashou Walter
Gattai Rashou Fuunsaiki

Master's subordinates, they combine to form Fuunsaiki.
Appeared only in the Bom Bom version.

Kuromajin Yamikoutei
Batou Musha Mazaku
Gakisei Yamishougun
Yamitaitei
Shin Yami Gensui
Orochi Big Zam

The beings of darkness from the past summoned by Tenma Taitei to fight the group.
Appeared only in the Bom Bom version.

Tenma Taitei (天魔大帝)

The ruler of Space, a being of darkness. He revealed that he is the instigating mastermind behind all the past battles fought in the previous works and all the beings of darkness that appeared in previous works were all his underlings. A powerful giant being that can crush a planet with his bare hand.
He was defeated by the gigantic Wing Zero and the Daishougun who gained the power from the miracle cross alignment of the planets.

== Glossary ==
Custom Weapons (カスタム武具)

Special weapons handed to the Koujin Tai by First Gundam Daishougun. Wing Zero is able to equip all of them and use their power.

Custom Musha (カスタム武者)

Musha who own Custom Weapons and know how to use their powers.

== Models ==
The series produced a series of six model kits. Of these, five were based on After Colony designs and one was based on a Universal Century design. The overall gimmick for the line was that the Custom Weapons of the kits could be shared and combined amongst one another. Most of the kits also came with a figurine of the child version of the character.

- BB 192 Musha Wing Zero- Able to transform into a Bird Mode (notable as it is based on the Wing Zero Custom, the only design in the Wing Gundam family to lack a Bird Mode)
- BB 194 Musha Nataku - Able to transform into a 1/144 'real type' Musha Nataku
- BB 195 Musha Heavyarms - Wields various firearms and comes with a half mask
- BB 196 Musha Sandrock - Wields two large swords
- BB 197 Musha Deathscythe - Has a removable cloak and scythe
- BB 199 First Gundam Dai-Shogun - Based on the RX-78-2 Gundam. Rides a horse (based on the White Base, the RX-78-2's companion ship in Mobile Suit Gundam) with which it can combine for a similar gimmick as Nataku. The kit was soon after re-released with slight colour and sticker changes as BB 213 Kihei Musha Gundam.

== Trivia ==
- This work may be looked upon as the final chapter of the SD Sengokuden series. There is the return of the past villains and heroes and the final defeat of the root of all evil in the series.
