= SD Gundam World Sangoku Soketsuden =

Japanese media franchise

SDガンダムワールド 三国創傑伝 (SD Gandamu Wārudo Sangoku Sōketsuden)
- Genre: Mecha, Action, adventure
- Created by: Hajime Yatate; Yoshiyuki Tomino
- Manga

SD Gundam World Sangoku Sōketsuden: Enkotan
- Written by: Takuya Yamanaka
- Illustrated by: Naoto Tsushima
- Published by: Sunrise
- English publisher: NA: Sunrise
- Original run: April 2019 – present
- Manga

SD Gundam World Sangoku Sōketsuden: Sōshōki
- Written by: Takuya Yamanaka
- Illustrated by: Luk Mo Shek
- Published by: Explorer Publishing
- English publisher: NA: Sunrise
- Magazine: Lucky
- Original run: April 2019 – present
- Anime television series
- Directed by: Takahiro Ikezoe
- Written by: Touko Machida
- Music by: Tomotaka Ohsumi
- Studio: Sunrise
- Licensed by: NA: Sunrise
- Original network: BS11, Tokyo MX
- Original run: July 26, 2019 – March 25, 2021
- Episodes: 10

SD Gundam World Sangoku Soketsuden (Japanese: SDガンダムワールド 三国創傑伝, Hepburn: SD Gandamu Wārudo Sangoku Sōketsuden) is a Japanese media project by Sunrise and Bandai Spirits and a reboot of the BB Senshi Sangokuden franchise, based on the long-running Gundam media franchise. Created to celebrate the 40th anniversary of Gundam, it is also loosely based on the 14th century Chinese historical novel Romance of the Three Kingdoms by Luo Guanzhong. However, Sangoku Soketsuden is different from BB Senshi Sangokuden in its theming and story. It is later succeeded by SD Gundam World Heroes.

An original net anime adaptation by Sunrise premiered online from July 26, 2019, to March 25, 2021. Two print side stories by Takuya Yamanaka were announced to be released in their respective magazines.

== Plot ==
In a distant future, a devastating war once ravaged the land of Mirsha to ruins. As when the land is about to recover from the devastation, the mobile citizens all encountered a mysterious virus called the "Etiolation Trinity", which an epidemic broke out and caused them to become mindless monsters called Bugs. Due to the fears of the virus, mobile citizens now live in three areas, each cities all sealed up in walls and pray that the Trinity, a mysterious energy can save them. But behind one of the walls, Lord Dong Zhuo Providence of Luoyang has been acting in an outrageous manner since the passing of the previous lord. In order to liberate the citizens from the Etiolation Trinity, a valiant hero named Liu Bei Unicorn Gundam steps up alongside Guan Yu Nu Gundam and Zhang Fei God Gundam to bring a new change to the world.

== Media ==
=== Merchandise ===
SD Gundam World Sangoku Soketsuden was first announced back in November 21, 2018, at the Gundam 40th Anniversary live press conference. Created as a reboot of the BB Senshi Sangokuden franchise (a spinoff of the Musha Gundam series and part of the SD Gundam franchise), the series only shares its namesake from its other franchise as it was an entirely different series altogether.

Merchandising for the series will be released under Bandai's long running Gunpla line of model kits under the BB Senshi label.

=== Anime ===
An original net anime adaptation of the franchise is produced by Sunrise and aired on July 26, 2019. It is directed by Takahiro Ikezoe and Touko Machida, the creative duo behind Show by Rock!!. The opening theme is titled "Removes" by Swanky Dank, while the ending is titled "TRI-ALIVE" by Kirisame Undertaker.

The premiere of episodes beyond episode 7 on the Gundam.Info YouTube channel and Crunchyroll was postponed on February 28, 2020, due to "various circumstances". During the opening ceremony for the Gunpla Expo Tokyo 2020 event, it was announced the series would make its Japanese streaming debut on the Gundam Channel YouTube channel. The Japanese television debut was announced for BS11 on February 26, 2021, and Tokyo MX on March 22, 2021. The series was only available in 14 countries and territories prior to that, including Hong Kong, Taiwan, South Korea, the United States, and Italy. On February 10, 2021, it was announced overseas streaming for the series would continue with the premiere of episode 8 on March 18, 2021, on Gundam.info and Crunchyroll.

The sequel series, SD Gundam World Heroes, is planned for a worldwide release in April 2021. In Japan, the series will stream on the Gundam Channel with TV airings on BS11 and Tokyo MX.

=== Print ===
Two sidestories by Takuya Yamanaka were announced to begin serialization. The sidestory manhua titled SD Gundam World Sangoku Soketsuden: Sōshōki (Japanese: SDガンダムワールド 三国創傑伝 蒼翔記, Hepburn: SD Gandamu Wārudo Sangoku Sōketsuden Sōshōki) will begin serialization on the Chinese comic magazine Lucky in April 2018. It is to be illustrated by Luk Mo Shek. A webcomic sidestory titled SD Gundam World Sangoku Soketsuden: Enkotan (Japanese: SDガンダムワールド 三国創傑伝 焔虎譚, Hepburn: SD Gandamu Wārudo Sangoku Sōketsuden Enkotan) will begin publishing on Sunrise's official website. It will be illustrated by Naoto Tsushima.

Preceded by Mobile Suit Gundam Narrative	Gundam metaseries (production order); 2019	Succeeded by Gundam Build Divers Re:Rise
