= SD Sengokuden Fuurinkazan Hen =

The title logo

SD Sengokuden Fuurinkazan Hen (SD戦国伝 風林火山編, lit. SD Warring States: The Wind, Forest, Fire and Mountain Chapter) is the second work of the Musha Gundam series.

This story continues forward 15 years from Musha Sichinin Shuu Hen where some of the characters are promoted. Running period, 1991.

== Story ==
In the explosion caused by the clash between Nidaime Daishougun and Yami Koutei, five fragments of Light and five fragments of Darkness are scattered. One of the Light fragments came to possession of a young child. This young child grow up to become Musha Alex and he went on a journey to seek the remaining four owners of the Light fragments. However, when the five warriors of Light gather, five warriors of Darkness gather too reviving the Yami Shougun. With all the Gundams present they execute the Octogram Formation(八紘の陣). Sandaime Daishougun smashes the armour of Yami Shougun. But from it Alex saw the vengeful spirit of Yami Shougun. A huge explosion occurs and Alex is blown away, to another time.

== Characters ==
Alex and the Octogram Formation

=== Gundam Army (頑駄無軍団, Gundamu Gundan) ===
==== The New Five Mushas (新生武者五人衆, Shinsei Musha Gonin Shuu) ====
Musha Alex/Alegorou (武者荒烈駆主/荒五郎)

- Design basis: Gundam NT-1

Chosen holder of the light fragment "Asu (meaning the one who sever evil)". He was the baby Noomaru found when he follow one of the Light fragments. Noomaru then adopted the baby calling him Alegorou. "Asu" comes from the romanisation of Earth(Aasu). He sets off to find the other Light fragments which will give Sandaime Daishougun the power to defeat the revived Dark Army. He dorns the Bushin no Yoroi upon the call "Bushin Gisou" and has the ability to change to Centuarous form.

Musha Plus (武者風雷主)

- Design basis: Zeta Plus

Chosen holder of the light fragment "Maki (meaning the winged one)". Raised as the son of a hunter. Also the disciple of Hayate no Nyu. "Maki" comes from the name of the planet Mercury. Combines with support mecha Buraioh (which is a form of the Maki fragment) to change to the Hasouki Waverider. Would later inherit the Kaze no Yoroi from Nyu becoming Hayate no Plus.

Musha Eisu (武者江須)

- Design basis: S Gundam

Chosen holder of the light fragment "Ma (meaning the brave one)". He came out in search of the Armours of the Four Devas on instruction of his father, the head priest of the Yontenshin Shrine. Became the disciple of Kean no Double Zeta. "Ma" comes from the name of the planet Mars. Has since possess supernatural powers at a young age. He keeps the Light fragment as an amulet. Equips the Ryuwa no Yoroi on the command "Ryuwa Gisou". The Ryuwa no Yoroi and his other armament combine to form Raijingou (looks like G Cruiser). Later inherits the Hi no Yoroi from Double Zeta becoming Kaen no Eisu.

Musha Hyakushikikai (武者百士鬼改)

- Design basis: Hyaku Shiki Kai

Chosen holder of the light fragment "Vi (meaning the one who brings peace)". The son of Hyakushiki and Kyuberei. Possess the swordsman skills from his father and ninja skills from his mother. Learnt nitouryu from the then training Mitsurin no Mark Two. "Vi" comes from Venus. A very kind person, he had saved animals from a volcano eruption. The Vi fragment enables a part of his support mecha, Twin Buster, to combine with him. Giving him flight ability. Would later succeed the Mitsurin no Yoroi from Mark Two to become Mitsurin no Hyakushikikai.

Musha Psycho Mark Two (武者砕虎摩亜屈)

- Design basis: Psyco Gundam Mk-II

Chosen holder of the light fragment "Jyu (meaning the enormous one)". Younger brother of Kyosan no Psycho, son of Sai Gundam. "Jyu" comes from Jupiter. Disappointed in his brother who was defeated by Nyu he went to the Dark Army. Although he was chosen by a Light fragment, he was also at the same time chosen by a Dark fragment. The Light fragment was able to awaken him but the Dark fragment corrupts him. Upon donning the Dark fragments he became part of the Four Dark Devas. Would later succeed the Yama no Yoroi from his brother and become Kyosan no Psycho Mark Two.

==== The Four Devas of Fuurinkazan (風林火山四天王, Fuurinkazan Shitennou) ====
Hayate no Nyu (疾風の仁宇)

Nyu of the Seven Mushas. Hayate no Nyu is the form of Nyu after gaining the Kaze no Yoroi (Armour of Wind) which contains the power of Ryuouten(龍王天).

Mitsurin no Mark Two (密林の摩亜屈)

Mark Two of the Seven Mushas. Mitsurin no Mark Two is the form of Mark Two after gaining the Mitsurin no Yoroi (Armour of the Forest) which contains the power of Junouten(隼王天).

Kaen no Double Zeta (火炎の駄舞留精太)

Double Zeta of the Seven Mushas. Kaen no Double Zeta is the form of Double Zeta after gaining the Hi no Yoroi (Armour of Fire) which contains the power of Kaenten(火炎天).

Kyosan no Psycho (巨山の斎胡)

Psycho of the Seven Mushas. Kyosan no Psycho is the form of Psycho after gaining the Yama no Yoroi (Armour of the Mountain) which contains the power of Kouzanten(光山天).

==== Others ====
Nidaime Daishougun (二代目大将軍)

Previous commander of the Gundam Army. Perished in the clash with Yani Koutei 15 years ago. His spirit is scatter as five Light fragments.

Sandaime Daishougun (三代目大将軍)

- Design basis: Gundam

Musha of the Seven Mushas. He succeeded Nidaime Daishougun to become the Sandaime Daishougun. Being raise as the child of the peasant, he understand the heart of the people. He cares for not only his subordinates but also his people. Combines with Neo Phoenix to become Hyper Phoenix. In order to rise to his full potential he needs the five fragments of Nidaime Daishougun's Gundam Crystal. For that purpose Alex gathered the five holders of the Light fragments. The awakened power managed to defeat Yami Koutei again but Alex is sent back in time. Weapons include the Taiyou no Gunbai(Hououken), Great Omega Cannon and his sure-killer Helldive.

Gundam Fuku Shougun/Onmitsu Shougun (頑駄無副将軍/隠密将軍)

- Design basis: Gundam

Noomaru of the Seven Musha who took up the title Fuku Shougun (lit. Vice General). Assists his brother, the current Daishougun, who is unable to utilize his true power. Found Alex after the previous war and raised him. During that he assumes the identity of Ronin, Yagyu Noube. Presently although he doesn't not do spy activities but he commands his Onmitsu Gundam Force to do the information gathering. Uses the sure-killer Gekkou-kiri.

Nidaime Shou Gundam (二代目将頑駄無)

- Design basis: Full-armour Zeta Gundam

Zeta of the Seven Mushas succeeds Shodai Shou Gundam and became the Nidaime Shou Gundam. The strategist of the Gundam Army. Combines with his steed Super Oracion to become Kirinji Gisou.

==== Troops ====
See Musha Shicinin Shuu Hen.

=== Dark Army (闇軍団, Yami Gundan) ===
Waka Zakuto (若殺駆頭)

- Design basis: Zaku Kai

Son of Zakuto. Was originally a kind hearted young warrior but became evil when he received the Machine-gun(魔神銃) which is sent to him but someone. Now leads the Dark Army for his father who is in an asphyxial state. Plans to invade the Gundam country.

Zaku San Karou (殺駆三家老)

The three zaku brothers from Musha Shichinin Shuu Hen. They became servants of Waka Zakuto.

Zakuto/Resurrected Yami Shougun (殺駆頭/復活闇将軍)

- Design basis: Mass Production Zaku II

Previous leader of the Dark Army. Was put in asphyxial state by his son. When the five Dark fragments are gathered he became Yami Shougun again and once again under control of Yami Koutei.

Yami Koutei (闇皇帝) The evil mastermind of the Dark Army who was defeated in the previous work. But was revived in Yami Shougun's shadow when the five Dark fragments gather.

==== The Four Dark Devas (暗黒四天王, Ankoku Shitennou) ====
Musha Jio (武者璽悪)

- Design basis: The O

Head of the Kyonin Clan. Discovered the true identity of Yami Koutei from the ancient relics, has been after Alex since Alex is a baby. He seems to pledge loyalty to Waka Zakuto but actually he has always been eyeing the Dark Army and wants it for his own. That strong ambition revived in Bushin Kirahagane Hen as a zombie general. Wears the Dark fragment on his back, which is Resurrected Yami Shougun's chest armour.

Musha Sazabi (武者漣飛威)

- Design basis: Sazabi

Head of the Doga Clan. Taught Alex fencing when the Dogas are still friendly with the Gundams and so has built good relations with the Gundam Army. But when he heard that Zakuto is dead (actually in axphysical state) and that Waka Zakuto is raising an army, he decided to join the Dark Army out of loyalty. Wears a pair of Dark fragment on his back which are the shoulder armours of the Resurrected Yami Shougun.

Musha Nin Kenbufa (武者忍剣舞風荒)

- Design basis: Kämpfer

Head of the Mushanin Clan. The literary and military arts teacher of Waka Zakuto since young. And so he is the only person who advises Waka Zakuto. Amidst the many hot-blooded warriors in the Dark Army he is one who keeps a calm composure and analyses the situation at hand. A schemer who makes decisions that profit the Dark Army with his precise judgement. Wears a pair of Dark fragment on his arms which the Resurrected Yami Shougun wears on his arms also.

Musha Psycho Mark Two (武者砕虎魔亜屈)

See above. Wears a pair of Dark fragment as shoulder armour and one as chest armour. Yami Shougun equips that as feet and back armour.

==== Troops ====
See Musha Shicinin Shuu Hen.

== Glossary ==
Light and Dark fragments

When Nidaime Daishougun and Yami Koutei clashed in the last battle, Nidaime's Gundam Crystal shattered to five fragments (the Orbs of Light a.k.a. Light fragments) and are scattered. At the same time Yami Koutei is also scattered as five Dark fragments.

The New Five Mushas (新生武者五人衆, Shinsei Musha Gonin Shuu)

The chosen five holders of the Orbs of Light (Light fragments). Each of the five have deep relations with the Seven Mushas.

The Four Devas of Fuurinkazan (風林火山四天王, Fuurinkazan Shitennou)

Nyu, Mark Two, Double Zeta and Psycho of the Seven mushas who had gained the armours of the Tenku Yontenoh. Later succeeded by the New Five Mushas minus Alex and even later succeeded by the Touha Five (from Chou Kidou Daishougun Hen) minus Godmaru (Touha Four Devas).

The Four Dark Devas (暗黒四天王, Ankoku Shitennou)

The four who possess the Dark fragments.
