= SD Gundam =

Japanese media franchise

SD Gundam (Japanese: SDガンダム, Hepburn: Esu Dī Gandamu; short for Superior Defender Gundam or Super Deformed Gundam) is a media franchise that spawned from the Gundam franchise. SD Gundam takes the mecha (and characters) from Gundam and expresses them in a super deformed and anthropomorphic style.

== Overview ==
SD Gundam originated from a contributed illustration of a junior student from Nagoya by the name of Koji Yokoi to the "Model News" magazine that Bandai was issuing in the 1980s. The illustration is of a Gundam but with an unusual proportion where the overall height of the Gundam is equal to twice that of its head. This illustration interested the chief editor and led to Koji Yokoi serializing SD Gundam in 4 frame comics in "Model News".

The super deformed designs were suitable for capsule toys, and so they were first merchandised as small SD Gundam-shaped erasers as part of the Gashapon series SD Gundam World in 1985. Built with a hole so they could be skewered into a pencil, the series was a hit with Japanese schoolchildren, and the concept soon expanded to other forms of merchandising and media, including models, manga, trading cards, anime and video games.

The popularity of SD Gundam was such that between the late '80s and early '90s, sales from the SD Gundam franchise far exceeded the rest of Gundam. And whereas Gundam pioneered the real robot branch of mecha anime, SD Gundam's more comical and exaggerated approach to the genre served to move it away from the ultra-realism that it was shifting towards in the '80s, and inspired a new flood of super-deformed robot shows between the late '80s and early '90s such as Sunrise's Mashin Hero Wataru, Madö King Granzört and Haō Taikei Ryū Knight, as well as video games such as the Super Robot Wars franchise.

Although the SD Gundam franchise initially started out featuring characters and mecha from the mainstream Gundam series, by the 1990s SD Gundam spawned numerous spin-off series, SD Gundam Sengokuden (Musha Gundam) which has a Sengoku setting, SD Gundam Gaiden (Knight Gundam) which has a fantasy medieval setting and SD Command Chronicles which has a modern military style to name a few.

== Animated works ==
Animated works based on SD Gundam are generally adapted from existing toy lines or manga and are animated by Sunrise.

- Mobile Suit SD Gundam (機動戦士SDガンダム, Kidō Senshi SD Gundam) (movies, OVAs & TV series, 1988 to 1993)

A series of animated short and feature-length films released during the height of SD Gundam's popularity in Asia. Initially feature characters and mecha from the Gundam franchise, before spinning off to a regularly appearing set of SD Gundam characters, notably from the Command Gundam, Knight Gundam, and Musha Gundam sub-franchises.

- Doozy Bots (promo short, 1989)

A proposed animated series intended for the North American market, based on SD Gundam designs. The series was scrapped after only the trailer was released.

- SD Gundam Mushaparaku (SD頑駄無 武者パ楽) (promo short, 2001)

A short music video produced by Sunrise D.I.D. (Digital Imaging Department?) that first appeared in Tokyo Hobby Show in 2001/10/13. The video uses cel-shaded versions of SD Gundam Mushamaruden characters. The video is bundled with the limited special color clear version of BB Senshi #178.

- SD Gundam Mushaparaku ~Shin Musha Tanjō~ (SDガンダム 武者パ楽～新武者誕生～) (promo short, 2003)

Debuted in 42nd Shizuoka Hobby show 2003 on 2003/5/17, this video uses SD Gundam Mushamaruden 2 and 3 characters.

- SD Gundam Force (SDガンダムフォース) (TV series, 2004)

A TV series entirely animated in 3DCG and initially targeted at the North American audience. Based on the settings from SD Command Chronicles, Knight Gundam, and Musha Gundam.

- Gundam Evolve../14 (頑駄無 異歩流武../十四」) (promo short, 2004)

Part of the Gundam Evolve series of 3DCG promotional shorts. Featurings Rekka Musha Gundam fighting against evil Zaku bandits.

- SD Gundam Sangokuden Brave Battle Warriors (SDガンダム三国伝 Brave Battle Warriors) (movie & TV series, 2010)

An animated addition to the BB Senshi Sangokuden manga and model series. The series is an adaptation of the Romance of the Three Kingdoms novel with slightly altered plot and names.

- SD Gundam World Sangoku Soketsuden (SDガンダムワールド 三国創傑伝) (webseries, 2019)

A reboot of the BB Senshi Sangokuden concept released for Gundam's 40th anniversary. The series retains the Romance of the Three Kingdoms theme while having new Gundams in the roles of the characters and the addition of a zombie plague.

- SD Gundam World Heroes (SDガンダムワールド ヒーローズ) (webseries, 2021)
  A sequel to Sangoku Soketsuden with additional characters. It incorporates historical and fictional elements from Romance of the Three Kingdoms, RoboCop/SD Command Chronicles, Journey to the West, King Kong, Arsène Lupin, the King Arthur mythos and Robin Hood/Knight Gundam, Sanada Ten Braves, the Golden Age of Piracy, Japan's Sengoku period/Musha Gundam and the reign of Cleopatra VII Philopator.

== Manga works ==
=== Musha Gundam series ===
Musha Gundam (武者 頑駄無, Musha Gandamu) are Gundam units modelled after samurai, ninja, or other forms of feudal Japanese warriors. Musha Gundam first appeared in "Plamo-Kyoshiro"<プラモ狂四郎> (Story by Craft dan and art by Koichi Yamato). In the story, the SD Gundam is an original Gundam created by Kyoshiro (protagonist) for a showdown with Shigeru (antagonist). The original design of the SD form Musha Gundam is credited to Koichi Yamato, and Yasui Hisashi. The story of Musha Gundam, SD Sengokuden, originated from the manga "Seven Gundams" of the "Comic World" series by MARSHI (a.k.a. Susumu Imaishi). The Musha Gundam series is the longest running SD Gundam series, since the series is set in the Warring States period the use of katakana is avoided, and kanji is used heavily.

English Name	Japanese Name	Author	Volumes	Reference(s)
Chou Musha Gundam Bushin Kirahagane	超SD戦国伝 武神輝羅鋼	Masahiro Kanda	2	
Chou Musha Gundam Touba Daishougun		Masahiro Kanda	2	
Musha Banchō Fūunroku	SDガンダム武者番長風雲録	Masato Ichishiki	4	
SD Gundam Force Emaki Musharetsuden Bukabuka Hen	SDガンダムフォース絵巻 武者烈伝 武化舞可編	Masato Ichishiki	3	
SD Gundam Force Emaki Musharetsuden Zero		Susumu Imaishi (MARSHI)	1	
SD Gundam Musha Generation	SDガンダム ムシャジェネレーション	Masahiro Kanda	0	
SD Gundam Mushamaruden	SD頑駄無 武者○伝	Masato Ichishiki	2	
SD Gundam Mushamaruden 2	SD頑駄無 武者○伝	Masato Ichishiki	2	
SD Gundam Mushamaruden 3	SD頑駄無 武者○伝	Masato Ichishiki	3	
SD Gundam Sangokuden Eiyuu Gekitotsu Hen	BB戦士 三国伝	Kentarō Yano	0	
SD Gundam Sangokuden Fuuun Gouketsu Hen	BB戦士 三国伝	Tokita Koichi	2	
SD Musha Gundam Fuunroku		Masahiro Kanda	9	
SD Sengokuden Fuurinkazan Hen	SD戦国伝 風林火山編	Masahiro Kanda	???	
SD Sengokuden Musha Shichinin Shuu Hen	SD戦国伝 武者七人衆編	Masahiro Kanda	???	
SD Sengokuden Tenka Touitsu Hen	SD戦国伝 天下統一編	Masahiro Kanda	???	
Shin Musha Gundam Chou Kidou Daishougun	新SD戦国伝 超機動大将軍	Masahiro Kanda	3	
Shin Musha Gundam Musha Senki Hakari no Hengen Hen	ムシャ戦記 光の変幻編	Masahiro Kanda	2	
Shin Musha Gundam Shichinin no Choushougun		Masahiro Kanda	2	
Shin SD Sengokuden Densetsu no Daishougun Hen	新SD戦国伝 伝説の大将軍編	Masahiro Kanda	???	
Shin SD Sengokuden Tensei Shichinin Shuu		Masahiro Kanda	2	
SD Gundam World Sangoku Sōketsuden: Enkotan		Takuya Yamanaka	2	
SD Gundam World Sangoku Sōketsuden: Sōshōki		Takuya Yamanaka	2	

=== Knight Gundam series ===
Knight Gundam (騎士ガンダム, Naito Gandamu) is part of the SD Gundam franchise, a sub-franchise of the popular Gundam anime. In Knight Gundam, Gundam mecha and characters are reimagined as knights, sorcerers and other fantasy and medieval European character types. Knight Gundam is a series that took elements from Japanese role playing games, such as the Dragon Quest series, into SD Gundam. The knight style SD Gundam designs are devised by Koji Yokoi and soon Knight Gundam became an independent series like Musha Gundam.

The series first started on Carddas trading cards with the story set in the "Saddarc World" (Carddas spelt backwards). Soon after it expanded to Gashapons, plastic models, manga and games. The Gundams in the Knight Gundam series are portrayed as living beings just like in the Musha Gundam series. But later on in the series giant robots known as "Kihei"(機兵) were introduced thus creating a weird picture of a Gundam piloting a Gundam. Also different from Musha Gundam, Knight Gundam has important human characters like Knight Amuro and Princess Frau throughout the whole series.

English Name	Japanese Name	Author	Volumes	Reference(s)
SD Gundam Gaiden Knight Gundam Monogatari		Ryuuichi Hoshino	10	
SD Gundam Gaiden Knight Gundam Monogatari Special		Ryuuichi Hoshino	3	
Knight Gundam Kikoushin Densetsu		Ryuuichi Hoshino	3	
Knight Gundam Maryuu Zero no Kishiden		Ryuuichi Hoshino	2	
Knight Gundam Gold Saga		Ryuuichi Hoshino	3	
Knight Gundam Gaitoushin Senki		Ryuuichi Hoshino	2	
Knight Gundam Seiden		Ryuuichi Hoshino	3	
SD Gundam Eiyuden		Kōichi Tokita	5	

=== Others ===
- SD Gundam Daibokan G Vehicle (serialized in Comic World and Comic Bom Bom Special Edition)
- SD Gundam Fullcolor Gekijou by Azuma Yuki <あずま 勇輝> (9 volumes, ongoing)

this series is based on the SD Gundam Fullcolor Gashapon toy line, which are capsule toys for SD Gundam figures.

== Game works ==
In the past most of the SD Gundam games are turn-based strategy video games and brawling-type games with shooting. However, the recent SD Gundam games started appearing in other genres.

Below is a rough list of game works, a more accurate and complete list is available at the Japanese wiki entry.

- SD Gundam Gachapon Senshi series
- SD Sengokuden series
- SD Gundam Side Story series
- SD Gundam Eiyūden series
- SD Gundam Arcade series
- SD Gundam G Generation series
- SD Gundam Force
- SD Gundam Force: Showdown!
- SD Gundam Dimension War - a turn-based strategy game for the Virtual Boy. It is one of the console's rarest games. Along with Virtual Bowling this game was the last video game officially released for the Virtual Boy in Japan. Dimension War is notable for the video game debut of Mobile Suit Gundam Wing.

Through not treated as a title from the SD Gundam series, the RPG Gundam True Odyssey (MS Saga: A New Dawn in the US) also used super-deformed graphics for the mobile weapons that were found in the game.

The SD Gundam designs were also used throughout the earlier Super Robot Wars games (up through SRW F and F Final, stopping at SRW Alpha for the PS1), as can be seen by the pupils present in the eyes of the various Mobile Suits that appeared. From SRW Alpha and beyond, however, the eyes of Mobile Suits remain blank, though the robots themselves are still super-deformed (just as all mechs represented in typical SRW games are). The only exceptions are in Shin Super Robot Wars and the Scramble Commander series, where all series featured in these games used real-sized designs instead of the traditional SD-sized ones.

A real-sized Musha Gundam has been placed as a hidden, unlockable unit in Dynasty Warriors: Gundam series. Particular SD Gundams that has been converted to normal sizes are confirmed to participate in the Gundam War trading card game.

== Model kits ==
While regular Gundam model lines strive for realism by introducing High Grade, Master Grade, and Perfect Grade models, SD Gundam models are designed for (and sometimes by) the customization crowd. Many SD Gundam models are designed such that variations of the stock models, as seen by SD Gundam comics, can be made by using parts from other SD Gundam kits. Modifying SD models is very popular in Japan, more so than the full-sized counterparts. In addition to made-up robots contributed to SD Gundam comics, Bandai also held monthly contests for custom Gundam (usually Musha-based) models.

The model kit series is called SD Gundam BB Senshi (SDガンダムBB戦士, Esu Dhī Gandamu BB Senshi). The "BB" in the title comes from the fact that, initially, BB Senshi models came with airguns that shot BB gun pellets. Due to product liability and safety regulations, the feature was soon removed. 2007 saw the release of the 300th kit in the series. Forming the bulk of the series are Musha Gundam kits; the Musha kits have standard gimmicks like detachable armour and others, such as combination and compatibility of parts between kits. In recent years the G Generation kits have introduced a new proportion and enhanced poseability.

Scale is often inconsistent, especially in older kits where many characters from the same storyline are out of scale with one another. However, as the line continued these issues have mostly been addressed and sometimes been intentional. Dai-Shogun characters have often seen their final form released as a much larger figure (in some cases, this is included in the storyline by the character growing to giant size to combat an equally large foe).

Another model kit series called Ganzo SD Gundam (元祖SDガンダム), though discontinued in the 1990s, covered all the SD Gundam series but mainly focus on Knight Gundam kits. These kits are made from more durable plastic and are bigger than the BB Senshi kits. They can currently be found at auction sites, usually with high prices.

Century number releases (100, 200, 300, etc.) are often marked as special occasions. 2007 saw the release of the 300th BB Senshi kit in official numbering. However, the previous kit had been BB 295. Bandai retroactively filled in the missing five kits alongside releases of kits with the 300+ numbering. These retroactive kits were of units from Mobile Suit Gundam SEED Destiny, many being recolors of existing kits. Additionally, popular SD Gundam kits have been re-released in waves at around the same time as new kits. These re-releases are broken down by series (Musha, Knight, Command, G-Generation). The popularity of these older kits is such that many have been included in later re-release waves.

A limited subline titled Chi-Bi Senshi (a pun on the mainline's 'BB' and 'chibi', meaning small) consisted of thirteen kits based on Super G-ARMS, Knight Gundam, Gundlaner and Musha. The kits were smaller and less complex than full BB Senshi, built on a five-point skeleton block which allowed for parts swapping between the kits. This gimmick was also utilized with some of the Knight kits to allow them to combine with larger BB Senshi versions of the 'Kihei' mobile weapons they piloted. Additionally, nine of the Chi-Bi Senshi were released in three triple boxsets, depicting them in widely different transparent colours. The Comic World chapters included with these sets referred to these 'Crystal' versions as doppelgangers made from sentient alien crystals who had chosen to copy the real Gundams.

A related line of merchandise has included the designs from SD Gundam works presented as 'real type' versions, lacking the deformed proportions. This concept has seen a resurgence in recent years, with Bandai issuing a Master Grade model kit of Hajime Katoki's Shin Musha Gundam (appearing in Dynasty Warriors: Gundam) and Banpresto releasing toys and mini-statues based on 'real type' versions of Musha and Knight characters.

=== SDX ===
Starting in 2008, the SDX line is a collector aimed series of action figures based on SD Gundam characters. The first figure released, Knight Gundam, was based on a scratch-built model of the character made by Hobby Japan for his appearance in Musha Retsuden Zero. Following this was a release of 'Full Armor Knight Gundam' (depicting the character's upgraded form), with figures of Satan Gundam and Command Gundam announced for later in 2009. Being a collector aimed line, the series focuses on high detail, option parts and updating popular SD Gundam characters who are only otherwise represented by decades old model kits and toys. For example, Knight Gundam was released with a display base, alternate facial expressions and armor pieces produced from metal.

=== SD Ex-Standard ===
This is the most recent model kit series which aims for styled proportions, weapon customization, budget friendliness, and connecting every single SD Gundam Kit, and possibly even make kits from other grades that doesn't have SD versions of it; one example is the Try Burning Gundam, which currently has a HG (High Grade) version of it, and unlike its past counterpart, the Build Burning Gundam has its own BB Senshi counterpart. So far, this kit series has ten sets, which contains (orderly) RX-78-2, Aile Strike Gundam, Gundam Exia, Wing Gundam Zero EW, Gundam Unicorn (Destroy Mode), Strike Freedom Gundam, Astray Red Frame, OO Gundam, Destiny Gundam, Gundam Barbatos (form 4), Try Burning Gundam, Gundam Deathscythe Hell EW, Sinanju, and Gundam Barbatos Lupus. This kit series is really similar to the BB Senshi sets, but this kit series is a lot smaller than the BB sets or any other SD kit series.
