= SD Command Chronicles =

Line of table-based gameplay figurines

V Command Gundam

SD Command Chronicles (SDコマンド戦記, SD Comando Senki) is a branch of the SD Gundam franchise. In this branch the characters are military, with the characters from the Gundam series split into air, land and sea troops and redesigned accordingly. Was released as model kits mostly in the Ganso line.

Similar to other SD Gundam series, Command Chronicles is set on a singular planet and serves as a stand in for a real world nation. Whilst Musha Gundam commonly represents Asia (Japan, China, India, etc.) and Knight Gundam represents Europe, Command represents America. This is highlighted by the fact the characters use random Engrish and are based on the 'trigger happy' depiction of Americans seen within many action films of the 1980s/1990s, such as Rambo. This behaviour is often highlighted to extremes for comedic purposes. In one mini-comic, after a mission to stop a nuclear launch goes wrong the Gundams are shown having to leave their now destroyed country behind and live in outer space.

Together Musha Gundam, Knight Gundam and Command Chronicles later became the fundamental setting of SD Gundam Force.

== Outline ==
The designs started out as SD Gundam original characters but as the characters increase a world is set up for them. Soon after a crossover of the Musha Gundam and Knight Gundam worlds was decided and the SD Command Chronicles world is set up as the distant future of the Musha and Knight worlds (Gunsavior Z from SD Command Chronicles G-ARMS went back to Ark of the "past" and became Gunsaber. Pirate Knight Captain Red SD from Command Chronicles III SUPER G-ARMS together with Buritsh Kingdom's Rei Kishi and Dabat Kingdom's Ginyu Kishi (both from the Knight world) are descendants of the Red Warrior bloodline).

== Series list ==
- SD Command Chronicles G-ARMS (1990, Game Boy)
- SD Command Chronicles II Gundam Force (1991)
- SD Command Chronicles III SUPER G-ARMS (1992)
- Shin Gundam Force GREAT PANCRACION (1993)
- SD Gundam Time Voyage (1993)

== See also ==
- Musha Gundam
- Knight Gundam
- Superior Defender Gundam Force
