= Masato Ichishiki =

Japanese manga artist (born 1971)

- Born: 12 November 1971 (age 54)
- Occupation: Manga artist
- Known for: SD Gundam
- Website: Masato Ichishiki's home page

Masato Ichishiki (一式まさと, Ichishiki Masato; born 12 November 1971) is a Japanese manga artist, who is best known for his work on the SD Gundam series.

== Works ==
- Shageki Boy SHOOT (1998)
- Tomba! The Wild Adventures (1999)
- War War Tanks! (2000)
- Brave Saga 2 (2000)
- SD Gundam Mushamaruden (2001)
- SD Gundam Mushamaruden 2 (2002)
- SD Gundam Mushamaruden 3 (2003)
- SD Gundam Force Emaki Musharetsuden (2004)
- SD Gundam Force: Destructive Daishogun Appears!!Zako? (2004)
- SD Gundam Musha Banchō Fūunroku (2006–2008)
- Fusion Chronicle Gundam Battle Rave (2008)
- Jyuuken Sentai Gekiranger VS Boukenger

== Design ==
- Gundam Evolve 10: refine design of ZZ Gundam
- Gundam Evolve 14: Musha Gundam

== Recurring themes ==
With Ichishiki's SD Gundam works, there are many recurring elements. These include:

- The lead Gundam being a pre-teen with a fiery temper
- The first human to encounter the lead Gundam is a human boy of similar age
- Artificial Gundams, with cog designs in their eyes to signify their robotic nature
