= Shigeo Kiyama =

Japanese actor and voice actor (born 1973)

- 喜山 茂雄
- Born: September 27, 1973 (age 52); Osaka Prefecture, Japan
- Occupations: Actor, voice actor
- Years active: 1997–present
- Agent: Haikyō

Shigeo Kiyama (喜山 茂雄, Kiyama Shigeo; born September 27, 1973 in Osaka) is a Japanese actor and voice actor.

== Filmography ==
=== Television animation ===
- Ristorante Paradiso (2009) – Gian Luigi Orsini (Gigi)
- Mobile Suit Gundam AGE (2011) – Dian Fonroid, Zafar Rogue and others
- Tiger & Bunny (2011) – Walter
- Battle Spirits: Saikyou Ginga Ultimate Zero (2014) – Hansoro
- One Piece (2019) - Toyama Tsujigiro
- Let's Go Karaoke! (2025) - Pinky Finger

=== Original video animation ===
- Mobile Suit Gundam: The Origin (2015) – Ramba Ral

=== Theatrical animation ===
- Broken Blade (2011) – Kurozawa

=== Tokusatsu ===
- Jyuken Sentai Gekiranger (2007) – Mythical Beast Cetus-Fist Gouyu (ep. 37, 45)
- Fire Leon (2013) – Other Bio Wrestler (eps. 1 - 11, 13 - 16, 21 - 22)

=== Video games ===
- Fire Emblem Fates (2015) – Benoît
- Dragon Quest Heroes II (2016)
- Soulcalibur V (2012) – Maxi
- Soulcalibur VI (2018) – Maxi

=== Television dramas ===
- Liar Game (2009) – Solario (voice)

=== Dubbing ===
==== Live-action ====
- The Avengers – Thomas Roberts
- Dollhouse – Paul Ballard (Tahmoh Penikett)
- Don't Look Up – Dr. Teddy Oglethorpe (Rob Morgan)
- Gulliver's Travels – Lilliputian Royal Guard (Harry Peacock)
- The Mentalist – Agent Kimball Cho (Tim Kang)
- Running Wild with Bear Grylls – Zachary Quinto
- Star Trek – Spock (Zachary Quinto)
- Star Trek Into Darkness – Spock (Zachary Quinto)
- Star Trek Beyond – Spock (Zachary Quinto)
- The Tudors – William Compton (Kris Holden-Ried)

==== Animation ====
- Love, Death & Robots – Coulthard
