= Kentarō Yano =

Japanese manga artist

- Born: October 3, 1957 (age 69) Japan
- Area: Manga artist

Kentarō Yano (矢野 健太郎, Yano Kentarō; born October 3, 1957) is a Japanese manga artist. He attended Osaka University of Arts, majoring in design in the college of fine arts. In February 1981, Yano made his debut with Kyōka Senshi Armpit, which won the 2nd Seinen Manga Contest.

== Works ==
- Akirecha Dame Desu
- ArbeZ
- Bust Shot
- Celluloid Night
- Chotto Kakushita
- Cottonplay
- Dreamer
- Free Radical
- From-C
- Hinako Variation
- Homage
- Hunter Killer Mina
- Injukāshisu
- Jashin Densetsu series
  - Confusion
  - Dark Mermaid
  - Lamia
  - Last Creator
  - Re-Birth
- Love Simulation
- Masami no Kimochi
- Mo Ichido Once More
- Neko Janai mon!
- Network Warrior
- Onigarijū
- P·U·L·S·E
- Prefab Rhapsody
- Program Alice
- SD Gundam Sangokuden Eiyuu Gekitotsu Hen
- Sweet Time
