= BB Senshi Sangokuden =

Japanese media franchise

BB Senshi Sangokuden (BB戦士 三国伝, BB Warrior Romance Of The Three Kingdoms) is a series in the SD Gundam franchise from 2007 and the 18th work in the Musha Gundam series. The story and characters are modeled after those featured in the classic 14th-century Chinese novel, Romance of the Three Kingdoms by Luo Guanzhong, though story elements and the names of the Three Kingdoms themselves are fictionalized.

There are three chapters under this title, entitled Fuuun Gouketsu Hen, Eiyuu Gekitotsu Hen and Senjin Kettou Hen. It also has a side story, Sangokuden Gaiden Buyuu Gekitou Roku.

The series was announced to be released in a number of territories, including Japan, Korea, America and Australia. However, as of 2009 only releases in Asian regions have followed.

== Manga ==
Kōichi Tokita drew the first chapter of the manga titled SD Gundam Sangokuden Fuuun Gouketsu Hen (SDガンダム三国伝 風雲豪傑編, SD Gundam Romance Of The Three Kingdoms: Gathering of the Heroes Chapter) which was serialized in volumes 7 to 12 of Comic Bom Bom in 2007. Kentarō Yano continues with the second chapter of the series titled SD Gundam Sangokuden Eiyuu Gekitotsu Hen (SDガンダム三国伝 英雄激突編, SD Gundam Romance Of The Three Kingdoms: Clash of the Heroes Chapter) which will serialize in Kerokero Ace from volume 2 of 2008 to volume 4 of 2009.

The third chapter, SD Gundam Sangokuden Senjin Kettou Hen (SDガンダム三国伝 戦神決闘編, SD Gundam Romance Of The Three Kingdoms: Battle of the War Gods Chapter), starts from Kerokero Ace volume 5 of 2009 and will be drawn by Naoto Tsushima. With the unknown fate of Ryuubi (Liu Bei) Gundam, the lead character of the third chapter is announced to be Bachou Blue Destiny.

== Anime ==
An anime adaptation for Sangokuden was announced on October 8, 2009, during the 49th All Japan Plamodel Hobby Show. Kadokawa Pictures confirmed at a Tokyo press conference on December 9, 2009, that the anime adaptation would first arrive as a theatrical film. Chō Denei-ban SD Gundam Sangokuden Brave Battle Warriors opened in Japan on February 27, 2010, in a double billing with the fifth Sgt. Frog (Keroro Gunsō) film, Chō Gekijō-ban Keroro Gunsō Tanjō! Kyūkyoku Keroro Kiseki no Jikūjima de Arimasu!!. Sunrise produced both films.

Besides the movie, a 51-episode TV animated series was produced starting April 3, 2010. Each episode is estimated to air for 15 minutes.

== Games ==
A series of mobile phone games are made by Taiwanese company Joymaster in collaboration with Bandai-Namco:

- BB戦士三国伝 無雙爭霸 – a time attack game
- BB戦士三国伝 武鬥會 – a fighting game
- BB戦士三国伝 一統方城 – a mahjong game
- BB戦士三国伝 無雙連鎖 – a Bejeweled style game
- BB戦士三国伝 達人學堂
- BB戦士三国伝 激鬥旋風
- BB戦士三国伝 BIG2風雲會
- BB戦士三国伝 激鬥旋風

Besides the above games, Bandai-Namco announced SDガンダム三国伝 Brave Battle Warriors 真三璃紗大戦 (SD Gundam Sangokuden Brave Battle Warriors Shin Mirisha Taisen), slated for release on 2 December 2010 for the Nintendo DS handheld. A special promotion of the game came with a limited edition DX boxset of Shin Kouseki Turn-X (項羽ターンX) VS Ryuuhou Ryuubi Gundam (劉邦劉備ガンダム, whose character basis is Liu Bang).
