= Carddass =

Japanese card vending machine and its cards

Carddass (カードダス, Kādodasu) is a name given to Bandai's card vending machines and, thus, a generic term given to the cards sold by these machines. The name was inspired by AMeDAS (Automated Meteorological Data Acquisition System), a system in Japan used for gathering weather data; the idea was that Carddass would be an information source for kids. Carddass is a registered trademark of Bandai.

As of March 2021, Bandai Namco has sold 17.767 billion Carddass cards since 1988, in addition to 2.749 billion Data Carddass cards since March 2005.

== History ==
The first Carddass, released in 1988, is based on the Saint Seiya anime series. In the past, Carddass was for trading and collection only. But since trading card games like Pokémon and Yu-Gi-Oh became popular in Japan, more and more Carddass is made in the form of trading cards that can be played in a game.

Apart from Saint Seiya, much popular anime, manga and tokusatsu series has been made into Carddass, the most famous ones being Bleach, Toriko, Hunter x Hunter, Digimon, Dr. Slump, Dragon Ball, Kinnikuman, Gin Tama, Black Butler, Code Geass, Soul Eater, Fullmetal Alchemist, Gundam, Kamen Rider, Naruto, Neon Genesis Evangelion, One Piece, Revolutionary Girl Utena, YuYu Hakusho, Ranma ½, Sailor Moon, InuYasha, Slam Dunk, Konjiki no Gash Bell!!, Rurouni Kenshin, Ultraman, and Yu-Gi-Oh! (the Carddass game is based on Toei's anime and is not to be confused with Konami's card game).

In 2006, a Super Sentai-based trading card game, Rangers Strike, was released in commemoration of the Super Sentai Series' 30th Anniversary.

In 2007, Carddass started to sell Top Trumps in Japan.

A digital version of the game, Data Carddass, was introduced in 2005. This series revolves around arcade machines that can read specially designed cards to access in-game content, such as weapons, characters or clothes. Also, recently introduced are AR Carddass, which utilises augmented reality features in smartphones, and Net Carddass which utilises online functionality.

Bandai had sold over 11.5 billion Carddass cards by 2017, including 2 billion Dragon Ball cards by 1998, and 500 million Konjiki no Gash Bell cards by 2005.
