= See for Me =

2021 Canadian thriller film

- Promotional release poster
- Directed by: Randall Okita
- Written by: Adam Yorke; Tommy Gushue
- Produced by: Matt Code; Kristy Neville
- Starring: Skyler Davenport; Jessica Parker Kennedy; Laura Vandervoort; Matthew Gouveia; Emily Piggford; Joe Pingue; Kim Coates
- Cinematography: Jordan Oram; Jackson Parrell
- Edited by: James Vandewater
- Music by: Joseph Murray; Lodewijk Vos
- Production companies: Wildling Pictures; Di Brina Film
- Distributed by: levelFilm
- Release dates: June 10, 2021 (Tribeca); January 7, 2022 (Canada)
- Running time: 92 minutes
- Country: Canada
- Language: English
- Box office: $725,952 (worldwide)

See for Me is a 2021 Canadian thriller film directed by Randall Okita. It stars Skyler Davenport as Sophie, a visually impaired teenager who is housesitting for a wealthy client when three criminals break into the house to rob it; Sophie's only defense is a smartphone app called See for Me which connects her to Kelly (Jessica Parker Kennedy), a gamer who has to use the app to see Sophie's surroundings and guide her actions. Laura Vandervoort, Matthew Gouveia, Emily Piggford, Joe Pingue and Kim Coates also star.

The film was shot in 2020, with production temporarily interrupted by the COVID-19 pandemic in Canada. It was screened for distributors at the 2020 American Film Market, before having its public premiere at the 2021 Tribeca Film Festival.

== Plot ==
Downhill skier Sophie Scott has her Olympic dreams dashed when she is diagnosed with retinitis pigmentosa, a degenerative eye disease causing blindness. Although her friend Cam offers to help her train for the Paralympics by working as her seeing guide, she refuses and gives up on her skiing dreams. To make money, she cat sits for wealthy homeowners and steals expensive wine from them to resell, with help from Cam. Sophie answers an ad for a cat sitter placed by Debra, a rich woman in upstate New York leaving for a vacation after just divorcing her husband. After locking herself outside of the house, Sophie uses See For Me, a phone app that allows blind people to connect with sighted volunteers via video call. She is connected to Kelly, a gamer in Florida who helps her get back inside.

That night, Sophie is awoken by three men breaking into the house. She calls 911 and reports the break-in, but the 911 operator tells her it will be a long response time due to the house's remote location. She hangs up and uses See For Me to contact Kelly again, but is caught by the men, who disconnect the video call. Kelly, desperate to help Sophie, contacts the police to have them cross reference 911 calls in an attempt to locate the house that Sophie is in. Sophie learns that the men have broken into the house to steal $7 million hidden in a safe in the wall. After checking Sophie's phone and seeing that she called 911, the men contemplate giving up the score and killing her. They call their boss, Rico, who tells them to let Sophie live as she has not seen anyone. Rico also instructs them to pack up their gear and come back later. Sophie convinces them to give her a share of the take in exchange for sending the police away. Sophie calls 911 a second time to cancel her initial report, but is told that the police have to respond even after a false alarm is reported.

When the deputy arrives to investigate, Sophie lies and says there was no emergency. As the deputy is about to leave, Kelly's alert is radioed out and Sophie's lie is revealed. The deputy calls for backup and attempts to arrest the intruders but is killed by one of the men. Sophie escapes with the deputy's gun and calls Kelly for help. Kelly helps her shoot two of the men, while the third man finishes breaking into the safe. Kelly guides Sophie to the final robber, who opens the safe to take the money. Before Sophie can shoot him, her phone dies and her call with Kelly ends. Although the thief tells Sophie that he is about to leave, she shoots him when he reaches for the dead police officer's taser. She waits for the police to arrive, but is surprised by the appearance of Rico. Rico reveals that he is Debra's ex-husband and he hired all three of the robbers to break into the safe to steal his money back from his wife. He tells her that Debra did not know the safe or the money was in the house, and tries to convince her to let him take the money. Sophie refuses and cuts off the lights in the house, baiting Rico to pursue her. After running out of ammunition in her gun, she is caught by Rico and almost dies as he strangles her but gains the upper hand and bludgeons him to death.

After recovering in the hospital, Sophie tells her mom that she has decided to try out for the Paralympics and plans to ski again. Her mom tells her that they will need money to buy all new gear, and Sophie clutches her backpack and smiles. Shortly after, Sophie video calls Kelly to give her an update on her skiing progress, while Cam acts as Sophie's guide.

== Cast ==
- Skyler Davenport as Sophie Scott
- Jessica Parker Kennedy as Kelly
- Pascal Langdale as Ernie
- George Tchortov as Otis
- Joe Pingue as Dave
- Kim Coates as Rico
- Keaton Kaplan as Cam
- Laura Vandervoort as Debra
- Emily Piggford as Deputy Brooks
- Matthew Gouveia as Cabbie

== Production ==
The filmmakers sought to cast a blind or visually impaired actor in the role of Sophie, resulting in the casting process taking several years. Davenport is visually impaired in real life. Filming took place in Canada.

== Reception ==
=== Box office ===
The film grossed $51,218 domestically and $674,734 internationally, for a total gross of $725,952 worldwide.

=== Critical reception ===
On the review aggregator website Rotten Tomatoes, 80% of 81 critics' reviews are positive, with an average rating of 6.5/10. The website's consensus reads: "A home invasion thriller with a nifty twist, See for Me is further elevated by Skyler Davenport's magnetic lead performance." Metacritic, which uses a weighted average, assigned the film a score of 59 out of 100, based on 14 critics, indicating "mixed or average" reviews.

Jude Dry of IndieWire gave the film a grade of B+, calling it "a tightly-wound thriller propelled by enough turns that you won't want to miss a beat", and said that Davenport "anchors the action with their instinctual performance, playing Sophie with a pointed ferocity that is clearly masking deep pain." Michael Nordine of Variety magazine wrote, "though 'See for Me' isn't as insightful as it is thrilling, you'll likely be too immersed in the drama to notice. It's as though Okita, Yorke and Gushue made a list of every mistake similar films have made in the past and set to eschew all of them." Noel Murray of the Los Angeles Times wrote, "Aside from the quirky and exciting gaming angle, 'See for Me' is a pretty straightforward suspense film - but a well-crafted one."

Ignatiy Vishnevetsky of The A.V. Club gave the film a grade of C+, writing, "Before long, anyone who's seen far too many thrillers will begin composing a mental list of missed opportunities... See For Me could be the home-invasion movie with the blind cat-sitter and the ski chase scene. Instead, it's the home-invasion movie with the blind cat-sitter and the app." Jeanette Catsoulis of The New York Times wrote, "while [the film] offers the novelty of a disabled character who is rather less than morally upstanding, this uninvolving thriller is as lacking in tension as credibility." Adam Graham of The Detroit News gave the film a grade of C−, writing: "Director Randall Okita has a good premise to work with but the story takes several wrong turns, and See For Me is filled with holes in logic that take away from its credibility, and more importantly its believability."
