= Ayaka: A Story of Bonds and Wounds =

Japanese anime television series

- Key visual

あやか (Ayaka)
- Genre: Fantasy
- Created by: GoRA; King Records
- Anime television series
- Directed by: Nobuyoshi Nagayama
- Produced by: Fumihiro Ozawa; Akihiro Sotokawa; Nobuhiko Kurosu
- Written by: Rei Rairaku
- Music by: Kana Shibue
- Studio: Studio Blanc
- Licensed by: Crunchyroll; SA/SEA: Medialink
- Original network: Tokyo MX, BS11
- Original run: July 2, 2023 – September 17, 2023
- Episodes: 12
- Manga

Ayaka: Muzzle Flash Back
- Written by: GoRA
- Illustrated by: Ryo Kuroda
- Published by: Ichijinsha
- Magazine: Monthly Comic Zero Sum
- Original run: July 28, 2023 – present

Ayaka: A Story of Bonds and Wounds (あやか, Ayaka) is an original Japanese anime television series created and written by GoRA, animated by Studio Blanc and produced by King Records. It is directed by Nobuyoshi Nagayama, with Kana Shibue composing the music and Ryō Tanaka directing the sound at Bit Grooove Promotion. Original character designs are provided by Redjuice, while Misaki Kaneko adapts those designs for animation. It aired from July 2 to September 17, 2023, on Tokyo MX and BS11. The opening theme song, "AYAKASHI", is performed by Angela, while the ending theme song, "Flashback", is performed by saji. Crunchyroll streamed the series. Medialink licensed the series in Asia-Pacific. A spin-off manga written by GoRA and illustrated by Ryo Kuroda, titled Ayaka: Muzzle Flash Back, began serialization in Ichijinsha's Monthly Comic Zero Sum magazine on July 28, 2023.

== Summary ==
Yukito Yanagi is an orphan from Ayakajima, which is a region made up of seven islands where mysterious beings called "Mitama" and dragons are rumored to reside. Upon his father's death when he was five years old, he was sent to be raised in Tokyo. Now, upon graduating from middle school, Yukito encounters an eccentric disciple of his father who turns out to be his childhood friend, Jingi Sagawa, who brings him back to Ayakajima. There, Yukito meets his father's two other disciples, who protect the harmony of Ayakajima which is threatened by rogue mitama and spirits.

== Characters ==
Yukito Yanagi (八凪幸人, Yanagi Yukito)
Voiced by: Yūto Uemura (Japanese); Dallas Reid (English)
Yukito is the orphan son of Ley Master Makoto Yanagi. His mother is unknown. He was born in Ayaka and moved to mainland Japan after his father's death when he was about 5 years old. Ten years later, he is brought back to Ayaka by Jingi.
Jingi Sagawa (沙川尽義, Sagawa Jingi)
Voiced by: Takuma Terashima (Japanese); Landon McDonald (English)
Jingi is a Ley Master who studied under Makoto Yanagi. He serves as a mentor and older brother to Yukito, teaching him to become a Ley Master. Yukito has mixed feelings towards him given Jingi's immaturity and propensity to drink alcohol excessively.
Haruaki Kurama (鞍馬春秋, Kurama Haruaki)
Voiced by: Kohsuke Toriumi (Japanese); Oscar Seung (English)
Haruaki Kurama was previously the senior disciple of Makoto Yanagi and currently serves as the head priest of the Kasen Shrine. He serves as a mentor to Yako Amano and Chatarō Fukawake. Previously a good friend of his fellow disciple Aka Ibuki during their time in training, Kurama does not like to interact with Ibuki because he considers his former peer's methods of quelling Ara-mitama to be heretical.
Aka Ibuki (伊吹朱, Ibuki Aka)
Voiced by: Yūichirō Umehara (Japanese); Alex Hom (English)
Aka Ibuki is a Ley Master and the director of Ayaka Security, an organization entrusted to keep Ayaka safe from Ara-mitama. He was once a disciple under Makoto Yanagi and good friends with Haruaki Kurama. After Makoto Yanagi's death, the two parted ways because of their differing philosophies about spirits.
Chatarō Fukuwake (福分茶太郎, Fukuwake Chatarō)
Voiced by: Gakuto Kajiwara (Japanese); Corey Wilder (English)
Chatarō is a disciple under Haruaki Kurama. He is around the same age as Yukito. While friends with Yako, the two rival about who is Kurama's top disciple.
Yako Amano (天乃夜胡, Amano Yako)
Voiced by: Yuki Sakakihara (Japanese); Ciarán Strange (English)
Yako is a disciple under Haruaki Kurama. He is around the same age as Yukito. He is friends with fellow disciple Chatarou, though there is also a rivalry between the two.
Ibara Ichijō (一条いばら, Ichijō Ibara)
Voiced by: Kana Hanazawa (Japanese); Hayden Daviau (English)
Ibara is a member of Ayaka Security working under Aka Ibuki. Her parents are deceased and she looks to Ibuki as an older brother, calling him "boss". She is around the same age as Yukito.
Makoto Yanagi (八凪真人, Yanagi Makoto)
Voiced by: Kenjiro Tsuda (Japanese); Marcus D. Stimac (English)
Ten years prior to the start of the main storyline, Makoto Yanagi, often known as Sensei Yanagi, was the premier Ley Master helping to protect Ayaka. He was the father of Yukito. He is believed to have died fighting the dragon spirit that provoked a volcanic eruption on one of the islands. Many people in Ayaka consider him a savior.
Taihei Makita (薪田太平, Makita Taihei)
Voiced by: Jun Fukuyama
Taihei Makita is a member of Ayaka Security, working under Aka Ibuki. He is also the manager of the diner that is located in the same building as Ayaka Security.
Momoko Amamiya (尼宮百々子, Amamiya Momoko)
Voiced by: Saori Hayami (Japanese); Brianna Roberts (English)
Momoko Amamiya is the landlady of Yukito's childhood home. She acts as a mother figure to Yukito, including cooking his favorite dish, curry.
Sanji Inо̄ (稲生三次, Inō Sanji)
Voiced by: Nobuo Tobita (Japanese); Kent Williams (English)
Sanji Inо̄ is Yukito's guardian and mayor of Ayakashima city. He is the person who carried out Yanagi's will by sending Yukito to the mainland to grow up and returning him to Ayaka after graduating from middle school.
Mitama (ミタマ)
Voiced by: Hekiru Shiina

== Episode list ==
No.	Title	Original release date
1	"Why Don't You Go for a Ride?" (Japanese: お前ちょっと飛んでみろ)	July 2, 2023
Freshly graduated from middle school, loner Yanagi Yukito finds himself spirited away to his childhood home on the Ayaka Islands. There, he discovers that he is descended from a line of magic users known as Ley Masters.
2	"I Definitely Drank Too Much" (Japanese: さすがに飲み過ぎた)	July 9, 2023
Jingi takes Yukito on his first job to pacify an Ara-Mitama chasing people away from the local canal, but the origin of the problem may be closer to home than either of them believed.
3	"Those Two Have a Lot of Issues" (Japanese: 色々あんだよ。あの二人には)	July 16, 2023
Yukito and Jingi visit the First Island, a popular tourist destination. There, they meet Ibuki, another former disciple of Yukito's father, but one who has a very different view on how to handle Ara-Mitama.
4	"You Can Do It" (Japanese: おまえなら出来るはずさ)	July 23, 2023
While visiting Kasen Shrine, Yukito is surprised by an offer of friendship from Kurama's disciples Yako and Chataro. But when they put his Ley Mastery to the test, he finds his fear of losing control of his powers again may not be unfounded.
5	"Then Give Me Drinking Money" (Japanese: じゃ、お酒のお金ちょうだい)	July 30, 2023
Yukito learns a bit more about his father's legacy and the lasting impression he's left behind on the people of the Ayaka Islands. During a visit to his grave, he runs into Ibara, Aka's stonefaced associate.
6	"My Master Would've Given Us an Earful" (Japanese: 師匠がいたら大目玉だな)	August 6, 2023
Yukito tries to fend off the Ara-Mitama with Ibara, Chataro, and Yuko. When Aka and Haruaki arrive to help, things get heated as their ideals clash and emotions run high.
7	"Forget the Past" (Japanese: 昔話とかいいからさ)	August 12, 2023
A glimpse into the halcyon past when Aka, Haruaki, and Jingi were Makoto's young disciples, and how Makoto stepped up to save the Ayaka Islands one fateful night when disaster struck.
8	"You've Come to Wear Some Better Expressions" (Japanese: いい顔するようになったじゃねえか)	August 19, 2023
Yukito attends a summer festival with all his new friends as he tries to enjoy some semblance of a normal life for a boy his age, but the evening's peace rests on shaky ground.
9	"This Is No Laughing Matter" (Japanese: 笑いごとじゃねえや)	August 26, 2023
The Ayaka Islands prepare for an evacuation after the eruption on the Fourth Island. As everyone makes their own preparations to try and help save the islands, Yukito discovers the truth about his identity.
10	"I'll Go With You" (Japanese: 一緒に行ってやるからさ)	September 2, 2023
As the fire dragon rampages and threatens the future of the Ayaka Islands, Jingi steels his resolve and prepares to follow through on a promise he made years ago.
11	"Yukito, Jump!" (Japanese: 幸人、飛んでみろ！)	September 9, 2023
The Ayaka Islands are safe again thanks to Jingi, but his choice causes ripples of emotions through the island's inhabitants and strife among the Ley Masters. In his despair, Yukito sees a light in the darkness, and makes a decision of his own.
12	"Don't say such embarrassing things" (Japanese: 恥ずかしいこと言ってんじゃねーよ)	September 16, 2023
Yukito takes a leap of faith and dives into the Ley Energy, and encounters a certain soul while searching for Jingi. On the outside, the other Ley Masters band together to help lead him home.

== See also ==
- K — Another anime television series created by GoRA.
