= Cheer Boys!! =

Japanese novel and its adaptations

チア男子!! (Chia Danshi!!)
- Genre: Sports (Cheerleading)
- Novel
- Written by: Ryō Asai
- Published by: Shueisha
- Published: October 5, 2010
- Manga

Cheer Danshi!!
- Written by: Ryō Asai
- Illustrated by: Ayaka Matsumoto
- Published by: Shueisha
- Magazine: Cookie
- Original run: June 25, 2011 – March 26, 2013
- Volumes: 4
- Manga

Cheer Danshi!! GO BREAKERS
- Written by: Ryō Asai
- Illustrated by: Ken'ichi Kondō
- Published by: Shueisha
- Magazine: Shōnen Jump+
- Original run: April 5, 2016 – November 8, 2016
- Volumes: 2
- Anime television series
- Directed by: Ai Yoshimura
- Written by: Reiko Yoshida
- Music by: TAKAROT
- Studio: Brain's Base
- Licensed by: AUS: Madman Entertainment; NA: Funimation
- Original network: KBS Kyoto, Sun TV, Tokyo MX
- Original run: July 5, 2016 – September 27, 2016
- Episodes: 12 + 2 OVA

Cheer Boys!! (Japanese: チア男子!!, Hepburn: Chia Danshi!!) is a Japanese novel written by Ryō Asai, first published on October 5, 2010, by Shueisha. It follows the members of a university's all-male cheerleading squad. The novel is loosely based on the real-life men's cheerleading team "Shockers" from Waseda University. The series was also adapted as a manga by Kenichi Kondō for the Shōnen Jump+ app starting on April 5, 2016. An anime adaptation started airing on July 5, 2016. It is directed by Ai Yoshimura and written by Reiko Yoshida for the studio Brain's Base. A live action film directed by Hiroki Kazama was released on May 10, 2019.

== Plot ==
Disheartened with judo, college student Haruki "Haru" Bando was invited by his childhood friend Kazuma Hashimoto to create "BREAKERS", a boys' cheerleading team. Those that joined included the argumentative Mizoguchi, the voracious Ton, the frivolous Kansai boys Gen and Ichiro, and Sho, who has cheerleading experience.

== Characters ==
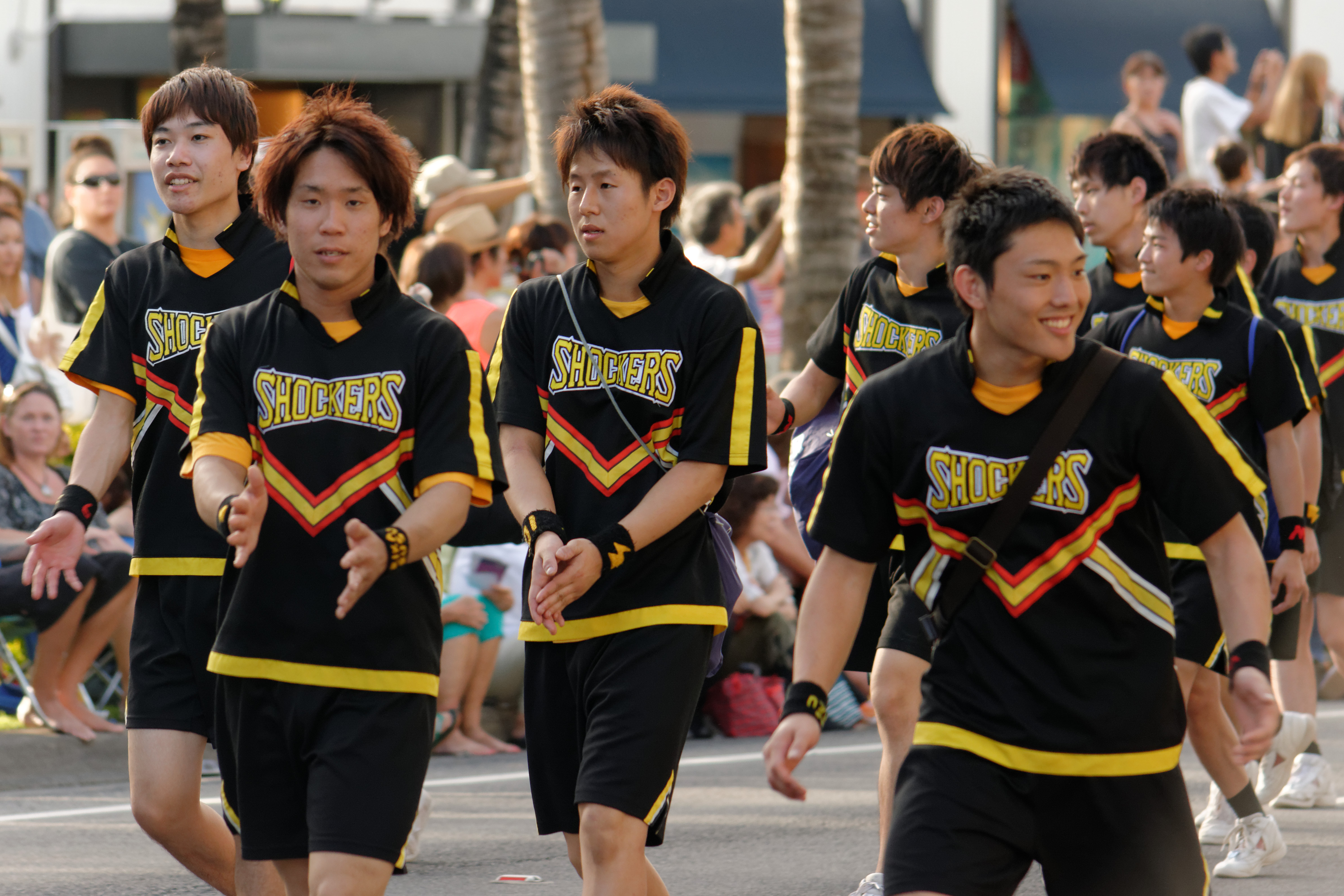
Members of the all-male cheerleading squad "Shockers". The series is based on them.

Haruki Bandō (坂東晴希, Bandō Haruki)
Voiced by: Yūki Yonai (Japanese); Dallas Reid (English)
Haruki is the protagonist. He was previously a part of the judo club before he was convinced to join the cheerleading team, Breakers, by his childhood friend, Kazuma.
Kazuma Hashimoto (橋本一馬, Hashimoto Kazuma)
Voiced by: Nobuhiko Okamoto (Japanese); Justin Pate (English)
Haruki's childhood friend.
Shō Tokugawa (徳川翔, Tokugawa Shō)
Voiced by: Yūki Ono (Japanese); Kyle Phillips (English)
Wataru Mizoguchi (溝口渉, Mizoguchi Wataru)
Voiced by: Tomokazu Sugita (Japanese); Jarrod Greene (English)
Kōji Tōno (遠野浩司, Tōno Kōji)
Voiced by: Yū Hayashi (Japanese); Cris George (English)
Sōichirō Suzuki (鈴木総一郎, Suzuki Sōichirō)
Voiced by: Kōsuke Kuwano (Japanese); Alejandro Saab (English)
Gen Hasegawa (長谷川弦, Hasegawa Gen)
Voiced by: Katsuyuki Konishi (Japanese); Clifford Chapin (English)
Hisashi Mori (森久志, Mori Hisashi)
Voiced by: Tasuku Hatanaka (Japanese); Seth Magill (English)
Ryūzō Sakuma (佐久間 龍造, Sakuma Ryūzō)
Voiced by: Ayumu Murase (Japanese); Justin Briner (English)
Takeru Andō (安藤 タケル, Andō Takeru)
Voiced by: Chiharu Sawashiro (Japanese); Jessie James Grelle (English)
Tamotsu Kaneda (金田 保, Kaneda Tamotsu)
Voiced by: Anri Katsu (Japanese); Marcus D. Stimac (English)
Natsuki Someya (染谷 夏生, Someya Natsuki)
Voiced by: Hayato Kimura (Japanese); Ricco Fajardo (English)
Daichi Norita (乗田 大地, Norita Daichi)
Voiced by: Yūya Hirose (Japanese); Ethan Gallardo (English)
Takuya Nabeshima (鍋島 卓哉, Nabeshima Takuya)
Voiced by: Ryūichi Kijima (Japanese); Jacob Browning (English)
Takumi Nabeshima (鍋島 卓巳, Nabeshima Takumi)
Voiced by: Takefumi Yumihara (Japanese); Austin Tindle (English)
Chen Zixian (チン・ズーシェン, Chin Zūshuen)
Voiced by: Yosei Bun (Japanese); Daman Mills (English)
Jin Dōmoto (堂本 仁, Dōmoto Jin)
Voiced by: Hiroki Yasumoto (Japanese); Ian Sinclair (English)
Kaoru Hanasaki (花咲 薫, Hanasaki Kaoru)
Voiced by: Yoshitaka Yamaya (Japanese); Kyle Igneczi (English)
Satsuki Takagi (高城 さつき, Takagi Satsuki)
Voiced by: Yuko Kaida (Japanese); Morgan Garrett (English)
Haruko Bandō (坂東 晴子, Bandō Haruko)
Voiced by: Ayumi Fujimura (Japanese); Skyler Davenport (English)
Chihiro Sakai (酒井 千裕, Sakai Chihiro)
Voiced by: Reika Uyama (Japanese); Amber Lee Connors (English)

== Anime ==
A 13-episode anime television series produced by Brain's Base aired from July 5, 2016, to September 27, 2016, on KBS Kyoto, Sun TV, and Tokyo MX. The anime is directed by Ai Yoshimura and written by Reiko Yoshida. The opening theme song is "Hajime no Ippo" (初めの一歩|lit Fighting Spirit) by Luck Life and the ending song is "LIMIT BREAKERS" by BREAKERS.

=== Episode list ===
No.	Title	Original release date
1	"The Curtain Rises"; Transliteration: "Maku ga Agaru" (Japanese: 幕が上がる)	July 5, 2016
College freshman Haruki Bandou has practiced judo his whole life, but an injury and severe lack of self-confidence finally push him to give it up. His childhood friend Kazuma Hashimoto insists they start something new together: a men's cheerleading club.
2	"Your First Cheerleader Smile"; Transliteration: "Hajimari no Chia Sumairu" (Japanese: 始まりのチアスマイル)	July 12, 2016
The newly-formed Men's Cheerleading Club meets up with a stocky recruit and attempts to pull away two promising candidates from the Tennis Club.
3	"The Seventh Squirrelurai"; Transliteration: "Shichi Ninme no Risu Jirou" (Japanese: 七人目のリスジロー)	July 19, 2016
The Men's Cheerleading Club needs one more member to make their debut, and they appear to have found the perfect candidate. There's just one problem...
4	"What We Want To Break"; Transliteration: "Kowashitai Mono" (Japanese: 壊したいもの)	July 26, 2016
Having reached their goal of seven members, the squad begins practicing stunts for the first time, and even meets the Meishiin Women's Cheerleading Team, but things don't go as well as they hoped.
5	"Let's Go, Breakers!"; Transliteration: "Let's Go, Breakers!" (Japanese: LET'S GO BREAKERS!)	August 2, 2016
As summer vacation begins, the Breakers start preparing for their debut, and must deal with Haruki's fear, an unexpected injury, and their overall lack of experience in the process.
5.5	"The View We Seven Shared"; Transliteration: "Nananin de Mita Keshiki" (Japanese: 七人で見た景色)	August 9, 2016
Haruki and Kazuma recap the first five episodes and review some cheerleading
6	"Restart"; Transliteration: "Restart" (Japanese: RE.START)	August 16, 2016
After a successful debut, the Breakers have their hands full with training new recruits and dealing with their conflicting personalities. Meanwhile, their self-appointed coach pressures Sho to confront his painful past.
7	"Strain"; Transliteration: "Yugami" (Japanese: 歪み)	August 23, 2016
Tempers run high as the newly recruited, no-nonsense Hisashi clashes with his teammates over their lack of skills and commitment.
8	"The Dawning of a Bond"; Transliteration: "Kizuna no Goraikō" (Japanese: 絆のご来光)	August 30, 2016
As the Breakers struggle to perfect their routine for the qualifiers, they debate whether to add even more difficult stunts, and Hisashi threatens to quit the team altogether.
9	"Tears of the Sun"; Transliteration: "Taiyō no Namida" (Japanese: 太陽の涙)	September 6, 2016
Kazuma suddenly stops coming to practice, and his teammates speculate wildly about the reason for his absence.
10	"What I Wanted To Tell You"; Transliteration: "Kimi ni Tsutaetakatta Koto" (Japanese: 君に伝えたかったこと)	September 13, 2016
The Breakers head to the qualifiers, but Haruki seems distracted by his sister's troubles, while Sho struggles to deal with criticism from an old teammate.
11	"Bittersweet Valentine"; Transliteration: "Bitāsuīto Barentain" (Japanese: ビタースイート・バレンタイン)	September 20, 2016
As Valentine's Day approaches, Haruki attempts to repair his relationship with his sister, Haruko, but he has no idea where to start.
12	"Cheer Boys!!"; Transliteration: "Chia Danshi!!" (Japanese: チアダンシ!!)	September 27, 2016
On the eve of the National Cheerleading Championship, the Breakers receive an unexpectedly embarrassing opportunity for self-reflection.
