= Samurai Warriors (TV series) =

Japanese anime television series

- Samurai Warriors key visual
- Genre: Historical
- Anime television film

Samurai Warriors: Legend of the Sanada
- Directed by: Kōjin Ochi
- Produced by: Kazuhiro Asō; Nobuyuki Hosoya; Osamu Saegusa
- Written by: Yuka Yamada
- Music by: Kensuke Inage
- Studio: TYO Animations
- Licensed by: AUS: Madman Entertainment; NA: Funimation
- Original network: TV Tokyo
- Released: March 21, 2014
- Runtime: 50 minutes
- Anime television series

Samurai Warriors
- Directed by: Kōjin Ochi
- Produced by: Kazuhiro Asō; Osamu Saegusa; Hiroyuki Tanaka; Eiichi Sekine; Kōsuke Kazuno
- Written by: Yuka Yamada
- Music by: Kensuke Inage
- Studio: TYO Animations; Tezuka Productions
- Licensed by: AUS: Madman Entertainment; NA: Funimation
- Original network: TV Tokyo
- Original run: January 11, 2015 – March 29, 2015
- Episodes: 12

Samurai Warriors (戦国無双, Sengoku Musou) is a Japanese anime adaptation of Samurai Warriors 4-II. It takes place after the events of its previous animated TV special. Original characters appeared in this narrative to deviate from its base. Voice actors from the game reprise their roles for their respective characters.

The TV special creators also created the TV series. TYO Animations is producing, Yuka Yamada wrote the screenplay, and Aki Tsunaki did the animated character designs. Tezuka Productions is aiding the animation department. It began on January 11, 2015, on TV Tokyo. Until the show ended, Nico Nico Seiga users could post their illustrations up for end card consideration.

Character image song CDs were up for sale during its broadcast. Blu-Ray and DVD extras include a character postcard, a behind-the-scenes booklet, a Sanada brothers radio CD recording, and a Sengoku Musou Shoot serial code for each volume. The first volume includes non-credit versions of the opening and ending. Volumes 3 and up include unaired Sengoku Musou High School segments. The first volume could be purchased at Sengoku Musou Gaiden Seiyuu Ougi Gaiden 2015 Haru to receive autographs from Yukimura and Mitsunari's voice actors. Funimation has licensed the anime series for streaming and home video distribution in North America.

== Plot ==
Number of wars occurred in order to make Japan a peaceful country but no warlords successfully achieved this objective, until Hideyoshi Toyotomi reigned. He created unity across Japan, but his death led to chaos. His son, Hideyori is supposed to succeed the throne but the Tokugawa clan believes that he can't. The conflict between the Toyotomi and Tokugawa clan arises, also between the two brothers in the Sanada clan, Yukimura who sided in the Toyotomi clan and Nobuyuki Sanada who joined Tokugawa. A fateful battle awaits the two.

== Characters ==
Yukimura Sanada
Voiced by: Takeshi Kusao, Yuka Saitō (Young) (Japanese); Jason Liebrecht, Luci Christian (Young) (English)
Nobuyuki Sanada
Voiced by: Daisuke Ono, Jun Shikano (Young) (Japanese); J. Michael Tatum, Morgan Berry (Young) (English)
Mitsunari Ishida
Voiced by: Eiji Takemoto (Japanese); Ian Ferguson (English)
Kanetsugu Naoe
Voiced by: Masaya Takatsuka (Japanese); Ian Sinclair (English)
Kunoichi
Voiced by: Yuko Nagashima (Japanese); Skyler Davenport (English)
Inahime
Voiced by: Makiko Ohmoto (Japanese); Morgan Garrett (English)
Ōtani Yoshitsugu
Voiced by: Satoshi Hino (Japanese); Paul T. Taylor (English)
Tōdō Takatora
Voiced by: Masaya Matsukaze (Japanese); Todd Haberkorn (English)
Sakon Shima
Voiced by: Shinichi Yamada (Japanese); Jeremy Schwartz (English)
Katō Kiyomasa
Voiced by: Tomokazu Sugita (Japanese); Jarrod Greene (English)
Masanori Fukushima
Voiced by: Takahiro Fujimoto (Japanese); Cris George (English)
Naomasa Ii
Voiced by: Katsuyuki Konishi (Japanese); John Burgmeier (English)
Uesugi Kagekatsu
Voiced by: Ryota Takeuchi (Japanese); Greg Carson (English)
Katakura Kojūrō
Voiced by: Ryota Takeuchi (Japanese); Ian Mead Moore (English)
Nene
Voiced by: Wakana Yamazaki (Japanese); Jennifer Seman (English)
Masamune Date
Voiced by: Nobuyuki Hiyama (Japanese); Gregory Lush (English)
Fūma Kotarō
Voiced by: Nobuyuki Hiyama (Japanese); Ray Hurd (English)
Hōjō Ujiyasu
Voiced by: Unsho Ishizuka (Japanese); Jason Douglas (English)
Kaihime
Voiced by: Masami Suzuki (Japanese); Jennifer Green (English)
Lady Hayakawa
Voiced by: Satomi Sato (Japanese); Leah Clark (English)
Hideyoshi Toyotomi
Voiced by: Hideo Ishikawa (Japanese); Jeffrey Schmidt (English)
Hidetada Tokugawa
Voiced by: Shouta Ebina (Japanese); Tyler Walker (English)
Tadakatsu Honda
Voiced by: Akio Otsuka (Japanese); Philip Weber (English)
Ieyasu Tokugawa
Voiced by: Joji Nakata (Japanese); Michael Johnson (English)
Hideyori Toyotomi
Voiced by: Kensho Ono (Japanese); Brandon McInnis (English)
Shingen Takeda
Voiced by: Ryuzaburo Ohtomo (Japanese); R. Bruce Elliott (English)
Suzu
Voiced by: Shino Shimoji (Japanese); Jill Harris (English)
Keiji Maeda
Voiced by: Yuuji Ueda (Japanese); Brandon Potter (English)
Motochika Chōsokabe
Voiced by: Shunzō Miyashita (Japanese); Robert McCollum (English)

== Media ==
=== Anime ===
The opening theme song Ikusa (戦-ikusa-) is performed by Wagakki Band while the ending theme Nadeshikozakura (なでしこ桜) is performed by Wagakki Band.

==== Episode list ====
No.	Title	Original release date
1	"Best Cherry Blossoms of the World"; Transliteration: "Tenkaichi no Sakura" (Japanese: 天下一の桜)	January 11, 2015
Mitsunari and Ieyasu overlook the fog at Sekigahara. Both reflect on the past and the relationships they have built until the conflict, repeating many key scenes from the base game verbatim. The narration resets the setting to the second siege of Odawara Castle. Mitsunari is entrusted by Hideyoshi to take it, and three unsuccessful months pass due to the Hōjō's iron defenses and high morale. Hideyoshi is confident in Mitsunari's success against Ieyasu's doubts. He entrusts Ieyasu to rule Kanto after the Hōjō are defeated. Hidetada protests the decision after their audience, claiming that it will lower their family affluence. Back at Odawara, Mitsunari gives the order for a full strike to take advantage of the Hōjō's lowered supply line. Nobuyuki disapproves, voicing his concerns for the future government. While deliberations continue amongst the war council, Yukimura mounts his steed and charges into battle by himself. He rams through the castle barricade to challenge Ujiyasu to a duel. Kaihime and Lady Hayakawa intercept; Ujiyasu interrupts the moment they are pushed back. The Toyotomi army ride to Yukimura's assistance during their duel. Kunoichi keeps the women at bay, and Nobuyuki eventually reunites with his brother. Ujiyasu is ultimately defeated by Yukimura and gives his last will to the Sanada brothers. Hideyoshi gathers the victors for a cherry blossom banquet to celebrate his unification. Mitsunari speaks in Yukimura's favor when reporting to Hideyoshi; his lord complements his plan regardless and sympathizes with his retainer's hardship. He hopes Mitsunari and Ieyasu can work together for the land's future; realizing they are at odds, he states the same for the Sanada brothers. His illness is hinted when he drops his saucer.
2	"Parting at Inubushi"; Transliteration: "Inubushi no Wakare" (Japanese: 犬伏の別れ)	January 18, 2015
Hideyoshi falls deathly ill. Before he perishes he pleads Ieyasu and Mitsunari to look after his son, Hideyori, for him. Toshiie inherits Hideyoshi's will and dies from illness soon afterwards. Nene leaves Osaka Castle because it pains her to remember her departed husband, entrusting her "children" with the future. Kanetsugu acts as his lord's representative at the conference to decide the clan's future, explaining that the Uesugi require time to establish their newly assigned power in Aizu. Ieyasu mentions a rumor that they're building a new castle and raises concerns of the divide that is beginning within the Toyotomi ranks. Mitsunari's foul attitude and nonpartisan decisions deepen the gap. The Sanada brothers are reminded of the Takeda's fall and seek to protect their family name at all costs. One day at Osaka Castle, they overhear Kiyomasa and Masanori protesting Mitsunari's order to head to Kyushu. Mitsunari remains distant to his childhood friends' outbursts and their separation from him. During their return to Ueda Castle, Nobuyuki and Inahime are called to attend an audience with Ieyasu. The Tokugawa lord has gathered a discrete circle of retainers to defend the remnants of Toyotomi unity, citing the Uesugi's worrisome behavior as an act of self-motivated ambition. Osaka receives word of Ieyasu's march to arms, causing Mitsunari to believe that Ieyasu is targeting the innocent Uesugi for his own ambitions. Yukimura learns his brother has joined Ieyasu but cannot abandon his friendship with Kanetsugu and Mitsunari. Kunoichi delivers an invite to Nobuyuki to meet his brother at a temple in Inubushi. Yukimura tries to convince Nobuyuki to join Mitsunari due to their past obligation to him. Nobuyuki remains adamant because he foresees the Toyotomi's fall. The older brother wants his sibling to be by his side for the conflict. Since neither can give up their set of ideals, they part ways as enemies.
3	"Storm at Ueda Castle"; Transliteration: "Ueda Shiro no Arashi" (Japanese: 上田城の嵐)	January 25, 2015
Movements for Sekigahara starts with each side splitting their forces. Hidetada and Nobuyuki are entrusted to be the mountain supply line; Kagekatsu's attempt to attack Ieyasu's flank is foiled by the Date forces. While the Uesugi clash with the Date in Aizu, Yukimura rallies the men at Ueda Castle to fight for Mitsunari. Although they are aghast to learn the older Sanada brother is their foe, Yukimura restores morale by declaring that their reunion will come with Mitsunari's victory. In spite of everything that has transpired, Yukimura remembers the days when the Sanada clan became homeless after the Takeda's fall. The brothers created Ueda Castle together and he treasures it as the clan's only home. Sincerely believing in his brother's return, he intends to protect it by using the tactics his brother taught him during their childhood. Hidetada's forces near Ueda Castle and the Tokugawa heir seeks to topple it with numbers. Nobuyuki suspects his brother's intentions and tries to remind his liege of their current mission, yet Hidetada believes he is selfishly protecting Yukimura and ignores his recommendations. As he had predicted, the ill prepared Tokugawa troops become victims to a Sanada ambush the next day. The brothers are forced into a duel when Nobuyuki protects Hidetada's escape; Nobuyuki flees after Hidetada is safe. Cross with his failure, Hidetada declares he will continue attacking the castle. During their night reprieve, both siblings reflect on their actions and renew their conflicted resolve. Meanwhile, Mitsunari and Ieyasu's forces have reached Sekigahara. Each side uses the night to rest and consider their movements the next day, many characters repeating key lines they share in the base game. Dawn gives Yukimura strength to attack, and he charges into battle. The episode ends with Yukimura rushing straight for Hidetada.
4	"Sekigahara Sunset"; Transliteration: "Sekigahara no Rakujitsu" (Japanese: 関ヶ原の落日)	February 1, 2015
Continuing from Yukimura's charge from the last episode, Nobuyuki duels his brother again to defend Hidetada. As their strikes intensify, Hidetada tries to eliminate both brothers by ordering his infantry to fire at them. Kunoichi and Tsukimaru drop smoke bombs to end the fighting. Ueda Castle has been damaged by heavy cannon bombardment and the Tokugawa troops withdraw to reunite with Ieyasu's force at Sekigahara. The Uesugi also continue their clash against the Date in Aizu. At Sekigahara, movements for the two sides loosely mirrors history. The fighting begins once Naomasa charges towards the front and the Western army respond with cannon fire. While Sakon directs the vanguard and dies in a duel with Naomasa, Yoshitsugu attempts to deal with Kobayakawa's defection to the Tokugawa forces. He is interrupted by Takatora who tries to mend their broken friendship. Their duel is stopped when Yoshitsugu is fatally wounded by Tokugawa arrows sustained to his unguarded back; he dies in Takatora's arms while apologizing to Mitsunari. Realizing the situation is lost and Tadakatsu threatens his main camp, Mitsunari attempts a desperate final charge towards Ieyasu. He dies from injuries he sustains from his rush; he collapses a few meters away from Ieyasu and fondly remembers Hideyoshi in his final moments. Back at Ueda Castle, Yukimura is helping his injured troops recover from the battle. Nobuyuki and Ina march back to their doorstep to report Mitsunari's death; Yukimura mourns for him.
5	"Life's Destination"; Transliteration: "Inochi no Ikisaki" (Japanese: 命の行先)	February 8, 2015
Ueda Castle is given to Nobuyuki and Yukimura is placed under house arrest. Kunoichi attempts to cheer her master by offering him chestnuts and sticky rice. Her fondness for the treat causes her to reminisce about their childhood days together. Yukimura, however, is preparing himself for his honorable execution. He solemnly terminates her contract to him, urging her to live her own life through her tearful protests. News of Mitsunari's defeat spreads to the west and east. Kanetsugu mourns for his friend as he suggests for the Uesugi to retreat. Nene inspects the battered Sekigahara and weeps when she discovers Mitsunari's broken headpiece. Osaka Castle is buzzing with anxiety, many worried that the Toyotomi will be next. Kaihime, who had been sent to live there after the Hōjō's fall, calms the maids and asks Hideyori for his thoughts in his garden. The young lord faintly concedes to Ieyasu's progress in Toyotomi servitude. The final agenda in the Tokugawa conference is deciding Yukimura's fate. Hidetada urges for his death due to the lives he took at Ueda Castle, yet Tadakatsu and Inahime cite that Hidetada's impetuousness led to Yukimura's retaliation. Takatora stresses that Yukimura is too dangerous to leave alive. In spite of his sincere affections for his brother, Nobuyuki prioritizes the dream of peace and advocates for the death sentence. Ieyasu surprises the room when he commands for Yukimura's exile at Mt. Koya. He scolds the whining Hidetada and places his son under house arrest for his disgraceful conduct. Nobuyuki personally delivers the decree to Ueda Castle; Yukimura is upset to be forced to live in shame and declares his intent to commit suicide in Mitsunari's memory. The older brother snarls for Yukimura to survive and reevaluate his own life; the Sanada's fate now lies in Nobuyuki's hands. During the evening hours, several parties reflect on the verdict. Nobuyuki vents his personal regrets for abandoning Yukimura to Inahime. A bedridden Naomasa curses that the wound he received from Sakon prevented his attendance as he would have made Yukimura perish. Tadakatsu admits his earnest surprise for his lord's mercy and his praise for Yukimura's tenacity. Ieyasu elaborates his intentions to realize peace by driving the definitive nail through perpetual warfare; by sparing the young hero now, he can sacrifice Yukimura to end all samurai values later. Hidetada throws a tantrum in his personal quarters and blames the Sanada responsible for his misfortune. Kotarō cryptically sneaks in with the offer to end his adversaries. Yukimura leaves Ueda the next day. He requests for the cherry blossom tree to be cared for and pardons his group of subordinates to serve his brother. Kunoichi resolves to be with him with Inahime's silent understanding. Losing control over his emotions during their departure, Nobuyuki strains a futile wail to his brother's retreating figure. The episode ends with Ieyasu being named shogun.
6	"Caged Heart"; Transliteration: "Kokoro no Ori" (Japanese: 心の檻)	February 15, 2015
A lone Nobuyuki is ordered to act as Ieyasu's envoy for the vengeful Uesugi. The air is tense when he arrives in Aizu to deliver the decree: slash the Uesugi's wealth to a quarter and relocate to Yonezawa. Kanetsugu acts as the Uesugi correspondent and declares a staunch defiance. Before the Uesugi lunge for his throat, Nobuyuki reasons for him to consider the Uesugi's survival. The Sanada lord shares the severity of leadership and what he has done to protect his clan. The chief advisor feels he is being honest by remembering Yukimura's past impressions of Nobuyuki. Although Kanetsugu briefly hesitates to answer and has lingering regrets for his departed friend, the Uesugi consent without bloodshed. Inahime is relieved when her husband returns to her in one piece. Yukimura is surrounded by Tokugawa guards and listless in his exile, contemplating his next goal in life. Kunoichi is permitted to be by his side. The village residents are unnerved by his arrival, only aware that he is being punished for an untold crime. A peasant girl named Suzu overcomes her fright and lightens his monotony by sharing a rice ball with him. She tells him to forgive and forget before she is chased away by the lax patrol. Nene visits Yukimura at nightfall to deliver Mitsunari's broken headpiece to him. The younger Sanada sibling remarks he is not worthy of it, stating his will to give up war and watch over the new era of peace. While their visitor leaves, Kunoichi shares her uncertainties for her master's well-being. Nene assures her to have faith in him, hinting that peace is still uncertain. She entrusts Kunoichi to give Yukimura his friend's keepsake when and if he chooses to fight again. On the way back to their hut, Kunoichi overhears Suzu's mother in distress. Her daughter has come down with a high fever, and the mother wishes to rush her to a doctor who lives at the bottom of the mountain. The Tokugawa guards block the main road and the other path is a hazardous track in the wilderness. Yukimura overhears the ruckus and insists on carrying the girl himself, despite facing the threat of death for leaving his prison. He intimidates the guards to move and slides down the path. As she assists her master through the terrain, Kunoichi is reminded of her first meeting with Yukimura in their childhood. She had collapsed in the snowy mountains alone, and Yukimura selflessly carried her on his back to safety. Once Suzu is entrusted to the doctor, Yukimura willingly returns to his imprisonment. In the Tokugawa stronghold, Masanori is upset by Ieyasu's growing influence. Kiyomasa assuages him by having faith that Ieyasu will pass the title to Hideyori. They are shocked when Ieyasu passes the title to Hidetada; Nobuyuki feels the timing is too rash and bound to incite Toyotomi loyalists to arms. While Hidetada privately gloats on his new sovereignty, Kotarō corrupts his psyche to hatred by harassing him with illusions of Yukimura. Naomasa continues to fume over Yukimura's survival, even with Tadakatsu's endorsement for their lord. The episode ends with an impaired Naomasa leaving the castle, suited up and carrying his weapon and Yukimura's spear on his mount.
7	"Crimson Blade"; Transliteration: "Guren no Ha" (Japanese: 紅蓮の刃)	February 22, 2015
Nobuyuki is made envoy again to the Toyotomi keep, delivering the news of the second Tokugawa shogun and Ieyasu's wishes to meet with Hideyori at Nijo Castle. Well aware of the Toyotomi retainers' anger towards Ieyasu's disrespect, Hideyori formally excuses Nobuyuki to hold private council with his men. While he poses the risk of starting another war to the quick-tempered crowd, Kaihime guides their guest to his quarters. She vouches for her infatuation in Hideyori's puzzling qualities and trust in his wise restraint. Kiyomasa scouts the streets of Edo and reports that the people are happy. Masanori rants that Ieyasu is taking credit for Hideyoshi's vision by taking away the Toyotomi pedestal. Takatora, who had eavesdropped on the duo before, deems them of being dangerously disloyal to the Tokugawa. Before the young men shed blood, Tadakatsu hollers for them to cease their aggressions. He vows to keep quiet about the incident to Ieyasu. Yukimura has been placed under stricter house arrest and is not permitted to have guests at his adobe. Since she is barred from seeing him, Kunoichi spends time with her pet and catches up with a visiting Inahime. The sister-in-law implores for the duo to endure the exile. She has faith that Yukimura will be pardoned once peace is declared, leaving behind gifts with her departure. During the twilight hours, Naomasa barges into the prisoner's hut and declares an ultimatum to Yukimura: to die fighting or to die as a defenseless criminal. Denouncing violence and clinging to his promise to contemplate his life, Yukimura stops Naomasa's spear thrust by catching its blade. The nearby village is suddenly set on fire by Kotarō and his army of clones. Concern for the village overrides samurai pride, as Naomasa and Yukimura hurry to save them. A Kotarō clone smashes at Naomasa's injury during the fighting, making the damage inevitably fatal. He has enough strength to defeat a few clones, hurl Yukimura's spear, and remind Yukimura of his warrior roots before dying. Yukimura and Kunoichi defend the villagers, and the fires are put out by sunrise. Yukimura gains conviction to fight for the ones dear to him; when Kunoichi gives him Mitsunari's memento, he swears to never again turn his back on their pledge of friendship.
8	"Moment of Truth"; Transliteration: "Kaerazu no Michi" (Japanese: 帰らずの道)	March 1, 2015
To protect the villagers and to resume his life as a warrior, Yukimura and Kunoichi escape Kudoyama. Kiyomasa and Masanori desert the Tokugawa to directly support Hideyori. The two parties' destination is Osaka Castle. After receiving a report of Naomasa's death, Ieyasu orders Masamune to kill the two defectors and Takatora to slay Yukimura before they reach it. He forgoes the generals' respective wishes to switch their targets, hoping to stifle their personal pride as warriors. He privately shares with Tadakatsu his plans for the survivors to discard their past means of mayhem to someday focus on a legislation that can foster peace for the future. Hideyori agrees to meet with Ieyasu to gauge his rival's thoughts. Kaihime reminds him of the retainers who are contentious towards the Tokugawa, an opinion that the pacifistic lord has previously perceived and acknowledges. He seeks to avoid war if possible. Nobuyuki departs and is surrounded by bandits at a mountain path. He flees toward the nearby river to defend himself. Before they attack, a lounging Keiji rises and correctly identifies the bandits as Toyotomi retainers in disguise; he outs them by calling attention to their expensive swords. The wild man proceeds to beat one and intimidates the rest to flee. Nobuyuki and Keiji recognize one another and share a friendly chat. Keiji informs Nobuyuki of Yukimura's escape, causing the elder sibling to leave at once on his mount to intercept. Meanwhile, the Date trap Kiyomasa and Masanori. They are saved by Nene and her smoke bombs. Both men apologize to her for their actions, and she happily praises them for finding their paths in life. Simultaneously, Nobuyuki requests to join Takatora's subjugation. Suspecting mercy and sentimentality from him, Takatora declines and has Nobuyuki taken into custody. While Takatora surrounds the Sanada trio, Keiji rides to their assistance and Nobuyuki breaks free from his confinement. Yukimura and company safely escape and are blocked by a lone Nobuyuki. Yukimura explains his renewed convictions to continue fighting for the late Mitsunari's dream and discards his family ties with Nobuyuki. For now on, they are enemies.
9	"Osaka Tempest"; Transliteration: "Ōsaka no Kaze" (Japanese: 大坂の風)	March 8, 2015
While Nobuyuki reports about Hideyori to Ieyasu, Yukimura's party arrives at Osaka which is filling in with landless samurai. Kaihime meets the trio in the streets and guides them to the Toyotomi lord. Hideyori privately welcomes Yukimura and Keiji for their stay; his refined conduct and ambitious defiance reminds them of the late Hideyoshi. The young lord's ties with Toshiie amuses Keiji enough to enlist into the Toyotomi troops. Before Hideyori leaves for Nijo Castle, Kiyomasa and Masanori arrive to pledge their loyalties to the Toyotomi family again. Despite criticism from nameless observers, Hideyori pardons them and has them accompany him. Ieyasu addresses the rumors that the Toyotomi are preparing for war during their talk and Hidetada questions Yukimura's whereabouts; the young lord fibs that he is merely sheltering the victims of Sekigahara and many men have used the hero's name for their self-benefit. Expressing concern for the future, Ieyasu entreats Hideyori to reside in Edo. Hideyori counters with a mocking proposal for the retired Ieyasu to live at Osaka. Realizing that negotiations are blemished by Hideyori's blooming potential, Ieyasu privately organizes his loyalists to take arms. He believes they should quickly end the Toyotomi to prevent a relapse to the cycle of warfare under Hideyori's name. The Toyotomi inner circle spend an evening bonding before they plan their defensive. Yukimura has scouted the grounds and offers his opinions to defend their pivotal front wall. He suggests for a fortress to be built, which Keiji proudly dubs in Yukimura's honor. During its construction, the Tokugawa forces rout Toyotomi forces scattered along their path. By the time they surround Osaka Castle, they face the completed Sanada Maru.
10	"Extraordinary Fortress"; Transliteration: "Musō no Toride" (Japanese: 無双の砦)	March 15, 2015
The fighting is staged on three fronts. Yukimura defends the south against Takatora, and Keiji protects the east from Kanetsugu. Western gates have the Date army clashing against Kiyomasa and Masanori. The Toyotomi defend their ground well due to exploiting the castle moats and Sanada Maru for a month. Before the Toyotomi concoct a December counteroffensive, Ieyasu arranges for long ranged cannons to directly bombard the main keep. Kunoichi volunteers to take them out alone to allow Yukimura to redirect their defenses. She is mildly successful but is forced to withdraw when she is injured by Takatora. Cannon fire continues for several days and morale on both sides is diminishing. Nobuyuki proposes an armistice before the Tokugawa forces lose to the winter frost. Ieyasu refuses to a cease fire, driving the elder Sanada to approach the Toyotomi himself. Kanetsugu approves his courage and agrees to assist him. Her husband leaves her to avoid placing her in danger; Inahime loses her composure hearing the jeering Hidetada and slaps him. Formations are slightly changed in the next shown charge. This time Kanetsugu and Yukimura's armies face one another, and Keiji duels Tadakatsu. The Date counter the western moats by charging in with their makeshift bridges and infiltrate the castle ground. Kiyomasa takes the bullet from Masamune's pistol for Masanori and dies. Meanwhile, Nobuyuki alone infiltrates the Sanada Maru's hidden entrances to make his way into the main keep. He proposes the truce to Hideyori directly, and Hideyori rationally agrees to it. With peace declared, the cannons stop and each side licks their wounds. Nobuyuki leaves the castle, warning his brother that their next fight shall be to the death.
11	"Isolated Castle"; Transliteration: "Kokō no Shiro" (Japanese: 孤高の城)	March 22, 2015
A ceasefire is put into place. As a sign of trust, the outer moats are filled in and Takatora oversees reconstruction efforts. Aggressions between the two clans remains when Takatora's methods appear reproachful to local loyalists. Yukimura remembers his brother's parting words and warns Hideyori that another war shall be inevitable. Although Osaka Castle lays defenseless and its main keep remains charred from cannon fire, its people stay faithful to the late Hideyoshi's vision for unification. Understanding the hearts of his followers, Hideyori willingly breaks the treaty by declining an order to exile the rogue samurai from his castle. Both sides reflect on the past and steel their hearts for war, each of the Sanada brothers readying themselves to kill one another for their beliefs. Hidetada still feels the sting of Inahime's slap and vents his insecurities to a passing Nobuyuki. Inahime's slight outburst has him realize he is crushing under the pressures of leadership. He feels he is still inferior to his father and loathes war. The elder Sanada brother praises his pacifistic implications yet criticizes him to respect the fallen. If he doesn't mature soon, Hidetada is turning his back to their wishes. Although he pouts at the Sanada lord's support, Hidetada appreciates his opinion. Yukimura and company intercept the Tokugawa forces on the path towards Osaka Castle. Their offensive is admirable but the Tokugawa numbers overwhelm them. Within a short time, the Tokugawa forces plow towards their destination and rest near its borders. Nene pays Ieyasu a private visit, inquiring if this shall be the final battle. She entrusts him to realize her late husband's dream and vanishes, sharing her desire to witness the age that shall begin under Tokugawa rule. Kunoichi wants Yukimura's survival, but her call to duty silences her from speaking her thoughts. Kaihime catches onto her insecurities and encourages her to voice her heart before daybreak. As the Tokugawa troops come closer, Kunoichi tries confessing her feelings to Yukimura. She cuts herself short and instead asks for a promise to revisit the cherry blossom tree at Ueda Castle after the war. He agrees and exchanges a promise of his own: to hold Mitsunari's keepsake and return it to him when the war ends. Kunoichi swears again to protect him in soliloquy. The episode ends with the crimson armored Toyotomi troops roaring a vigorous war cry to their foes.
12	"Mightiest Warrior in Japan"; Transliteration: "Hi no Motoichi no Tsuwamono" (Japanese: 日本一（ひのもといち）の兵（つわもの）)	March 29, 2015
War breaks out with the Toyotomi forces pushing towards the Tokugawa center. Their goal is to distract the main forces away from Yukimura's lone charge towards Ieyasu. Nobuyuki catches onto his brother's plan yet he is obstructed by Keiji. Masanori squares off against Masamune to avenge his friends, eventually disarming him with a definitive punch to the gut. Kaihime fights until the castle is threatened, rushing back to check on her family's safety. A lone Tadakatsu rides towards the battle and intercepts Yukimura. During their duel, Kunoichi spots three Tokugawa snipers and is shot taking them out. Yukimura grieves for her until he notices that Mitsunari's keepsake had prevented the bullet from being fatal. He gains the courage he needs to land a decisive blow on Tadakatsu, impressing the veteran to concede defeat for his last battle. Tadakatsu respectfully watches over the unconscious Kunoichi for him. Nobuyuki is relieved of Keiji shortly after when Kanetsugu replaces him. Both brothers ride towards Ieyasu. Finding the resolve to speak his thoughts as a leader, Hidetada calmly orders Takatora to capture the main keep of Osaka Castle before the war escalates. By the time the general arrives, the main keep is set ablaze by Hideyori. All three leaders feel the era of war has ended, and Hideyori decides to end it with his demise. Defeat halts the Toyotomi ranks yet Yukimura persists to challenge Ieyasu. Nobuyuki catches up with him and fights him to defend Ieyasu. Their duel injures both brothers and is interrupted when Hidetada rides closer with reinforcements. After he again entrusts the future of their clan to his brother, Yukimura chooses to die a warrior's death by charging towards the Tokugawa infantry. His death marks the start of a peaceful age. In the voiceless credits montage, Kaihime is living with the surviving castle maids. Masanori makes a grave for his friends and pays his respects. The others enjoy the era of peace and restoration. Kunoichi recovers from her injuries thanks to Tadakatsu's patronage. She returns to Ueda Castle to fulfill her promise to Yukimura, leaving Mitsunari's keepsake underneath the blooming cherry tree.

== See also ==
- Sengoku Basara: Samurai Kings
- Sengoku Basara: Judge End
