= All Eyes =

2022 horror film

- Official release poster
- Directed by: Todd Greenlee
- Written by: Alex Greenlee
- Produced by: Emily Calhoun; Laurie Cummings; Adam Greenlee; Alex Greenlee; Jeff Greenlee; Lisa Greenlee; Todd Greenlee; Janice Pellam; Tab Pierce
- Starring: Jasper Hammer; Ben Hall; Danielle Evon Ploeger; Nick Ballard
- Cinematography: Austin Warren
- Edited by: Melissa Kent
- Music by: Paxin Tenebris
- Production company: Homefront Pictures
- Distributed by: Gravitas Ventures
- Release date: September 2, 2022 (United States)
- Running time: 87 minutes
- Country: United States
- Language: English

All Eyes is a 2022 popcorn horror/comedy film written and directed by the Greenlee brothers and distributed by Gravitas Ventures. It stars Jasper Hammer as a disgraced podcast host who interviews an eccentric farmer (Ben Hall) who claims to have a monster living in the woods near his house.

== Plot ==
Allen is a disgraced podcast host who was recently fired. Looking for a story to restart his career, he learns about a widowed farmer who lives by the forest and claims there is a monster in the woods. They make a plan to capture and kill the monster.

== Cast ==
- Jasper Hammer as Allen
- Ben Hall as Don
- Danielle Evon Ploeger As Kim
- Nick Ballard as Mark
- Laura Cummings as Jean
- Skyler Davenport as Alice

== Production ==
Filmed in Hobart, Oklahoma and Altus, Oklahoma during July 2020. The film was written by Alex Greenlee and directed by Todd Greenlee. Several of the Greenlee family is listed as part of the film crew. The distributor was Gravitas Ventures.

== Reception ==
Alan Ng of Film Threat gave the film a score of 8.5/10, writing: "Though I found the story about the mutual admiration society between Don and Allen worth watching, the fun of All Eyes is the exciting and thrilling second half about a farmhouse full of booby traps." Dread Central called it, "The Best Recent Indie Horror Film You’ve Never Seen."

== Accolades ==
The film won four awards at various horror film tests across North America out of fifteen nominations.

Award ceremony	Category	Recipient	Result	Ref.
Chicago Horror Film Festival	Best Actor	Jasper Hammer	Won	
Chicago Horror Film Festival	Best Music	Paxin Tenebris	Won	
Chicago Horror Film Festival	Best Feature	Emily Calhoun; Adam Greenlee; Alex Greenlee; Todd Greenlee; Janice Pellam; Laurie Cummings; Tab Pierce; Jeff Greenlee; Lisa Greenlee; Homefront Pictures	Nominated	
Chicago Horror Film Festival	Best Director	Todd Greenlee	Nominated	
Chicago Horror Film Festival	Best Editing	Melissa Kent	Nominated	
Chicago Horror Film Festival	Best Writer	Alex Greenlee	Nominated	
Chicago Horror Film Festival	Best Sound	Eric R. Fischer	Nominated	
Chicago Horror Film Festival	Best Cinematography	Austin Warren	Nominated	
Ethereal Horror Fest	Best Writing	Alex Greenlee; Homefront Pictures	Nominated	
Dickens Horror Film Festival	Best Horror Feature	Emily Calhoun; Adam Greenlee; Alex Greenlee; Todd Greenlee; Janice Pellam; Laurie Cummings; Tab Pierce; Jeff Greenlee; Lisa Greenlee; Homefront Pictures	Won	
North Hollywood Cinefest	Best Actor	Jasper Hammer	Nominated	
North Hollywood Cinefest	Best Cinematography	Austin Warren	Nominated	
North Hollywood Cinefest	Best Director	Todd Greenlee	Nominated	
North Hollywood Cinefest	Best Picture	Emily Calhoun; Adam Greenlee; Alex Greenlee; Todd Greenlee; Janice Pellam; Laurie Cummings; Tab Pierce; Jeff Greenlee; Lisa Greenlee; Homefront Pictures	Nominated	
Sherman Oaks Film Festival	Best Feature Film	Emily Calhoun; Adam Greenlee; Alex Greenlee; Todd Greenlee; Janice Pellam; Laurie Cummings; Tab Pierce; Jeff Greenlee; Lisa Greenlee; Homefront Pictures	Won	
