= Skyler Davenport =

American actor

- Occupation: Actor

Skyler Davenport is an American actor. They are known for their voice acting work, and their role as Sophie in the 2021 thriller See for Me.

== Career ==
In March 2017, Davenport was cast as Kunoichi in the English dub of the Samurai Warriors anime.

In 2021, Davenport starred in their first leading role in the thriller film See for Me as Sophie, a blind former skier. They described Sophie as "morally complicated", adding: "In a way, it's almost like the part of us that we don't want to admit is there. It's just out in the open for her." The film received positive reviews from critics, with praise directed at Davenport's performance. Jude Dry of IndieWire said that Davenport "anchors the action with their instinctual performance, playing Sophie with a pointed ferocity that is clearly masking deep pain."

In 2021, Davenport voiced Azusa Aizawa in I've Been Killing Slimes for 300 Years and Maxed Out My Level. In February 2022, they voiced Najimi Osana in Netflix's English dub of Komi Can't Communicate, and in May, they were cast as Shii Eniwa in the dub of the anime adaptation of Super Cub.

== Personal life ==
Davenport identifies as non-binary and asexual. Davenport is visually impaired, following a stroke caused by a hemiplegic migraine in 2012. They are also autistic and reside in Los Angeles.

== Filmography ==
=== Film ===
Year	Title	Role	Notes
2019	The Unlikely Good Samaritan	Web girl	Voice role
2021	See for Me	Sophie	
2022	All Eyes	Alice	Voice role

=== Television ===
==== Anime ====
Year	Title	Role	Notes
2015	Shomin Sample	Karen Jinryo	
2016	Cheer Boys!!	Haruko Bando	
2017	Luck & Logic	Tamaki Yurine	
2017	Berserk	Sonia	2016 series
2017	Samurai Warriors	Kunoichi	
2019	Sword Art Online: Alicization	Frenica Szeski	
2019	One Piece 3D2Y: Overcoming Ace's Death! Luffy's Pledge to his Friends	Byrnndi World (young)	
2019–present	Welcome to Demon School! Iruma-kun	Eiko, Dari	
2020	Re:Zero − Starting Life in Another World	Minerva	Season 2
2021	JoJo's Bizarre Adventure: Thus Spoke Rohan Kishibe	Confessor's daughter, Mika Hayamura	
2021	I've Been Killing Slimes for 300 Years and Maxed Out My Level	Azusa Aizawa	
2021–22	Komi Can't Communicate	Najimi Osana	
2022	Super Cub	Shii Eniwa	
2022	In the Land of Leadale	Myleene Luskelio	
2023	My Love Story With Yamada-kun at Lv999	Saki	

==== Live action ====
Year	Title	Role	Notes
2015	Salem	Acolyte	
2015	The Leftovers	Drum Circle hippie	
2018	NCIS: Los Angeles	Mellow woman	

=== Video games ===
Year	Title	Role	Notes	Source
2015	HuniePop	Nikki Ann-Marie		
2016	HunieCam Studio	Nikki Ann-Marie		
2016	Anima: Gate of Memories	The Bearer of Calamities		
2017	Regalia: Of Men and Monarchs	Elven woman		
2018	Dissidia Final Fantasy NT	Rinoa Heartilly		
2018	Identity V	Emily Dyer (Doctor)		
2019	Pokémon Masters EX	Valerie		
2020	Final Fantasy VII Remake	Sarah		
2021	Lost Judgment	Akane		
2021	Huniepop 2: Double Date	Sarah "Suki" Stevens		
2021	Arena of Valor	Diao Chan		
2022	Goddess of Victory: Nikke	Belorta, iDoll Ocean, Mana, Arcana		
2023	Honkai: Star Rail	March 7th		
2023	OUTERPLANE	Faenan		
2023	Punishing: Gray Raven	Bianca		
2024	Unicorn Overlord	Scarlett, Norbelle		
2024	Genshin Impact	Citlali		
2024	The Legend of Heroes: Trails Through Daybreak	Mare		
2025	The Legend of Heroes: Trails Through Daybreak II	Mare		
2025	Rune Factory: Guardians of Azuma	Clarice		
2025	Honkai: Star Rail	Evernight		
