= The Genius Prince's Guide to Raising a Nation Out of Debt =

Japanese light novel series

- The Genius Prince's Guide to Raising a Nation Out of Debt (Hey, How About Treason?)
- First light novel volume cover, featuring Wein Salema Arbalest (center) and Ninym Ralei (right)

天才王子の赤字国家再生術〜そうだ、売国しよう〜 (Tensai Ōji no Akaji Kokka Saisei Jutsu ~Sō da, Baikoku Shiyō~)
- Genre: Fantasy comedy
- Light novel
- Written by: Toru Toba
- Illustrated by: fal_maro
- Published by: SB Creative
- English publisher: NA: Yen Press
- Imprint: GA Bunko
- Original run: May 12, 2018 – present
- Volumes: 12
- Manga
- Written by: Toru Toba
- Illustrated by: Emuda
- Published by: Square Enix
- Magazine: Manga Up!
- Original run: October 2019 – present
- Volumes: 20
- Anime television series
- Directed by: Masato Tamagawa
- Written by: Deko Akao
- Music by: Toshihiko Sahashi
- Studio: Yokohama Animation Laboratory
- Licensed by: Crunchyroll (streaming); SA/SEA: Muse Communication
- Original network: Tokyo MX, BS NTV, AT-X
- Original run: January 11, 2022 – March 29, 2022
- Episodes: 12

The Genius Prince's Guide to Raising a Nation Out of Debt (Hey, How About Treason?) (天才王子の赤字国家再生術〜そうだ、売国しよう〜, Tensai Ōji no Akaji Kokka Saisei Jutsu ~Sō da, Baikoku Shiyō~) is a Japanese light novel series, written by Toru Toba and illustrated by fal_maro. SB Creative has released the light novel series since May 2018 under their GA Bunko label. The light novel is licensed in North America by Yen Press. A manga adaptation with art by Emuda has been serialized online since October 2019 via Square Enix's online manga magazine Manga Up!. An anime television series adaptation by Yokohama Animation Laboratory aired from January to March 2022.

== Plot ==
In the far north of the continent of Varno lies the small country of the Kingdom of Natra. After King Owen collapses from illness, the job of running the country falls to his son, Crown Prince, now Prince Regent, Wein Salema Arbalest. Alongside his aide, Ninym Ralei, Wein upholds the image of a genius prince that leads the nation with an iron hand. However, behind the scenes, Wein bemoans his fate, hoping for an opportunity to commit treason by selling off his home country and escaping from his duties.

== Characters ==
=== Main characters ===
Wein Salema Arbalest (ウェイン・サレマ・アルバレスト, Wein Sarema Arubaresuto)
Voiced by: Soma Saito (Japanese); Dallas Reid (English)
The protagonist, Prince Wein is the extremely capable heir to the royal line of the Kingdom of Natra. He is lauded as a genius and is loved by the citizens of his country. However, underneath his princely facade lies a treasonous attitude of wanting to ignore all of his duties as much as he possibly can which normally ends with pain inflicted on him by his aide, Ninym. During the anime, there were multiple occasions which showed that Wein and Ninym's affection for each other goes beyond that of close friend.
Ninym Ralei (ニニム・ラーレイ, Ninimu Rārei)
Voiced by: Rie Takahashi (Japanese); Michelle Rojas (English)
She is a close friend and personal aide to Prince Wein who comes from an oppressed minority known as the Flahm. Ninym also attended the Empire's Royal Academy with Wein. She is aware of his treasonous side but she pushes him to do what is right because she knows he has the intelligence, foresight, diligence and martial prowess to save the kingdom and everyone he and she are close to from evil forces. While she said that she could never wed Wein due to the distinct difference in their social status, it could be seen that she deeply values Wein's declaration that "she is his heart".

=== Kingdom of Natra ===
Falanya Elk Arbalest (フラーニャ・エルク・アルバレスト, Furānya Eruku Arubaresuto)
Voiced by: Sayaka Senbongi (Japanese); Amber Lee Connors (English)
The younger sister of Prince Wein, Princess Falanya studies politics in the hopes that she can eventually help her older brother despite believing her older brother to not have any faults that she can fill in. She was finally able to fulfil this wish in the Mealtars incident as it was Falanya that provided the breakthrough necessary for her older brother to concoct his plan to outwit his opposing conspirators.
Nanaki Ralei (ナナキ・ラーレイ, Nanaki Rārei)
Voiced by: Yuki Sakakihara (Japanese); Elizabeth Maxwell (English)
He is Princess Falanya's ninja bodyguard.

=== Earthwold Empire ===
Lowellmina Earthwold (ロウェルミナ・アースワルド, Rowerumina Āsuwarudo)
Voiced by: Nao Tōyama (Japanese); Alexis Tipton (English)
The second princess of the Earthwold Empire. Friends with Wein and Ninym when they attended the Academy, she pretended to be Lowa the daughter of a rural aristocrat.
Fisch Brandel (フィシュ・ブランデル, Fishu Buranderu)
Voiced by: Yoko Hikasa (Japanese); Kimberly Grace (English)
Ambassador between the Empire and the Kingdom of Natra.

=== Kingdom of Solgest ===
Gruyere Solgest (グリュエール・ソルジェスト, Guryuēru Sorujesuto)
Voiced by: Akio Otsuka (Japanese); Chris Guerrero (English)
Torcheila Solgest (トルチェイラ・ソルジェスト, Torucheira Sorujesuto)
Voiced by: Rie Kugimiya (Japanese); Sarah Wiedenheft (English)

=== Kingdom of Marden ===
Zenovia Marden (ゼノヴイア マrデン, Xenovia Madden)
Voiced by: Yuki Nakashima (Japanese); Dawn M. Bennett (English)
She is the first and oldest princess of the Kingdom of Marden. Additionally, she is also the resistance army leader under her military attire and cover name Zeno (ゼノ, Xeno), who acts as an aide to Crown Prince Helmuth, and actively pursues to retake her kingdom from the neighboring Kingdom of Cavarin.

=== Other characters ===
Hagal (ハガル, Hagaru)
Voiced by: Takayuki Sugo (Japanese); Brian Mathis (English)
Raklum (ラークルム, Rākurumu)
Voiced by: Daiki Hamano (Japanese); Gabe Kunda (English)
Caldmellia (カルドメリア, Karudomeria)
Voiced by: Mamiko Noto (Japanese); Natalie Hoover (English)
Demetrio Earthwold (ディメトリオ・アースワルド, Dimetorio Āsuwarudo)
Voiced by: Ryuichi Kijima (Japanese); J. Michael Tatum (English)
Bardloche Earthwold (バルドロッシュ・アースワルド, Barudorosshu Āsuwarudo)
Voiced by: Kenichirou Matsuda (Japanese); Cris George (English)
Manfred Earthwold (マンフレッド・アースワルド, Manfureddo Āsuwarudo)
Voiced by: Kengo Kawanishi (Japanese); Brandon McInnis (English)

== Media ==
=== Light novel ===
The light novel is written by Toru Toba and illustrated by fal_maro. SB Creative has released twelve volumes since May 2018 under their GA Bunko label. The light novel is licensed in North America by Yen Press, and the first volume was released digitally on September 3, 2019.

No.	Original release date	Original ISBN	English release date	English ISBN
1	May 12, 2018	978-4-79739-703-1	September 3, 2019	978-1-97538-519-4
Chapter 1: The Name's Wein Salema Arbalest; Chapter 2: The Troubled Prince on the Battlefield; Chapter 3: Too Much of a Good Thing; Chapter 4: My Heart; Epilogue
2	September 14, 2018	978-4-79739-900-4	December 24, 2019	978-1-97538-517-0
Chapter 1: Hey, How About a Political Marriage?; Chapter 2: A Visit From the Imperial Princess; Chapter 3: A Fated Meeting, A Predestined Reunion; Chapter 4: Circling Schemes; Chapter 5: A Clash of Opinion; Chapter 6: Double Ingenuity; Epilogue
3	January 12, 2019	978-4-81560-115-7	June 23, 2020	978-1-97530-998-5
Chapter 1: Hey, How About an International Conference?; Chapter 2: A Confidential Meeting; Chapter 3: Gathering of the Holy Elites / Individual Bargains; Chapter 4: The Traitor; Chapter 5: Yesterday's Enemy Is Today's...; Epilogue
4	June 14, 2019	978-4-81560-272-7	September 22, 2020	978-1-97531-000-4
Chapter 1: Hey, How About Relying On My Little Sister?; Chapter 2: Falanya's Resolution; Chapter 3: Three Imperial Princes; Chapter 4: A Glimpse into Family Ties; Chapter 5: Upset in the Merchant City; Chapter 6: Girl Icon; Epilogue
5	October 12, 2019	978-4-81560-380-9	December 15, 2020	978-1-97531-370-8
Chapter 1: Hey, How About Feeding My Massive Ego?; Chapter 2: Visitors; Chapter 3: Gruyere the Beast King; Chapter 4: Two Battlefields; Epilogue
6	February 14, 2020	978-4-81560-535-3	April 27, 2021	978-1-97531-983-0
Chapter 1: Hey, How About Heading South?; Chapter 2: From Surprise Incident to Surprise Meeting; Chapter 3: Rainbow Crown; Chapter 4: The Loss of Legends; Chapter 5: At the End of a Rainbow; Epilogue
7	June 12, 2020	978-4-81560-709-8	August 31, 2021	978-1-97532-160-4
Chapter 1: Hey, How About Calling the Imperial Capital?; Chapter 2: Two Sides of Living History; Chapter 3: An Inescapable Conclusion; Chapter 4: A Whirlwind Strategy; Chapter 5: A Wish; Epilogue
8	November 12, 2020	978-4-81560-888-0	February 8, 2022	978-1-97533-587-8
Chapter 1: Hey, How About Another International Conference?; Chapter 2: Evil Spirits and Devilish Schemes; Chapter 3: Those Who Stir Storms; Chapter 4: The Gathering in Action; Epilogue
9	March 12, 2021	978-4-81560-942-9	May 17, 2022	978-1-97533-911-1
Chapter 1: Hey, How About Unification?; Chapter 2: The Ulbeth Alliance; Chapter 3: Oleom and Lejoutte; Chapter 4: The Great Marriage Champion; Chapter 5: Connected Casuality; Chapter 6: A Signing Ceremony; Epilogue
10	August 12, 2021	978-4-81561-095-1	July 18, 2023	978-1-97534-202-9
Chapter 1: Hey, How About a Two-Front War?; Chapter 2: Eastern Levetia; Chapter 3: Political Players; Chapter 4: The Will to Retaliate; Chapter 5: The Final Move; Chapter 6: A Test of Skill; Epilogue
11	January 14, 2022	978-4-81561-459-1	November 21, 2023	978-1-97535-220-2
Chapter 1: Hey, How About Becoming Empress?; Chapter 2: The Die Is Cast; Chapter 3: Strang; Chapter 4: Glen; Chapter 5: Wein; Chapter 6: Lowellmina; Epilogue
12	September 14, 2022	978-4-81561-641-0	July 23, 2024	978-1-97537-081-7
Chapter 1: Hey, How About Running Away?; Chapter 2: A Fiery Omen; Chapter 3: Anxiety, Unease, and...; Chapter 4: Past, Present, and...; Chapter 5: Ambush; Chapter 6: That Which Is Precious; Epilogue

=== Manga ===
A manga adaptation with art by Emuda has been serialized online since October 2019 via Square Enix's online manga magazine Manga Up!. It has currently been collected in twenty tankōbon volumes.

No.	Japanese release date	Japanese ISBN
1	February 12, 2020	978-4-75756-519-7
2	November 7, 2020	978-4-75756-734-4
3	April 7, 2021	978-4-75757-183-9
4	September 7, 2021	978-4-75757-455-7
5	December 7, 2021	978-4-75757-611-7
6	March 7, 2022	978-4-75757-787-9
7	July 7, 2022	978-4-75758-003-9
8	November 7, 2022	978-4-75758-232-3
9	April 7, 2023	978-4-75758-501-0
10	September 7, 2023	978-4-75758-760-1
11	December 7, 2023	978-4-75758-931-5
12	March 7, 2024	978-4-75759-074-8
13	July 5, 2024	978-4-75759-283-4
14	November 7, 2024	978-4-75759-504-0
15	March 7, 2025	978-4-75759-712-9
16	July 7, 2025	978-4-75759-929-1
17	November 7, 2025	978-4-30100-144-7
18	March 6, 2026	978-4-30100-353-3
19	July 7, 2026	978-4-30100-607-7
20	November 6, 2026	978-4-30100-851-4

=== Anime ===
An anime television series adaptation was announced during a livestream for the "GA Fes 2021" event on January 31, 2021. The series is produced by NBCUniversal Entertainment Japan and animated by Yokohama Animation Laboratory, with Makoto Tamagawa serving as director, Xin Ya Cai serving as assistant director, Deko Akao handling series composition, Ryūnosuke Ōji designing characters, and Toshihiko Sahashi composing the music. The opening theme song, "Level", is performed by Nagi Yanagi in collaboration with The Sixth Lie, while the ending theme song, "Hitori to Kimi to" (Alone and With You), is performed by Yoshino Nanjō. The series aired from January 11 to March 29, 2022, on Tokyo MX, BS NTV, and AT-X.

Funimation streamed the series outside of Asia, and the distribution rights eventually transferred to Crunchyroll after Sony's acquisition of the company. On March 7, 2022, Funimation announced that the series would receive an English dub, which premiered the following day. Muse Communication licensed the series in South and Southeast Asia; and is available to watch on Muse Asia's YouTube channel and its regional variants, iQIYI, Bilibili in Southeast Asia, Catchplay in Indonesia and Singapore, meWATCH in Singapore, TrueId in Thailand, as well as Genflix and Sushiroll in Indonesia.

NBCUniversal Entertainment Japan released the series in Japan across 4 Blu-ray volumes, each volume containing 3 episodes. The first volume was released on March 30, 2022, with subsequent volumes releasing monthly until June 29, 2022. Crunchyroll released the complete series on Blu-ray in North America on January 17, 2023.

==== Episode list ====
No.	Title	Directed by	Written by	Storyboarded by	Original release date
1	"The Prince Who Would Sell His Kingdom"; Transliteration: "Sō da, Kuni o Utte Tonzura Shiyō" (Japanese: そうだ、国を売ってトンズラしよう)	Genkō Abe	Deko Akao	Makoto Tamagawa	January 11, 2022
Prince Wein of Natra Kingdom is beloved by the people but in secret detests his responsibilities and treasonously plots to sell the kingdom. Natra Kingdom has long winters and no decent farmland, thus the economy is poor and its debts extensive. The only one who knows of Wein's selfishness is his assistant Ninym Ralei who tries to keep him in line. The rich King of Marden is incompetent and hated by his citizens so he plans to successfully invade Natra to make himself popular. Wein hopes to badly defend Natra then negotiate to exchange the kingdom for money. Unfortunately, due to a deal he made with Earthwold Empire months ago for funding and training, plus a rousing improvised speech, his army actually defeats Marden, to Wein's great frustration. Knowing he must keep his generals loyalty and maintain his façade as a great ruler Wein suggests invading Marden's largest gold mine, hoping his generals will respect his courageous suggestion but reject the idea as too dangerous. Unfortunately the generals all agree to the invasion. Wein holds out hope the invasion will fail but the mine is taken easily, bringing wealth to Natra and further convincing everybody Wein is a great ruler.
2	"Wein Salema Arbalest, Battlefield Tactician"; Transliteration: "Senjō no Wein Sarema Arubaresuto" (Japanese: 戦場のウェイン・サレマ・アルバレスト)	Xinya Cai	Deko Akao	Xinya Cai	January 18, 2022
Wein learns from his chief miner the mine is actually worthless. Marden's King Fuschtarre is convinced by his corrupt advisors to send General Drawood and his army to retake the mine, even though it leaves their borders undefended. Still hoping to make a profit and suspecting Fuschtarre doesn't know the mine is worthless; Wein decides to defend the mine for one month then let Fuschtarre buy it back. After weeks of fighting Drawood sends Commander Logan to negotiate peace, however, when Logan grossly insults Ninym Wein beheads Logan then personally infiltrates Drawood's camp and kills him for insulting Ninym, revealing just how strong his feelings for her are. It is revealed Wein is more capable than he seems as he had attended Earthwold's Military Academy and came first in every class, an embarrassment to Earthwold who kept his test scores a state secret. Wein learns Marden was invaded through its unprotected border by the Cavarin Kingdom and Fuschtarre is dead, ending his plan to sell back the mine. Thankfully his chief miner discovers a new highly profitable gold seam. Wein plans to celebrate but Ninym threatens him into returning to work, further reinforcing his desire to somehow sell the kingdom and retire.
3	"A Proposal as a Pretext"; Transliteration: "Sō da, Seiryaku Kekkon Shiyō" (Japanese: そうだ、政略結婚しよう)	Hiroyuki Tsuchiya	Tomoko Shinozuka	Toshiya Niidome	January 25, 2022
Princess Lowa of Earthwold, a friend of Wein's and Ninym's from the academy, offers a political marriage. Wein is suspicious as Lowa is a notorious troublemaker. Lowa privately reveals her three older brothers are fighting to become emperor, so she wants Wein's help to become Empress. Wein is still suspicious as Lowa's visit has coincided with weaponry being smuggled into Natra. Falanya, Wein's younger sister, wonders why Wein doesn't marry Ninym, but Ninym claims marriage is impossible due to her Flahm people being discriminated against, so she is content knowing Wein loves her and only her. Lowa and Ninym remember their other friends Glen and Strang while Lowa reveals she has problems with Gerard Antgatal, who wants to marry her. Wein tutors Falanya in inter-kingdom politics, focusing on Antgatal. The current Antgatal Marquess, Gerard's father Grenache, is a notorious tyrant. Lowa remembers how at the academy Wein recognised her ambition and bluntly told her to take what she wants, perhaps by starting a war. He also bluntly told her he would avoid helping at all costs, so she would have to drag him into her war by trickery, which she is currently scheming to do and wonders how Wein will try to manoeuvre his way out of it.
4	"It Takes Two to Tango"; Transliteration: "Futari no Chibō" (Japanese: 二人の知謀)	Takayuki Hamana	Tomoko Shinozuka	Takayuki Hamana	February 1, 2022
Wein confirms the nations conquered by the Empire are staging a rebellion. He also correctly guesses Lowa's brothers are too busy fighting each other to have noticed, so Lowel is trying to manipulate Grenache into rebelling early by using her betrothal as bait. Gerard arrives to claim Lowel as his fiancé. Wein reasons Lowel will manipulate Gerard into ending his father's rebellion using Natra's army, so Wein must try not to be manipulated into giving over his army. Gerard learns Wein was trained with a sword and asks for a demonstration. Wein intends the duel to be a draw but Gerard is so incompetent Wein wins without trying. Furious, Gerard attempts to stab Wein in the back but is so drunk he smashes through a window and falls to his death. Grenache believes Gerard was assassinated by Wein and Lowel and prepares for war. The conspirators behind the rebellion are afraid war will cause the rebellion to be discovered. Wein is furious he now faces war with Gairan and probably the Empire. Lowel decides to focus on crushing the rebellion with Wein's assistance, but Wein reveals their current budget has limited Natra's army to only 500 men, instead they must somehow expose the rebellion so war can be avoided entirely.
5	"A Diabolical Scheme"; Transliteration: "Sō da, Tsumi o Kabusete Miyō" (Japanese: そうだ、罪を被せてみよう)	Motohiro Abe	Tomoko Shinozuka	Motohiro Abe	February 8, 2022
Wein pays an official visit to Antgatal to return Gerard's body to Grenache and discuss peace. The conspirators scramble to work out what Wein is up to. Wein reveals that Lowa knows about the rebellion but offers to let Grenache claim innocence by claiming Gerard was the real conspirator. Grenache asks for time to consider so Wein leaves, only for Grenache to send the conspirators after Wein to get revenge for Gerard. Wein had been expecting this and realises the conspirators are all from the Western Kingdom and had clearly tried to manipulate Grenache into doing their dirty work for the rebellion, but the plot has now failed. Wein defeats them while Nanaki, Wein's assassin bodyguard, stops other conspirators from destroying evidence in Grenache's castle. Grenache chases Wein as he escapes back toward Natra, only to find Wein has stationed his army on the border, trapping Grenache between Wein and Lowa who arrives with her own Imperial soldiers. Having been exposed and captured, Grenache admits to everything. With her mission successful Lowa calls off her engagement to Wein, though Ninym tricks her into confessing she likes Wein. Wein admits there were easier ways he could have defeated Granache, but this way means Lowa now has control over him for use in the future. Lowa returns to the empire hoping one day to be Empress so she Wein and Ninym can be friends like they used to.
6	"Holy Intrigue!"; Transliteration: "Sō da, Kokusai Kaigi ni Deyō" (Japanese: そうだ、国際会議に出よう)	Nobuhiro Mutō	Keiichirō Ōchi	Nobuhiro Mutō, Makoto Tamagawa	February 15, 2022
Wein is forced to visit Cavarin Kingdom for Spirit Festival, a holiday of the Levetian religion. During the journey he visits his captured gold mine and worries trouble might arise following the retirement of his general, Hagel. Several Natran nobles, led by a woman named Ibis, plot to seize Wein's throne. Wein is ambushed by soldiers disguised as bandits but is rescued by remnants of Marden's army led by General Zeno. Zeno threatens to assassinate Wein to prevent him allying with Cavarin, but as Wein suspects the bandits were Cavarin soldiers he offers Zeno access to Cavarin via his diplomatic status, allowing her to meet rulers of other kingdoms, potential allies against Cavarin. At Cavarin's capital, Tristoria, Wein meets General Levert and suspects he was behind the fake bandit ambush. Wein meets King Ordalasse while Zeno almost assassinates Holonyeh, treasonous former advisor to her deceased king Fuschtarre. Ordalasse introduces Wein to the Holy Elite, Levetian's ruling members, and shocks everyone by inviting Wein as a new member. Wein meets privately with Elite Caldmellia, but leaves when she asks Wein to wipe out the remnants of Marden's army in exchange for her accepting him as Elite. It is revealed Caldmellia is allied with Owl, one of the Antgatal conspirators who lost an arm duelling with Wein. Ninym finds proof Levert is conspiring to kill Wein and overthrow Natra. At the same time Ibis and the nobles take over Wein's goldmine.
7	"Yesterday's Enemy Is Today's..."; Transliteration: "Kinō no Teki wa Kyō no" (Japanese: 昨日の敵は今日の)	Kōji Kobayashi, Toshiya Niidome, Xinya Cai	Keiichirō Ōchi	Xinya Cai	February 22, 2022
Wein realises that by elevating him to Elite Ordalasse hopes to put Wein in his debt. Ordalasse casually reveals he had a daughter who disappointed him, so he executed his wife, claiming she conceived their daughter in an affair with another man. He then enrages Wein when he asks to purchase Flahm citizens of Natra kingdom, like Ninym, so he can hunt them for sport. Wein murders Ordalasse while Zeno gets her revenge by murdering Holonyeh. Caldmellia frames Levert for conspiring against Ordalasse and moves to seize power in Cavarin. Out of twisted gratitude to Wein she sends a message informing him Natra has been seized by corrupt Natran nobles. With this information Wein leads Levert and his men into a trap between the treasonous noble's army and the Marden soldiers, forcing Levert to attack both. Wein also reveals he faked General Hagal's retirement, who arrives and destroys Levert and the Natran traitors. Zeno reveals she is actually Marden's princess, though Wein knew this the whole time. Ibis reports to her master, Caldmellia, who begins plotting how to cause even more chaos. Zeno requests Marden become a vassal state to Natra, allowing Wein to rule Marden as well, which will make Wein's life even more difficult, amusing both Ninym and Zeno.
8	"I'll Give It a Shot"; Transliteration: "Sō da, Watashi ga Yatte Miyō" (Japanese: そうだ、私がやってみよう)	Shin'ya Kawabe	Keiichirō Ōchi	Makoto Tamagawa	March 1, 2022
Lowa attends the Summit of Imperial Heirs in Mealtars Merchant City where she and her brothers will negotiate for the throne. Lowa invites Wein but Falanya attends instead. Wein had intended to claim he was busy so as to annoy Lowa, not expecting Falanya to volunteer. Wein sends Ninym and Nanaki as chaperones and thoroughly educates Falanya about the princes. Manfred gains support through cunning and bribery, Bardloche is a soldier and has the support of the military, and the eldest Demetrio is a notorious troublemaker. Lowa wants Falanya to support her publicly but is told Wein has no interest in an alliance with the Empire unless Lowa is its Empress. Falanya learns of the Citizens Assembly where common merchants create laws, interesting Falanya that Mealtars is ruled by its citizens. Demetrio decides Falanya's presence instead of Wein's is an insult. Pretending he desires alliance with Natra he asks Falanya to marry him, planning to abuse her terribly once she becomes his wife. He is surprised when Falanya shows knowledge of political royal marriages allowing her to temporarily refuse his proposal. Losing his temper Demetrio swears to ruin Natra once he becomes Emperor, only for Wein to suddenly appear, having heard Demetrio's angry outburst.
9	"The Little Princess Who Could"; Transliteration: "Gūzō Shōjo" (Japanese: 偶像少女)	Toshiya Niidome, Kōji Kobayashi	Keiichirō Ōchi	Toshiya Niidome	March 8, 2022
Wein agrees to the marriage but claims he and Lowa will marry as well. Realising that two royal marriages would give Natra enormous power in the Empire Demetrio agrees to discuss the matter later. Wein, who displays symptoms of ill health, worries the Levetian's will try stop Mealtars from joining the Empire. Lowa is worried the Summit will fail. Worried about Wein's intentions Manfred orders him assassinated. Falanya spends more time at the Citizens Assembly and is surprised when the merchants invite her to join in their debate. At his next meeting with Demetrio Wein realises the tea is poisoned by Manfred's assassin. Thinking Wein is trying to insult his hospitality Demetrio drinks the tea himself before Wein can stop him and collapses. Demetrio survives but Manfred and Bardloche blame Mealtars and surround the city with their armies. Wein decides they should escape to Natra, but Levetia's army also arrives, supposedly to save Mealtars from Manfred and Bardloche. The situation worsens Wein's health and he collapses. Falanya gives a speech to the panicking Assembly. Wein awakens and shares a caring moment with Ninym. Reasoning that citizens are more important than the city Falanya evacuates all 30,000 citizens who walk right past the stunned armies to ask a similarly stunned Caldmelia for asylum. Knowing Levetia can't cope with 30,000 refugees Wein steps in with a suggestion.
10	"A Bubble Economy Inflates an Ego"; Transliteration: "Sō da, Baburu ni Norō" (Japanese: そうだ、バブルに乗ろう)	Yoshihide Ibata	Tomoko Shinozuka	Tsukasa Sunaga	March 15, 2022
Wein suggests Mealtars' citizens fight for themselves by buying the weapons from Levetia's army. Impressed, Caldmellia almost refuses just to see Wein panic, but her King Gruyere accepts. Manfred and Bardloche meet with Wein who claims Demetrio planned his own failed poisoning. Despite knowing this is a blatant lie Bardloche and Manfred are forced to agree to avoid war. Lowa is surprised Wein only got involved because Falanya likes Mealtars and he didn't want her first political experience to end in failure. Ninym is impressed Wein has abandoned his plan to sell Natra, even though it is for yet more selfish reasons. Gruyere invites Wein to a ceremony in Soljest kingdom. Wein visits Marden where he suspects Zeno will ask for a political marriage. Despite the advantages for Marden Zeno never mentions marriage. Zeno asks why Wein concerns himself with the wellbeing of commoners, so Wein points out that far back enough in history all royal families began with a commoner who distinguished themselves and founded the family line, so commoners all have the potential for nobility in the future, so it is wise to be wary of them in the present. He attempts to goad Zeno into discussing marriage, but having decided she would be an unfit queen for a king like Wein, she claims he is "not her type", depressing him that his childish plan to thwart her proposal has failed.
11	"By Hook or Crook"; Transliteration: "Sagi da kedo Shirabakkureyō" (Japanese: 詐欺だけどしらばっくれよう)	Tamaki Nakatsu	Deko Akao	Tamaki Nakatsu	March 22, 2022
Western Kingdoms under the Levetian religion refuse to trade with the Empire, so Wein fraudulently labels Imperial goods as Natran and sells them to the West via Marden. Prime Minister Sirgis of Delunio confronts Wein over the fraud but Wein dismisses him. Arriving at Soljest Wein is impressed by its trading ports. Wein suspects Soljests King Gruyere will try to prevent Imperial goods being traded and hopes to manipulate Gruyere against the hostile Delunio kingdom. Princess Tolcheila, Gruyere's daughter, manages to distract Wein with Soljest's finest cuisine. Sirgis demands back land it leased to Marden, arguing that since Marden is now part of Natra, Marden kingdom no longer exists, voiding the lease. Wein suspects Gruyere will try to assassinate him but when Gruyere meets with Wein he is surprised Gruyere claims that, despite being a Levetian Elite, he does not think of Flahm's like Ninym as devils and is quite liberal. He agrees to an alliance with Natra, but as Wein leaves it is revealed Gruyere is working with Sirgis. After returning to Natra Wein is told Delunio has invaded Marden and Soljest has declared war on Natra. Zeno suggests Natra somehow make peace with Delunio, but Wein declares he has a plan to turn everything upside down.
12	"A Really Motivated Seller"; Transliteration: "Sō da, Yappari Kuni o Utte Tonzura Shiyō" (Japanese: そうだ、やっぱり国を売ってトンズラしよう)	Makoto Tamagawa	Deko Akao	Makoto Tamagawa	March 29, 2022
Sirgis plots to donate the recaptured Marden land to the Levetian church in exchange for becoming an Elite. While negotiating with Sirgis Wein offers to assassinate Gruyere, pointing out if Soljest keeps growing in power it will likely go to war with Natra and Delunio. Overconfident, Sirgis offers to accept Natran refugees after the war so Wein declares Natra's 800,000 citizens will move into Delunio as refugees immediately. Knowing Wein already did something similar with Mealtars' 30,000 citizens, Sirgis panics. Wein also falsely claims clothing he sold to Delunio via Marden was covered in a slow acting poison and Delunio's citizens will soon die. Totally outmanoeuvred by Wein's daring and scheming Sirgis is forced to agree to Wein's terms. Gruyere is defeated and imprisoned in Natra. Wein reveals Sirgis' surrender cost him his political reputation and is no longer a threat. Gruyere agrees to sign peace declarations, but first demands to know what is truly in Wein's heart that drives him to such extremes. Wein's answer first shocks then highly amuses Gruyere. The next day Ninym points out achieving peace has cost Natra most of its wealth and its peaceful relationship with the Levetian church. Wein throws a tantrum as he realises his plan to sell Natra is further away than ever and he has a lot of work to do to fix it.
