= Yuki Sakakihara =

Japanese voice actor (born 1995)

- 榊原優希
- Born: 18 September 1995 (age 31)
- Occupation: Voice actor
- Years active: 2018–present
- Employer: 81 Produce
- Notable work: The Genius Prince's Guide to Raising a Nation Out of Debt as Nanaki Ralei; My One-Hit Kill Sister as Asahi Ikusaba; Ayaka: A Story of Bonds and Wounds as Yako Amano; Hypnosis Mic: Division Rap Battle: Rhyme Anima as Jyushi Aimono

Yuki Sakakihara (Japanese: 榊原 優希, Hepburn: Sakakihara Yūki; born 18 September 1995) is a Japanese voice actor from Ibara, affiliated with 81 Produce. He is known for starring as Shu Ujigawa in From Argonavis, Nanaki Ralei in The Genius Prince's Guide to Raising a Nation Out of Debt, Asahi Ikusaba in My One-Hit Kill Sister, Yako Amano in Ayaka: A Story of Bonds and Wounds, Jyushi Aimono in Hypnosis Mic: Division Rap Battle: Rhyme Anima and Aiki Hirose in Go for It, Nakamura!.

== Biography ==
Yuki Sakakihara, a native of Ibara, Okayama Prefecture, was born on 18 September 1995. He lived "[so] deep in the mountains of Okayama Prefecture" it was difficult for him to go out for karaoke.

Inspired by a class reading in elementary school and experience with narrating his high school student council's film for the cultural festival, he decided to go into voice acting. After being eliminated in the finals of the NHK-sponsored Seiyū Stadium audition, he attended Amusement Media Academy at night in parallel with his day classes at a university, where he was a biology major. He graduated from Amusement Media Academy in 2017, and he chose 81 Produce as his agency after meeting with Kujira, who was a family connection to one of his college friends.

In 2018, Sakakihara became part of Sega's Readyyy! multimedia franchise as Uta Kamijō. In February 2020, he became part of Bushiroad's From Argonavis franchise as Shu Ujigawa, the vocalist of in-universe band Epsilon Phi. In September 2021, it was announced that he would voice Nanaki Ralei, a major character in The Genius Prince's Guide to Raising a Nation Out of Debt. In 2023, he voiced Asahi Ikusaba in My One-Hit Kill Sister, Polka Shinoyama in Dead Mount Death Play, Yako Amano in Ayaka: A Story of Bonds and Wounds, Peter in Bikkuri-Men, and Jyushi Aimono in Hypnosis Mic: Division Rap Battle: Rhyme Anima. In 2024, he starred as Yūya in A Condition Called Love and Juri in Vampire Dormitory.

In October 2023, he was a guest at Okayama Momo Anime Fes in Okayama, Okayama Prefecture, where he had a talk show and "with his native prefecture's encouragement, renewed his resolve". He won the Best New Actor Award at the 18th Seiyu Awards.

He is also a fan of Ling Tosite Sigure, singing their lead vocalist Toru Kitajima's song "Hikari no Akuma" as part of Epsilon Phi.

== Filmography ==
=== Animated television ===
Year	Title	Role	Ref.
2019	Pikachin-Kit	Bachman I	
2020	Argonavis from BanG Dream!	Shu Ujigawa	
2020	Moriarty the Patriot	Boy	
2020	Yu-Gi-Oh! Sevens	Student, Kan Hakubutsu	
2022	Shadowverse Flame	Mikado Shirogane	
2022	The Genius Prince's Guide to Raising a Nation Out of Debt	Nanaki Ralei	
2023	Dead Mount Death Play	Polka Shinoyama	
2023	My One-Hit Kill Sister	Asahi Ikusaba	
2023	Ayaka: A Story of Bonds and Wounds	Yako Amano	
2023	Bikkuri-Men	Peter	
2023	Hypnosis Mic: Division Rap Battle: Rhyme Anima	Jyushi Aimono	
2023	The 100 Girlfriends Who Really, Really, Really, Really, Really Love You	Yuu-kun	
2024	Vampire Dormitory	Juri	
2024	Dungeon People	Ratta	
2024	A Terrified Teacher at Ghoul School!	Tamao Akisame	
2025	Secrets of the Silent Witch	Neil Clay Maywood	
2025	Dr. Stone	Joel Gear	
2026	The Case Book of Arne	Zisye	
2026	Champignon Witch	Lize	
2026	Jujutsu Kaisen	Kirara Hoshi	
2026	Go for It, Nakamura!	Aiki Hirose	
2026	Recommendations from Iwamoto-senpai	Kai Haramachi	
2026	Let's Go Kaikigumi	Doppelganger	
2026	Keroro☆	Fuyuki Hinata	
2027	Multi-Mind Mayhem	Franko	

=== Animated film ===
Year	Title	Role	Ref.
2024	Kuramerukagari	Yūya	

=== Original net animation ===
Year	Title	Role	Ref.
2020	Bakugan: Armored Alliance	Chinese brawler, Chao	

=== Video games ===
Year	Title	Role	Ref.
2018	Monster Strike		
2019	Readyyy!	Uta Kamijō	
2020	Hypnosis Mic: Alternative Rap Battle	Jyushi Aimono	
2020	Show by Rock!! Fes A Live	Roroi	
2020	The King of Fighters for Girls	Chris	
2021	Argonavis from BanG Dream! Aaside	Shu Ujigawa	
2021	Monark	Shin'ya Yumida	
2024	Ensemble Stars!!	Kanna Natsu	
2024	Beyblade X: Xone	Protagonist (Male)	
2024	18TRIP	Toi Shiramitsu	
2025	Kemono Teatime	Blintz	

=== Dubbing ===
- Jurassic World (2025 The Cinema edition) (Gray Mitchell (Ty Simpkins))

== Awards ==
Year	Award	Result	Ref.
2024	Seiyu Award for Best New Actor	Won	
