= Arata Shindo =

- Psycho-Pass character
- Arata Shindo as seen in Psycho-Pass official website
- First appearance: Psycho-Pass 3 Episode 1: "Laelaps' Calling"
- Created by: Tow Ubukata, Makoto Fukami, Ryo Yoshigami
- Designed by: Akira Amano
- Voiced by: Yūki Kaji (Japanese); Dallas Reid (English)

Arata Shindo (Japanese: 慎導灼, Hepburn: Shindō Arata) is a protagonist from Production I.G's 2019 anime television series Psycho-Pass 3. Shindo is a new Inspector working for Division 1 alongside his best friend, Kei Mikhail Ignatov. Shindo and Ignatov are in charge of their Enforcers who assist and protect them. Shindo often analyzes the situations he finds himself in using his mentalist skills known as a Mental Trace. Throughout the series, Shindo's team learns of a criminal organization called Bifrost. As the series explores varied encounters, Bifrost's influence becomes apparent with the outcome of Shindo's and Ignatov's investigation resolved in the 2020 anime film, Psycho-Pass 3 First Inspector, which was released for a theater run in Japan, followed by streaming release world-wide, in March, 2020.

The character originated from director Naoyoshi Shiotani's desire to develop a new cast for the sequel to the previous Psycho-Pass series. Shindo was written by Tow Ubukata, Makoto Fukami and Ryo Yoshigami, all of whom wanted Shindo and Ignatov to be close friends despite their differences. Shindo's characterization caused the development team difficulties because he was intended to be portrayed as a likable character due to his importance as a highly skilled detective. He was voiced by Yūki Kaji in Japanese and by Dallas Reid in English. Yūki Kaji enjoyed the work due to the character's actions and relationships explored in the narrative.

Critical reception to Shindo has been positive. Despite him not being written by the series' first writer, Gen Urobuchi, he fit well within the cast thanks to his mental skills and further characterization. His relationship with Ignatov also received positive responses.

== Creation and development ==
During the making of the series, director Naoyoshi Shiotani entrusted the writers Tow Ubukata, Makoto Fukami and Ryo Yoshigami with handling a new cast. Fukami was surprised that despite the new story and cast, the series still felt like Psycho-Pass. They believed that the underlying close relationship between Shindo and Ignatov with Bifrost would engage the audience. Shiotani and the producers also discussed the idea of a "Total Character Change" saying, "think of them as two good buddies" despite outwardly differing personalities and physical appearance. Ubukata presents Shindo shorter than Ignatov and has them being of different national origins. Ubukata also presents the concept of "psychology vs. combat," making Shindo a mentalist while Ignatov is a former soldier trained in martial arts. And while Shindo's cheerfulness may strike one as naïve compared to Ignatov's stoic nature, he is discovered to be a keen sleuth as the series unfolds. While previous duos featured as the leads from the Psycho-Pass series had different genders, Shindo and Ignatov were the first ones to have the share the same. Shiotani said there was no meaning behind as the series was inspired by Japanese police dramas which tend to have multiple types of duos. Shiotani wanted Shindo to look like a weak person in contrast to returning and new Psycho-Pass most notably due to his low height.

Ubukata insisted that Shindo and Ignatov be written by Fukami, who said early in the making of the series that Ubakata did not like Shindo. Ubukata also said that Shindo appears to be a good detective because he understands the criminal mind. Fukami also found Shindo a difficult character to write because of his aura of mystery and use of trickery to obtain results. Yoshigami found the character appealing because he was a humanizing factor within the cast, comparing him to "a con artist," but in a police-like sense. Like all Psycho-Pass characters, Shindo was designed by mangaka Akira Amano, who drew an illustration of him, Ignatov and fellow character Azusawa Koichi for the final episode of Psycho-Pass 3.

=== Voice actor ===
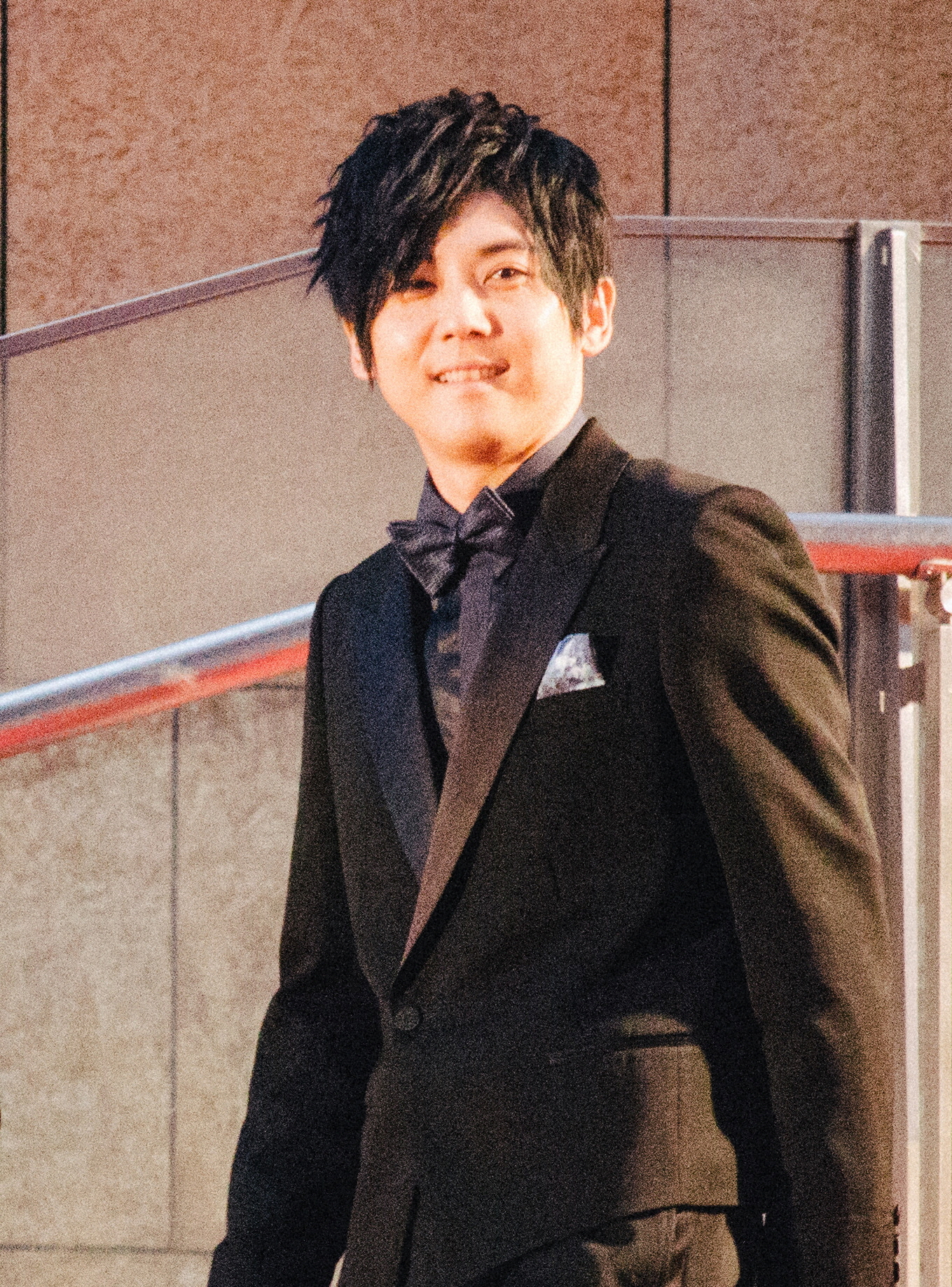
Yūki Kaji voices Arata Shindo.

Yūki Kaji voiced Shindo in the series. Upon seeing his character for the first time, Kaji found him stylish. Kaji was overjoyed when he got the role of Shindo during the audition, having watched the previous Psycho-Pass works and being a fan of them. Kaji enjoyed the character's relationship with Ignatov due to their close relationship and Shindo's style of interacting with the characters from previous seasons. Kaji laughed when first reading the script because he found the cast unique and looked forward to the characters' growth during the series. He had mixed feelings about Shindo wielding the Dominator due to the violence it can cause.

Upon the release of the film First Inspector, Kaji said that his impression of Arata is that he is a man who believes in the potential of humans and noted he cares for his teammates, the Reinforcers as seen through his actions across the anime. He was satisfied with the cast he worked with and claims he was interested in the character of Kariya who is one of the main focus on the movie. Shiotani claimed that Kaji's work as Shindo was remarkably good. However, he was afraid by the amount of lines he had to say in comparison to the other members from the cast.

Ignatov's voice actor, Yūichi Nakamura, also enjoyed the dynamic between Shindo and his character and wished the two were brothers. The handling of the characters' relationships with their underlings also appealed to him. Nakamura had no clear understanding of Shindo and Ignatov because their pasts are not explored in the early episodes and he looked forward to the development of the series.

== Appearances ==
Shindo is introduced as one of two main protagonists of Psycho-Pass 3, which is set in a dystopian future and focuses on the use of the Sibyl System, a hive mind that uses public psychometric scanners that calculate the likelihood of a person committing a crime, resulting in a Crime Coefficient. Shindo is an Inspector for the Public Safety Bureau who investigates crime scenes and pursues individuals with high Crime Coefficient readings while controlling a hand-held weapon called a Dominator that is capable of stunning or destroying a target depending upon Sibyl's judgment.

Shindo is a mentalist who has an ability called a Mental Trace (メンタルトレース) that allows him to cross mental boundaries. He is also empathic and skilled in tracking his targets and understanding their states of mind. His use of this skill puts him at physical risk and causes him to hallucinate the image of a man with the head of a fox. It is later revealed he is also "Criminally Asymptomatic," making it difficult for the Sibyl System to judge him because his Psycho-Pass is either low or non-existent.

Shindo becomes an Inspector together with his childhood friend and fellow rookie Inspector, Kei Mikhail Ignatov. They have a strong bond and were the victims of a case that claimed the lives of Shindo's father and Ignatov's brother. In Psycho-Pass 3, Shindo and Ignatov serve under Chief Mika Shimotsuki who tends to be irritated by the duo's reckless actions, but allows them to proceed. The duo investigates crime scenes and focuses on a criminal organization known as Bifrost. Across the third season and sequel film, Shindo becomes the bodyguard of Tokyo governor, Karina Komiya. In the 2020 film, Psycho-Pass 3: First Inspector, Shindo is kidnapped by terrorist Koichi Azusawa from Bifrost. With the help of Shion Karanomori and Komiya, he is released and continues to fight Bifrost's forces alongside his allies from Unit One. Along the way he learns that his father, Atsushi Shindo, is a member of the collective minds that comprise the Sibyl System and that Atsushi had his son's memories sealed off in order to allow the boy to grow up and to remain an individual. Shindo arrests Azusawa and is allowed to remain an Inspector and an individual with free will.

== Reception ==
Critical response to Shindo has been positive. Ninotaku found him to be a well-developed character because he fits with the other characters created by Gen Urobuchi, especially Akane Tsunemori. Sequential Planet said the use of new protagonists was a risky movement for the franchise due to the popularity of Kogami and Tsunemori. Nevertheless, the site further stated that both Shindo and Ignatov are likeable characters, enjoying the former more for his cheerful personality, which contrasts with the series' dark narrative. Due to the focus the duo is given, the reviewer said Shindo and Ignatov are successors to Shinya Kogami. TheCinemaHolic wondered about Shindo's mentalist skills, saying although it might appear to be less realistic than the deductive skills employed by previous protagonists, it had the potential to be executed in a positive fashion in later episodes. Due to his portrayal, Shindo was compared to Steven Moffat's and Mark Gatiss's portrayals of Sherlock Holmes in the 2010s television series.

TheCinemaHolic praised Shindo's and Igantov's roles in later episodes for the way they fit with the supporting characters. Shindo was also praised by Anime News Network for the way his mentalist skills added a new element to investigations and the air of mystery it gave to the new series. The same site noted that as more information about the two lead characters was revealed, the more their fate became chaotic, citing Shindo's hallucinations and the hidden aspects of his father's death. The focus given to Shindo and Ignatov in the finale also earned positive responses for the uncertainty created regarding whether or not they would betray their values. TheCinemaHolic stated that Shindo's Mental Trace added depth to his character though he might come across as ambiguous when analyzed and that he, too, underwent a notable character arc, becoming more mature with potential for further development. In a further analysis of the finale's narrative, the site agreed with Anime News Network regarding the handling of the duo in saying Ignatov was the more explored character of the pair because of the likely outcome of his final decision and its effect on his colleagues, especially Shindo. Comic Book Resources praised traits given to Shindo that make him an appealing character, comparable to the ones of Kogami and Tsunemori but at the same time unique, noting his Mental Trace. In preparation for First Inspector, the website looked forward to how Shindo's most prominent bonds will be explored such as his connection with Tsunemori, Atsushi, Kei and Karima.

In regards to his role in First Inspector, Biggest in Japan praised the handling of Arata during the climax when he is judged by the Sybil System due to the parallels with Tsunemori and Shimotsuki in the past with Arata instead being judged as an equal while also praising his characterization for being close to the viewer as a result of being one of the few characters close to the audience when it comes to his conflict with Azusawa. Anime News Network also praised the interactions between Arata and Azusawa as rather than fighting physically, they both instead act accordingly to their morals. Fimona found that Shindo and Ignatov are the ones most focused on as they are the ones who had most of their character arcs to be properly developed. He also appreciated how Shion Kanamori also has proper screentime after several story arcs where she lacked focus.

== Merchandise ==
Shindo's image is being used to produce clothing by the suit brand Difference, which is produced by Konaka Co.
