= Dallas Reid =

American voice actor (born 1993)

- Born: April 5, 1993 (age 33)
- Occupations: Voice actor; ADR director; ADR script writer
- Years active: 2013–present
- Notable credits: Shomin Sample as Kimito Kagurazaka; Black Clover as Asta; Psycho-Pass as Arata Shindo; Cheer Boys!! as Haruki Bando; Hyouka as Satoshi Fukube; Angels of Death as Isaac Foster / Zack
- Spouse: Jill Harris (m. 2019; div. 2025)

Dallas Reid (born April 5, 1993) is an American voice actor. Their first lead role was in 2015 as Kimito Kagurazaka in Shomin Sample. They're best known for voicing Asta in Black Clover, Arata Shindo in Psycho-Pass, and Isaac Foster / Zack in Angels of Death.

== Filmography ==
=== Anime ===
List of voice performances in anime
Year	Title	Role	Notes	Source
2013	Aesthetica of a Rogue Hero	Ryohei Uesaki	Debut anime role	
2015	Tokyo Ghoul	Kuramoto Ito		
2015	Shomin Sample	Kimito Kagurazaka	Debut anime lead role	
2015	Noragami Aragoto	Suzuha		
2016	And You Thought There Is Never a Girl Online?	Hideki Nishimura / Russian		
2016	First Love Monster	Kazuo "Kaz" Noguchi		
2016	Handa-kun	Yukio Kondo		
2016	Cheer Boys!!	Haruki Bando		
2016	Hetalia: The World Twinkle	Republic of Niko-Niko, Davie		
2016	Joker Game	Hatano		
2016	Nanbaka	Seitarou Tanabata		
2016	All Out!!	Suwa		
2016	Touken Ranbu: Hanamaru series	Yamatonokami Yasusada		
2017	Akashic Records of Bastard Magic Instructor	Alf	Ep. 4	
2017	Sakura Quest	Yamada		
2017	My Hero Academia	Juzo Honenuki, Nirengeki Shoda		
2017	The Royal Tutor	Max	Ep. 1	
2017	Tsugumomo	Nakajima	Ep. 5	
2017	Clockwork Planet	Naoto Miura		
2017	Gosick	Ian Musgrave	Eps. 13 & 15	
2017	Hyouka	Satoshi Fukube		
2017	Classroom of the Elite	Yosuke Hirata		
2017	Dragon Ball Super	Liquiir		
2017	Tsuredure Children	Jun Furuya	Assistant ADR Director	
2017	ACCA: 13-Territory Inspection Dept.	Canarii		
2017	King's Game The Animation	Daisuke Tasaki		
2017	Black Clover	Asta		
2017	Star Blazers: Space Battleship Yamato 2199	Tetsuya Kitano		
2018	Hakata Tonkotsu Ramens	Shinohara		
2018	Kakuriyo: Bed and Breakfast for Spirits	Hideyoshi		
2018	Garo: Vanishing Line	George	Ep. 12	
2018	Angels of Death	Isaac Foster / Zack		
2018	Lord of Vermilion: The Crimson King	Ikurō Owari		
2018	Goblin Slayer	Male Elf 2		
2019	Boogiepop and Others	Tanaka, Additional Voices	7 episodes	
2019	Kono Oto Tomare! Sounds of Life	Tsuda		
2019	Nichijou	Makoto Sakurai		
2019	Arifureta: From Commonplace to World's Strongest	Will Cudeta		
2019	Ensemble Stars!	Hiyori		
2019	Mix	Tadashi (Imakawa)		
2019	Stand My Heroes	Natsuki Sugano		
2020	A3! Season Spring and Summer	Haruto		
2021	Attack on Titan	Panzer Unit		
2021	The Day I Became a God	Hiroto Suzuki		
2021	Megalobox 2: Nomad	Bonjiri (older)		
2021	SSSS.Dynazenon	Yomogi		
2021	The Dungeon of Black Company		ADR Director	
2022	The Genius Prince's Guide to Raising a Nation Out of Debt	Wein Salema Arbalest		
2022	Heroines Run the Show	Kotaro	Assistant ADR Director	
2022	Tsukimichi: Moonlit Fantasy	Makoto		
2022	Spy × Family	Yuri Briar		
2022	Sing "Yesterday" for Me	Rou Hayakawa		
2023	Ayaka: A Story of Bonds and Wounds	Yukito Yanagi		
2023	The Ice Guy and His Cool Female Colleague	Katori-kun		
2024	Wind Breaker	Hayato Suō		
2024	Delico's Nursery	Keith		
2024	Quality Assurance in Another World	Yamanaka		
2024	Demon Lord, Retry! R	XX		
2025	The Shiunji Family Children	Shion		
2025	The Water Magician	Ryō		
2026	Hana-Kimi	Nakatsu		

=== Films ===
List of voice performances in films
Year	Title	Role	Notes	Source
2017	One Piece Film: Gold	Gild Tesoro (young)		
2022	One Piece Film: Red	Hanagasa		
2023	Black Clover: Sword of the Wizard King	Asta		
2023	Psycho-Pass Providence	Arata Shindo		
2024	Spy × Family Code: White	Yuri Briar		

=== Video games ===
List of voice performances in video games
Year	Title	Role	Notes	Source
2019	Borderlands 3	NOG, Silvan, Skrit		
