= Hinata Takeda =

Japanese manga artist

- 武田 日向
- Born: August 11, 1978
- Died: January 2017 (aged 38)
- Occupation: Manga artist
- Notable work: Yaeka no Karute; Croisée in a Foreign Labyrinth; Gosick

Hinata Takeda (武田 日向, Takeda Hinata; August 11, 1978 –January 2017) was a Japanese manga artist. Her notable works include Yaeka no Karute, Croisée in a Foreign Labyrinth, and Gosick.

Takeda has a sister named Enaga Senno, who is an illustrator and is four years younger.

In January 2017, she died due to illness. It was made public by the entry by Kazuki Sakuraba, author of Dragon Age released on 9 May of the same year, June 2017 issue of the same day and Gosick on the same day.

== Works ==
Date	Title	Publisher	Issue	Code
Apr 2002	Yaeka no Karute	Kadokawa Dragon Comics		ISBN 4049261960
Mar 2003	Yaeka no Karute	Kadokawa Dragon Comics		ISBN 4049262193
Feb 2004	Yaeka no Karute	Kadokawa Dragon Comics		ISBN 4049262436
	Kitsune to Atori ―Hinata Takeda Tanhenshū- "Kitsune to Atori"			ISBN 4047125008
	Kitsune to Atori ―Hinata Takeda Tanhenshū- "Dolls Girl"			ISBN 4047125008
	Kitsune to Atori ―Hinata Takeda Tanhenshū- "Yaeka no Karute Bangai-hen o Shūroku"			ISBN 4047125008
Dec 2007	Croisée in a Foreign Labyrinth	Kadokawa Comics Dragon Jr.		ISBN 4047125229
Jun 2009	Croisée in a Foreign Labyrinth	Kadokawa Comics Dragon Jr.		ISBN 4047126098
	Yūdachi Pool	Dengeki Daioh	Oct 2006	

=== Illustrations ===
Title	Author	Publisher	Code	Notes
TCG Monster Collection				
Gosick	Kazuki Sakuraba	Fujimi Mystery Bunko, Kadokawa Beans Bunko	ISBN 4829162295 / ISBN 9784044281168	
Gosick Sono Tsumi wa Na mo Naki	Kazuki Sakuraba	Fujimi Mystery Bunko, Kadokawa Beans Bunko	ISBN 4829162546 / ISBN 9784044281175	
Gosick Aoi Bara no Shita de	Kazuki Sakuraba	Fujimi Mystery Bunko, Kadokawa Beans Bunko	ISBN 4829162732 / ISBN 9784044281182	
Gosick Gusha o Daiben seyo	Kazuki Sakuraba	Fujimi Mystery Bunko, Kadokawa Beans Bunko	ISBN 4829162880 / ISBN 9784044281229	
Gosick Beelzebub no Tōgai	Kazuki Sakuraba	Fujimi Mystery Bunko, Kadokawa Beans Bunko	ISBN 4829163283 / ISBN 9784044281250	
Gosick Kamenbudōkai no Yoru	Kazuki Sakuraba	Fujimi Mystery Bunko, Kadokawa Beans Bunko	ISBN 4829163755 / ISBN 9784044281267	
Gosicks Haru Kitaru Shinigami	Kazuki Sakuraba	Fujimi Mystery Bunko, Kadokawa Beans Bunko	ISBN 4829163100 / ISBN 9784044281205	
Gosicks Natsu kara Tōzakaru Ressha	Kazuki Sakuraba	Fujimi Mystery Bunko, Kadokawa Beans Bunko	ISBN 4829163526 / ISBN 9784044281236	
Gosicks Aki no Hana no Omoide	Kazuki Sakuraba	Fujimi Mystery Bunko, Kadokawa Beans Bunko	ISBN 4829163879 / ISBN 9784041000489	
Amnesia Labyrinth	Nagaru Tanigawa, Koba Naju/drawings	Dengeki Comics		Character draft
Croisée in a Foreign Labyrinth Le cahier d'Yune	Hinata Takeda, Mari Hagihara, Mariko Ito/drawings	Fujimi Fantasia Collection		

=== Drama CD ===
Date	Title	Publisher
Aug 2004	Yaeka no Karute	Frontier Works
