= Ian Sinclair (voice actor) =

American voice actor (born 1984)

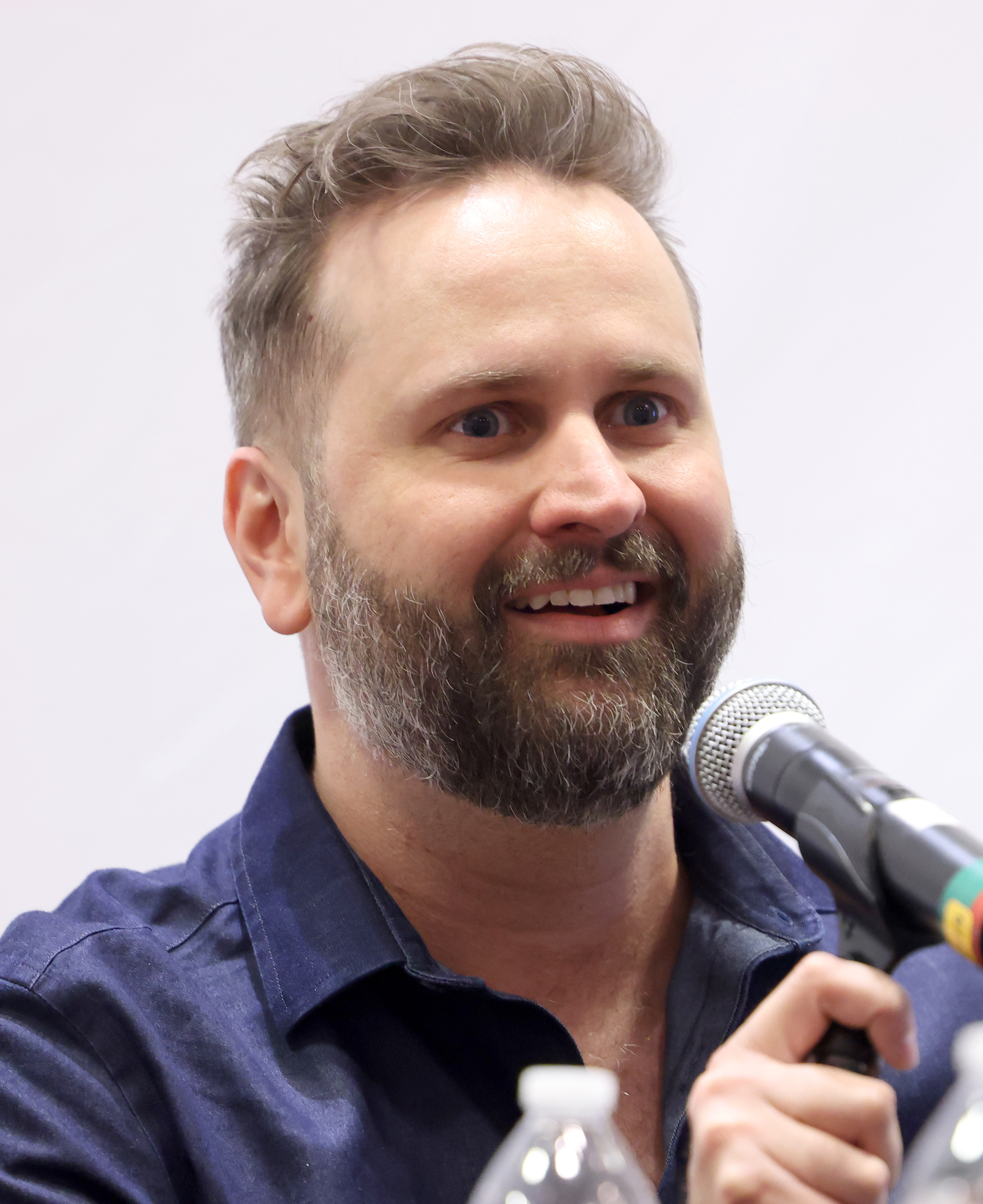
- Sinclair in 2025
- Born: March 2, 1984 (age 42); Dallas, Texas, U.S.
- Other name: Mark Graham
- Occupations: Voice actor; voice director
- Years active: 2004–present
- Agent: Mary Collins Agency

Ian Sinclair (born March 2, 1984) is an American voice actor and voice director. He provides voices for English versions of Japanese anime series and video games. Some of his major roles include Toraji Ishida in Bamboo Blade; Dallas Genoard in Baccano!; Koichi Azusawa in Psycho-Pass; Douglas Rosenberg in El Cazador de la Bruja; Takeru Oyama in Maken-ki!; Brook and Scopper Gaban in the Funimation dub of One Piece; Juzo Sakakura in the Danganronpa series; Whis in Dragon Ball Super, The narrator in Kaguya-sama: Love Is War, and the title characters in Toriko and Space Dandy. In addition he performs the voice in video games the likes of Battleborn, Zaveid in Tales of Zestiria, Baron Flynt in Borderlands, Professor Nakayama and Jimbo Hodunk in Borderlands 2, and Berkut in Fire Emblem Echoes: Shadows of Valentia. Sinclair was in the English dub cast as Yasuda in Shin Godzilla.

== Biography ==
Sinclair was born in Dallas, Texas, U.S.A. on March 2, 1984. He is half-Canadian. Sinclair has been voice acting since he was studying theatre in college. After that, he had been working as an actor in Dallas, and occasionally in Los Angeles. Sinclair has also directed Spice and Wolf II, Black Butler I & II, Initial D, and Shana movie.

== Filmography ==
=== Film ===
List of voice performances in films
Year	Title	Role	Notes	Source
2013	One Piece Film: Strong World	Brook	English dub	
2014	Dragon Ball Z: Battle of Gods	Whis	English dub	
2014	One Piece Film: Z	Brook	English dub	
2015	Dragon Ball Z: Resurrection 'F'	Whis	English dub	
2016	The Boy and the Beast	Tatara	English dub	
2017	One Piece Film: Gold	Brook	English dub	
2018	My Hero Academia: Two Heroes	Mezo Shoji	English dub	
2018	Dragon Ball Super: Broly	Whis	English dub	
2019	One Piece: Stampede	Brook	English dub	
2020	My Hero Academia: Heroes Rising	Mezo Shoji	English dub	
2020	Jiang Ziya	Shen Gongbao	English dub	
2021	My Hero Academia: World Heroes' Mission	Mezo Shoji	English dub	
2022	Sing a Bit of Harmony	Gotchan	English dub	
2022	Dragon Ball Super: Super Hero	Whis	English dub	
2022	One Piece Film: Red	Brook	English dub	
2023	Black Clover: Sword of the Wizard King	Magna Swing	English dub	
2024	My Hero Academia: You're Next	Mezo Shoji	English dub	

=== Anime ===
List of voice performances in anime
Year	Title	Role	Notes	Source
2007	Bamboo Blade	Toraji Ishida		
2007	Claymore	Zaki		
2007	El Cazador de la Bruja	Douglas Rosenberg, Stephen		
2008	Black Butler series	Baldroy	ADR director	
2008	Casshern Sins	Akoz	Ep. 3	
2008	Rin: Daughters of Mnemosyne	Shogo Shimazaki		
2009	Baccano!	Dallas Genoard		
2009	Fairy Tail	Bora, Kawazu		
2009	Fullmetal Alchemist: Brotherhood	Liam		
2009–present	Hetalia: Axis Powers series	Romano		
2010	Baka and Test series	Hasegawa		
2010	Oh! Edo Rocket	Toyama		
2010	Sekirei series	Kaoru Seo		
2010	The Legend of the Legendary Heroes	Ryner Lute		
2010	Initial D: Fourth Stage	Daiki Ninomiya	ADR director, Funimation dub	
2011	Fractale	Takamy		
2011	Future Diary	Yomotsu Hirasaka (12th)		
2011	Last Exile: Fam, the Silver Wing	Ōrang		
2011	Level E	Colin		
2011	Maken-ki! series	Takeru Oyama		
2011	Princess Jellyfish	Shu Koibuchi		
2011	Rosario + Vampire series	Ginei Morioka		
2011	Spice and Wolf II	Marc Cole	ADR director	
2012	Appleseed XIII	Alcides		
2012	B Gata H Kei: Yamada's First Time	Daisuke Matsuo		
2012	Ōkami-san and her Seven Companions	Shirō Hitsujikai		
2012	Panty & Stocking with Garterbelt	Chuck		
2012	Shiki	Tatsumi		
2012	Toriko	Toriko		
2013	Aquarion Evol	Malloy		
2013	Free! – Eternal Summer	Sosuke Yamazaki		
2013	Karneval	Hirato		
2013	Red Data Girl	Okochi		
2013	Shakugan no Shana series	Eita Tanaka	ADR director for movie	
2013–present	One Piece	Brook, Gaban, Ryuma, Toriko (Ep. 590), Additional Voices	Funimation dub	
2014	Robotics;Notes	Genki Doto		
2014–2022	Attack on Titan	Nile Dok	Also Attack on Titan: Junior High	
2014	Ben-To	Ren Nikaidō		
2014	D-Frag!	Hiroshi Nagayama		
2014	Jormungand series	Renato "R" Socci		
2014	Kamisama Kiss series	Otohiko		
2014	Psycho-Pass	Nobuo Okura	Ep. 1	
2014	Space Dandy	Dandy		
2015	Assassination Classroom	The Reaper		
2015	Blood Blockade Battlefront	Zapp Renfro		
2015	Death Parade	Yosuke Tateishi	Ep. 4	
2015	Gangsta	Worick Arcangelo		
2015	Noragami series	Daikoku		
2015	Nobunagun	John Hunter		
2015	Ping Pong: The Animation	Masayuki Sanada		
2015	Seraph of the End	Shiho Kimizuki		
2015	Show by Rock!! series	Yaiba		
2015	Soul Eater Not!	Akane Hoshi		
2015	Tokyo Ghoul series	Kazuichi Banjō		
2015	Tokyo Ravens	Touji Ato		
2015	Unbreakable Machine-Doll	Felix Kingsfort		
2015	Yona of the Dawn	Kija		
2015	The Heroic Legend of Arslan	Rajendra		
2015–2022	Overlord	Cocco Doll, additional voices	6 episodes	
2016	Snow White with the Red Hair	Mitsuhide Lowen		
2016	Tales of Zestiria the X	Zaveid		
2016	Terror in Resonance	Hamura		
2016	Lord Marksman and Vanadis	Gerard Augre		
2016	Rage of Bahamut: Genesis	Favaro Leone		
2016	Prince of Stride: Alternative	Kei Kamoda		
2016	The Vision of Escaflowne	Gaddes	Funimation dub	
2016	Dimension W	Salva-Enna-Tibesti		
2016	Gonna be the Twin-Tail!!	Fleaguildy	Ep. 10	
2016	Endride	Emilio Langheim		
2016	Handa-kun	Noboru Moriyamada	Ep. 1	
2016	Cheer Boys!!	Jin Dōmoto		
2016	First Love Monster	Atsushi Taga		
2016	And You Thought There Is Never a Girl Online?	Ron	Ep. 8	
2016	Puzzle & Dragons X	Nyudo		
2016	Danganronpa 3: The End of Hope's Peak High School series	Juzo Sakakura		
2016	D.Gray-man Hallow	Yu Kanda		
2016	Servamp	Lawless		
2016	Aquarion Logos	Tanaka		
2016	Tōken Ranbu: Hanamaru	Hachisuka Kotetsu		
2016	Drifters	Hijikata Toshizō		
2016	Nanbaka	Hajime Sugoroku		
2016	Sengoku Basara: End of Judgement	Sakai Tadatsugu		
2016	All Out!!	Etsugo Ōharano		
2016	Yuri!!! on Ice	Celestino Cialdini		
2016	Keijo!!!!!!!!	Jun Sasaki		
2016–2025	My Hero Academia	Mezō Shōji		
2017	ACCA: 13-Territory Inspection Dept.	Grossular		
2017	Fūka	Nobuaki Yahagi	Eps. 3–4	
2017	Chain Chronicle: The Light of Haecceitas	Einslot		
2017	Gosick	Maxim	Ep. 4	
2017	Saga of Tanya the Evil	Pierre Michel de Lugo		
2017	Akiba's Trip: The Animation	Taiyō Tenkawa	Ep. 12	
2017	Tsukigakirei	Daisuke Tachibana		
2017	The Silver Guardian	Ling		
2017	Samurai Warriors	Naoe Kanetsugu		
2017	Gosick	Maxime	Ep. 4	
2017	Akashic Records of Bastard Magic Instructor	Leos Kleitos		
2017	Code Geass: Akito the Exiled	Claus Warwick		
2017	Hyōka	Masashi Tōgaito		
2017	Ushio and Tora	Nagare Akiba, Gurashi		
2017	Saiyuki Reload Blast	Sha Gojyo		
2017	Convenience Store Boy Friends	Makoto Sakamoto		
2017	Genocidal Organ	Williams		
2017	Space Patrol Luluco	Guts	Ep. 7	
2017	Jūni Taisen: Zodiac War	Eiji Kashii/Ox		
2017	Dies Irae	Valeria Trifa		
2017	Recovery of an MMO Junkie	Homare Koiwai		
2017	Code: Realize − Guardian of Rebirth	Abraham Van Helsing		
2017	Black Clover	Magna Swing		
2017	Taboo Tattoo	Karam	Ep. 6	
2017	Hundred	Judal Harvey		
2017	Myriad Colors Phantom World	Albrecht	Ep. 6	
2017–2019	Dragon Ball Super	Whis		
2018	Ace Attorney	Luke Atmey	Season 2, Ep. 1-5	
2018	Pop Team Epic	Pipimi (Ep. 1A, Bob Epic Team segments), Tōru Adachi (Team AC) (Ep. 7)		
2018	Hakata Tonkotsu Ramens	Shotaro Harada		
2018	Junji Ito Collection	Jack the Ripper	Ep. 7b	
2018	Nomad of Nowhere	Ranch Hand	Eps. 2–3	
2018	Golden Kamuy	Saichi Sugimoto		
2018	The Legend of the Galactic Heroes: Die Neue These	Yang Wen-Li		
2018	Haikyu!!	Kōtaro Bokuto	Season 2	
2018–2024	The Slime Diaries: That Time I Got Reincarnated as a Slime	Soei		
2019	The Morose Mononokean II	Executive		
2019	RobiHachi	Yang		
2019	Sarazanmai	Reo Niiboshi		
2019	How Heavy Are the Dumbbells You Lift?	Narrator		
2019	African Office Worker	Lizard		
2019	Case File nº221: Kabukicho	Sherlock Holmes		
2019	Meiji Tokyo Renka	Charlie		
2019	Radiant	Von Tepes		
2019–2025	Fire Force	Viktor Licht		
2019–2026	Dr. Stone	Tsukasa Shishio		
2020	Toilet-Bound Hanako-kun	Tsuchigomori		
2020	Food Wars!: Shokugeki no Soma	Azami Nakiri (née Nakamura)	Season 3	
2020	Deca-Dence	Sarkozy	2020	
2020	Fruits Basket	Kureno Soma	2019 reboot; Season 2	
2020	Wonder Egg Priority	Uru-acca		
2020	Infinite Dendrogram	Mr. Franklin		
2020	Plunderer	Genji Akui	Eps. 12–18	
2020–2023	Kaguya-sama: Love Is War	Narrator		
2021	Wonder Egg Priority	Ura-Acca		
2021	Sakura Wars the Animation	Seijuro Kamiyama		
2021	The Saint's Magic Power is Omnipotent	Albert Hawke		
2021	The Prince of Tennis II: Hyotei vs. Rikkai Game of Future	Genichiro Sanada		
2021	Magatsu Wahrheit Zuerst	Helman		
2021	The Case Study of Vanitas	Dante		
2021	The Dungeon of Black Company	Saruyama		
2021	The Vampire Dies in No Time	Ronaldo		
2022	World Trigger	Gatlin		
2022	Requiem of the Rose King	Catesby		
2022	Mobile Suit Gundam SEED Destiny	Lord Djibril	Remastered version	
2022	The Prince of Tennis	Gen'ichiro Sanada		
2022	Trapped in a Dating Sim: The World of Otome Games Is Tough for Mobs	Jilk		
2022	Ya Boy Kongming!	Narrator		
2022	Shinobi no Ittoki	Tokisada Kaga		
2022	The Girl from the Other Side: Siúil, a Rún	Outsider		
2022	Skeleton Knight in Another World	Fumba Soodu Rozombanya		
2022–2023	Mobile Suit Gundam: The Witch from Mercury	Rajan	6 episodes	
2023	Vinland Saga	Einar	Crunchyroll dub	
2023	Why Raeliana Ended Up at the Duke's Mansion	Noah		
2023	Hell's Paradise	Gui Fa (Yang) , Ju Fa (Yang), Mu Dan (Yang), Ran (Yang), Rien (Yang), Tao Fa (Yang), Zhu Jin (Yang)	All Male Versions of Tensen	
2023	Reign of the Seven Spellblades	Darius Grenville		
2024	Laid-Back Camp	Clerk		
2024	Demon Lord 2099	Veltol Velvet Velsvalt		
2024	You Are Ms. Servant	Arata Yokoya		
2024	Shangri-La Frontier	Aramis	Season 2	
2024–2025	Solo Leveling	Choi Jong-in		
2025	Failure Frame	Takuto Kirihara		
2025	Yakuza Fiancé: Raise wa Tanin ga Ii	Asebi		
2025	Gachiakuta	Zodyl Typhon		
2025	To Be Hero X	Liu Zhen		
2025	Anne Shirley	Teddy Phillips		
2025	The Unaware Atelier Meister	Danzo		
2026	I Want to End This Love Game	Masaru Shinonome		

=== Animation ===
List of voice performances in animation
Year	Title	Role	Notes	Source
2019	Camp Camp	Cameron Campbell	Episode: "St. Campbell's Day"	

=== Video games ===
List of voice performances in video games
Year	Title	Role	Notes	Source
2009	Borderlands	Baron Flynt		
2011	Dragon Ball Z: Ultimate Tenkaichi	"Cool" custom voice		
2012	Borderlands 2	Professor Nakayama, Jimbo Hodunk		
2014	Dragon Ball Z: Battle of Z	Whis		
2014	Smite	Tyr		
2014	Borderlands: The Pre-Sequel	Professor Nakayama, Herbert Plattz		
2015	Dragon Ball Xenoverse	Whis		
2015	Tales of Zestiria	Zaveid		
2016	Street Fighter V	Rashid		
2016	Battleborn	Montana		
2016	The Legend of Heroes: Trails of Cold Steel II	Toval Randonneur		
2016	Dragon Ball Xenoverse 2	Whis		
2016	Backstage Pass	John Brandon		
2017	Tales of Berseria	Zaveid		
2017	Fire Emblem Heroes	Berkut		
2017	Orcs Must Die! Unchained	Tundra		
2017	Fire Emblem Echoes: Shadows of Valentia	Berkut		
2018	Dragon Ball FighterZ	Whis		
2018	BlazBlue: Cross Tag Battle	Gordeau		
2019	Dragon Ball Legends	Whis		
2019	Borderlands 3	Captain Traunt, Film Buff, Jensen		
2020	Dragon Ball Z: Kakarot	Whis		
2020	The Legend of Heroes: Trails of Cold Steel IV	Toval Randonneur		
2021	Mobile Suit Gundam: Battle Operation 2	Adomin Granzman	Game released in 2018. English dub added in January 28, 2021 patch.	
2023	Fire Emblem Engage	Bunet		
2023	Honkai: Star Rail	Capote		
2023	The Legend of Heroes: Trails into Reverie	Toval Randonneur, Moletto		
2023	Street Fighter 6	Rashid		
2024	Dragon Ball: Sparking! Zero	Whis		
2026	Final Fantasy Resonance	Veritas of the Dark		
