= Dragon Age Pure =

Japanese manga magazine

- Dragon Age Pure vol. 4 cover.
- Categories: Shōnen manga
- Frequency: Bi-monthly
- First issue: January 30, 2006
- Final issue: February 20, 2009
- Company: Fujimi Shobo
- Country: Japan
- Based in: Tokyo
- Language: Japanese
- Website: Official website (archived)

Dragon Age Pure (Japanese: ドラゴンエイジピュア, Hepburn: Doragon Eiji Pyua) was a Japanese shōnen manga magazine published by Fujimi Shobo. It was first released on January 30, 2006, and was initially sold quarterly. Starting with the sale of the fourth volume on April 20, 2007, the magazine was sold bimonthly until its final issue, the fifteenth volume released on February 20, 2009. The magazine was a special edition of its parent magazine Monthly Dragon Age which also publishes light novels along with manga.

== Serialized titles ==
=== Manga ===
- @ Home
- Armored Core: Tower City Blade
- bee-be-beat it!
- Chrome Shelled Regios
- Clannad: Tomoyo Dearest
- Crimson Grave
- Croisée in a Foreign Labyrinth
- Diebuster
- Dolls Girl
- Hime no Namida wa Todomaranai
- Kanon
- Maken-ki!
- Maid o Nerae!
- Mei no Naisho
- Munto
- Nightly Knight
- Orichalcum Reycal
- Otome no Iroha
- Room No.1301
- Seitokai no Ichizon
- Supa Supa
- Tetsunagi Kooni
- Tomoyo After: Dear Shining Memories
- Yūgengaisha Kobold Shiritsutanteisha

=== Light novels ===
- Gakkō Yōkai Kikō Daihachi Kaidan Bashūchū
