= Croisée in a Foreign Labyrinth =

Japanese manga series

- Cover of the first manga volume

異国迷路のクロワーゼ (Ikoku Meiro no Kurowāze)
- Genre: Life in a foreign country
- Manga
- Written by: Hinata Takeda
- Published by: Fujimi Shobo
- Magazine: Dragon Age Pure; Monthly Dragon Age
- Original run: June 29, 2006 – 2011
- Volumes: 2
- Anime television series
- Directed by: Kenji Yasuda
- Written by: Jun'ichi Sato
- Music by: ko-ko-ya
- Studio: Satelight
- Licensed by: NA: Sentai Filmworks
- Original network: AT-X, Chiba TV, Saitama TV, Sun TV, Tokyo MX, TV Aichi, TV Kanagawa
- Original run: July 4, 2011 – September 19, 2011
- Episodes: 12 (+ 1 special)

Croisée in a Foreign Labyrinth (異国迷路のクロワーゼ, Ikoku Meiro no Kurowāze; lit. "The Crossroads of a Foreign Maze"), also titled in French as La Croisée dans un Labyrinthe Étranger, is a Japanese manga series written and illustrated by Hinata Takeda about a young Japanese girl named Yune who finds herself in late-19th century Paris.

The series was serialized in Fujimi Shobo's Dragon Age Pure and Monthly Dragon Age from June 2006, but remained unfinished due to Takeda's death from an unspecified disease in January 2017. An anime television adaptation by Satelight aired in Japan between July and September 2011.

== Plot ==
The story takes place at the end of the 19th century, as Japanese culture gains popularity in the West. A young Japanese girl, Yune, accompanies a French traveller, Oscar Claudel, on his journey back to France, and offers to help at the family's ironwork shop in Paris. Oscar's grandson and shop owner Claude reluctantly accepts to take care of Yune, and we learn how those two, who have so little in common, get to understand each other and live together in the Paris of the 1800s.

== Characters ==
Yune (湯音)
Voiced by: Nao Tōyama
A small Japanese girl who comes to France with Oscar in order to work at the Enseignes du Roy.
Claude Claudel (クロード・クローデル, Kurōdo Kurōderu)
Voiced by: Takashi Kondo
A worker at the Enseignes du Roy and Oscar's grandson. He is generally unfamiliar with Japanese customs and is often confused by some of Yune's mannerisms.
Oscar Claudel (オスカー・クローデル, Osukā Kurōderu)
Voiced by: Hideyuki Tanaka
The owner of Enseignes du Roy and Claude's grandfather who brings Yune home with him to France.
Alice Blanche (アリス・ブランシュ, Arisu Buranshu)
Voiced by: Aoi Yūki
A member of the upper class Blanche family who owns the Galerie du Roy within which Ensignes du Roy is located. She has a fascination with Japanese culture and finds herself particularly attracted to Yune, hoping to one day have her stay at her mansion.
Camille Blanche (カミーユ・ブランシュ, Kamīyu Buranshu)
Voiced by: Sayuri Yahagi
A member of the Blanche family and Alice's older sister. It is implied that she has been in love with Claude since childhood, but due to their class differences they can never be together.

== Media ==
=== Manga ===
The original manga by Hinata Takeda began serialization in Fujimi Shobo's Dragon Age Pure magazine on June 29, 2006, before moving to Monthly Dragon Age from June 9, 2009. Two tankōbon volumes were released between December 8, 2007, and June 9, 2009. The manga remains unfinished due to Takeda's death from an unspecified disease in January 2017.

=== Anime ===
At the end of 2010, Monthly Dragon Age's official website announced that an anime series was underway. The anime series is produced by Satelight and aired in Japan between July 4, 2011, and September 19, 2011. A bonus episode, Episode 4.5, was broadcast on the ShowTime online service on July 29, 2011, and was released on the third Blu-ray and DVD volume released on November 25, 2011. North American licensor Sentai Filmworks simulcast the series on The Anime Network and released it on subtitled DVD in September 2012. The opening theme is "Sekai wa Odoru yo, Kimi to." (世界は踊るよ、君と。, The World Will Dance, With You.) by Youmou to Ohana, while the main ending theme is "Kokokara Hajimaru Monogatari" (ここからはじまる物語, The Story That Begins Here) by Nao Tōyama. The ending theme for episode 4.5 is "Tooku Kimi e" (遠く君へ, To You From Far Away) by Megumi Nakajima, while the ending theme for episode 8 is "Tomorrow's Smile" by A.m.u..

==== Episode list ====
| No. | Title | Original release date |
|---|---|---|
| 1 | "Entrance"; Transliteration: "Iriguchi" (Japanese: 入口 (Entrée)) | July 4, 2011 |
Oscar Claudel, the owner of a metalworks shop in the Gallerie du Roy, returns from an overseas trip to Japan, bringing with him a small Japanese girl named Yune, much to the discomfort of his grandson, Claude. When Yune accidentally breaks a sign Claude was working on, she apologizes by letting him sell one of her kimonos. After doing so, Claude later learns that the kimono was a keepsake from Yune's mother, though Yune objects to Claude attempting to cancel the deal. Claude then makes a promise to Yune that he will try and earn enough money to buy the kimono back for her.
| 2 | "Cheese"; Transliteration: "Chīzu" (Japanese: チーズ (Fromage)) | July 11, 2011 |
Yune tries a French breakfast for the first time, though tries to hide her distaste of cheese. Claude and Yune go shopping together.
| 3 | "Japan Labyrinth"; Transliteration: "Nippon Meikyū" (Japanese: 日本迷宮 (Labyrinthe du japon)) | July 18, 2011 |
As Claude is having trouble coming up with an idea for a sign for a music shop, he finds inspiration after seeing Yune write out a letter to her sister. Meanwhile, Oscar learns that Yune's kimono had been bought by the upper-class Blanche family, the youngest of which, Alice, showing excitement when she hears rumors about Yune.
| 4 | "Water and Lights"; Transliteration: "Mizu Akari" (Japanese: 水明かり (Eau et lumiéres)) | July 25, 2011 |
Alice becomes determined to invite Yune over for tea, but Claude is not so keen on the idea. After Alice keeps pestering them, Yune agrees to go to the Blanche household. Although Alice makes various attempts to get Yune to stay with her, even offering to return her kimono free of charge, Yune declines in order to hold up a promise to make sukiyaki for the Claudels.
| 4.5 | "Concert"; Transliteration: "Ongakukai" (Japanese: 音楽会 (Récital)) | July 29, 2011 |
Yune takes an interest in a bohemian named Anne who knows Japanese songs. Alice also takes an interest and decides to have Anne perform a recital in her garden, inviting Yune to sing along to them. During the concert, Anna plays a song that created by her grandfather which was a gift to her Japanese grandmother, who assumedly taught the song to Yune's sister. As Anne takes her leave, she and Yune make a promise to see each other again.
| 5 | "Lost Child"; Transliteration: "Maigo" (Japanese: 迷子 (Perdus)) | August 1, 2011 |
Yune feels downhearted when she is scorned by Claude for being too friendly towards customers. When a scruffy boy takes advantage of Yune's gullibility and steals a candlestick, she chases after him but loses him. Furthermore, she forgets her way back to the Enseignes du Roy, unable to ask others for help and becoming suspicious towards those who do try to help her. She is eventually found by Claude who takes her back home.
| 6 | "Crinoline"; Transliteration: "Kurinorin" (Japanese: 鳥籠 (クリノリン) (Crinoline)) | August 8, 2011 |
Alice visits the Enseignes du Roy to invite Yune to have her photograph taken. Alice follows Yune's advice on putting on a kimono while Yune tries on one of Alice's dresses. While getting their photo taken, Yune notices Alice's sister, Camille, feeling downhearted, prompting a reaction when mentioning it to Claude.
| 7 | "Skylight"; Transliteration: "Tenmado" (Japanese: 天窓 (Lucarne)) | August 15, 2011 |
Claude scolds Yune for trying to sympathize with the boy from before. Yune soon ends up collapsing from a fever, leading Claude to feel guilty about what he said to her. He goes to see Alice, who sends for a doctor and gives him a recipe for Japanese porridge. He also helps deliver a flower the boy made for Yune.
| 8 | "Nursery"; Transliteration: "Kodomobeya" (Japanese: 子供部屋 (Chambre d'enfant)) | August 22, 2011 |
As Claude drops Yune off at a tea party with Alice, he is brought to see Camille, who he used to play with in his childhood. After talking about their local fairy tales, Alice shows Yune the nursery she grew up in, where Camille decides to give her a dress that belonged to Alice when she told her a fascinating story.
| 9 | "Secret Garden"; Transliteration: "Himitsu" (Japanese: 秘密 (Jardin secret)) | August 29, 2011 |
As Yune and Alice continue to play together, Claude recalls the times he used to play with Camille. Claude almost always came over to the Blanche's garden to play with Camille, but she was unwillingly to leave the confines of the mansion herself. One day, Camille sneaks out of the mansion in order to see Claude, later explaining to him that she didn't want to leave the mansion as it would put him in trouble.
| 10 | "Phantasmagoria"; Transliteration: "Fantazumagorī" (Japanese: 魔術幻燈 (Fantasmagorie)) | September 5, 2011 |
As Claude goes to see one of his late father's old clients about a commission, Yune finds an old slide projector, which Oscar decides to show off to her and Alice. Yune is reminded of the time she used to make shadow puppets with her sister. Afterward, Oscar teaches the girls how to make phenakistoscopes, and one of his friends, Alan, helps him put on a public projector show.
| 11 | "Prayer"; Transliteration: "Inori" (Japanese: 祈り (Prière)) | September 12, 2011 |
Alice invites Yune to come to an exhibition at the Grand Magasin, but Claude is strongly against it for some reason. As a reprise, Claude takes Yune and Oscar to a picnic in the park. After seeing her upset while thinking about home, Claude asks Yune to tell him about her sister, Shione. As Shione was often looked at strangely because of her pale blue eyes, Yune, who was weak at the time, made a prayer that she would only be able to look at her. However, as time went on and Yune became stronger, Shione's grew weak and went blind, which Yune blames herself for to this day. However, Oscar assures her that Yune's words made Shione happy.
| 12 | "Cats on a Roof"; Transliteration: "Yane no Ue no Neko" (Japanese: 屋根の上の猫 (Chats sur un toit)) | September 19, 2011 |
Yune hears about a black cat that ran away from one of the stores. Later, Claude yells at Yune when she touches a pair of gloves with belonged to his late father. When Yune hears a bell, she assumes it to be the cat she heard about and goes to search for it, which causes Claude to worry when he can't find her. As Claude gets help from Alice and the other Galerie shopkeepers, he finds Yune up on the roof of the Galerie. After getting her to safety, Claude tells Yune about his father and agrees to take her to the Grand Magasin at some point. Afterward, Claude returns Yune to the Galerie where everyone is waiting.

== Reception ==
Theron Martin of Anime News Network noted that the series didn't utilize its expansive location as much and found its dramatic moments more forced than touching. But Martin praised the series for Satelight's detailed animation, the teaching of cultural exchange in its episodes and its charming and endearing cast, saying that: "It is a cute, relaxing, and occasionally very funny view, however, one stress-free enough to make a soothing way to wind down a difficult day." Tim Jones of THEM Anime Reviews also criticized the story's forced conflict and lack of new locations but gave praise to the animation and score for capturing 19th century France and Yune's adventures through that period, concluding that: "It's a good series, though its cute heroine and sweet slice-of-life moments are hampered by drama that seems overused more than it should."

== Similar programs ==
- Moero! Top Striker: Same as this work, an animation with the theme of "life in a foreign country". Broadcast in 1991–1992.
- Kin-iro Mosaic: An anime about a British girl who stays in Japan.
