= Maken-ki! =

2011 manga and anime series

- Cover of the first manga volume featuring Inaho Kushiya

マケン姫っ!
- Genre: Action, harem
- Manga
- Written by: Hiromitsu Takeda
- Published by: Fujimi Shobo
- Magazine: Dragon Age Pure (former); Monthly Dragon Age
- Original run: April 20, 2007 – March 9, 2020
- Volumes: 24
- Anime television series
- Directed by: Koichi Ohata
- Produced by: Naoshi Imamoto; Yoshiyuki Matsuzaki
- Written by: Yōsuke Kuroda
- Music by: Cheru Watanabe
- Studio: AIC Spirits
- Licensed by: Crunchyroll
- Original network: AT-X
- English network: US: Funimation Channel
- Original run: October 5, 2011 – December 21, 2011
- Episodes: 12
- Original video animation

Maken-Ki! OVA
- Directed by: Koichi Ohata (OVA 1); Hiraku Kaneko (OVA 2)
- Produced by: Naoshi Imamoto; Yoshiyuki Matsuzaki (OVA 1); Takumi Kusakabe (OVA 2)
- Written by: Yōsuke Kuroda
- Music by: Cheru Watanabe
- Studio: AIC Spirits (OVA 1); Xebec (OVA 2)
- Licensed by: Crunchyroll
- Released: March 1, 2012 – September 20, 2013
- Runtime: 24 minutes
- Episodes: 2
- Anime television series

Maken-Ki! Two
- Directed by: Hiraku Kaneko
- Produced by: Naoshi Imamoto; Takumi Kusakabe
- Written by: Yōsuke Kuroda
- Music by: Cheru Watanabe
- Studio: Xebec
- Licensed by: Crunchyroll
- Original network: Tokyo MX, tvk, Sun TV, TVQ, CTC, TV Saitama, Gifuhōsō, Mie TV, BS11, AT-X
- Original run: January 16, 2014 – March 20, 2014
- Episodes: 10
- icon

Maken-ki! (マケン姫っ!, Makenki'!) is a Japanese manga series by Hiromitsu Takeda. It was published by Fujimi Shobo's magazine Dragon Age Pure, and later Monthly Dragon Age, after the former magazine ceased publishing. It has been adapted into an anime series by AIC that aired on Tokyo MX in the fall of 2011. It is licensed in North America by Crunchyroll (also known as Funimation until 2022) under the title Maken-ki! Battling Venus. Two OVA episodes animated by AIC and Xebec were released at February 29, 2012, and September 25, 2013. They were bundled with the eighth and eleventh volumes of the manga respectively. A second season, titled Maken-ki! Two (マケン姫っ！通, Makenki! Tsū), was animated by Xebec and aired in 2014.

== Plot ==
Takeru Ooyama has enrolled at Tenbi Academy, a private prep high school that converted from all-girls to co-ed. Hoping to have a life full of ogling pretty girls, he reunites with childhood friend Haruko Amaya, who shows him around school. However, he learns that the school is for students who possess magical and spiritual energies called Elements and who wield crafted weapons known as Makens. The students engage in school sanctioned combat matches that showcase their powers. While his own ability and Maken is not apparent at first, Takeru soon finds himself surrounded by girls, including Inaho Kushiya, an attractive girl who says she's his fiancée, and Kodama Himegami, a popular blonde who says she wants to kill him. He joins the Security Committee (検警部, kenkeibu; lit. investigation/inspection club), which is part of the student council's Leadership Committee called the Magical Security Organization (魔導検警機構, madō kenkei kikō; lit. 'anti-evil organization'), also known as Maken-ki.

== Characters ==
=== Main characters ===
Takeru Ooyama (大山 タケル, Ōyama Takeru)
Voiced by: Tomoaki Maeno (Japanese); Ian Sinclair (English)
The main protagonist of the series, Takeru is a first-year high schooler who enrolls at Tenbi Academy after having attended an all-boys middle school. His childhood friend and fellow disciple, Haruko Amaya, also attends the school as does Inaho Kushiya, who claims that she is his fiancée. He ends up sharing his room with the two girls, as well as Kodama Himegami.^{[ch. 1]}
Several years before the story, when Takeru was nine and three-quarters, his family dojo was challenged by Tesshin Kushiya. His mother, Atsuma, was killed by Tesshin before his eyes. This incident caused him to hold a deep resentment for his father and uncle due to neither of them being there to protect them.^{[ch. 7]} As a result, he tends to take the girl's side whenever one gets into a fight with a guy; indicating he has intense white knight syndrome. His abilities originally manifest under extreme stress, as in the case where he protected Azuki.^{[ch. 3]} When he defended Kodama, he used "Blood Pointer",^{[ch. 5]} which was later described as "absorbing Element from the people around him through his mouth".^{[ch. 23]} Following the battle with the Venus Unit, Takeru undergoes extra training with Minori Rokujou in order to both increase and gain better control of his powers.^{[ch. 28–29]} He later learns that he is blood related to Kodama's brother.^{[ch. 53]}
Takeru was one of the three students that Gen's Element Detector, Keronbo, could not initially identify, but (a month later) he was given his Maken, "Overblow", which causes his target's Maken to overflow with Element and be rendered useless "like a car engine that blows out". However, if the opponent has an evolved Maken and can perfectly control/contain the surge, it can have the opposite effect and thereby empower the opponent.^{[ch. 19]}
Haruko Amaya (天谷 春恋, Amaya Haruko)
Voiced by: Noriko Shitaya (Japanese); Monica Rial (English)
A second-year student who is the student council vice president, and the head of one of the dorms.^{[ch. 1]} She is a childhood friend of Takeru Ooyama, whom she trained with at his family's dojo, and for whom she harbors romantic feelings for although she is unwilling to admit it.^{[ch. 1,12]} After learning that Kodama and Inaho are moving into Takeru's room, she decides to move in as well. She is very jealous of the attention Takeru gives the other girls and tends to beat him almost by reflex whenever he does anything even remotely perverted.^{[ch. 1]} Haruko is well-endowed^{[ch. 4]} and Kodama considers her to be the strongest maiden at Tenbi Academy.^{[ch. 5]} Haruko's Maken, Murakumo (lit. 'Gathering Clouds'), is a sword that is suspected to be one of the original Eight Legendary Maken.^{[ch. 6]} Murakumo cannot be unsheathed unless Haruko has strong feelings and fights an opponent with comparable power. Haruko unleashed a little of Murakumo's power when she fought a student named Kumi Amio.^{[ch. 6]} In her battle with Demitra Midia, she unsheathed it to reveal a blade surrounded with light. Not only are Haruko's attack big enough to destroy barriers, but they are controlled enough that she can spare the life of someone in the sword's path.^{[ch. 20]}
Kodama Himegami (姫神 コダマ, Himegami Kodama)
Voiced by: Sayuri Yahagi (Japanese); Cassandra Lee Morris (Season 1), Elizabeth Maxwell (Season 2) (English)
A petite, blonde-haired second-year student who is part of the security committee (kenkeibu) of Maken-ki, which officiates the duels at school.^{[ch. 1–4]} Her Maken, "Yasakani", allows her to command three shikigami named Kaguzuchi, Ikajichi and Nojichi, a trio of doll-sized familiars who follow her around and call her "ojou-sama" (literally "my lady" or "miss" in English) and who can lift people up as well as project fire (Kaguzuchi), lightning (Ikajichi) or wood (Nojichi) attacks.^{[ch. 1,2,5]} She regularly steps on the boys for their annoying and lecherous antics.^{[ch. 2,5]} She initially sees Takeru as a potential enemy who stole her first kiss, but rooms with him after noticing that he bears a special mark on his chest, and has a scent very similar to her brother's.^{[ch. 1]} She develops feelings for Takeru, although not like the other girls as when she was asked whom she likes, she responded that she loved someone long ago.^{[ch. 5]}^{[ch. 12]} Her hobbies include shopping, especially for lingerie and rare stuffed animals.^{[ch. 5]} When on night patrol, she was attracted to a rare King Penguin stuffed animal, and was captured by the Finnian twins of Venus.^{[ch. 14]} (Note: Kodama forgives the Finnian twins when they offer her the stuffed animal.^{[ch. 16]}) She later shows a fear of ghosts and spirits outside her own magic;^{[ch. 30,31]} in one instance, she's frightened by a ghost story that Haruto Kirishima admits he'd embellished.^{[ch. 34]}
Kodama later reveals that she has extraordinary abilities. In the battle with Venus, Kodama uses her Maken to summon larger spirits that are as powerful as the Legendary Eight Maken,^{[ch. 23]} and are comparable in strength to Martha Minerva or Minori Rokujou.^{[ch. 24]} The Kamigari are highly interested in her as a key to unleashing the power in Amanohara. The Venus Unit kidnaps her and, later on, Ouken has the Kamigari try to capture her on the summer training island. It is revealed that Kodama is the daughter of Yatsune, the former Yamata no Orochi,^{[ch. 49]}^{[ch. 49,50]} and that her servants are actually Yatsune's incarnations; each of which had been able to manifest one of the original Eight Maken. Kodama inherited her mother's powers but was sealed away on top on Mount Amanohara.^{[ch. 51–53]} Many years later, after her seal was weakened by Minori, Kodama used her Element to manifest an incarnation of herself.^{[ch. 53]} She later realizes that Takeru Ooyama is a descendant of her brother.^{[ch. 53]}
Inaho Kushiya (櫛八 イナホ, Kushiya Inaho)
Voiced by: Iori Nomizu (Japanese); Tia Ballard (English)
The self-proclaimed fiancée of Takeru Ooyama.^{[ch. 1]} She feels strongly for Takeru, and although he does not remember her much, she has decided to wait until he fully does.^{[ch. 12]} She holds Takeru's father in high regard. Upon revealing this, Takeru gets upset and ignores her, which causes her to cry. Takeru later apologizes to her after Kengo confronts him.^{[ch. 7]} However, in the anime, she cries after Takeru tells her that he cannot remember a childhood promise. At first, Inaho was one of the three students that the Element detector, Keronbo, could not measure. However, she manifests her Maken when she saves Takeru and a cat from a falling boulder. She names the cat Monji and usually wears him on her head. Her Maken, "Kamudo", is a gauntlet that greatly increases her strength and speed.^{[ch. 7]} She is the star of the bonus four panel series of Maken-ki comics where she is presented in super deformed mode.

=== Students ===
- Kengo Usui (碓 健吾, Usui Kengo) is Takeru's classmate who joins security committee of Maken-ki.^{[ch. 4]} He and Takeru become friends after having excused themselves from class in order to peek at girls during their physical examinations.^{[ch. 2]} He has a crush on Kodama.^{[ch. 5]} His Maken, "Point Man", lets him exchange himself or other people with an item in their place.^{[ch. 23]} Kengo is voiced by Satoshi Tsuruoka, and English dubbed by Scott Freeman in the first season and by Anthony Bowling in the second season.
- Azuki Shinatsu (志那都 アズキ, Shinatu Azuki) is a hot-tempered second year student who typically sports a small bandage on her nose.^{[ch. 1]} She is a Magical Enforcer Committee (Madou Shikkobu) member of Maken-ki. After Takeru Ooyama's interference in Azuki's duel with Kai Kuragasa, the latter feels humiliated and a conflict starts between them.^{[ch. 3]} (Note: In the anime, however, Takeru's interference leads to Azuki losing her panties, causing her further embarrassment.) However, both eventually become friends when Takeru forgives Syria Ootsuka.^{[ch. 19]} She works at a maid café named Macaroon Mansion.^{[ch. 5]} Her Maken, "Hawk", is a mechanized boot which boosts her leg strength, granting her superior agility and speed. As a result, she usually fights using her legs.^{[ch. 1,3]} Azuki is voiced by Misuzu Togashi, and English dubbed by Morgan Garrett.
- Uruchi Minaya (水屋 うるち, Minaya Uruchi) is a Magical enforcer Committee Member of Maken-ki. She's obsessed with Haruko, and despises Takeru for spending so much time with her. When she was younger, she had made a lunch only for bullies to harass her until Haruko drove them off and offered Minaya some of her own lunch. After a student controlled by the Kamigari fights her and Takeru, she is rescued again by Haruko.^{[ch. 6]} Uruchi is voiced by Shizuka Furuya, and is English dubbed by Cherami Leigh.
- Furan Takaki (高貴 楓蘭, Takaki Furan) is the student council president at Tenbi Academy. She wears glasses and her hair is braided. She is shy around boys and even states that she dislikes men.^{[ch. 37]} In the anime, she is very attracted to Akaya from Venus, whom she falls for at their first meeting because (unlike the peeping guys) he appears like a gentleman. Despite her shyness, Furan is very strict when it comes to the duties of Maken-ki duties that need to be carried out. The anime features a recurring gag where the other female Maken-ki members expose Furan's panties in front of the guys to reveal various animal prints such as a bear, cat, and frog; this is an extension from a manga scene during the female bonding time at the summer cabin.^{[ch. 37]} Ouken reveals that her fear of men is because, as an advanced talent, she was chosen by Kamigari to be one of his mistresses and was ravished in place of Yuka. Furan's Maken, "Habaya", is a bow that fires homing light arrows.^{[ch. 48]} Furan is voiced by Aya Gōda, and she is English dubbed by Brittney Karbowski.
- Yuka Amato (雨渡 穣華, Amato Yūka) is the student council treasurer. She is a close friend of Furan, whom she likes to tease. Yuka appears to be carefree most of the time but also very cunning and encourages Maken-ki activities that involve some kind of other work that needs to be done. For instance, she sets up a competition between Maken-ki and Venus where the players use broom sticks to push a bar of soap around an empty pool.^{[ch. 10]} She has a friendly personality like her sister Tomiko, who is Takeru's homeroom teacher; they sometimes coordinate activities.^{[ch. 30]} She later reveals that for many generations, the Amado family has been serving the Rokujou family as their oniwaban (ninja).^{[ch. 33]} Yuka is voiced by Natsumi Takamori, and English dubbed by Jamie Marchi.
- Kimi Satō (砂藤 季美, Satō Kimi) is the student council secretary. Her Maken, "Comic Star", is the result of her love of manga, as she can draw something and bring it to reality. She is close friends with Chacha, and they often work together.^{[ch. 4]} Kimi is voiced by Misato, and English dubbed by Alexis Tipton.
- Chacha Akaza (藜 チャチャ, Akaza Chacha) is a security committee member of Maken-ki; she has a dark complexion. Her Maken, "Compressor", allows her to change the shape and density of objects allowing her to do things such as extending a small broken plank into an enormous board.^{[ch. 4]} Chacha is voiced by Saeko Zōgō, and English dubbed by Trina Nishimura.
- Kai Kuragasa (栗傘 塊, Kuragasa Kai) is a first-year student who duels Azuki early on in the series. He wagers that if he wins he will date her. His Maken, "Full Metal", allows him to harden any part of his body into steel, granting him far greater strength and endurance.^{[ch. 3]} Although he loses the fight because of Takeru's interference, he continues to pursue Azuki from afar, including visiting her at the maid café where she works.^{[ch. 26]} Kai is voiced by Go Inoue, and English dubbed by Andrew T. Chandler.

=== Staff ===
- Minori Rokujou (六条 実, Rokujō Minori) is the principal and physical education teacher at Tenbi Academy.^{[ch. 1,2]} She permits Inaho, Kodama and Haruko to live in Takeru's dorm room.^{[ch. 1]} She brandishes incredible power and control over Element, as she can break through amazingly powerful barriers with her bare hands, thanks to nothing more than (in her own words) her "fighting spirit".^{[ch. 24,32]} She ranks herself on the same level as Ouken Yamato.^{[ch. 35]} and was in the Maken-ki student group before the school was converted to an all-girls' academy.^{[ch. 8,11]} Her Maken, "Dragon Ace", is a pair of gauntlets that allow her to create heat sources and ignite them into fire-based attacks.^{[ch. 42,43]} Minori is voiced by Mina and English dubbed by Caitlin Glass.
- Gen Tagayashi (耕志 玄, Tagayashi Gen) is the creator of the Maken in the school. He was in the Maken-ki student group before it was converted to an all-girls academy. He can create replica Maken which is done for each student at the academy. He is able to do this through his "Dark Element" which is later explained to be the Black Element, which is created by having all four of the main Elements in his body instead of the usual major and minor Elements. He is one of five people known to have this ability.^{[ch. 50]} Gen is voiced by Atsushi Imaruoka, and English dubbed by Robert McCollum.
- Aki Nijou (二条 秋, Nijō Aki) is the school nurse^{[ch. 2]}, art teacher and the staff adviser for Maken-ki.^{[ch. 4]} She and Minori were Maken-ki members.^{[ch. 8,11]} She has a large chest and curvaceous body that has drawn much attention from the boys and envy from the girls.^{[ch. 2,4,10]} She has the largest breasts in the series where a flashback in Episode 5 of Season 2 shows that they became really big when she was only 12. Despite her strange and immodest choices of clothing^{[ch. 4,28,29,32]} and healing practices,^{[ch. 16]} she is soft-spoken and acts shy at times.^{[ch. 10,13,14,28]} Minori later tells the boys that Aki is still a virgin.^{[ch. 38]} She knows Akaya from when they were schoolmates, and senses when he has been lying.^{[ch. 16,24]} In addition to her healing abilities, she has a Maken, "Valhelm", but it is more a diagnostic tool that allows her to determine what parts of a person are injured the most.^{[ch. 46]} In the anime, she has long, dark blue hair, and her appearance during the closing credits makes Haruko jealous. Aki is voiced by Hitomi Harada, and English dubbed by Heather Walker.
- Tomika Amato (雨渡 豊華, Amato Tomika) is Takeru's homeroom teacher.^{[ch. 2]} She also was a member of Maken-ki before it had to become an all-girls academy.^{[ch. 2]} Minori sometimes acts as her classroom assistant. She has a pleasant personality like her younger sister Yuka Amato,^{[ch. 4]} although Minori thinks she has a sadistic side.^{[ch. 37.5]} Tomika is voiced by Yuki Matsuoka, and English dubbed by Shelley Calene-Black.

=== Venus ===
Venus is a mercenary unit that joins Tenbi Academy with the mission to search for the person who is trying to revive Yamata no Orochi. It is headed by Akaya Kodai, a former member of Maken-ki, and consists mainly of high school aged girls.^{[ch. 8,9]} It is later revealed that Venus has ties to Kamigari, and thus serve as the antagonists for a storyline where they plant barrier stones throughout Tenbi Academy, capture Kodama under the pretense that she trespassed into the Amanohara, and challenge Maken-ki to rescue her.^{[ch. 14,15]} The Venus unit uses Jingu, which are equipment used by the gods of their Western homelands; they are comparable to the Maken weapons used by the gods of the East.^{[ch. 16]}

- Akaya Kodai (古大 赤耶, Kodai Akaya) is the commander of Venus, and the sole male member.^{[ch. 8]} He is a former member of the Maken-ki student group, before it became an all-girls academy.^{[ch. 8]} While Venus stays at Tenbi Academy, Akaya challenges Takeru's viewpoint of wanting to protect all girls when he asks Takeru what he would do if a girl were to do bad things to another person.^{[ch. 12]} In a fight against Takeru, Akaya uses a Maken revolver named Swindle, where each bullet has a different ability including illusion, vision, and hypnosis, and dummy. Years before the series' present, Akaya leads the group of Tenbi Academy students to assault the female student years back, which results in the school's changing to all-girls, and also kills Takeru's mother; he reveals his past to have Takeru unleash his ultimate powers.^{[ch. 23]} He later says that the fight was mainly to test Takeru's strength to report it to the Kamigari.^{[ch. 24]} He appears in a disciplinary trial in front of Ouken, in which the latter punishes and brutalizes him, leaving in a state of stupor,^{[ch. 30]} however, it is later revealed he used his dummy bullet. Akaya intends to unmask the spirit that has taken over Ouken's body.^{[ch. 33]} Akaya is voiced by Makoto Yasumura, and his English dub voiced is provided by Eric Vale.
- Demitra Midia (デミトラ ミディア, Demitora Midia) is the vice commander of Venus. Her Jingu is a trident, which enhances her water-based abilities. She can create and control water, including spinning it so it destroys objects, hardening droplets to act like bullets, building a wall of water, and even drawing out moisture from a person.^{[ch. 19]} Yan Min regards her as a very strong fighter.^{[ch. 19]} She rarely smiles except at those whose power she acknowledges, such as Martha.^{[ch. ??]} Seven years before the start of the series, she is recruited by Akaya to join Venus after having grown up in a Southern European orphanage.^{[ch. 21]} Demitra is voiced by Rie Tanaka, and is English dubbed by Martha Harms.
- Syria Ootsuka (シリア 大塚, Syria Ōtsuka) is a defense member of Venus, and an idol celebrity from America.^{[ch. 8,9]} While at Tenbi Academy, she flirts openly with Takeru, and makes the other girls jealous.^{[ch. 9]} When she fights Inaho, she uses professional wrestler moves.^{[ch. 18]} Her Jingu, Inverse, allows her to reverse situations at will.^{[ch. 16]} For instance, if someone rushes her, she can fling her away; when Takeru rushes, she instead nullifies his will to fight.^{[ch. 18]} However, when Takeru uses his Overblow ability, Syria loses her Inverse power, and is revealed to be a transgender woman. Despite the defeat Syria still pursues Takeru and gives him a kiss.^{[ch. 19]} (Note: In the anime's first season, Syria remains a girl; she falls in love with Takeru when he shows a cool-looking stance to protect Haruko, during the volleyball match between Venus and Maken-ki. Takeru jumps in and accidentally lands on Syria instead of Haruko, much to Kodama's annoyance because of Syria's chest.) Syria is voiced by Mariya Ise, and is English dubbed by Jad Saxton.
- Yang Ming (ヤン・ミン, Yan Min) is the special attack member of Venus; she dresses in Chinese clothes.^{[ch. 8]} Her Jingu is Kinben, which takes the form of a two-tailed whip. She can fuse Kinben into her body and use Reirii, which increases her speed and reduces her reaction time. Her abilities are lightning based; she can perform Thunder Fist (Reichin), which turns her fists into lightning and increases her power.^{[ch. 17]} Yang Ming is voiced by Satomi Akesaka in the Japanese dub, and Terri Doty in the English dub.
- Martha Minerva (ミネルバ マーサ, Mineruba Māsa) is a defense member of Venus; she arrives after the other members have already settled in at Tenbi Academy.^{[ch. 10,11]} She is usually addressed by her last name. She initially appears as a carefree airhead who likes to keep her eyes closed in order to look more mature.^{[ch. 11]} Her Jingu, Aegis, allows her to open gates to other dimensions. She can make limbs disappear from and reappear in the current dimension so as to stop physical attacks. When she opens her eyes, she emits an inexhaustible stream of Element that engulfs everyone and creates a territory where she can further use powers such as selectively making the clothing of the girls disappear. She thus proclaims herself the Master of Lingerie.^{[ch. 22]} Minori ranks Martha the highest of the ability users.^{[ch. 35]} Martha is voiced by Rina Satō in the Japanese version, and by Leah Clark in the English dub.
- Lilou Finnian (リール フィニアン, Rīru Finian) and Aililou Finnian (アイリル フィニアン, Airiru Finian) are a pair of twins who are the special investigators in Venus; one has light hair while the other one has dark hair. The Tenbi Academy students refer to them as dolls.^{[ch. 9]} Their combined Jingu, Time/Space Keep, allows them to create barriers in which to imprison targets, prevent outsiders from intruding, or contain events within a space.^{[ch. 14,22,24]} After the last barrier is lifted, the damage to people within the space can be undone; this includes wounds inflicted.^{[ch. 24]} Minori ranks the twins as among the most powerful ability users.^{[ch. 35]} Lilou and Aililou are both voiced by Rina Hidaka in the Japanese dub, and by Michelle Hong in the English dub.

=== Kamigari ===
The Kamigari are a secret organization that works with the government by using the Elements and Maken.^{[ch. 8]} They originally gathered young people who possess special abilities to their organization, usually against their will. Those who opposed had their memories wiped.^{[ch. 11]} This continued until the government created Tenbi Academy to train the students.^{[ch. 11]} As a result, they partner with Tenbi Academy in selecting students to join their organization.^{[ch. 21]} After Venus leaves Tenbi Academy, they continue their experiments by possessing people and growing monsters to attack the Maken-ki members during their summer training activities.^{[ch. 26–31]} Ouken later decides to go after unlocking the secrets of Amanohara.

- Ouken Yamato (大和 王建, Yamato Ōken) is the leader of the Kamigari. One of his abilities is Soul Collector, which allows him to manipulate the memories of people; he did this on Akaya Kodai to make him think that he had assaulted a girl during the early years of Tenbi Academy.^{[ch. 25]} His Soul Collector can replenish Element by eating the souls from people.^{[ch. 42]} He is shown to have a split personality: his original one is calm and composed but has been suppressed for ten years; the newer personality is a power-hungry maniac that is hellbent on releasing the seal on Amanohara to unlock its secrets. During Akaya's disciplinary trial, the calm Ouken asks Akaya to stop the evil that has taken over him, after which he apparently dies and the power-hungry Ouken takes over.^{[ch. 30]} Eventually, after being heavily wounded by Takeru Ooyama, Ouken is killed by Kodama Himegami.^{[ch. 53]}
- Otohime "The Manipulator" Yamato (大和 乙姫, Yamato Otohime)^{[ch. 41]} is Ouken's granddaughter and a first-year student at Tenbi Academy. Her Doll House ability allows her to fashion a voodoo doll to manipulate her opponent.^{[ch. 11]} Because of her petite appearance, she is mistaken for being younger than her high school age by Haruko Amaya.^{[ch. 26]} She performs experiments where she manipulates some creatures and people with a chemical that is similar to Ouken's Soul Collector ability.^{[ch. 29]} She is one of the four Shishigami who serves Ouken.^{[ch. 41]} She is later revealed to be one of the clones from Takeru Yamato's DNA.^{[ch. 54,55]} Otohime is voiced by Yoshino Nanjō, and English dubbed by Carrie Savage.
- Gouken Yamato (大和 剛建, Yamato Gōken) is Otohime's twin brother.^{[ch. 11]} His Cancel ability nullifies Element attacks.^{[ch. 44]} As one of the clones developed by Takeru Yamato, he becomes the vessel for Takeru after Ouken's death.^{[ch. 54,55]} Gouken is voiced by Yūto Suzuki, and English dubbed by Todd Haberkorn.
- Kikyo Yamato (大和 桔梗, Yamato Kikyō) is Otohime's sister. Kikyo is voiced by Shizuka Itō, and is English dubbed by Anastasia Muñoz.
- Miyabi "The Temptress" Ootori (大鳥 雅, Ōtori Miyabi)^{[ch. 42]} is Ouken's private secretary and a member of the Shishigami.^{[ch. 21]} Her ability allows her to "eat" someone and send them to another dimension. Her Maken, Missing Lip, originates from her shoe.^{[ch. 42]}
- Leo Hirata (平田レオ, Hirata Reo) is a Tenbi Academy alumnus who works for the Kamigari. His abilities are in electricity; he calls himself Lightning Panther, but Minori Rokujou, his former schoolmate, calls him Hopeless Leo. He first meets the Maken-ki gang at the island where they are doing summer training.^{[ch. 29]} Leo is voiced by Yutaka Furukawa, and is English dubbed by Aaron Roberts.
- Hakuto "The Phantom" Kirishima (霧島 白兎, Kirishima Hakuto) is one of the four Shishigami who serve directly under Ouken.^{[ch. 41]} He initially poses as a botanist when the Maken-ki gang look for a flower to help Haruko recover.^{[ch. 34]} He later reveals himself to be a monster who took a drug that had Ouken's Element.^{[ch. 44]}
- Tesshin Kushiya (櫛八 鉄心, Kushiya Tesshin), is a member of the Shishigami, who is able to defeat Maken users without having to use a Maken or any drug enhancements. His power and ability is comparable to Ouken, and he can fight Maken users backhandedly.^{[ch. 44]} Ten years before the start of the series, he kills Takeru's mother, Atsuma, although he insists that she was already dying.^{[ch. 44]} His special ability is Blood Pointer, although he considers it an imitation to the ability he sees in Atsuma and consequently Takeru.^{[ch. 45]} As the adoptive father of Inaho, he puts her through harsh training so she will not abandon him, but is imprisoned by Kamigari for kidnapping and child abuse. Ouken later frees him on the condition that he fights Ouken's rival, Atsuma. After defeating her, Tesshin leaves Inaho in her family's care in order to do more training.^{[ch. 46]}
- Takeru Yamato (大和 タケル, Yamato Takeru) is the ancestor of Ouken Yamato, and younger brother of Kodama's father. He acts as the underlying antagonist within Kamigari. His original name is Mousu no Mikoto, the second prince of the Yamato court.^{[ch. 50,51]} He originally hunts his brother and family, but is defeated by Kodama's brother Yabiko. However, he is able to maintain his existence by possessing people. He seals his soul in a jar, which is unearthed by Ouken, whom he possesses. He develops a secret lab of clones that would serve as a proper vessel for his soul; two of the chosen vessels are Otohime and Gouken.^{[ch. 54,55]}

== Media ==
=== Manga ===
Written and illustrated by Hiromitsu Takeda. It was published by Fujimi Shobo's magazine Dragon Age Pure, and later Monthly Dragon Age, after the former magazine ceased publishing.

==== Volumes ====
No.	Release date	ISBN
1	June 5, 2008	978-4-04-712553-7
1. First Day in Heaven (天を契んだ日, Ten o Chiginda Hi); 2. Physical Examination (測定するは身体のみか, Sokutei suru wa shintai nomi ka); 3. Girls Are Amazing (女の子はスゴイんです, Onnanoko wa Sugoin desu); 4. Makenki Activates (魔導検警機構始動, MAKENKI Shidou); 5. The Enemy Within Tenbi (敵は天日にあり, Teki wa Tenbi ni Ari)
Takeru Ooyama, who attended an all-boys middle school, enrolls in Tenbi Academy with his childhood friend Haruko Amaya. Kodama Himegami watches from atop a tree branch, but when Takeru calls her out, she falls down and inadvertently kisses him. At the welcoming ceremony, Takeru witnesses a duel between two girls, and learns that fighting and martial arts will be part of their regular school life. He is chosen to duel Kodama, but the fight is interrupted by Inaho Kushiya, who proclaims herself his fiancee. Afterwards, principal Minori Rokujou advises Inaho, Kodama and consequently Haruko, to board with Takeru. On the day of his examination, Takeru's Element cannot be determined. Haruko recruits Takeru to join the kenkeibu, a student run organization that to ensure the fairness of duels and to protect the duelers. He discovers that the group is being merged with another enforcement group into the madō kenkei kikō or "maken-ki". They have a gathering at a co-ed hot springs, but a bear interrupts the festivities, and some of the members demonstrate their powers to fend it off. Later, Kodama takes Takeru on a date; they are followed by Haruko, Inaho and Takeru's friend Kengo Usui. Takeru is unable to remember anything after saving Kodama from an encounter with a stranger from Kamigari, and she kisses him.
2	December 5, 2008	978-4-04-712582-7
6. Tenbi's Strongest Maiden; 7. Rainy Days In Tenbi; 8. Mercenary Unit Venus; 9. A Day In Tenbi – Exchange Student Chapter; 10. Water Arena
Takeru is assigned by student body president Furan Takaki to investigate a criminal who makes victims unconscious. Takeru, along with fellow student Uruchi Minaya, encounter the criminal, who reveals herself to be Kumi Amio. Using her maken, Kumi summons a spider and traps Takeru and Uruchi in its web. Haruko rescues the two and uses her Maken, Murakumo, to knock Kumi out. The rainy season's arrival causes Inaho to remember flashbacks of when she first met Takeru eight years earlier. She discovers a cat, and names him Monji. When Inaho tells her about Takeru's father, Takeru leaves her, causing her to become depressed, Kengo confronts him in frustration. Takeru decides to apologize to her alone when he is informed that the cat has gone missing. He is able to save the cat just as Inaho saves him, and the two reconcile. Meanwhile, Venus, a mercenary unit a mercenary unit composed of women led by a man named Akaya Kodai, arrives. Akaya reveals that Kamigari is an organization using Maken and Element to support the country from the shadows and was founded after some people refused to be ruled by the gods. Venus challenges Tenbi to a fight, but decide to fight in a field hockey match which ends in a draw. Later, the men at Tenbi successfully petitions to use the pool with the women to engage in a duel, in which the competitors have to take the headbands to win. However, when Venus member Syria Ootsuka takes Takeru and Kengo's headbands, the game ends in a draw once again.
3	September 7, 2009	978-4-04-712626-8
Omake; 11. Boys Are Perplexed By; 12. Your Unchanging Wish; 13. The Day When The Sky Breaks – Morning; 14. The Day When The Sky Breaks – Afternoon; 15. Because I'm Stupid
Takeru and Kengo encounter Martha Minerva, a member of Venus, and are introduced to some of the Venus members. Takeru serves as an official for a match between Otohime Yamato and Sho Tachinami. However, Otohime uses his Doll House technique and injures Takeru. Due to failing his Element exams, the kenkeibu is forced to help Takeru study for the make up exam or they will be removed if they get a score below 60. Martha gathers intelligence for Kamigari, revealing the extent of Kodama and Takeru's powers. Meanwhile, Akaya reveals that Kodama holds a clue to what Kamigari's leader Ouken Yamato desires, and is ordered to capture Kodama. Later, a Venus member named Yang Ming injures Kai Kuragusa, a Tenbi student, and Akaya forces Takeru and the others to guard Tenbi and send the other students home. Inside the academy, Kodama is frightened when she sees ghosts and is captured. Akaya announces that Kodama will be transported to the Kamigari headquarters in an hour. The group discovers that Venus placed barriers around the academy. Inaho finds a building where they can go up and save Kodama. With encouragement from fellow student Azuki Shinatsu, Takeru and the others infiltrate the building but are cornered by Yan Min and Syria. Haruko goes on ahead while Azuki fights Ming. Using her Maken Hawk, Azuki transforms her shoe into a mechanized boot.
4	April 8, 2010	978-4-04-712660-2
16. What God Left Behind; 17. This Is The Battlefield; 18. The Maken's Name Is...; 19. The Two Who Are Alike; 20. The Swing That Splits The Heavens; 21. Precious Memories
As Aki Hinata is healing Kai, Kodama discovers that Kamigari's leader Ouken Yamato is seeking more power by releasing it within Tenbi. Though Ming is overpowered by Azuki's Maken, she is able to use her own Maken, Kinben, and fights with Azuki. Meanwhile, as Haruko tries to rescue Kodama and is cornered by Venus' vice commander Demitra Midia on the third floor, Takeru and Inaho confront Syria. When Ming gains the upper hand on Azuki, Takeru tries to rescue her but is furiously attacked by Ming. Azuki releases Takeru from Ming's grasps and injures her leg with a piano string. Takeru decides to rescue Kodama by himself just as Azuki is able to defeat Ming. Inaho continues to fight Syria, but is beaten up in the process and Takeru rescues her. Using her inversion ability, Syria reverts Takeru's determination and beats him up. Inaho attacks Syria with her Kamudo, rendering her unconscious. Takeru snaps and uses his Maken, Overblow, to expose Syria as a man and defeats him. The two reconcile with each other as Takeru says that he is Syria's friend. While dueling with Haruko, Demitra uses her trident to destroy Haruko's shinai and suck the water out of her before Haruko uses her Maken Murakumo to continue the fight. Eventually, Haruko uses Murakumo to destroy the academy's barriers and defeat Demitra by showing her mercy. Meanwhile, after meeting with Ouken and his secretary Miyabi Ootori, Minori receives a call from Uruchi, Aki and Kengo that they are going to find Takeru and the others. Realizing that she has been tricked, Minori and the others arrive at Tenbi. With the impending approach of the other students, Akaya dispatches Martha Minerva to fight them.
5	October 7, 2010	978-4-04-712689-3
22. The Strong And The Weak; 23. Maken Yasakani; 24. The Battle Ends; 25. Tenbi Gakuen's 1st Semester Ends; 26. Makaroon's Special Service Day – First Part; 27. Makaroon's Special Service Day – Second Part
6	April 7, 2011	978-4-04-712720-3
28. Summer/Swimsuits/Training; 29. Beware Of Sea Monsters; 30. Beware Of Monsters In The Forest; 31. The Right Hand That Protects Friends; 32. The Flow Keeps Flowing; 33. Wait For Me! My Paradise!!
7	October 6, 2011	978-4-04-712752-4
34. The Ability User Without An Ability; 35. The Crazy Bunch; 36. An Enemy On Our road; 37. Virgins And Cherries; 38. The Enemy Has Come
8	March 7, 2012	978-4-04-712781-4
39 (Part 1). Drink & Meet; 39 (Part 2). Youthful Days; 40. Break Point; 41. Kotodama; 42. Leave It To Me; 43. The Emperor Vs. The School Director; 44. Tesshin
9	September 6, 2012	978-4-04-712827-9
45. Thank You; 46. Regretful Memories; 47. You can't avoid the things you can't see; 48. Mami Habaya; 49. That Kind of Person isn't Human; 50. This Is A Story From Long Ago
10	March 7, 2013	978-4-04-712860-6
51. Those Are Her Irreplaceable Memories; 52. And Her Spinning Soul; 53. Who Cares; 54. Clone; 55. The Resurrected And The Vanished
11	October 9, 2013	978-4-04-712905-4
56. The Two Takerus; 57. The Power Of Blood; 58. A Small Promise; 59. Scars And Promise; 60. The Start Of The Festivities; 61. With That, The Summer Ends; 61.5. Road To Becoming Supreme Ruler (Delusion) Episode 002
12	March 8, 2014	978-4-04-070050-2
62. Now Is The Festival Of The Autumn Beginnings; 63. A Student's Role; 64. School Festival!; 65. It's Too Late To Repent; 66. Deluxe Pole Topplin; 66.5. Usui-kun, The Road To Becoming Supreme Ruler (A Delusion) Episode 003
13	October 9, 2014	978-4-04-070339-8
67. The Man Who Exchanged Fists; 68. True Master; 69. A Way To Enjoy The Festival; 70. Dynamic Quiz Game; 70.5. magnificent way of harem
14	March 9, 2015	978-4-04-070353-4
71. What in The World is That?; 72. The one Who Perished; 73. Lucky Woman; 74. Haruko and Aki's Throbbing Animal Land; 75. *Smells* Like a *Warrior*; 76. A Warrior That Evolves
15	September 9, 2015	978-4-04-070684-9
77. An Inherited Right Arm; 78. True Kamudo; 79. A Maken That Evolves; 80. A Demon Returns; 80.5 [Oneshot] She Is an Irregular Succubus
16	March 9, 2016	978-4-04-070833-1
81. Maken "Kanayago"; 82 Footsteps of the Evil God; 83 I Wanted to Meet You; 84 Utopia of the Strong
17	September 9, 2016	978-4-04-072021-0
85 Worthless, Insignificant Fellows; 86 Staking His Soul; 87 Overlapping Powers; 88 Irreplaceable Time; 89 The Sacrificial Maiden
18	March 9, 2017	978-4-04-072209-2
90 Go, Decisive Battle: Amanohara; 91 Adventurous Decisive Battle; 92 A Man's Worth; 93 The Sea Empress; 94 A Maken's Birth
19	September 8, 2017	978-4-04-072435-5
95 The Maken Crusher; 96 The 'World' Which He Desires; 97 The Line of Death; 98 His Reason to Not Run; 99 For the Person Behind Him
20	March 9, 2018	978-4-04-072631-1
100 Iron Will; 101 Trump Cards In Both Hands; 102 They Don't Understand; 103 The Defiant Men; 103.5 Ezaki-Senpai Is Troubled
21	September 7, 2018	978-4-04-072876-6
104 Resurrection; 105 Yamata no Orochi; 106 Orochi's Heads; 107 Those in Fear; 108 Beguilement of Blue Illusion
22	April 9, 2019	978-4-04-073132-2
109 Letters of Truth; 110 The Battle of Prides; 111 Peak of the Battle; 112 Ruler of Death; 113 To Live and Smile; 113.5 Usui-kun, Road to Supreme Ruler (Delusion) 10
23	September 9, 2019	978-4-04-073324-1
114 Cowards Have No Place to Escape to; 115 Snake-Eating Rats; 116 The People Whom the Evil God Seeks; 117 The Future Which the Evil God Desires; 118 Torches of Life; 118.5 Usui-kun, Road to Supreme Ruler (Delusion) 11
24	March 9, 2020	978-4-04-073569-6
119 Not a Loner's Privilege; 120 Like Those Strong People; 121 The Fool is Here; 122 For the Children of Tenbi; 123 Home, a Place to Return to; 124 And the Spring Comes

=== Anime ===
An anime adaptation was announced on Monthly Dragon Age's official website in December 2010. In April 2011, Monthly Dragon Age confirmed that the anime series would air on television. Produced by AIC under the direction of Kōichi Ōhata with Yōsuke Kuroda as script supervisor and music by Cher Watanabe, the anime series began its first broadcast run on October 5, 2011. A second season, titled Maken-ki! Two, was animated by Xebec and aired in 2014. The first season adapts the first four volumes of the manga, while the second season features completely original, self-contained story arcs.

The anime series is licensed by Funimation Entertainment (now known as Crunchyroll) in North America. A cast announcement was made on August 30, 2013, and the complete first season was released on home video on November 12. The series became available on the FunimationNOW video streaming service, and from March 2022, it became available on the Crunchyroll streaming service, after AT&T divested Crunchyroll to Sony Pictures Television in August 2021.

==== Maken-ki! ====
No. overall	No. in season	Title	Original air date
1	1	"The Day We Swore to Heaven" "Ten o chiginda hi" (天を契んだ日)	October 5, 2011
Haruko Amaya accompanies longtime childhood friend Takeru Ooyama to his first day at Tenbi Academy, a private prep high school that converted from all-girls to co-ed. After Haruko excuses herself to prepare for the welcoming ceremony, Takeru wanders around outside to take in the view and witnesses a curious confrontation between two female students named Azuki Shinatsu and Garrett Kinua, who are later revealed to be settling a wager over a teddy bear. He also he has an embarrassing run-in with Kodama Himegami, who was watching the battle from a tree. At the welcoming ceremony, Takeru learns from principal and physical education teacher Minori Rokujou that fighting is a way of life for the students, in which they will be given an Element that they will need to master during their pursuit of obtaining one of the original eight crafted weapons called Maken. Kodama challenges Takeru to a duel, but this match is interrupted by Inaho Kushiya, who happily claims to be Takeru's fiancée. Takeru is later placed in the dormitory, where he ends up being roommates with Kodama and Inaho. However, a jealous Haruko decides to move in with them as well.
2	2	"Girls Are Amazing" "Onnanoko wa Sugoin desu" (女の子はすごいんです)	October 12, 2011
Takeru walks in on Kodama changing clothes in the bathroom and gets an eyeful. After breakfast, the four roommates are nearly late for school, earning Haruko a warning from student council president Furan Takaki. During homeroom class, homeroom teacher Tomika Amato informs all students that a physical examination is required in the nurse's office. Takeru and male classmate Kengo Usui sneak out of the classroom to peep on the girls in the nurse's office from a tree. Kodama catches them but does not kill them. During the boys' physical examinations, school nurse Aki Nijou is unable to determine Takeru's Element, which leaves him without a Maken and renders him defenseless in case of a duel, though Inaho vows to protect him. Minori and Maken creator Gen Tagayashi are concerned that Takeru cannot be matched with a Maken. Takeru later wants to join the pin-up girl photo club. However, Haruko forbids this, as she suggests for him to consider the security committee (kenkeibu).
3	3	"Welcome to Maken-ki" "MAKENKI e Yōkoso" (マケンキへようこそ)	October 19, 2011
Takeru walks in on Haruko showering in the bathroom this time. To mollify her at school, he asks about the security committee. As the vice president of the student council, Haruko explains that the leadership committee is divided into the security committee and the magical enforcer committee (madou shikkobu). Takeru learns that the mission of the security committee is to ensure the fairness of duels and to protect the duelers. During a duel at the school track, Azuki uses her Maken, Hawk, a mechanized boot, in order to defeat hopeless romantic Kai Kuragasa, who uses his Maken, Full Metal, which makes his body as hard as steel. Takeru commits to joining the security committee, but Kengo and Inaho also join for their own reasons. A welcoming party for new club members is held at an onsen in the mountains with provisions for mixed-bathing, requiring all members to wear a swimsuit. Despite formal introductions, this does not stop Takeru and Kengo from ogling their cohorts. An intrusion of a bear provides the opportunity for the leadership committee members to show off their abilities and demonstrate the spirit of the magical security organization (madō kenkei kikō), or Maken-ki for short.
4	4	"The Enemy Is at Tenbi" "Teki wa Tenbi ni Ari" (敵は天日にあり)	October 26, 2011
After Takeru, Inaho and Kengo go through seemingly intense basic training for the security committee, Takeru gets a massage from Inaho and Haruko. This is interrupted when Kodama asks Takeru to meet with her at the park. Kodama secretly wants to investigate the mysterious mark that Takeru bears on his chest, which she noticed on their first encounter. They shop at a lingerie store at the mall, visit a maid café where Azuki surprisingly works and sit by the lake in the park, all while they are discreetly tailed by Haruko, Inaho and Kengo. Kodama and Takeru are later ambushed by Biyou Tanaka, Ei Kobayashi and Shiisuke Yamada, three male students who are big fans of Kodama. However, Kodama uses her Maken, Yasakani, which summons two of her shikigami, in order to throw Tanaka, Kobayashi and Yamada into the lake. When Hebiyama Hideteru, a member of the secret organization Kamigari, appears and attacks, Takeru momentarily saves Kodama after he kisses her in the lake, but Takeru remembers nothing afterward. Kodama then returns the kiss to Takeru, much to the consternation of Haruko, Inaho, Kengo, Tanaka, Kobayashi and Yamada.
5	5	"The Strongest Girl in Tenbi" "Tenbi Saikyō no Onna" (天日最強の女)	November 2, 2011
Annoyed that his pratfalls are just too convenient, Haruko encourages Takeru to make his own lunches from now on. Azuki judges an arm wrestling match between security committee member Chacha Akaza and a male student. Furan and student council treasurer Yuka Amato assigns Takeru and security committee member Uruchi Minaya to investigate random acts of violence on school grounds, where the victims have no memory of what happened and who did them. Meanwhile, Haruko and student council secretary Kimi Satō negotiate annual budgets with the other school clubs. Haruko remembers little faults about Takeru, while Uruchi recalls looking up to Haruko. Takeru later comes across a female student named Kumi Amio, soon revealed as the attacker of the victims. Kumi uses her Maken, Nephila, a yo-yo that can emit a spider web. After Takeru gets caught in the spider web, Uruchi arrives to fight back against Kumi, only to get caught as well. Acting on instinct, Haruko comes to the rescue, nullifying the spider web with her Maken, Murakumo, a heavenly blade with destructive power. Defeating Kumi, Haruko proves once again that she is the strongest girl in the school.
6	6	"Like Rain on a Sunny Day" "Tenbi ni Ame no Kudaru Gotoku" (天日に雨の降るごとく)	November 9, 2011
The return of the rainy season causes Inaho to experience flashbacks of when she first met Takeru in a park eight years ago. During Element practice in the gym, Takeru tells Kengo and Uruchi that Kumi does not remember attacking her victims. Minori demonstrates Element manipulation on Kai as an example of her strength. After shopping with Inaho at the grocery store, Takeru takes her to the park. With Takeru clueless about his promise that he made with her during childhood, a despondent Inaho wanders off in the mountains, where she discovers a stray cat and later names him Monji for the cross on his head. Meanwhile, Takeru is encouraged by Haruko and Kodama to search for Inaho, then he is berated by Kengo after learning that Inaho wandered into the mountains. A determined Takeru races to the mountains and saves Monji from rockfall, while Inaho uses her Maken, Kamudo, a gauntlet with great force, in order to save Takeru in response. Unable to remember the promise, which was to marry other each when they grow up, Takeru unwittingly says that he will always protect Inaho, which satisfies her.
7	7	"The Goddesses Who Came Down to Tenbi" "Tenbi no Orita Megamitachi" (天日に降りた女神たち)	November 16, 2011
A mercenary unit named Venus is slowly being gathered. Gen learns from Kengo that Takeru tried to break up a fight between two girls before Haruko showed up, but it did not end well. Takeru then receives his Maken from Gen just as Venus arrives on school grounds. Akaya Kodai, commander of Venus, informs Minori that the female members of Venus will be exchange students until summer. He further explains that he is trying to hunt down the culprit who is trying to revive Yamata no Orochi. After the female members formally introduce themselves, Yang Ming, special attack member of Venus, provokes a rivalry with Azuki. To settle the score, Yuka organizes a three-on-three volleyball match in the gym between Haruko, Azuki and Chacha versus vice commander Demitra Midia, defense member Syria Ootsuka and Yang Ming. Aki serves as the referee, while Kodama, Inaho and Kimi serve as the cheerleading section. As the volleyball match progresses, things escalate exponentially, especially since Furan had wagered that Maken-ki would join Venus if they lose. It climaxes to a duel between Haruko and Demitra, destroying the gym. The volleyball match ends in a draw as both sides take a commemorative group photo.
8	8	"Syria will Give You Everything" "Shiria no Subete o Agechaimasu" (シリアの全てをあげちゃいマス)	November 23, 2011
Syria, a famous teen net idol, takes a strong liking to Takeru, while Kimi describes both Lilou Finnian and Aililou Finnian as dolls to Kodama. Yang Ming surpasses Garrett and Azuki at the long jump, while Haruko tells Demitra, a skilled onion slicer, to enjoy life at the school. Demitra, Yang Ming, Lilou and Aililou later encourage Syria to pursue Takeru. This means taking out the competition, namely Inaho, Haruko and Kodama. Takeru receives a secret love letter from Syria, telling him to meet her after school in the parking lot. Kengo informs Haruko and Kodama after finding out, and the latter two are assigned by Furan and Yuka to investigate the shrine behind the clock tower. Syria takes Takeru to a shack, while Haruko and Kodama are confronted by Yang Ming outside the shrine. When Inaho crosses paths with Haruko, Kodama and Yang Ming, it is discovered that Syria has taken Takeru into the shack to perform S&M, first perceived as sadomasochism. Haruko and Inaho run past Demitra to get to the shack. After Inaho destroys the shack, it is revealed that S&M stood for song and music.
9	9	"Stormy Games" "Arashi o Yobu Suijōbasen" (嵐を呼ぶ水上騎馬戦)	November 30, 2011
In the student council room, Kengo informs Furan that the boys are upset with the girls requesting the swimming classes to be separated. For the sake of gender equality, Kengo proposes to resolve the issue with a chicken fight competition in the school swimming pool, to which Furan approves. Of course, this means that the girls are forced to wear their swimsuits in front of the boys for the competition itself. Furan serves as judge, Yuka serves as commentator and Kimi serves as record keeper for the competition. As the competition progresses, the boys fare well against the girls. When Takeru is left against Syria, the sudden arrival of defense member Martha Minerva distracts Demitra and Yang Ming, who are on Syria's team, which allows Takeru to retrieve Syria's headband. Venus are able to execute their secret mission, now that Martha has arrived. Takeru and Kengo have no chance to enjoy the victory since male classmate Kageshiro Usuya used his Maken, Chameleon, in order to turn all the female students invisible during the first day of co-ed swimming class.
10	10	"The Girls of Light and Shadow" "Hikari to Kage no Shōjo" (光と影の乙女)	December 7, 2011
Martha appears on the school roof to Haruko, Inaho, Furan and Kimi, revealing that she can sense her surroundings with her eyes closed. Takeru and Kengo stumble into a fight between students Otohime "The Manipulator" Yamato and Sho Tachinami. Sho uses his Maken, Kaesto, a glove that allows him to instantly bring opponents within range, and Otohime uses her Maken, Doll House, an ability that allows her to fashion a voodoo doll in order to manipulate her opponent. However, Takeru interferes with Otohime's attacks when he fears for Sho's safety. Otohime is forced to leave when Martha and Akaya stop the fight. In the student council room, Takeru is scolded by Furan and Yuka for interfering with the duel and failing his Element practical exam, relieving his duties in Maken-ki. Martha then proposes Takeru to have an overnight cram session. While Martha has a slumber party with Haruko, Inaho and Kodama in the dorm room, Takeru trains with Kengo at the shrine. Kodama later confronts Martha in the woods, leading Martha to mention that Takeru possesses the same spiritual waveform as Kodama. The next day, Takeru aces the Element practical resit and resumes his duties in Maken-ki.
11	11	"Macaron Limited-Time Only Service Day" "Macaron Gentai Service Day" (まかろん限定サービスデー)	December 14, 2011
Gen and Minori explain to Takeru that his Maken, Overblow, is internal rather than external, in which his Maken can lose control of his opponent's Maken and render them powerless, but it will only work if his opponent is using theirs. In the student council room, Furan and Yuka pressure all the security committee members to raise money for the annual summer camp by having them sign up to work at the maid café for a special event. However, with the rise of popularity comes the increase in chaos, much to Azuki's annoyance. Takeru learns that Minori, Gen and Aki have stayed friends since their high school years. As the meal orders continue, Inaho bumps into Furan and Yuka as they walk in, prompting Takeru to console her. Chacha goes overboard on a practical joke about milk, causing an embarrassed Haruko to run outside in the parking lot. Otohime sends an unknown assailant to attack Haruko, but Takeru attempts to come to the rescue until Azuki ultimately defeats the unknown assailant. Minori, Gen and Aki soon find out that the unknown assailant is Catherine, the cross-dressing manager of the maid café, who was being mind-controlled by the Kamigari.
12	12	"Protectors of Paradise" "Rakuen o Mamorumono" (楽園を守るもの)	December 21, 2011
After Haruko is suddenly kidnapped by Otohime inside the secret base of the Kamigari, Takeru soon learns from Otohime's sister Kikyo Yamato that Haruko is supposedly on the top of the mountains in the custody of the Kamigari. Dueling Kikyo in the mountains, Takeru recalls his late mother Atsuma Ooyama telling him the true meaning of actual discipline and real strength, but this causes a burst of aura that awakens the spirit of Yamata no Orochi. Meanwhile, Otohime tells her brother Gouken Yamato that the Kamigari plan to take over Maken-ki once Takeru destroys Tenbi Academy. Inaho, Kodama, Kengo, Azuki, Uruchi, Kimi and Chacha try to fight back as Takeru appears at the schoolyard. While Haruko exploits the Kamigari for cowardly manipulating the powers of innocent people like Takeru, Venus arrive to save Haruko and deal with Kamigari. Thanks to Lilou and Aililou's Jingu, Time/Space Keep, Haruko teleports directly to the schoolyard. Haruko uses Murakumo to free Takeru from the spirit of Yamata no Orochi. Furan and Yuka, as well as the other members of Maken-ki, chase Kikyo from allowing her to take Takeru away from them. The members of Maken-ki return to their regular duties and daily lives.

==== Doki Doki! Maken-ki! Himitsu no Kunren ====
The series released a six-episode special from December 21, 2011, to May 25, 2012, to Blu-ray only, each lasting ten minutes long titled Doki Doki! Maken-ki! Himitsu no Kunren (ドキドキッ！マケン姫っ！秘密の訓練; lit. 'Heart-Pounding! Maken-ki! Secret Training'). The episodes feature a "personal fitness program" with the main female characters of the series. Secret training exercises include: sit-ups, squats, kendo, push-ups and hamstring stretches with Haruko Amaya; push-ups, glute raises, bridges, squats, and hip abduction and adduction with Inaho Kushiya; front lunges, leg raises, arm-leg cross raises, kneeling sit-ups and cross-legged stretches with Kodama Himegami; leg lifts while doing a plank, handstand push-ups against a wall, high kicks, squatting with a bear as a weight and leg raise stretches with Azuki Shinatsu; push-ups, squats, knee elbow lifts, reverse wrestler bridges and leg raise stretches with Syria Ootsuka; and thigh stretches lying down, shoulder and chest stretches lying down and standing up, sustained push-ups and glute raise stretches with Aki Nijou.

==== Maken-ki! OVA ====
No. overall	No. in season	Title	Original release date
13	OVA1	"It's Summer! It's Swimsuits! It's Training Camp! (Note: In Funimation's numbering of the series, Episode 13, "It's Summer! It's Swimsuits! It's Training Camp!", was part of season 1.)" "Natsu Da! Mizugi Da! Gasshuku Da!" (夏だ！水着だ！合宿だ！)	February 29, 2012
Takeru Ooyama, Haruko Amaya, Kodama Himegami, Inaho Kushiya, Kengo Usui, Azuki Shinatsu, Uruchi Minaya, Furan Takaki, Yuka Amato, Kimi Satō, Chacha Akaza, Minori Rokujou and Aki Nijou visit an island to prepare for the annual summer camp. While the others have fun in the sun, Takeru trains with Minori and Aki by wearing weighted wristbands. The next morning, Takeru finds out that the others have been captured by an octopus monster that absorbs their Element. After Syria Ootsuka suddenly appears and gets captured herself, Takeru unlocks his wristbands and uses Overblow in order to destroy the octopus monster and save the others. At night, Takeru, Haruko and Inaho have a run-in with a tree monster, first in the forest and then in a cavern. The others arrive and work together in order to destroy the tree monster once and for all. Unbeknownst to all of them, Otohime "The Manipulator" Yamato was responsible for creating the octopus monster and the tree monster.
14	OVA2	"Takeru Turns into a Woman!? Naked in a Southern Island!" "Takeru Nyotaika!? Minami no Shimadesu Po ~ n?" (タケル女体化！？ 南の島ですぽ～ん？)	September 30, 2013
The girls enjoy a "dynamite drink" in their log cabin during their slumber party, while Takeru and Kengo learn more about Minori and Aki. Takeru and Aki later fool around on a couch, but their fun is interrupted by Syria, who uses her Jingu, Inverse, which reverses natural states. This turns Takeru into a girl. In this form named Takeko, he uses this rare opportunity to socialize with the other girls. However, when he fondles Haruko in the middle of the night, Syria alerts the other girls about Takeko's true identity. This causes Haruko to destroy the roof of the log cabin out of rage. Syria informs the other girls that Takeru must receive a passionate kiss from a girl in order to turn back into a boy. When Inaho volunteers to kiss Takeru, Haruko suddenly pushes Takeru away, causing Takeru to be bumped into and kissed by the other girls until they decide to walk away in disgust without hearing his pleas for help. As Takeru wallows in despair, Haruko returns out of sympathy and kisses him on the cheek, thereby reverting Takeru to normal as he celebrates. A scene shows that Kengo turned into a girl as well.

==== Maken-ki! Two ====
No. overall	No. in season	Title	Original air date (Note: TV Tokyo used an after-midnight programming schedule for Maken-ki! Two, thus, the premiere episode was broadcast on January 15, 2014 at 25:30, which is the same as January 16, 2014 at 1:30 am JST. Dates in this article reflect the actual date.)
15	1	"Magical Security Organization" "Madō Kenkei Kikō" (魔導検警機構)	January 16, 2014
After Takeru Ooyama, Haruko Amaya, Kodama Himegami and Inaho Kushiya barely arrive to school on time, Kengo Usui informs them that a female student named Yumika Kinoshita fell victim to an elusive brassiere thief while in the restroom. Shortly after female students named Sakura Adachi and Saki Shinomiya fell victim while in the drama club dressing room, Furan Takaki and Yuka Amato assign the rest of the members of Maken-ki to catch this brassiere thief. By the seventh victim, Takeru deduces that the brassiere thief is stealing brassieres in ascending order of cup size. The girls use Takeru's theory to determine that the next victim will be either Haruko or Chacha Akaza. Haruko and Chacha are placed in the swimming pool dressing room, while the other girls guard the exits and the boys watch the schoolyard. Kengo is distracted by an adult magazine, and the brassiere thief impersonates him to get inside and hypnotize both Haruko and Chacha to do his bidding. However, Takeru arrives and eventually defeats the brassiere thief in his true appearance in order to save Haruko and Chacha. Minori Rokujou later receives a report from Furan that the brassiere thief has been apprehended.
16	2	"I Love Takeru-kun!" "Takeru Kimigasuki!" (タケル君が好き☆)	January 23, 2014
Mahiru Shimoyanagi, an alumnus of Tenbi Academy, uses her Maken, Eternal Emperor, an ability that manipulates air, in order to steal Haruko's memories along with Murakumo right before Takeru's eyes prior to escaping. Waking up in the school infirmary, an amnesiac Haruko openly professes her love for Takeru, which causes friction with Inaho until they compromise. Kengo, Azuki Shinatsu, Uruchi Minaya and Chacha are sent to track down Mahiru. Takeru shows Haruko a photo album of their childhood in a fail attempt to jog her memory. At night in his bedroom balcony, Takeru is told by the amnesiac Haruko that she lacked the courage to confess long ago, as she admits that this is the second time that she fell in love with him. At school the next day, Haruko transfers into Takeru's class, using her amnesia as an excuse to get closer to him. When a large explosion happens in the city, Azuki easily tracks down Mahiru and disarms her before retrieving Murakumo. Yuka forces Mahiru to surrender Haruko's memories by restrictive means. When her memories return, Haruko rejects and denies her own confession to Takeru.
17	3	"Meowken-ki?" "Nyaken Himetsu?" (ニャケン姫っ？)	January 30, 2014
Inaho brings Monji to school this time around. While the members of Maken-ki are trying to complete a large backlog of paperwork, Monji inexplicably uses an Element to give cat tails and cat ears on all the girls of Maken-ki including Aki Nijou, which leaves Takeru and Kengo to find a way to revert them to normal. The next day, Takeru and Kengo find the girls in heat due to entering the mating season for cats, especially when Haruko, Kodama and Inaho try to mate with Takeru. Luckily, Takeru snaps them out of their persistent behavior with water from a vase. When Monji has gone missing, Takeru and Inaho goes off to find him, while Haruko and Kodama try to stop the other girls and rein in their catlike antics. Takeru and Inaho search for Monji in the mountains, where he is found in the same valley that Inaho first met him at. With her catlike abilities, Inaho apologizes to Monji and all the girls revert to normal. However, the members of Maken-ki are dismayed upon realizing that the backlog of paperwork increased due to the incident.
18	4	"Man ♥ Cos" "Man (Hāto) Kosu" (まん（ハート）コス)	February 6, 2014
Takeru, Haruko, Inaho, Kengo and Azuki interrupt Kimi Satō and Chacha with Kodama in the student council room. Kimi and Chacha then explain that Tenbi Academy will be holding an upcoming manga festival, where students will sell amateur manga and do cosplay events. In order to finish her manga, Kimi has the other girls of Maken-ki model for her. Chacha finishes all the cosplaying costumes, while Kimi completes all her manga copies. On the day of the manga festival, Kimi's manga copies sell out and the girls of Maken-ki change into their costumes. However, the venue of the masquerade contest is struck by two perverted male students, who use their Maken to make manga characters come alive and hold girls captive in ropes. Though the masquerade contest is ruined, the members of Maken-ki manage to defeat all the manga characters and free the victims. Chacha and Kimi go after the two culprits and easily defeat them with their Maken, Compressor and Comic Star, in which they combine the abilities of changing the shape and density of objects while bringing drawings to reality. The two decide to enter the next event when the manga festival will be redone that year.
19	5	"Begging Teacher" "O Nedari ☆ Tīchā" (おねだり☆ティーチャー)	February 13, 2014
When Aki receives a call from her mother attempting another arranged marriage, a flustered Aki lies about having a boyfriend already, and she consequently has to send a picture of the boyfriend to her mother as proof. Takeru arrives at the school infirmary after getting hurt in Element practice, and Aki takes a picture with him to send to her mother. They both wake up inside a log cabin on an island handcuffed together with a restraint Element as a so-called gift by Aki's mother. She left a handwritten letter telling them that they have to endure all aspects of life for two days until a boat comes and picks them up. The two get rather close to each other, with the handcuffs forcing them to eat, bathe and sleep together. The next day, Takeru and Aki venture outside but seek shade under a tree when it starts to rain. When Takeru and Aki almost kiss, they are interrupted by Haruko and Kodama, who begin to question their motive. When Takeru tries to explain about the handcuffs, they suddenly vanish, making the situation look grim for him. Aki is later content with her short experience of having a boyfriend.
20	6	"Villainous Leadership Committee" "Gokuaku Mitsuru Sei Kai Tsu!" (極悪統生会っ！)	February 20, 2014
Furan and Yuka decide to select a candidate for the leadership committee from the first-year members. Uruchi gets selected to be a candidate, but she faces a lot of challenges that Yuka gives her during the study camp. She is immediately motivated to become the leadership committee vice president and serve under Haruko who she obsesses over. However, Uruchi's obsession with Haruko proves a distraction as well as a motivation throughout her study camp. Despite this, Uruchi succeeds in passing the study camp, but both Furan and Yuka believe that Uruchi is not ready because of her obsession. Furan and Yuka set Uruchi to the task of secretly following Haruko for a week and producing a detailed report on her. When Haruko plays with a puppet of Takeru, Uruchi realizes that Haruko loves the real Takeru, concluding that her feelings are unrequited. A regretful Uruchi immediately goes to withdraw her candidacy due to her selfishness and apparent immaturity, which convince Furan and Yuka that Uruchi is qualified to lead the leadership committee in the future.
21	7	"His Name is Rudolf!" "Sononawa Rudoru!" (その名はルドル！)	February 27, 2014
Kodama buys a German antique teddy bear, which she named Rudolf. Unfortunately, Rudolf is perverted and can speak. At first, Rudolf proves to be too much for Kodama to handle, as he gets his own way with Haruko and Inaho, who are unaware of his living nature. Kodama is unable to return Rudolf back to the shopkeeper, who refuses to accept Rudolf even for free. At the park, Rudolf tells Kodama that he did not enjoy life as an inanimate toy and wanted freedom. Distracting Kodama with the fake tragedy of his past, Rudolf escapes to have his own way with Aki. Kodama is called into an emergency case with the other members of Maken-ki to apprehend a vandal who can manipulate his Element in the form of a sledgehammer. When Kodama runs into the vandal, he easily overpowers her since she consumed all her Element previously attacking Rudolf. However, Rudolf comes to the rescue, calling upon the power of all teddy bears worldwide in order to defeat the vandal. Rudolf appears to die saving Kodama after his Element was consumed, though he is later shown to still be alive in the girls' bedroom in order to peep on them.
22	8	"Academy Harem" "Gakuen Hāremu" (学園ハーレム)	March 6, 2014
After hearing disparaging remarks about herself from some schoolgirls, Minori angrily quits her job as school principal. As a ploy, Minori purposely gives the job to Kengo in order to earn the appreciation of the female students. With an iron fist and a squad of male officers, Kengo immediately start causing problems for the schoolgirls in Tenbi Academy, especially when he personally visits various classrooms taught by Tomika Amato and Minori in order to enjoy his perverted policies being put into such awkward situations. Kengo abuses his authority to the extent of changing the syllabus and creating new school events. After Takeru joins Kengo's squad, the girls eventually become fed up with Kengo's authority, motivating them to stage a revolution and remove Kengo by force. Kodama has a strip rock paper scissors contest over the role of school principal, in which she wins against Kengo on each match. When Kengo loses on the last match, he immediately removes his red underwear, much to the horror of the crowd of students. A scene shows an elderly Kengo on his deathbed, who had a content vision of a devilish Kodama before he died.
23	9	"You Are More Manly Than Roses" "Kimi wa bara yori otokorashī" (君は薔薇より男らしい)	March 13, 2014
Furan falls in love with a person who helped her in the park when it rains, but this person is actually Azuki. As a girl, Azuki is forced by Yuka and the rest of the members of Maken-ki to cross-dress as "Kazuki" and date Furan. The other members of Maken-ki prepare Azuki in the hope to cure Furan's androphobia so that her first love is not the last one. When Azuki goes on a date with Furan, they travel by train and visit an arcade, a café and a wedding suite. Furan enjoys the date unlike Azuki. The next day, Azuki wants to confess to Furan about being the real identity of "Kazuki" at the park, but they are interrupted by a leader of a group of hooligans who previously attacked her and have now teamed up with a student who can manipulate his Element into binding ropes. Though Azuki is unable to defeat them all, Furan realizes that "Kazuki" was Azuki all along. Furan uses her Maken, Habaya, a bow that fires homing light arrows, in order to break the binding ropes and save Azuki. The following day, Furan returns to her normal self.
24	10	"And So, Toward Makenki" "Soshite, Makenki e" (そして、マケンキへ)	March 20, 2014
When Maken-ki was first established years ago, president Minori, secretary Aki and treasurer Tomiko forcefully recruit Gen Tagayashi to become their Makensmith. They witness Akaya Kodai picking a fight with Leo Hirata at the schoolyard. Although Minori tries to intervene, Akaya uses his Maken, Swindle, a six-bullet revolver, in order to put Leo to sleep. Minori fails to recruit Akaya into Maken-ki, even when important administrative documents are soon stolen from a safe in the principal's office. A burglar enters the principal's office, and the girls of Maken-ki intercept him and reveal that the safe was a decoy. The burglar is remotely rendered unconscious by his possessor. At the water fountain where the documents are hidden, Gen is joined by Akaya, who figures out that a shadow agent is using her shadow possession ability to take control of a female student named Nohana Saku. Minori, Aki and Tomiko arrive to release Nohana from the control of the shadow agent, and Minori is able to use her newly forged Maken, Dragon Ace, a glove that manipulates thermal energy, in order to defeat the shadow agent. As a result, Akaya agrees to join Maken-ki.

==== Maken-ki! Two Specials ====
Following the second season, the series released a five-episode special from March 28, 2014, to July 25, 2014, to Blu-ray/DVD only alongside pillowcases, each lasting five minutes long titled Maken-ki! Two Specials (マケン姫っ！通 P～私事). The episodes feature "never-before-seen footage" including: Haruko Amaya continuously fantasizing about Takeru Ooyama during her morning routine; Monji temporarily giving Inaho Kushiya a cat tail and cat ears during playtime; an unknown student fantasizing about Aki Nijou while in the school infirmary; Kodama Himegami trying on different outfits with Rudolf secretly watching; and Kimi Satō desiring a bigger bust size.

== Reception ==
Andy Hanley of UK Anime Network, in reviewing the first five episodes, found little originality in the anime series, which he called: "a cavalcade of tired old tropes and plot devices, from a visit to a hot springs to a 'date' where the couple are spied on by jealous friends, extending all the way out to the show's various characters and beyond."
