= Fuse Teppō Musume no Torimonochō =

Japanese name
- Kanji: 伏 鉄砲娘の捕物帳
Transcriptions
- Revised Hepburn: Fusé: Teppō Musume no Torimonochō
- Directed by: Masayuki Miyaji
- Screenplay by: Ichiro Okouchi
- Based on: Fuse Gansaku: Satomi Hakkenden by Kazuki Sakuraba; Nansō Satomi Hakkenden by Kyokutei Bakin
- Produced by: Yōsuke Tsuruki; Kazuaki Takahashi; Masayuki Otsuka
- Edited by: Kumiko Sakamoto
- Music by: Michiru Oshima
- Production company: TMS Entertainment
- Distributed by: Tokyo Theatre (Japan) NIS America (USA)
- Release date: October 20, 2012 (Japan)
- Running time: 110 minutes
- Country: Japan
- Language: Japanese

Fusé: Memoirs of the Hunter Girl (伏 鉄砲娘の捕物帳, Fusé: Teppō Musume no Torimonochō), also known as Fuse: A Gun Girl's Detective Story and Fusé: Memoirs of the Huntress, is a 2012 Japanese animated film directed by Masayuki Miyaji based on Kazuki Sakuraba's novel Fusé Gansaku: Satomi Hakkenden. Both novel and film are adaptations of Kyokutei Bakin's epic novel Nansō Satomi Hakkenden, focusing on a female hunter named Hamaji.

== Plot ==
Hamaji is a girl who lives alone in the mountains, surviving as a hunter just like her grandfather. One day she receives a letter from her brother Dousetsu who lives in Edo. Reaching the big city, she gets lost and ends up meeting Shino, a fusé who helps her in finding her brother's house. Dousetsu wants to team up with her to win a bounty award to hunt down the fusé, which are people who are part wolf and part human that eat other people's essence. With her hunting skills she finds and kills a beautiful female fusé and she and her brother share in a huge reward. However, this distraughts Shino, which prompts him to execute his plan of hunting down Edo's shogun and kill him in order to avenge his fusé kin. Later, Hamaji and Shino form a connection that enables him to escape from Edo and accept his situation.

== Characters ==
=== Main ===
Shino (信乃, Shino)
Voiced by: Mamoru Miyano
One of the last remaining fusé who is also a famous kabuki theater actor. Behind the curtains, he secretly attacks fusé hunters in order to avenge his dead kin. While Hamaji is aware of his identity of being a fusé, he constantly holds his urge to eat her human essence.
Hamaji Ooyama (大山 浜路, Ooyama Hamaji)
Voiced by: Minako Kotobuki
A young girl who lived in the mountains alone, following her grandfather's footsteps of being a hunter. She later receives a letter from her brother, prompting her to go to the city of Edo and cross paths with Shino.

=== Secondary ===
Dousetsu Ooyama (大山 道節, Ooyama Dōsetsu)
Voiced by: Katsuyuki Konishi
Hamaji's brother and a fusé hunter.
Meido (冥土, Meido)
Voiced by: Kanako Miyamoto
Hamaji's author friend whom she met after Meido published printings about her fusé hunt.
Funamushi (船虫, Funamushi)
Voiced by: Maaya Sakamoto
Dousetsu's wife.
Iesada Tokugawa (徳川 家定, Tokugawa Iesada)
Voiced by: Nojima Hirofumi
Based on the historical figure Tokugawa Iesada, he is a shogun with an unhealthy obsession of hunting down fusé.
Itezuru (凍鶴, Itezuru)
Voiced by: Nana Mizuki
Edo's top courtesan and Shino's acquaintance who is secretly a fusé. Hamaji and Dousetsu later hunt her down, with Dousetsu being the one to cut her head off.
Makuwari (馬加, Makuwari)
Voiced by: Kamiya Hiroshi
A fuse hunter with a fake fusé eye and a bloodlust for hunting their heads for bounty.

=== Supporting ===
Bakin Takizawa (滝沢 馬琴, Takizawa Bakin)
Voiced by: Katsura Utamaru
Based on the historical author Kyokutei Bakin, who wrote the original epic novel Nansō Satomi Hakkenden which the film was based on.
Yoshirou (世四郎, Yoshirō)
Voiced by: Hitori Gekidan
Koujou (口上, Kōjō)
Voiced by: Atsushi Abe
Zanzou (残三, Zanzō)
Voiced by: Rokurō Naya
Aboji (網乾, Aboji)
Voiced by: Hideyuki Umezu
Daikaku (大角, Daikaku)
Voiced by: Kenji Hamada
Juushoku (住職, Jūshoku)
Voiced by: Naoto Takenaka
Hyakka Shōten Shopkeeper (百花商店店主, Hyakka Shōten Tenshu)
Voiced by: Keiji Fujiwara

== Media ==
A special Blu-ray and DVD set was released featuring cover art by graphic designer Wakamatsu Kaori. It also included a booklet and postcard set by the same designer. NIS America later licensed the film and received the English-subtitled film in a Premium Edition on May 6, 2014. Anime Limited has licensed the film for the British Isles and will release the movie on Blu-ray in 2022.
