= Kazuki Sakuraba =

Japanese writer

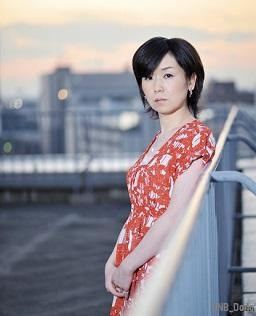
- Born: July 26, 1971 (age 55); Shimane Prefecture, Japan
- Occupation: Writer
- Writing career
- Language: Japanese
- Genres: Fiction, light novel, crime fiction
- Notable works: Gosick series, Red Girls: The Legend of the Akakuchibas
- Notable awards: Mystery Writers of Japan Award (2007); Naoki Prize (2007)

Kazuki Sakuraba (桜庭 一樹, Sakuraba Kazuki) is a Japanese author of novels and light novels, and Naoki Prize winner.

== Biography ==
Sakuraba was born in Shimane Prefecture on the 26th of July 1971. She, however, grew up in Yonago, Tottori Prefecture.

She started writing novels when she was in the fourth or fifth grade of elementary school. In the library, Sakuraba often met a girl who she befriended that was writing something like a novel, so she decided to do the same, writing her first novel in her notebook.

During her junior and senior high school years, Sakuraba skipped classes and cram school to read books. She states that she was seemingly unable to and hated studying. She graduated from Yonago Higashi High School and moved to Tokyo for university. During university, she repeatedly tried but failed to write anything substantial. Sakuraba continued to read books however and had a part-time job.

In 1993, she won the DENiM New Writer's Award. In 1999, Sakuraba's novel Yozora ni, Manten no Hoshi (later retitled Loneliness Guardian: AD2015 Isolated Town) received an honorable mention in the 1st Famitsu Entertainment Award in the novel category. Novelist Usagi Nakamura was on the selection committee and recommended the work, barely making the selection and allowing Sakuraba to debut. After her debut, there was a period of stagnation where Sakuraba did not publish much and the work she did publish did not sell well.

In 2003, Sakuraba made her first big break with the light novel series Gosick. In addition, her novels Suitei Shōjo and A Lollypop or A Bullet published in 2004 were highly acclaimed, and in 2005, her novel Shōjo ni wa Mukanai Shokugyō attracted attention as her first work for the general public.

In 2007, she won the 60th Mystery Writers of Japan Award in the long and serial short story category for her work Red Girls: The Legend of the Akakuchibas published in 2006. The same work was nominated for the 28th Eiji Yoshikawa Literary Newcomer Award. In 2008, she won the 138th Naoki Prize for her novel Watashi no Otoko.

== Works in English translation ==
Gosick series

- Gosick, Volume 1 (Tokyopop. 2008. ISBN 9781427805690)
- Gosick, Volume 2: The Crime That Has No Name (Tokyopop. 2010. ISBN 9781427805706)

Other

- Red Girls: The Legend of the Akakuchibas (original title: Akakuchiba-ke no Densetsu), translated Jocelyne Allen (Haikasoru, 2015)

== Awards and nominations ==
Japanese Awards

- 2007 – Mystery Writers of Japan Award for Best Novel: Red Girls: The Legend of the Akakuchibas
- 2007 – Nominee for Yoshikawa Eiji Prize for New Writers: Red Girls: The Legend of the Akakuchibas
- 2007 – Nominee for Naoki Prize: Red Girls: The Legend of the Akakuchibas
- 2007 – Naoki Prize: Watashi no Otoko (My Man)

U.S. Awards

- 2016 – Longlisted for the 2015 James Tiptree, Jr. Award: Red Girls: The Legend of the Akakuchibas

== Bibliography ==
=== Gosick series ===
Books in the GOSICK series up to GOSICKs III were published originally by Fujimi Mystery Bunko; the publishing dates listed correspond to this printing. Between September 2009 and January 2011, these books were republished by Kadokawa Bunko. From February to November 2011 they were then republished by Kadokawa Beans Bunko. Starting with GOSICK VII the books have been published by Kadokawa Bunko exclusively.

Royalties from the first edition printing of GOSICK VII were donated to the Japanese Red Cross to aid victims of the 2011 Tōhoku earthquake and tsunami.

Year	Japanese Title	English Title	Publisher	ISBN
2003	GOSICK -ゴシック- Goshikku	GOSICK -Gosick-	Fujimi Mystery Bunko; Kadokawa Bunko; Kadokawa Beans Bunko	ISBN 4-8291-6229-5; ISBN 978-4-04-428106-9; ISBN 978-4-04-428116-8
2004	GOSICK II -ゴシック・その罪は名もなき- Goshikku: Sono Tsumi wa Namonaki	GOSICK II -Gosick: Those Sins are Nameless-	Fujimi Mystery Bunko; Kadokawa Bunko; Kadokawa Beans Bunko	ISBN 4-8291-6254-6; ISBN 978-4-04-428107-6; ISBN 978-4-04-428117-5
2004	GOSICK III -ゴシック・青い薔薇の下で- Goshikku: Aoi Bara no Shita de	GOSICK III -Gosick: Beneath the Blue Rose-	Fujimi Mystery Bunko; Kadokawa Bunko; Kadokawa Beans Bunko	ISBN 4-8291-6273-2; ISBN 978-4-04-428108-3; ISBN 978-4-04-428118-2
2005	GOSICK IV -ゴシック・愚者を代弁せよ- Goshikku: Kuja o Daiben Seyo	GOSICK IV -Gosick: Speaking on Behalf of Fools-	Fujimi Mystery Bunko; Kadokawa Bunko; Kadokawa Beans Bunko	ISBN 4-8291-6288-0; ISBN 978-4-04-428110-6; ISBN 978-4-04-428122-9
2005	GOSICKs -ゴシックエス・春来たる死神- Goshikkuesu: Haru Kitaru Shinigami	GOSICKs -Gosicks: The Death God that Came with Spring-	Fujimi Mystery Bunko; Kadokawa Bunko; Kadokawa Beans Bunko	ISBN 4-8291-6310-0; ISBN 978-4-04-428109-0; ISBN 978-4-04-428120-5
2005	GOSICK V -ゴシック・ベルゼブブの頭蓋- Goshikku: Beruzebubu no Zugai	GOSICK V -Gosick: Belzebub's Skull-	Fujimi Mystery Bunko; Kadokawa Bunko; Kadokawa Beans Bunko	ISBN 4-8291-6328-3; ISBN 978-4-04-428111-3; ISBN 978-4-04-428125-0
2006	GOSICKs II -ゴシックエス・夏から遠ざかる列車- Goshikkuesu: Natsu kara Toozakaru Ressha	GOSICKs II -Gosicks: The Train Moving Away From Summer-	Fujimi Mystery Bunko; Kadokawa Bunko; Kadokawa Beans Bunko	ISBN 4-8291-6352-6; ISBN 978-4-04-428112-0; ISBN 978-4-04-428123-6
2006	GOSICK VI -ゴシック・仮面舞踏会の夜- Goshikku: Kamen Butōkai no Yoru	GOSICK VI -Gosick: The Night of the Masquerade Ball-	Fujimi Mystery Bunko; Kadokawa Bunko; Kadokawa Beans Bunko	ISBN 4-8291-6375-5; ISBN 978-4-04-428113-7; ISBN 978-4-04-428126-7
2007	GOSICKs III -ゴシックエス・秋の花の思い出- Goshikuesu: Aki no Hana no Omoide	GOSICKs III -Gosicks: Memories of Autumn Flowers-	Fujimi Mystery Bunko; Kadokawa Bunko; Kadokawa Beans Bunko	ISBN 978-4-8291-6387-0; ISBN 978-4-04-428114-4; ISBN 978-4-04-100048-9
2011	GOSICK VII -ゴシック・薔薇色の人生- Goshikku: Barairo no Jinsei	GOSICK VII -Gosick: Rose Coloured Life-	Kadokawa Bunko	ISBN 978-4-04-428115-1
2011	GOSICKs IV -ゴシックエス・冬のサクリファイス- Goshikkuesu: Fuyu no Sakurifaisu	GOSICKs IV -Gosicks: Winter's Sacrifice-	Kadokawa Bunko	ISBN 978-4-04-428119-9
2011	GOSICK VIII -ゴシック・神々の黄昏- Goshikku: Kamigami no Tasogare	GOSICK VIII -Gosick: Twilight of the Gods-	Kadokawa Bunko	First volume: ISBN 978-4-04-428121-2; Second volume: ISBN 978-4-04-428124-3

=== Other light novels ===
Year	Japanese Title	English Title	Publisher	ISBN
1999	ロンリネス・ガーティアン AD2015隔離都市; Ronrinesu Gādian AD2015 Kakuri Toshi	Loneliness Guardian: AD2015 Isolated Town	Famitsū Bunko	ISBN 4-7572-0619-4
2001	ルナティック・ドリーマー; Runatikku Dorīmā	Lunatic Dreamer	EX Novels	ISBN 4-7575-0601-5
2002	Girl's Guard 君の歌は僕の歌; Girl's Guard: Kimi no Uta wa Boku no Uta	Girl's Guard: Your Song Is My Song	Famitsū Bunko	ISBN 4-7577-0710-X
2002	B-EDGE AGE 獅子たちはアリスの庭で; B-EDGE AGE: Shishi-tachi wa Arisu no Niwa de	B-EDGE AGE: The Shishi Are in Alice's Garden	Fujimi Mystery Bunko	ISBN 4-8291-6167-1
2002	B-EDGE AGE 獅子たちはノアの方舟で; B-EDGE AGE: Shishi-tachi wa Noa no Hakobune de	B-EDGE AGE: The Shishi Are in Noah's Ark	Fujimi Mystery Bunko	ISBN 4-8291-6186-8
2002	竹田くんの恋人; Takeda-kun no Koibito	Takeda-kun's Lover	Kadokawa Sneaker Bunko	ISBN 4-04-428101-7
2003	赤×ピンク; Aka × Pinku	Red × Pink	Famitsū Bunko	ISBN 4-7577-1283-9
2004	推定少女; Suitei Shōjo	Presumptuous Girl	Famitsū Bunko	ISBN 4-7577-1995-7
2004	砂糖菓子の弾丸は撃ちぬけない; Satōgashi no Dangan wa Uchinukenai	A Lollypop or A Bullet (lit. Candy Bullets Can't Hit Anything)	Fujimi Mystery Bunko	ISBN 4-8291-6276-7
2005	荒野の恋 第一部 catch the tail Kōya no Koi Dai Ichi Bu catch the tail	Love of the Wilderness, Volume One: catch the tail	Famitsū Bunko	ISBN 4-7577-2289-3
2006	荒野の恋 第二部 bump of love Kōya no Koi Dai Ni Bu bump of love	Love of the Wilderness, Volume Two: bump of love	Famitsū Bunko	ISBN 4-7577-2604-X

=== Mainstream novels ===
Sakuraba's mainstream novels have been released by a variety of publishers. The bulk of them have also been rereleased several years after their original publishing dates by different publishers.

Red Girls: The Legend of the Akakuchibas was the winner of the 60th Mystery Writers of Japan Award in 2007, and Watashi no Otoko (My Man) won the 138th Naoki Prize in the latter half of the same year.

Year	Japanese Title	English Title	Publisher	ISBN
2005	少女には向かない職業; Shōjo ni wa Mukanai Shokugyō	An Unsuitable Job for a Girl	Tōkyō Sōgensha Mystery Frontier; Sōgensuiri Bunko	ISBN 4-488-01719-3; ISBN 978-4-488-47201-6
2005	ブルースカイ; Burū Sukai	Blue Sky	Hayakawa Bunko JA Bunshun Bunko	ISBN 4-15-030820-9; ISBN 978-4-15-031028-8; ISBN 978-4-16-778405-8
2006	少女七竈と七人の可愛そうな大人; Shōjo Nanakamodo to Shichinin no Kawaisō na Otona	Girl Rowans and Seven People Make Cute Adults	Kadokawa Shoten; Kadokawa Bunko	ISBN 4-04-873700-7; ISBN 978-4-04-428105-2
2006	赤朽葉家の伝説; Akakuchiba-ke no Densetsu	Red Girls: The Legend of the Akakuchibas	Tōkyō Sōgensha; Sōgensuiri Bunko	ISBN 4-488-02393-2; ISBN 978-4-488-47202-3
2007	青年のための読書クラブ; Seishun no Tame no Dokusha Kurabu	Reading Club for the Sake of Youth	Shinchosha; Shinchō Bunko	ISBN 978-4-10-304951-7; ISBN 978-4-10-135681-5
2007	私の男; Watashi no Otoko	My Man	Bungeishunjū; Bunshun Bunko	ISBN 978-4-16-326430-1; ISBN 978-4-16-778401-0
2008	ファミリーポートレイト; Famirī Pōtoreito	Family Portrait	Kodansha	ISBN 978-4-06-215132-0; ISBN 978-4-06-277062-0
2009	製鉄天使; Seitetsu Tenshi	Blacksmith Angel	Tōkyō Sōgensha	ISBN 978-4-488-02450-5
2010	道徳という名の少年; Dōtoku to Iu Na no Shōnen	A Boy Named Moral	Kadokawa Shoten	ISBN 978-4-04-874058-6
2010	伏 贋作・里見八犬伝; Fuse Gansaku: Satomi Hakkenden	The Fake Fuse: Satomi Hakkenden	Bungeishunjū	ISBN 978-4-16-329760-6
2011	ばらばら死体の夜; Barabara Shitai no Yoru	Night of the Scattered Corpse	Shueisha	ISBN 978-4-08-771402-9
2012	傷痕; Kizuato	Scar	Kodansha	ISBN 978-4-06-217459-6

=== Anthologized works ===
In addition to her full-length works, Sakuraba has contributed short stories to a number of literary anthologies.

Year	Japanese Title	English Title	Anthologized In	ISBN
2005	暴君; Bōkun	Tyrant	Igyō Korekushon: Obakeyashiki 異形コレクション・オバケヤシキ; Grotesque Collection: Haunted House	ISBN 978-4334739317
2006	脂肪遊戯; Shibō Yūgi	Blubber Games	Igyō Korekushon: Yami Denwa 『異形コレクション・闇電話; Grotesque Collection: Dark Phone	ISBN 978-4334740665
2006	少年バンコラン！ 夜歩く犬; Shōnen Bankoran! Yoru Aruku Inu	Boy Bencolin! Night Walking Dog	Misshitsu to Kiseki: J.D. Kā Seitan Hyakunen Kinen Ansorojī 密室と奇蹟 J・D・カー生誕百周年記念アンソロジー; Locked Rooms and Miracles: J.D. Carr Hundred Year Anniversary Anthology	ISBN 978-4488023928
2008	ライティング; Raitingu	Lighting	Sakuraba Kazuki: Monogataru Shōjo to Yajū 桜庭一樹 物語る少女と野獣; Kazuki Sakuraba: To Tell of Girls and Beasts	ISBN 978-4048738750
2009	A A	A	Mijikai Nemurinitsuku Mae ni III みじかい眠りにつく前にIII; A While Before You Sleep III	ISBN 978-4861766824

=== Essay collections ===
Aside from her works of fiction, Sakuraba has written a number of essays that have been compiled into collection. Her first essay collection, Nidaime no Baka ni Tsukeru Kusuri, was published under the masculine pen name Sakuramaru Yamada (山田桜丸, Yamada Sakuramaru).

Year	Japanese Title	English Title	Publisher	ISBN
1996	二代目のバカにつける薬; Nidaime no Baka ni Tsukeru Kusuri	Remedies for a Second Generation Fool	Ihatov Shuppan	ISBN 4-900779-08-3
2006	桜庭一樹日記 BLACK AND WHITE; Sakuraba Kazuki Nikki: BLACK AND WHITE	Kazuki Sakuraba Diary: BLACK AND WHITE	Fujimi Shobo	ISBN 4-8291-7610-5
2007	桜庭一樹読書日記 少年になり、本を買うのだ。 Sakuraba Kazuki Dokusha Nikki: Shōnen ni Nari, Hon o Kau no da.	Kazuki Sakuraba Reading Diary: If I Was a Boy, I Would Buy Books.	Tōkyō Sōgensha; Sōgen Library	ISBN 978-4-488-02395-9; ISBN 978-4-488-07064-9
2008	書店はタイムマシーン 桜庭一樹読書日記; Shoten wa Taimu Mashīn: Sakuraba Kazuki Dokusha Nikki	Bookstores are Time Machines: Kazuki Sakuraba Reading Diary	Tōkyō Sōgensha	ISBN 978-4-488-02435-2
2009	お好みの本、入荷しました 桜庭一樹読書日記; Okonomi no Hon, Nyūkashimashita: Sakuraba Kazuki Dokusha Nikki	My Favourite Books Have Arrived: Kazuki Sakuraba Reading Diary	Tōkyō Sōgensha	ISBN 978-4-488-02452-9

== TV and film adaptations ==
TV anime

- Gosick (2011)

Anime films

- Fuse Teppō Musume no Torimonochō (2012)

Live action films

- Girl's Blood (2014)
- My Man (2014)
