= Gosick =

Japanese light novel series

- Cover of Gosick volume 1 as published by Fujimi Shobo featuring the two protagonists, Victorique de Blois and Kazuya Kujō

ゴシック (Goshikku)
- Genre: Mystery, Historical, Romance
- Light novel
- Written by: Kazuki Sakuraba
- Illustrated by: Hinata Takeda
- Published by: Fujimi Shobo
- English publisher: NA: Tokyopop (formerly)
- Imprint: Fujimi Mystery Bunko
- Original run: December 10, 2003 – July 23, 2011
- Volumes: 9
- Light novel

GosickS
- Written by: Kazuki Sakuraba
- Illustrated by: Hinata Takeda
- Published by: Kadokawa Shoten
- Imprint: Kadokawa Beans Bunko
- Original run: July 15, 2005 – May 25, 2011
- Volumes: 4
- Manga
- Written by: Kazuki Sakuraba
- Illustrated by: Sakuya Amano
- Published by: Fujimi Shobo
- Magazine: Monthly Dragon Age
- Original run: January 2008 – May 2012
- Volumes: 8
- Manga

Gosick W
- Written by: Kazuki Sakuraba
- Illustrated by: Moriki Takeshi
- Published by: Kadokawa Shoten
- Magazine: Comp Ace
- Original run: January 2011 – December 2011
- Anime television series
- Directed by: Hitoshi Nanba
- Produced by: Junka Kobayashi; Yoshikazu Beniya
- Written by: Mari Okada
- Music by: Kōtarō Nakagawa
- Studio: Bones
- Licensed by: Crunchyroll: AUS: Madman Entertainment
- Original network: TV Tokyo, TVA, TVO, TSC, TVQ, AT-X
- Original run: January 7, 2011 – July 2, 2011
- Episodes: 24
- Novel series

Gosick New Continent
- Written by: Kazuki Sakuraba
- Published by: Kadokawa Shoten
- Original run: December 25, 2013 – December 2, 2016
- Volumes: 4
- icon

Gosick (Japanese: ゴシック, Hepburn: Goshikku; stylized as GOSICK, derived from the word gothic) is a Japanese light novel series written by Kazuki Sakuraba, with illustrations by Hinata Takeda. The series includes 13 novels published by Fujimi Shobo between December 2003 and July 2011. Set in a fictional European country in 1924, a Japanese exchange student meets a mysterious, brilliant girl who only leaves the library to sleep. Her brother, a detective, relies on her exceptional mind to solve difficult mysteries. Tokyopop released the first two novels in English in North America. A manga adaptation drawn by Sakuya Amano was serialized in Fujimi Shobo's Monthly Dragon Age magazine. A 24-episode anime adaptation by Bones aired between January and July 2011. A collection of side stories titled GosickS was published between 2005 and 2011, while a sequel novel series named Gosick New Continent was released in between 2013 and 2016.

== Plot and settings ==
Gosick takes place in 1924 in a small, French-speaking fictional European country; which stretches from Switzerland, through the Alps between France and Italy, to the Mediterranean Sea. The country is called "Sauville" (ソヴュール王国, sovyūru ōkoku) in the light novels and "Saubureme" (ソヴレム, sovuremu) is Sauville's capital in the anime adaptation. The story centers on Kazuya Kujo, the third son of a high-ranking officer of the Imperial Japanese Army, who is a transfer student to St. Marguerite Academy, where urban legends and horror stories are popular. There he meets Victorique de Blois, a mysterious yet beautiful and brilliant girl who never comes to class and spends her days reading the entire contents of the library or solving mysteries that even detectives can not solve. The early episodes mostly focus on Kazuya and Victorique getting involved in different criminal cases and their struggle to solve them, at the same time forming important bonds with different people and each other. However, as the series advances, the tenebrous background of Victorique and her family comes back to haunt her.

Its sequel series, Gosick New Continent, takes place in 1931 in New York City, where Victorique and Kazuya are a couple and own a small detective agency. It's revealed that Kazuya's father did not accept his bond with Victorique, so they fled to the United States to be together with the help of his sister Ruri. The World Wars belong to the past now, but the pair's peace is shattered by a new party that seeks to get their hands on Victorique.

== Characters ==
=== Main characters ===
Victorique de Blois (ヴィクトリカ・ド・ブロワ, Vikutorika do Burowa; French pronunciation: [viktɔʁik də blwa])
Voiced by: Chiwa Saito (Drama CD), Aoi Yuuki (Anime) (Japanese); Apphia Yu (English)
Victorique has the appearance of a small (in the novel 140 cm, 4'7"), almost doll-like, girl with very long blonde hair and emerald eyes and a voice that sounds beyond her age. She is portrayed as a typical tsundere. Another important part of Victorique's appearance is a ceramic smoking pipe that she uses for dramatic effect when thinking. She spends her days in the conservatory at the top of the library, reading several difficult books, often in different languages, simultaneously. She points at one entire wall of the library and told Kazuya that she has read almost all the books over there. Along with her sharp tongue, abusive bluntness and eccentric attitude, she possesses a genius level intellect which she applies to observing facts and "reconstructing chaos". The examples shown in the novels and anime are solving inexplicable crimes and false accusations. The credit for solving such crimes is often given to her half brother, Det. Grevil de Blois, to hide Victorique's involvement.
After Victorique saves him from an arrest, Kazuya finds himself entangled in every new mystery that occurs. Because her mother, Cordelia Gallo, was a mistress, and according to Victorique "a dangerous person", she was imprisoned in the depths of the de Blois mansion where she developed mannerisms that are anything but childlike. She was allowed to attend school under strict orders from her father to never leave the campus. Only in exceptional circumstances does she obtain permission to leave, usually with Grevil having obtained it for her from their family. When she first met Kazuya she did not like him and thought that he was annoying and stupid for climbing up all the stairs in the library. She even ignored him and made fun of him, but gradually warmed up to him and began to trust and cherish him. Despite acting harshly towards Kazuya almost all the time, it's clear that she cares deeply for him, as seen many times when he is in danger. In novel volume 1 chapter 1 she tells Kazuya "My five senses are on high alert, gathering fragments of chaos from the world around me. The fountain of knowledge inside me toys with them out of sheer boredom, reconstructing them. I may verbalize this; often times I can't be bothered and remain silent." She often complains about boredom being the root of her headaches. Throughout the anime, Victorique was also called by others as the "Golden Fairy in the High Tower", "Gray Wolf" and at the end of the series "Charming Monster" or "Monster Charmante" from the French translation; all of them creatures of folktales.

After the events in Sauville during the war, Victorique's golden hair turns silver and reunites with Kazuya in 1929 when he returns to Japan from fighting in the war. In novel continuity, they then move to United States and open the Grey Wolf Detective Agency, getting married in 1934 after the events of Gosick New Continent. In the anime, their future marriage is only implied through a vision of her wearing wedding dress during the epilogue.
Victorique's name is spelled "Victorica" on the official Gosick website, likely as a phonetic spelling. Her name is spelled "Victorique" in the first two novels (English translation) and in episode 9 of the anime. All evidences in novel and anime indicates that the nation of Sauville, the academy and the de Blois all speak French as their official language. In the novels, it is noted that her name is apparently usually a man's, as Avril initially does not believe Victorique is a female student when she is being discussed.

Kazuya Kujo (久城 一弥, Kujō Kazuya)
Voiced by: Miyu Irino (Drama CD), Takuya Eguchi (Anime) (Japanese); Matt Shipman (English)
As the youngest son of a soldier, Kazuya has spent most of his life struggling with living in his highly successful siblings' shadows. Jealous of all the attention his brothers got, he worked hard to compete, but everything changed when he understood that adults, who think that the youngest child is always spoiled and useless, will never acknowledge his efforts. With a permanent scar in his heart he left the military academy in Japan and before anyone from his family could stop him, went to study abroad at St. Marguerite. Unfortunately, his black-hair and dark brown eyes, combined with the campus legend saying that "the traveler who comes in the spring brings death with him" has resulted in Kazuya being called the "Black Reaper" by the largely apprehensive and superstitious student body, resulting in him having no friends. By some twist of fate he becomes a messenger and companion to the most eccentric pupil in the school, Victorique. At first he didn't like Victorique because of her arrogant and sadistic attitude, but after spending time with her, he started to truly care for her and be protective of her. It is shown that he is willing to risk his life to protect her on more than one occasion. He is described, by Victorique, as a good and sincere person whose soul is pure and beautiful enough to admit pride. Although he claims to have excellent academic achievements that rival that of his older brothers, he can be very dense and slow, though he has a keen memory for details when applying it to a crime. Despite everything that happened in Japan he is proud to be a soldier's son.
After the beginning of the World War II, Kazuya becomes an interpreter for the Japanese army thanks to his knowledge of languages. He spends time as a prisoner of war and receives permanent damage on his leg (in the anime, he becomes a soldier instead and is apparently not wounded), but he returns to reunite with Victorique in 1929. In Gosick New Continent, Victorique and Kazuya move to New York and open the Grey Wolf Detective Agency, although Kazuya also finds a second job as an apprentice reporter for the tabloid newspaper Daily Road. They get married in 1934.

=== Other characters ===
Grevil de Blois (グレヴィール・ド・ブロワ, Gurevīru do Burowa)
Voiced by: Takehito Koyasu (Drama CD), Hidenobu Kiuchi (Anime) (Japanese); Adam Rowe (English)
Grevil is an aristocrat who had forced the local police to make him a detective purely because he had an interest in crime. The most noticeable aspect of his appearance is his drill-like hairstyle that Kazuya is convinced could be used as a deadly weapon. In the light novels he smokes a pipe identical to Victorique's. This isn't shown in the anime. Being a terrible detective, he relies on Victorique to solve his cases. All the same, he has some talent, at least as an actor, as shown when making an arrest in novel volume 1 chapter 5 part 1. Despite that, Victorique is never acknowledged for her efforts because she must not be made known to the public.
Grevil is the half-brother of Victorique sharing the same father; Marquis Albert du Blois. Grevil's mother was Albert's wife while Victorique's mother was a mistress. It is revealed that he was in love with his childhood friend Jacqueline. Unfortunately, at that time she was already married. Grevil, with assistance from Victorique, solved a case and acquitted Jacqueline of an accusation (framed) of murder. While he is described by Victorique as a heel and a playboy, it is implied that his current happy self is nothing but a shell to bury his sad past, including losing Jacqueline to someone else and not being able to show his concern for his sister openly.

It is mentioned in episode 10 that his shocking drill-like hairstyle is actually the price he pays for asking Victorique to solve Jacqueline's case, while citing that if Victorique wanted to make his life truly miserable, she should have asked him to stop loving Jacqueline instead of merely asking him to don such a ridiculous hairstyle. He originally had a charming long hairstyle, and at the end of the series he restores this old hairstyle.
Gosick New Continent reveals that, after World War II, Grevil left his job in the police and became an actor.

Avril Bradley (アブリル・ブラッドリー, Aburiru Buraddorī)
Voiced by: Tomoko Kawakami (Drama CD), Noriko Shitaya (Anime) (Japanese); Erica Mendez (English)
An international student from Great Britain. Because she and Kazuya are both foreign students, they quickly found common ground and were able to talk freely, instead of treating Kazuya like a monster, which is what most of the rest of the students are doing. She is a beautiful girl with short blond hair and blue eyes. It is hinted that she has feelings for Kazuya. She represents Kazuya's ordinary ties to the school, apart from his adventures with Victorique. She also enjoys eating and is fond of ghost stories. Through the first novel she has not met Victorique.
In the light novel and anime, the real Avril Bradley was kidnapped on the way to the academy and replaced by Keiran II, the successor of the famous thief Keiran who mysteriously disappeared eight years prior. This thief wishes to continue his legacy by stealing the priceless works of famous artists and writers, etc., and was after a rare stamp that Avril's grandfather, a famed adventurer, had intended to give to her. She was rescued by Kujo, and later in the nurse's office said she thought he was a "black-haired prince". Ironically, because the thief knew of the real Avril in detail and had been a very good imposter, it wasn't hard for Kazuya to reestablish a friendship with the real Avril, who even developed feelings for him, but has a hard time trying to get closer to him due to his dedication to Victorique. In episode 14, she confessed her love for Kujo to Victorique but Victorique left before she can hear Avril's confession.

Cecile Lafitte (セシル・ラフィット, Seshiru Rafitto)
Voiced by: Yui Horie (Drama CD), Yui Kano (Anime), Kristen McGuire (English)
A teacher in St. Marguerite Academy. She teaches Kazuya's, Avril's (and Victorique's) class. A small woman with a baby face, fluffy brown hair and big round glasses. She tasks Kazuya with taking the class handouts to Victorique, and she was the one who first brought Kazuya and Victorique together. She also dislikes ghosts and is prone to fainting in certain supernatural situations.
Brian Roscoe (ブライアン・ロスコー, Buraian Rosukō)
Voiced by: Tōru Ōkawa (Anime), Robert McCollum (English)
A famous magician whom Kujo regularly encounters. After Victorique proves Cordelia Gallo's innocence, he is seen beside Cordelia commenting that her "sin" has been burned together with the only bridge connecting the Grey Wolves' village to the outside world. During the First World War, he used his capabilities as an illusionist, along with a magic lantern, to disrupt a German bombing run on the "Beelzebub's Skull" convent in Lithuania – a huge projection of the Virgin Mary. He was the one who helped Cordelia escape from the sanitarium she was left in by Albert after Victorique's birth. Since then they have been working together to oppose the Marquis' intentions.
Later is revealed that Brian is not a single individual, but a pair of identical twins who share the same appearance and name. Both care deeply for Cordelia, but one of the twins despises Victorique as her birth prevented Cordelia from returning those feelings.

Cordelia Gallo (コルデリア・ギャロ, Koruderia Gyaro)
Voiced by: Miyuki Sawashiro (Anime), Elizabeth Maxwell (English)
Victorique's mother, who hails from the legendary "Village of the Gray Wolves", a secluded castle town (later stated to actually be a small independent kingdom by the village elder.) inhabited by people who all possess the same physical and mental attributes – short stature, pale skin, blond hair, green eyes, and extremely high intelligence. It is also shown that they develop precognitive abilities in old age. She was expelled from the town after being framed for the murder of the then-current elder, and her whereabouts were a mystery until Victorique manages to prove her innocence, when she is seen beside Brian Roscoe.
Cordelia's resemblance to her daughter is uncanny, and her short stature even as an adult leads even Kujo to mistake Cordelia for Victorique when he sees her. It is eventually revealed that Cordelia never had any kind of relationship with Victorique's father, the Marquis Albert de Blois; The Marquis in fact kidnapped, raped, and imprisoned her for the duration of the resulting pregnancy for the sole purpose of bearing Victorique – a child with Gray Wolf intellect which he could use for his own ends. Immediately after she gave birth to Victorique, the Marquis placed Cordelia in a sanitarium where she remained until she was freed by Roscoe. Despite the circumstances of Victorique's birth, Cordelia loves her daughter deeply, and watches over her closely, even visiting her to deliver a pendant containing her picture despite the risk of being found by the Marquis.

Marquis Albert de Blois (アルベール・ド・ブロワ侯爵, Arubēru do Burowa Kōshaku)
Voiced by: Takayuki Sugō (Anime), David Wald (English)
Marquis Albert de Blois is Sauville's "Minister of the Occult", the main antagonist and Grevil's and Victorique's father. He is responsible for Victorique's secluded life and instructed Grevil to keep track of her movements. Impressed by Leviathan's tricks to impress the king and queen of Sauville, he offered him protection in exchange for creating a Homunculus army. In Leviathan's last moments, he suggested that Albert mate with a woman with extraordinary powers to produce a child capable of achieving his goals. As per this suggestion, Albert then proceeded to kidnap and rape Cordelia Gallo to produce Victorique. He cares little for Victorique as his daughter, seeing her as a mere tool. According to him, Victorique's conception and raising have been part of his plan to seize power in Sauville in spite of an upcoming storm that is set to engulf the entire world. It is implied that the event in question is the Second World War that began more than a decade before its real life counterpart.
Thanks to Victorique's efforts, Albert managed to obtain precious information to topple his main nemesis in the government, The Minister of Science, Jupiter Roget and blackmailed the King into making him the Prime Minister. He also managed to amass a legion of followers by making the people believe that his daughter is the legendary creature "Monstre Charmant". His plans are ruined when Cordelia managed to have Victorique escape with Brian Roscoe's help, exposing Albert's schemes. In the light novel, this gets him arrested and deprived from his project by the government, while in the anime, Cordelia ultimately kills him before being slain herself by one of his female bodyguards.

== Media ==
=== Light novels ===
Gosick began as a light novel series written by Kazuki Sakuraba, with illustrations by Hinata Takeda. Fujimi Shobo and Kadokawa Shoten published 13 volumes between December 10, 2003, and July 23, 2011; nine comprise the main story, while the other four under the title GosickS are side story collections. The first GosickS volume takes place before the first volume of Gosick, GosickS II is between Gosick IV and Gosick V, and GosickS III takes place after Gosick VI. A new series titled Gosick New Continent started on December 25, 2013, following Kazuya and Victorique in 1931 after they moved to North America following the events of the main story.

Tokyopop released the first novel in English in April 2008 and the second in March 2010. It is also published Germany by Tokyopop.

==== Gosick ====
No.	Title	Original release date	English release date
1	Gosick; GOSICK -Goshikku- (GOSICK –ゴシック–)	December 10, 2003; 4-8291-6229-5	April 8, 2008; 978-1-4278-0569-0
Kazuya Kujou, a Japanese student in the Saint Marguerite Academy in Sauville, meets a mysterious girl named Victorique atop the school's library tower. After the mysterious murder of a fortune teller, they face the challenge of the cursed ship Queen Berry.
2	Gosick II: The Crime That Has No Name; GOSICK II -Goshikku – Sono Tsumi wa Na mo Naki- (GOSICK II –ゴシック・その罪は名もなき–)	May 8, 2004; 4-8291-6254-6	March 1, 2010; 978-1-4278-0570-6
Hidden in a newspaper advertisement, Victorique discovers a warning directed to her disappeared mother, Cordelia. In order to find about it, she and Kazuya travel to the Grey Wolf village, where the Midsummer Festival has just started.
3	Gosick III: Beneath the Blue Rose; GOSICK III -Goshikku – Aoi Bara no Shita de- (GOSICK III –ゴシック・青い薔薇の下で–)	October 9, 2004; 4-8291-6273-2	—
Kazuya gets entangled in the sinister business of the Jeantan Department Store, where the jewel known as the Blue Rose is held.
4	Gosick IV: A Fool Represents the Case; GOSICK IV -Goshikku – Gusha wo Daiben seyo- (GOSICK IV –ゴシック・愚者を代弁せよ–)	January 8, 2005; 4-8291-6288-0	—
Victorique, Kazuya and Avril meet the mystery of the alchemist Leviathan, a figure connected to the academy's clock tower.
5	Gosick V: Beelzebub's Skull -Goshikku – Beruzebubu no Zugai- (GOSICK V –ゴシック・ベルゼブブの頭蓋–)	December 10, 2005; 4-8291-6328-3	—
Victorique's father orders her to be taken to a building named Beelzebub's Skull in Lithuania, where an illusionism festival is being held. Kazuya sets to save her.
6	Gosick VI: Night of the Masquerade; GOSICK VI -Goshikku – Kamen-Butōkai no Yoru- (GOSICK VI –ゴシック・仮面舞踏会の夜–)	December 9, 2006; 4-8291-6375-5	—
After improbably escaping from the festival's disaster, Kazuya and Victorique get involved with a new mystery in the return train.
7	Gosick VII: The Rose-coloured Life; GOSICK VII -Goshikku – Barairo no Jinsei- (GOSICK VII –ゴシック・薔薇色の人生–)	March 25, 2011; 978-4-04-428115-1	—
Victorique is taken again by her father in order to solve a mystery involving former queen Coco Rose.
8	Gosick VIII (1): Twilight of the Gods; GOSICK VIII Jou -Goshikku – Kamigami no Tasogare- (GOSICK VIII 上 –ゴシック・神々の黄昏–)	June 23, 2011; 4-04-428121-1	—
9	Gosick VIII (2): Twilight of the Gods; GOSICK VIII Ge -Goshikku – Kamigami no Tasogare (GOSICK VIII 下 –ゴシック・神々の黄昏–)	July 23, 2011; 4-04-428124-6	—

==== GosickS ====
- GosickS: The Reaper Comes in the Spring (GOSICKS –ゴシックエス・春来たる死神–, GOSICKS -Goshikku Esu – Haru Kitaru Shinigami-) ISBN 4-8291-6310-0
- GosickS II: Summer from the Disappearing Train (GOSICKS II –ゴシックエス・夏から遠ざかる列車–, GOSICKS II -Goshikku Esu – Natsu kara Tōzakaru Ressha-) ISBN 4-8291-6352-6
- GosickS III: Memories of an Autumn Flower (GOSICKS III –ゴシックエス・秋の花の思い出–, GOSICKS III -Goshikku Esu – Aki no Hana no Omoide-) ISBN 978-4-8291-6387-0
- GosickS IV: Winter of Sacrifices (GOSICKS IV –ゴシックエス・冬のサクリファイス–, GOSICKS IV -Goshikku Esu – Fuyu no sakurifaisu-) ISBN 978-4-04-428119-9

==== Gosick New Continent ====
- Gosick RED ISBN 978-4-04-110640-2 December 25, 2013
- Gosick BLUE ISBN 978-4-04-102354-9 November 29, 2014
- Gosick PINK ISBN 978-4-04-103646-4 November 30, 2015
- Gosick GREEN ISBN 978-4-04-104596-1 December 2, 2016

=== Manga ===
A manga adaptation, illustrated by Amano Sakuya, was serialized in Fujimi Shobo's Monthly Dragon Age magazine between the January 2008 and May 2012 issues. Fujimi Shobo published eight tankōbon volumes between July 9, 2008, and June 9, 2012.

==== Volume listing ====
No.	Japanese release date	Japanese ISBN
1	July 7, 2008	978-4-04-712558-2
2	November 6, 2008	978-4-04-712577-3
3	July 7, 2009	978-4-04-712615-2
4	January 8, 2010	978-4-04-712644-2
5	November 5, 2010	978-4-04-712693-0
6	February 9, 2011	978-4-04-712710-4
7	September 7, 2011	978-4-04-712745-6
8	June 6, 2012	978-4-04-712794-4

=== Drama CD ===
A drama CD based on the first volume of GosickS, was released on April 21, 2006.

=== Anime ===
Gosick was adapted into a 24-episode anime television series by Bones under the direction of Hitoshi Nanba and script supervision by Mari Okada. The series aired on TV Tokyo between January 8 and July 2, 2011. However, the broadcast of episode 11 and afterward was affected by the 2011 Tōhoku earthquake and tsunami. The series was simulcast by Crunchyroll with English subtitles. The opening theme is "Destin Histoire" by Risa Yoshiki and was released on March 2, 2011. For the first 12 episodes, the ending theme is "Resuscitated Hope" by Lisa Komine and was released on April 27, 2011. From episodes 13–24, the ending theme is "Unity", also by Lisa Komine. Bandai Entertainment had licensed the anime, but later cancelled the release of Gosick. Madman Entertainment have licensed the series in Australia and New Zealand and are releasing subtitled-only DVDs until a dubbed version becomes available. Funimation has licensed the series in North America and released the first half of the series on a Blu-ray and DVD combo pack on May 30, 2017, with an English dub. Following Sony's acquisition of Crunchyroll, the series was moved to Crunchyroll.

== Reception ==
Anime News Network's Carlo Santos commends the first volume of light novels for "a mysterious, elegant atmosphere and an intricate plotline [making] this a thrilling read from start to finish". However, he criticises the light novels for "flashback scenes [that] never really fit in". He also mentions that "the final conclusion is rather far-fetched."
