= Goetia =

Goetia may refer to:

- Goetia (magic), or "low magic", a combination of various folk magical and religious traditions (as distinct from a more formalized "high magic")
  - Goetia (Greco-Roman magic) (γοητεία), low magic in the Greco-Roman world
- Ars Goetia, or The Goetia, the first book of the 17th-century grimoire The Lesser Key of Solomon

== Arts and entertainment ==
=== Fictional entities ===
- Barbatos Goetia, a fictional character in the video game Tales of Destiny 2
- Goetia, a fictional airship piloted by Ellen Mira Mathers, a fictional character in the light novel series Date A Live
- Goetia, a fictional organization in the manga series Demonizer Zilch
- Goetia, a fictional character in the video game Fate/Grand Order
- Goetia, a fictional organization in the manga series Rental Magica
- Goetia, a fictional town in the novel Tread of Angels
- Goetia, a fictional organization in the manga series Wistoria: Wand and Sword

=== Music ===
- Göetia, a 1993 album by Mystifier
- "Goetia", a song by Hecate Enthroned from their 1997 album The Slaughter of Innocence, a Requiem for the Mighty
- "Goetia", a song by Triptykon from their 2010 album Eparistera Daimones
- "The Goetia", a song by Canibus from his 2007 album For Whom the Beat Tolls
- "Goetia (Invoking the Unclean)", a song by Cradle of Filth from their 2012 album Midnight in the Labyrinth
- "Goetia", a 2012 song by Aarni
- "Goetia", songs by John from his 2007 album From Silence to Sorcery
- Goetia: 72 — In umbra lucis, a 2019 composition by Lera Auerbach

=== Other uses in arts and entertainment ===
- Goetia (video game), a 2016 video game
- Goetia, a 2008 novel by Mel Odom
