= Getica (disambiguation) =

Getica is a historical book, "De origine actibusque Getarum" ("The Origin and Deeds of the Getae/Goths") written by Jordanes in the 6th century.

Getica may also refer to:

- Getica (Dio), a historical book which the Suda, Jordanes, and Freculphus attribute to Cassius Dio, while Philostratus sees Dio Chrysostom as its author
- Getica (Criton), a work on the history of the Getae by Criton of Heraclea, which was at the basis of Emperor Trajan's work, Dacica
- Getica (Pârvan) (1926), a book covering the ancient history of the Geto-Dacians by the Romanian historian and archaeologist Vasile Pârvan
- 2nd Infantry Division "Getica", a unit of the Romanian Land Forces
- Romanian Battlegroup Getica, a International Legion for the Defence of Ukraine unit

== See also ==
- Goetia (disambiguation)
- Getia, a proposed renaming for Romania
