= Cinema Complex! =

Japanese manga series

- First tankōbon volume cover

シネマこんぷれっくす！ (Shinema Konpurekkusu!)
- Genre: Slapstick
- Manga
- Written by: Billy
- Published by: Fujimi Shobo
- Imprint: Dragon Comics Age
- Magazine: Monthly Dragon Age
- Original run: April 8, 2017 – October 9, 2020
- Volumes: 6

Cinema Complex! (シネマこんぷれっくす！, Shinema Konpurekkusu!) is a Japanese manga series written and illustrated by Billy. It was serialized in Fujimi Shobo's Monthly Dragon Age magazine from April 2017 to October 2020.

== Synopsis ==
Gakuto Atagawa, a new student at Harimoku Academy and a huge movie fan, was determined to experience the kind of passionate youth he'd seen in films. However, due to a lack of members, he ends up joining the school's most eccentric club, the Film Club (nicknamed "The Death Club"), which is on the verge of being demoted to a mere hobby group. With no other choice, he sets his sights on making a student film and presenting it at the school festival, but things quickly go awry, and he finds himself engaged in daily film discussions with his eccentric upperclassmen.

== Publication ==
Written and illustrated by Billy, Cinema Complex! was serialized in Fujimi Shobo's Monthly Dragon Age magazine from April 8, 2017, to October 9, 2020. Its chapters were compiled into six tankōbon volumes released from December 9, 2017, to January 9, 2021.

No.	Release date	ISBN
1	December 9, 2017	978-4-04-072533-8
2	October 9, 2018	978-4-04-072911-4
3	May 9, 2019	978-4-04-073153-7
4	October 9, 2019	978-4-04-073359-3
5	May 9, 2020	978-4-04-073651-8
6	January 9, 2021	978-4-04-073939-7

== Reception ==
The series was nominated for the fourth Next Manga Awards in the print category and was ranked tenth.
