= Iinari! Aibure-shon =

Japanese manga series

- Iinari! Aibureshon
- Cover from the first volume of the series

いいなり! あいぶれーしょん
- Manga
- Written by: Chizuna Nakajima
- Published by: Fujimi Shobo
- Magazine: Monthly Dragon Age
- Original run: August 9, 2006 – June 9, 2010
- Volumes: 4

Iinari! Aibureshon (Japanese: いいなり! あいぶれーしょん; "Yes-woman! Caress-tion") is a manga consisting of four volumes. It was authored by Chizuna Nakajima and serialized in the shōnen manga magazine Monthly Dragon Age, published by Fujimi Shobo. The story centers around an omorashi character, that is, a character who tends to wet herself in public.

Its popularity soon spawned "Shizukuishi kyun kyun toilet paper" printed with wetting scenes featuring Shizukuishi, an accident-prone public wetter who often carries toilet paper for cleanup. The product premiered at the 2007 summer Comic Market in Japan.
