= Dragons Rioting =

Japanese manga series

- The cover of the first manga volume.

ドラゴンズ ライデン (Doragonzu Raiden)
- Manga
- Written by: Tsuyoshi Watanabe
- Published by: Fujimi Shobo
- English publisher: NA: Yen Press
- Magazine: Monthly Dragon Age
- Original run: November 9, 2012 – January 7, 2017
- Volumes: 9

Dragons Rioting (Japanese: ドラゴンズ ライデン, Hepburn: Doragonzu Raiden) is a Japanese manga series written and illustrated by Tsuyoshi Watanabe. The series is published by Fujimi Shobo in Japan and by Yen Press in the United States.

== Plot ==
As a six-year-old, Rintaro is diagnosed Hentai Syndrome, a disease that could kill him if he becomes sexually aroused. To save him and provide a way for him to live as normal a life as possible, his father teaches him the ways to control his body and mind for ten years in the mountains. When he turns 16, he chooses to enroll into Nangokuren High School, which he believed to be the largest all-boys school in the country. In fact, it is the largest all-girls school that has just become coed. Rintaro now sees transferring out as his mission, but unfortunately for him, he has caught the eye of the three "Dragons", the female leaders of the three biggest factions at the school.

== Characters ==
Rintaro Tachibana (立花 リンタロー, Tachibana Rintarō)
The main male protagonist who is diagnosed with Hentai Syndrome, a rare disease that would be proved fatal if he sexually aroused by some unexpected incidents, which involves nudity. He often try to avoid any lewd thoughts through having a clear mind and a silent and serene heart. He attends to Nangokuren High School because he mistakenly thought it would be an all-boys school.

Ayane (アヤネ, Ayane)
The female protagonist and Rintaro's disciple who viewed bond and friendship as her main strength and willing to help the innocent and helpless students from oppression. She is the leader of her faction of the academy, Ryōzenpaku, one of three main factions in the school.

Kagamiin Kyoka (神咬院 キョーカ, Kagamiin Kyōka)
One of the strongest student of the academy, Kyōka is one of the Dragon whose fighting skills are superior towards both Ayane and Rino. In her philosophy, Kyōka believes the strong ensures eternal survival, which opposes Ayane's philosophy of bonds and benevolence. She is also one of few that knows about Rintaro's disease.

Rino (リノ, Rino)
The smartest and the sharpest student in the academy, Rino is one of the Dragons who uses tactics and wits to defeat her rival. Unlike Ayane and Kyōka, who settle their rivalry with their fists, Rino is an opportunist who observe the situation first, then using the perfect timing to execute her plan for victory. Due to her philosophy that victors would win without failure, Rino often uses anyone as her pawn for her plan and deemed "useless" people would only block her path to become the strongest.

== Release ==
Tsuyoshi Watanabe began serializing the manga in the December issue of Fujimi Shobo's shōnen manga magazine Monthly Dragon Age on November 9, 2012.

North American publisher Yen Press announced its license to the series at its panel at Sakura-Con on April 3, 2015.

=== Volumes ===
No.	Original release date	Original ISBN	English release date	English ISBN
01	May 9, 2013	978-0-31-630541-9	November 17, 2015	978-0-316-30541-9
1. "A Visit from an Unusual Guest" (異天光臨, I Ten Kōrin); 2. "After the Rain Comes Fair Weather" (雨降地固, Ame Furi Djikatame); 3. "Twin Winds Dance Wild" (双風乱舞, Sō Kaze Ranbu); 4. "Flash Sprint" (閃光疾駆, Senkō Shikku)
02	November 9, 2013	978-4-04-712936-8	February 23, 2016	978-0-316-30877-9
5. "Tiger's Move, Fierce Quake" (虎動強震, Tora Dō Kyōshin); 6. "Tiger's Tail, Spring Ice" (虎尾春氷, Tora O Haru Kōri); 7. "Dragon Chases, Tiger Commands" (竜攘虎博, Ryū Jō Tora Haku); 8. "Heavenly Waves, Sworn Friends" (覇嚴断金, Ha Umu Dankin); 9. "Zest and Supremacy" (抜山蓋世, Nukiyama Gaisei)
03	April 9, 2014	978-4-04-070082-3	May 24, 2016	978-0-316-30879-3
10. "Adding Fuel to the Fire" (膏火自薦, Abura Hi Jisen); 11. "Crisis in the Enemy Camp" (敵陣危急, Tekijin Kikyū); 12. "Unrecognized Genius" (伏竜鳳雛, Fuku Ryū Hōsū); 13. "The Phoenix Flies" (鳳凰千飛, Hōō Sen Hi); 14. "Rising from Defeat" (捲土重来, Kendo Jūrai)
04	August 9, 2014	978-4-04-070177-6	August 30, 2016	978-0-316-30880-9
15. "Chance Encounter" (萍水相逢, Heisuiaia); 16. "Concealed Voice" (忍気吞声); 17. "Skewed Acquaintance" (傾蓋知己, Keigaichiki); 18. "Best Friends" (肝胆相照, Kantan'aiterasu); 19. "A Bolt from the Blue" (青天霹靂, Seiten Hekireki)
05	January 9, 2015	978-4-04-070455-5	November 29, 2016	978-0-316-30881-6
20. "A Father's Love" (舐犢之愛); 21. "Trials And Tribulations" (艱難辛苦, Kan'nanshinku); 22. "Trail Blazing" (披荊斬棘); 23. "Spotless Mind" (晴雲秋月, Seiun Shūgetsu); 24. "Ultimate Martial Art Awakens" (極式覚醒, Kyoku-shiki Kakusei); Side Story 1. "The Day Drags On" (一日千秋, Hitoichi Chiaki)
06	August 8, 2015	978-4-04-070456-2	March 21, 2017	978-0-316-46924-1
25. Denkokuji-hai (伝国璽杯); 26. (束髪封帛); 27. Itchōittan (一長一短); 28. Onkochishin (温故知新); 29. Shigemi Tenpi (重見天日); Ichī Senshin (一意専心)
07	February 9, 2016	978-4-04-070803-4	June 20, 2017	978-0-316-47090-2
08	July 9, 2016	978-4-04-070954-3	September 19, 2017	978-0-316-47091-9
09	January 7, 2017	978-4-04-072146-0	December 19, 2017	978-0-316-41404-3

== Reception ==
Nick Smith of ICv2 was unimpressed with the series, calling it "a disappointing step downward in quality for Yen Press". He gave the first volume two stars out of five, calling it "a weirdly unfunny high school martial arts harem comedy". He felt that the fanservice was excessive, despite its attempts to be self-referentially humorous, and opined that the series' only audience would be "readers who want to look at exaggerated, hyper-sexualized high school girls".

Richard Gutierrez of The Fandom Post was much more positive toward the manga, giving it an A+. He wrote that "Tsuyoshi Watanabe has done a masterful job of comically combining Rintaro's suffering, dynamically over the top battles and buxom beauties to create a wonderful story of endurance within a harem atmosphere". Commenting on the fanservice, he wrote that "the average male reader will of course ogle the fanservice dotted across the pages, but it is a shame if you overlook the strong female leads", and questioned Yen Press' decision to rate the series as "mature" due to that element, believing it to be less harmful than the gore in series which had received a lower rating. He concluded by writing that "Dragons Rioting is a becoming a great story of suffering and friendship which I hope will extend into a complete franchise within the near future".
