= Precarious Woman Executive Miss Black General =

Japanese manga series

- Cover of the first volume

残念女幹部ブラックジェネラルさん (Zannen Onna Kanbu Burakku Jeneraru-san)
- Genre: Science fiction comedy, superhero
- Manga
- Written by: Jin
- Published by: Fujimi Shobo
- English publisher: NA: Seven Seas Entertainment
- Imprint: Dragon Comics Age
- Magazine: Monthly Dragon Age
- Original run: May 9, 2015 – July 9, 2025
- Volumes: 13
- Original net animation
- Directed by: Isamu Ueno
- Studio: ReeeznD
- Released: June 5, 2017

Precarious Woman Executive Miss Black General (残念女幹部ブラックジェネラルさん, Zannen Onna Kanbu Burakku Jeneraru-san) is a Japanese manga series written and illustrated by Jin. It was serialized in Fujimi Shobo's Monthly Dragon Age magazine from May 2015 to July 2025. An anime ONA adaptation by ReeeznD was streamed on Production I.G's Anime Beans app in June 2017.

== Media ==
=== Manga ===
The series was serialized in Fujimi Shobo's Monthly Dragon Age magazine from May 9, 2015, to July 9, 2025. The first volume was released on February 9, 2016, and the thirteen and last volume was released on September 9, 2025. The manga is licensed in English by Seven Seas Entertainment.

No.	Original release date	Original ISBN	English release date	English ISBN
1	February 9, 2016	978-4-04-070805-8	July 31, 2018	978-1-62692-818-3
2	October 8, 2016	978-4-04-072051-7	September 25, 2018	978-1-62692-902-9
3	July 7, 2017	978-4-04-072351-8	March 12, 2019	978-1-62692-997-5
4	June 9, 2018	978-4-04-072737-0	July 30, 2019	978-1-64275-123-9
5	April 9, 2019	978-4-04-073134-6	November 17, 2020	978-1-64505-241-8
6	January 9, 2020	978-4-04-073463-7	March 30, 2021	978-1-64505-789-5
7	October 9, 2020	978-4-04-073833-8	October 12, 2021	978-1-64827-293-6
8	June 8, 2021	978-4-04-074100-0	June 28, 2022	978-1-63858-331-8
9	March 9, 2022	978-4-04-074456-8	July 25, 2023	978-1-68579-596-2
10	February 9, 2023	978-4-04-074867-2	August 27, 2024	979-8-88843-629-5
11	January 9, 2024	978-4-04-075281-5	January 28, 2025	979-8-89160-650-0
12	December 9, 2024	978-4-04-075709-4	September 30, 2025	979-8-89373-320-4
13	September 9, 2025	978-4-04-076095-7	June 30, 2026	979-8-89765-355-3

=== Anime ===
An anime ONA adaptation was announced in the May 2017 issue of Monthly Dragon Age on April 8, 2017. It was produced by ReeeznD and directed by Isamu Ueno. It was streamed on Production I.G's Anime Beans app as a launch title on June 5, 2017.
