= Trapped in a Dating Sim (novel) =

Japanese light novel series

- Trapped in a Dating Sim The World of Otome Games is Tough for Mobs
- Cover of the first volume featuring Olivia (left) and Leon Fou Bartfort (right)

乙女ゲー世界はモブに厳しい世界です (Otomegē Sekai wa Mobu ni Kibishii Sekai Desu)
- Genre: Fantasy comedy; Isekai; Science fiction
- Novel series
- Written by: Yomu Mishima
- Published by: Shōsetsuka ni Narō
- Original run: October 1, 2017 – October 15, 2019
- Light novel
- Written by: Yomu Mishima
- Illustrated by: Monda
- Published by: Micro Magazine
- English publisher: NA: Seven Seas Entertainment
- Imprint: GC Novels
- Original run: May 30, 2018 – March 29, 2024
- Volumes: 13
- Manga
- Written by: Yomu Mishima
- Illustrated by: Jun Shiosato
- Published by: Fujimi Shobo
- English publisher: NA: Seven Seas Entertainment
- Imprint: Dragon Comics Age
- Magazine: Niconico Seiga (Dra Dra Sharp) (2018–2021); Monthly Dragon Age (2022–present)
- Original run: October 5, 2018 – present
- Volumes: 13
- Anime television series
- Directed by: Kazuya Miura; Shin'ichi Fukumoto (S1)
- Written by: Kenta Ihara
- Music by: Kana Hashiguchi; Show Aratame
- Studio: ENGI
- Licensed by: Crunchyroll (streaming); SEA: Plus Media Networks Asia
- Original network: AT-X, Tokyo MX, BS NTV; (S1-2); ytv (S1)
- English network: SEA: Aniplus Asia
- Original run: April 3, 2022 – September 23, 2026
- Episodes: 24
- Manga

Otome Game Yōchien wa Mob ni Kibishii Yōchien Desu
- Written by: Yomu Mishima
- Illustrated by: Noko Ōmi
- Published by: Fujimi Shobo
- Imprint: Dragon Comics Age
- Magazine: Monthly Dragon Age
- Original run: June 9, 2022 – February 9, 2024
- Volumes: 2
- Light novel

Trapped in a Dating Sim: Otome Games Are Tough For Us, Too!
- Written by: Yomu Mishima
- Illustrated by: Moge Toi
- Published by: Micro Magazine
- English publisher: NA: Seven Seas Entertainment
- Imprint: GC Novels
- Original run: December 28, 2022 – present
- Volumes: 6
- Manga

Trapped in a Dating Sim: Otome Games Are Tough For Us, Too!
- Written by: Yomu Mishima
- Illustrated by: Renji Fukuhara
- Published by: Fujimi Shobo
- Imprint: Dragon Comics Age
- Magazine: DraDra Flat
- Original run: June 15, 2023 – present
- Volumes: 3
- icon

Trapped in a Dating Sim: The World of Otome Games Is Tough for Mobs (Japanese: 乙女ゲー世界はモブに厳しい世界です, Hepburn: Otomegē Sekai wa Mobu ni Kibishii Sekai Desu) is a Japanese light novel series written by Yomu Mishima and illustrated by Monda. It was originally self-published as a web novel on the web novel service Shōsetsuka ni Narō from October 1, 2017, to October 15, 2019. The series was later published by Micro Magazine as a light novel under their GC Novels imprint on May 30, 2018. A manga adaptation of the series by Jun Shiosato began serialization on October 5, 2018, and is published under the Dragon Comics Age imprint by Fujimi Shobo. Seven Seas Entertainment publishes both the light novel and the manga adaptation in English. An anime television series adaptation by ENGI aired from April to June 2022. A second season aired from July to September 2026.

== Plot ==
An office worker dies and finds himself reincarnated as Leon Fou Bartfort in the Holfort Kingdom of the otome game that he was forced to complete by his sister. In this world, women reign supreme, and survival is particularly tough for 'mobs', background characters like him. Using his encyclopedic knowledge of the game from his past life, Leon sets on disrupting this world and its social hierarchy by finding the cheat item Luxion and enrolling in the Holtfort Academy. He attempts to live a normal life and find a wife, but through his actions he gets embroiled in all kinds of schemes, all while mingling with the nobility and other characters of the otome game.

== Characters ==
Leon Fou Bartfort (リオン・フォウ・バルトファルト, Rion Fō Barutofaruto)
Voiced by: Yūsuke Kobayashi (Drama CD), Takeo Ōtsuka (Anime) (Japanese); Jordan Dash Cruz (English)
The protagonist of the series. After he died, he reincarnated in the otome game world; he is thoroughly aggravated by this, as it was the game his sister blackmailed him into completing. He has black hair, eyes, and an average look, having plain features that let him blend into the background. Despite looking down on overly prideful people, Leon himself enjoys showing arrogance in his abilities, namely as a tactic to damage his opponent's confidence and pride through shows of superiority. Although he tries to stay out of trouble and not interfere with the story of the otome world, he often drags himself to the center of these events for those he cares for.
Olivia (オリヴィア, Orivia)
Voiced by: Yumiri Hanamori (Drama CD), Kana Ichinose (Anime) (Japanese); Jad Saxton (English)
The protagonist of the first otome game, whom Leon befriends. She has light brown hair with greenish-blue eyes. She is a modest girl who is very kind and gentle with people, but lacks self-confidence. This stems from how she is a commoner who attends a school that is dominantly populated by nobles who look down on her. Unlike the main storyline, Olivia is actually happily in love with Leon; as in the game routes, she could not refuse the advances of the captured characters out of societal standing. She and Angelica eventually get engaged to Leon. Had she gone through the game plot, Olivia would have been possessed by an evil ghost; she owes Marie for taking her spot as heroine and making Leon help Olivia.
Angelica Rapha Redgrave (アンジェリカ・ラファ・レッドグレイブ, Anjerika Rafa Reddogureibu)
Voiced by: Yurika Kubo (Drama CD), Fairouz Ai (Anime) (Japanese); Kristen McGuire (English)
The main villainess of the first otome game, whom Leon befriends. She has blond hair with fierce red eyes. Thanks to Marie's meddling, Angelica instead becomes the victim of what should have been Olivia's story. Instead, she becomes best friends with Olivia and engaged to Leon. After all the pressure she put on herself to be Julius' queen, Angie is happy to be with Leon as he has no high expectations of her (primarily because he hates noble ranking).
Luxion (ルクシオン, Rukushion)
Voiced by: Yusuke Shirai (Drama CD), Akira Ishida (Anime) (Japanese); Jim Foronda (English)
An artificial intelligence item with a personality of its own, Luxion assists Leon with his activities. Its main body is a giant black spaceship-like airship but to get around, Luxion takes on the appearance of a small metal ball with a single red lens. Since Leon is technically a New Human, Luxion sometimes messes up his orders as it hates new humans, although it can be loyal to Leon anytime because the latter has a bloodline of the Old Human, a human race who is reincarnated from their previous life on parallel Earth.
Marie Fou Lafan (マリエ・フォウ・ラーファン, Marie Fō Rāfan)
Voiced by: Atsumi Tanezaki (Drama CD), Ayane Sakura (Anime) (Japanese); Sarah Wiedenheft (English)
The daughter of a Viscount family. She's petite, being short with a small chest and slim body, with long blonde hair that frames her face and sky-blue eyes. She comes off as a kind and shy young girl, but in reality, she is selfish and manipulative, taking a central role with the boys while pushing Angelica and Olivia away. She is also Leon's sister from his last life; she feels deeply sorry that she pushed him to play the game causing his death, which started a chain of events that lead to a bad life.
Julius Rapha Holfort (ユリウス・ラファ・ホルファート, Yuriusu Rafa Horufāto)
Voiced by: Ryōta Ōsaka (Drama CD), Kenichi Suzumura (Anime) (Japanese); Ricco Fajardo (English)
One of the main capture target in the first series of the otome game and the crown prince of the Holfort Kingdom. He's considered an idiot and hypocritical by both Marie and Leon, and even his own mother Mylene; considering he ignored Angelica's sound advice. The humiliation conga is only worse by the fact his sister is Marie's daughter from her past life reincarnated; meaning he is stuck with Leon's family one way or another.
Jilk Fia Marmoria (ジルク・フィア・マーモリア, Jiruku Fia Māmoria)
Voiced by: Kohsuke Toriumi (Japanese); Ian Sinclair (English)
One of the capture targets. A green-haired young man who is fanatically loyal to Julius and acts as his right-hand man. While he likes to play the part of loyal subordinate and gentlemen, he is actually quite devious. He will not hesitate to use under-handed or dishonest means to achieve victory, such as when he convinced Leon's sister to plant explosives on Leon's mech during the arena battle.
Brad Fou Field (ブラッド・フォウ・フィールド, Buraddo Fō Fīrudo)
Voiced by: Shinnosuke Tachibana (Japanese); Justin Briner (English)
Brad is a purple haired young man who is one of the five capture targets. He is considered the weakest physically among his peers, though his magical abilities are slightly above average. He is knocked out with a single blow from Leon during the mech battle.
Chris Fia Arclight (クリス・フィア・アークライト, Kurisu Fia Ākuraito)
Voiced by: Kōji Yusa (Japanese); Eric Vale (English)
One of the five capture targets. He has short, light blue hair and glasses, and is considered a master of swordsmanship, owing to a high degree of training and hard work. While he represents the "smart guy" trope, he is actually just as arrogant and smug as his associates, and is easily defeated by Leon.
Greg Fou Seberg (グレッグ・フォウ・セバーグ, Gureggu Fō Sebāgu)
Voiced by: Nobuyuki Hiyama (Japanese); Clifford Chapin (English)
Greg is a meat-headed member of the five main capture targets, who represents the "dumb jock" of the group. While physically strong and skilled in combat, he uses mass-produced arms and armor to show off his personal prowess. Arrogant and bull-headed, he will often charge into battle stupidly without any strategy, such as when he tried to attack Leon's mech suit Arroganz with a piece of metal in his bare hands.
Mylene Rapha Holfort (ミレーヌ・ラファ・ホルファート, Mirēnu Rafa Horufāto)
Voiced by: Sayaka Ohara (Japanese); Kelly Greenshield (English)
The Queen of Holfort Kingdom. She is the wife of Roland and the mother of Julius Rapha Holfort and Erica Rapha Holfort, whom Leon took an interest on her. As she is in a loveless marriage, Mylene was easily wooed by Leon's genuine affection for her.
Noelle Zel Lespinasse (ノエル・ジル・レスピナス, Noeru Jiru Resupinasu)
The protagonist of the second otome game. She's the first daughter and once former of the Lespinasse Household and a second-year high school student at Commonwealth Academy. She is the eldest twin sister of Leila. She becomes Leon's third fiancee.
Leila Zel Lespinasse (レリア・ジル・レスピナス, Reria Jiru Resupinasu)
She is the youngest daughter of the Beltre Household and once former of the Lespinasse Household. She is the younger twin sister of Noelle. Like Leon and Marie, she is also revealed to be originally an Old Human.
Louise Sara Rault (ルイーゼ・サラ・ラウルト, Ruīze Sara Rauruto)
The eldest daughter of the Rault Household and a third-year high school student at the Alzer Academy, a senior of Leon.
Erica Rapha Holfort (エリカ・ラファ・ホルファート, Erika Rafa Horufāto)
The main villainess of the third otome game. She's the youngest child and a crown princess of the Rapha Holfort Household and a second-year high school student at Commonwealth Academy. In reality, she is in fact Marie's daughter and Leon's niece. Back in her previous life, following her mother's expulsion from the family for the role of Leon's death and her selfish life, then followed by her tragic fate after being abandoned by her ex-husband, Erica's former father, Erica herself lived a happy and humbled life with her grandparents and grows mature and wise while still missed her mother. By the time she died at 60, she reincarnate into otome world where her former uncle and mother are reincarnated there too. Originally, Erica's character was meant to be a very cruel war-mongering princess, particularly towards Hertrauda before being condemned for her crimes. By the time she reincarnated as Erica and is immediately aware of the current situation in the new world she is now living in, the villainous role of the original Erica does not come to pass, and the said reincarnator who became Erica prefers to observe her allies and reincarnated former family members from the sidelines with a stable position that did not harm her nor the otome world itself, unlike Marie and Leila. Erica and Marie resume their previous mother-daughter relationship; both happy to be reunited.
Hertrauda Sera Fanoss (ヘルトラウダ・セラ・ファンオース, Herutorauda Sera Fan'ōsu)
The final boss of the third otome game.
Hertrude Sera Fanoss (ヘルトルーデ・セラ・ファンオース, Herutorūde Sera Fan'ōsu)
The older sister of Hertrauda.

== Media ==
=== Light novel ===
Written by Yomu Mishima and illustrated by Monda, Trapped in a Dating Sim: The World of Otome Games Is Tough for Mobs was originally self-published as a web novel on the Shōsetsuka ni Narō web service. Micro Magazine has published thirteen volumes under their GC Novels imprint from May 30, 2018, to March 29, 2024. Seven Seas Entertainment licensed the series in English in April 2020 and the first volume was released digitally on November 19, 2020.

A spin-off light novel series with illustrations by Moge Toi, titled Trapped in a Dating Sim: Otome Games Are Tough For Us, Too! began publication on December 28, 2022. Six volumes have been released as of July 30, 2026. The spin-off series is also licensed by Seven Seas Entertainment.

==== Trapped in a Dating Sim: The World of Otome Games Is Tough for Mobs ====
No.	Original release date	Original ISBN	English release date	English ISBN
1	May 30, 2018	978-4-89637-753-8	February 16, 2021 (print); November 19, 2020 (digital)	978-1-64505-950-9
Prologue; 01. A Reason to Fight; 02. Lost Item; 03. Enrollment; 04. The Protagonist and the Villainess; 05. Noblemen's Etiqutte; 06. The True Protagonist; 07. White Glove; 08. Duel; 09. A Personal Grudge; 10. Love; 11. The Fools; Epilogue; Bonus Chapter: Luxion's Report
2	October 30, 2018	978-4-89637-830-6	May 11, 2021 (print); March 11, 2021 (digital)	978-1-64827-197-7
Prologue; 01. The Queen; 02. A Confession of Love; 03. Airbike Race; 04. Weakness; 05. Dispatching Pirates; 06. Vented Anger; 07. Karma; 08. The Principality; 09. Laughter; 10. Friendship; 11. The Black Knight; 12. Rematch; Epilogue; Bonus Chapter: Luxion's Report 2
3	March 29, 2019	978-4-89637-864-1	September 7, 2021 (print); July 8, 2021 (digital)	978-1-64827-295-0
Prologue; 01. The Elf Village; 02. The Ruin's Secret; 03. An Ill Fate; 04. Behind the Scenes; 05. The Fake Saint; 06. Bonds; 07. Destiny; 08. Into Battle; 09. The Demon; 10. Livia's Power; 11. The Power of Love; 12. The Cruel Truth; 13. Game Complete; Epilogue; Bonus Chapter: Trude and Rauda
4	August 30, 2019	978-4-89637-911-2	January 4, 2022 (print); November 18, 2021 (digital)	978-1-64827-570-8
Prologue; 01. The Alzer Republic; 02. The Academy; 03. Twins; 04. The Republic's Nobility; 05. Oath to the Sacred Tree; 06. Betrayal; 07. The Descendants of Adventurers; 08. The Sacred Tree's Sapling; 09. A Despicable Trap; 10. Marie's Turn; 11. Leon's Turn; 12. The One-Horned Beast; 13. The Oblivious Protagonist; Epilogue
5	January 30, 2020	978-4-89637-975-4	March 8, 2022 (print); January 20, 2022 (digital)	978-1-63858-138-3
Prologue; 01. Two-Timing; 02. Temporary Return; 03. Idiot Brigade, Begone; 04. The Great House Barielle; 05. Oblivious; 06. Destined Partner; 07. Collar; 08. The Idiot Brigade Returns; 09. Former Crown Prince; 10. Villainess; 11. Bride Thief; 12. Everyday Life; Epilogue
6	July 30, 2020	978-4-86716-033-6	June 28, 2022 (print); May 5, 2022 (digital)	978-1-63858-314-1
Prologue; 01. Human Garbage; 02. Serge; 03. Siblings; 04. Our Promise That Day; 05. Human Sacrifice; 06. Ideal, the Supply Vessel; 07. The One Who Operates Behind the Scenes; 08. The Pirate Flag; 09. Love Interests vs. Love Interests; 10. Manipulator; 11. Little Leon; 12. The Truth About House Lespinasse; Epilogue; Bonus Chapter: Aar-bear
7	January 30, 2021	978-4-86716-106-7	December 6, 2022 (print); August 18, 2022 (digital)	978-1-63858-651-7
Prologue; 01. Mother and Son; 02. Holy Kingdom of Rachel; 03. The Republic's Pride; 04. Milady; 05. Traitor; 06. Revolution; 07: A Fight Between Sisters; 08. Familial Bonds; 09. The Mastermind; 10. The Most Dangerous Man; 11. Master; 12. Liar; 13. Remuneration; Epilogue; Recollection: Ideal's Promise
8	June 30, 2021	978-4-86716-157-9	February 14, 2023 (print); December 29, 2022 (digital)	978-1-63858-885-6
Prologue; 01. Marriage Meeting; 02. Introductions; 03. Unexpected; 04. Collar; 05. The Scumbag Knight's Older Brother; 06. Marriage; 07: Earl Roseblade; 08. The Truth Behind Sappie; 09. Colin, the Youngest Son; 10. Little Sisters; 11. A Bond More Unbreakable than Any Chain; Epilogue; Bonus Chapter: Dorothea, the Wife; Bonus Chapter: It Was All a Dream
9	November 30, 2021	978-4-86716-214-9	May 2, 2023 (print); March 30, 2023 (digital)	978-1-68579-638-9
Prologue; 01. The First Prince; 02. Unexpected; 03. Reversal; 04. Investigation; 05. The Holy Kingdom of Rachel; 06. The Strongest Knight; 07. Those Who Slither in the Dark; 08. The Bartfort Sisters; 09. The Fate of Zola and Her Brood; Epilogue
10	May 30, 2022	978-4-86716-299-6	September 19, 2023 (print); May 25, 2023 (digital)	978-1-68579-925-0
Prologue; 01. The First Princess; 02. Date; 03. Devotee; 04. The Nature of the Kingdom's Aristocracy; 05. Fortress of the Golden Hands; 06. Erica and Mia; 07. Adventurer's Blood; 08. Master of the Fortress; 09. Separation; 10. The Ghost Ship; 11. Cutting Ties; 12. A Regular Event; Epilogue
11	December 28, 2022	978-4-86716-367-2	February 20, 2024 (print); January 18, 2024 (digital)	979-8-88843-444-4
Prologue; 01. To the Border; 02. House Frazer; 03. Mylene's Scheming; 04. His Eminence's Motive; 05. House Fanoss's Representative; 06. Long-Lost Little Sister; 07. Womanizer; 08. Get Them Before They Get You; 09. The White Whale; 10. The Submerged City; 11. Roland's Secret Strategy; 12. Soulmates; 13. Awakening; Epilogue
12	July 31, 2023	978-4-86716-451-8	August 13, 2024 (print); July 11, 2024 (digital)	979-8-89160-312-7
Prologue; 01. The Final School Festival; 02. Two Dudes and Their Partners; 03. The Empire's Envoy; 04. An Assassination; 05. Erica and Mia; 06. New Family; 07. A Decision; 08. The Annulled Engagement; 09. Marie's Hero; 10. For My Big Bro; 11. For You; 12. Everyone's Effort; 13. The Essence of the Idiot Brigade; 14. Leon's Regrets; 15. One Versus Five; 16. The Throne; 17. Those with Courage; 18. The Fake Saint; 19. Assembling; 20. The Empire's Strongest Knight; Epilogue; Bonus Chapter: Your Name
13	March 29, 2024	978-4-86716-555-3	January 7, 2025 (print); December 19, 2024 (digital)	979-8-89160-672-2
Prologue; 01. Each Person's Determination; 02. Those Being Deployed; 03. Soul Food; 04. The Past; 05. Departure; 06. The Enormous Fleet; 07. Twin Priestesses; 08. A False Understanding; 09. A Three-Pronged Attack; 10. The Kingdom's Greatest Swordsman; 11. A Real Narcissist; 12. The Masked Knights; 13. Swallowed in Flames; 14: Love; 15. A Worthy Opponent; 16. Revenge; 17. The Strongest Protagonist; 18. The Truth About the Former Emperor; 19. The Neutralizer; 20. The Saint's Forbidden Art; 21. Resurrection; 22. Goodbye; Epilogue

==== Trapped in a Dating Sim: Otome Games Are Tough For Us, Too! ====
No.	Original release date	Original ISBN	English release date	English ISBN
1	December 28, 2022	978-4-86716-369-6	April 2, 2024 (print); March 7, 2024 (digital)	979-8-88843-751-3
2	July 31, 2023	978-4-86716-452-5	September 24, 2024 (print); August 29, 2024 (digital)	979-8-89160-311-0
3	February 29, 2024	978-4-86716-540-9	February 25, 2025 (print); January 30, 2025 (digital)	979-8-89373-182-8
4	September 30, 2024	978-4-86716-639-0	August 26, 2025 (print); July 31, 2025 (digital)	979-8-89373-970-1
5	October 30, 2025	978-4-86716-857-8	August 11, 2026 (print); July 16, 2026 (digital)	979-8-89561-733-5
6	July 30, 2026	978-4-82500-007-0	April 6, 2027 (print)	979-8-90209-075-5

==== Other languages ====
The light novel series is also published in:

- Korea as 여성향 게임 세계는 모브에게가혹한 세계입니다 under the label S Novel Plus by Somy Media, who began publishing on March 13, 2020.
- Taiwan as 輕小說 女性向遊戲世界對路人角色很不友好 by Chingwin Publishing Group beginning on December 17, 2020.
- Thailand as ชีวิตตัวประกอบอย่างตูช่างอยู่ยากเมื่ออยู่ในโลกเกมจีบหนุ่ม under Luckpim Publishing beginning on October 16, 2019.
- Vietnam as Thế Giới Otomegame Thật Khắc Nghiệt Với Nhân Vật Quần Chúng by Tsuki LightNovel beginning in August 2020.

=== Manga ===
A manga adaptation by Jun Shiosato began serialization on October 5, 2018, and is published under the Dragon Comics Age imprint by Fujimi Shobo. The manga moved from the Dra Dra Sharp online manga website to the Monthly Dragon Age magazine on January 8, 2022. Seven Seas Entertainment announced their licensing of the manga adaptation on December 4, 2020, and published the first volume in July 2021, with thirteen tankōbon volumes released as of November 2024. Following artist Jun Shiosato leaving the series, the manga continued with new artist Odoro Tanuki under a new sequel series, titled Otomegē Sekai wa Mobu ni Kibishii Sekai Desu – Kyouwakoku-hen, which began publication in August 2025, and the first volume released in January 2026.

A spin-off manga illustrated by Noko Ōmi, titled Otome Game Yōchien wa Mob ni Kibishii Yōchien Desu, began serialization in Monthly Dragon Age on June 6, 2022. The second and final volume was published in April 2024.

A manga adaptation of the Trapped in a Dating Sim: Otome Games Are Tough For Us, Too! spin-off novels illustrated by Renji Fukuhara began serialization on the KadoComi and Nico Nico Seiga websites under Fujimi Shobo's DraDra Flat brand on June 15, 2023. Its chapters have been collected into three tankōbon volumes released from April 9, 2024, to September 9, 2025.

==== Trapped in a Dating Sim: The World of Otome Games Is Tough for Mobs ====
No.	Original release date	Original ISBN	English release date	English ISBN
1	June 8, 2019	978-4-04-073204-6	August 3, 2021; July 27, 2021 (Early Digital)	978-1-64827-426-8
01. Reincarnated into Darkness; 02. To The Decision; 03. That Which Sleeps Deep Underground; 04. Enrollment; 05. Routine, Then Disaster
2	September 9, 2019	978-4-04-073321-0	October 5, 2021	978-1-64827-447-3
06. Force; 07. White Glove; 08. The Night Before The Duel; 09. These Guys Are Annoying; 10. It's The Best
3	April 9, 2020	978-4-04-073613-6	January 25, 2022	978-1-64827-471-8
11. Love; 12. Fools; 13. Episode I (Part I); 14. Episode I (Part II); 15. Female Friendships Are Fleeting; 16. The Queen
4	August 7, 2020	978-4-04-073770-6	April 26, 2022	978-1-63858-172-7
17. A Confession of Love; 18. The Saint's Items; 19. Upperclassman Clarice; 20. Individual Circumstances; 21. Rift
5	December 9, 2020	978-4-04-073901-4	June 7, 2022	978-1-63858-284-7
22. The Harbinger of a Collapse; 23. Vanquishment of the Sky Pirates I; 24. Vanquishment of the Sky Pirates II; 25. Vanquishment of the Sky Pirates III; 26. The Right Path
6	July 9, 2021	978-4-04-074171-0	November 15, 2022	978-1-63858-670-8
27. A Short Respite; 28. Gertrude; 29. Uprising; 30. Going to War; 31. The Power of the Saint
7	January 8, 2022	978-4-04-074384-4	April 11, 2023	978-1-68579-478-1
32. Friends; 33. Livia; 34. The Black knight; 35. Vanquish; 36. Post-Battle Cleanup
8	May 9, 2022	978-4-04-074528-2	September 5, 2023	978-1-68579-921-2
37. Episode II, Part I: Rematch; 38. Episode II, Part II: Marie; 39. The Saint's Bodyguards; 40. New Embarkation; 41. The Elf Village
9	October 7, 2022	978-4-04-074714-9	January 23, 2024	979-8-88843-123-8
42. The Subterranean Ruins; 43. Secret of the Ruins; 44. The Town Elder's Divination; 45. Conspiracy; 46. Unexpected
10	April 7, 2023	978-4-04-074934-1	June 25, 2024	979-8-88843-653-0
47. Respective Agendas; 48. Get on Your Knees; 49. Chivalry; 50. The Path to Commander-in-Chief; 51. You?!
11	September 8, 2023	978-4-04-075124-5	January 7, 2025	979-8-89160-204-5
12	April 9, 2024	978-4-04-075407-9	June 17, 2025	979-8-89373-183-5
13	November 9, 2024	978-4-04-075688-2	November 18, 2025	979-8-89561-225-5

==== Otomegē Sekai wa Mobu ni Kibishii Sekai Desu – Kyouwakoku-hen ====
No.	Japanese release date	Japanese ISBN
1	January 9, 2026	978-4-04-076223-4
2	August 7, 2026	978-4-04-076506-8

==== Otomegē Sekai wa Mobu ni Kibishii Sekai Desu – Comic Anthology ====
No.	Japanese release date	Japanese ISBN
1	January 9, 2026	978-4-04-076228-9

==== Otome Game Yōchien wa Mob ni Kibishii Yōchien Desu ====
No.	Japanese release date	Japanese ISBN
1	April 7, 2023	978-4-04-074935-8
2	April 9, 2024	978-4-04-075406-2

==== Trapped in a Dating Sim: Otome Games Are Tough For Us, Too! ====
No.	Japanese release date	Japanese ISBN
1	April 9, 2024	978-4-04-075408-6
2	November 9, 2024	978-4-04-075692-9
3	September 9, 2025	978-4-04-076080-3

==== Other languages ====
The manga is also published in:

- Korea as 여성향 게임 세계는 엑스트라에게 엄격한 세계입니다 under Shift Comics by YNK Publishing, beginning on February 13, 2020.
- Taiwan as 女性向遊戲世界對路人角色很不友好 under Chingwin Publishing Group beginning on December 17, 2020.
- Thailand as ชีวิตตัวประกอบอย่างตูช่างอยู่ยากเมื่ออยู่ในโลกเกมจีบหนุ่ม under Luckpim Publishing beginning on August 5, 2019.

=== Anime ===
An anime television series adaptation was announced on November 25, 2021. It is produced by ENGI and directed by Kazuya Miura and Shin'ichi Fukumoto, with Kenta Ihara writing the scripts, Masahiko Suzuki designing the characters, and Kana Hashiguchi and Show Aratame composing the music. The series aired from April 3 to June 19, 2022, on AT-X and other networks. The opening theme song is "Silent Minority", performed by Kashitarō Itō, while the ending theme song is "Selfish" by Riko Azuna. Crunchyroll streamed the series. On April 11, 2022, Crunchyroll announced that the series will receive an English dub, which premiered on April 17 of the same year.

A second season was announced on December 26, 2022, with the staff and cast reprising their roles. The season set to premiered on July 8, 2026. The opening theme song is "Jinsei Endroll" (人生エンドロール; 'Life's Ending Credits'), performed by Ando, while the ending theme song is "Ashita wa Ashita no Que Sera Sera" (あしたはあしたのけせらせら！; 'Tomorrow is Tomorrow's Que Sera Sera'), performed by Meishohikokai.

==== Episodes ====
===== Season 1 (2022) =====
No. overall	No. in season	Title	Directed by	Storyboarded by	Original release date
1	1	"I Hate This World"; Transliteration: "Ore wa Kono Sekai ga Kirai da" (Japanese: 俺はこの世界が嫌いだ)	Shin'ichi Fukumoto	Toshihiko Masuda	April 3, 2022
After completing an Otome game, a Japanese salaryman hits his head and dies, later reincarnating as a five-year-old named Leon Fou Bartfort inside the game that combines rural living on floating islands with futuristic technology. Society is female-dominated, and men are husbands or paramours to noble ladies. Leon's father is married to Lady Zora, Leon's stepmother. Ten years later, Leon has prepared to enter The Academy, where men find wives or become paramours. Zora suddenly announces that he must marry her friend's ugly 50-year-old daughter. Leon uses pre-knowledge of the story to locate a powerful ship named Luxion, which should have been found by the game's female protagonist in the original story. Luxion is controlled by an Artificial intelligence that attempts to kill Leon because he is a New Human, the current breed of human that can use magic and eradicate the non-magic humans that created Luxion. However, Leon has an Old-Human soul, allowing him to register as Luxion's owner. Three months later, Zora happily assumes Leon died, only for Leon to appear with an absolute fortune in treasure looted from dungeons using his pre-knowledge. Now independently wealthy, Leon is able to ignore Zora's demand that he get married and attend the Academy as originally planned, where the game's characters are gathered to begin the story.
2	2	"Hey, Girl. Wanna Get Some Tea?"; Transliteration: "Soko no Kanojo Ocha Shitekanai?" (Japanese: そこの彼女 お茶してかない？)	Shigeki Awai	Hiroshi Kugimiya	April 10, 2022
Leon is unwillingly made a baron due to his achievements, meaning any future wife must be of nobility. Leon witnesses the start of the storyline and sees the romantic interests, Prince Julius and his friends Jilk, Brad, Chris, and Greg, whom the heroine must choose a husband from, and the rich antagonist Angelica Redgrave. He witnesses a game event where the heroine is supposed to slap a man, but it is a girl named Marie instead. Julius socializes with Marie, to the irritation of Angelica, his fiancée. Leon meets the real heroine, commoner and scholarship student, Olivia, who begins a tentative friendship with Angelica. During dungeon exploration, Angelica confronts Marie for ingratiating herself with Julius but is told by Julius to back off. Leon realizes the noble students are using him and Olivia as human shields, and after defeating several monsters, Julius and his friends defeat the rest and take all the credit. Marie heals Julius' injury, and when Angelica protests, Julius publicly dismisses her while holding hands with Marie. Olivia heals Leon, revealing that her magic skills earned her the scholarship. Leon is troubled by the changes to the storyline, especially concerning Marie, who is more devious than she appears and has somehow replaced Olivia as the storyline's heroine.
3	3	"Let's Duel, Prince"; Transliteration: "Kettō Shiyō ze, Ōji-sama" (Japanese: 決闘しようぜ、王子様)	Chihiro Kumano	Chihiro Kumano	April 17, 2022
Bullies target Marie, so Julius forbids Angelica from socializing with him, an in-game event that should happen much later. Leon and Olivia see Marie secretly kissing Brad. Marie is shown to know she is in a game. Leon asks Luxion to begin gathering information as he suspects Marie is a reincarnation like himself. Angelica attempts to reveal Marie's infidelity to Julius, but he already knows, as Marie has successfully made all five love-interests fall in love with her. Angelica challenges Marie to a duel, but all five love-interests volunteer as Marie's champions. Leon already knows that whether Angelica wins or loses the duel, it ends with her disgraced and forced to marry an abusive husband, so he volunteers as Angelica's champion, and it is agreed they will fight using large robotic suits called Armors. Marie's use of game dialogue confirms she is aware of the storyline. Leon learns students are betting on the duel and bets a small fortune on himself to win. Angelica believes Leon is insane. On the day of the duel, Luxion delivers Leon the armor of Arroganz. However, this is met with mockery from the audience as Arroganz is very different from the love-interests' modern armors, though Leon is still confident he will beat all five of them.
4	4	"Mind If I Go Easy on You?"; Transliteration: "Tekagen Shite Yatte mo Ii ka na?" (Japanese: 手加減してやってもいいかな？)	Sumito Sasaki	Shigeru Yamazaki	April 24, 2022
Angelica explains to a confused Olivia that Arroganz is a Lost Item made by Old-Humans, but it is large and slow, whereas the love-interests emphasize speed. Leon first faces Brad, who wields a lance. Leon mistakenly equips a large shovel instead of a sword but uses it anyway. Brad's fighting style is so predictable that Leon knocks him out instantly. Greg uses a long spear, but his favorite armor has been repaired numerous times, so Leon is able to break it apart and expose Greg as the weak bully he truly is. Chris wields a sword but is weak against guns, so Leon shoots at him until Chris' sword is destroyed. Jenna, Leon's sister, who is angry that Leon is embarrassing their family by making enemies of higher-ranked nobles, plants explosives on Arroganz on Jilk's orders. Luxion informs Leon of this, but Leon expected cheating and knows Arroganz can withstand the blast. With his cheating foiled, Jilk tries to fight Leon but is defeated just as easily, infuriating Marie. Before they fight, Leon asks Julius about Olivia. Julius admits he has heard of her but has never met her, which is impossible since their meeting was supposed to be the beginning of the story.
5	5	"It's Awesome"; Transliteration: "Saikō da ne" (Japanese: 最高だね)	Yuki Kanazawa	Hiroshi Kugimiya	May 1, 2022
Leon torments Julius with the absurdity of sharing Marie with the other love-interests. Julius claims Marie loves him for who he is. Leon points out that if Julius continues to reject Angelica, he might be stripped of his title of prince. Julius still chooses Marie, so Leon destroys his armor and wins the duel. Julius officially cancels his engagement to Angelica. Leon strikes a deal with Angelica's father: expulsion from the Academy and surrendering his noble titles in exchange for protection from Julius' family. He agrees but insists Leon take Angelica with him to the countryside. Returning home, Zola is furious at the trouble Leon has caused but is cowed into silence by Angelica's presence. On Leon's private island, Angelica and Olivia enjoy his hot spring baths and become closer as friends. Marie is furious when all the love-interests, including Julius, lose their titles, ending her plans for an easy life. Julius and the love-interests are forced to earn their own money by raiding dungeons, though this makes them happier than they have been in years. Leon is annoyed when Julius' parents, the King and Queen, promote him to 6th-rank noble as thanks for teaching Julius an important lesson, necessitating his return to the Academy to find a noble wife. However, this time he is happy; he has friends in Angelica and Olivia.
6	6	"My First School Festival"; Transliteration: "Gakuensai tte Hajimete na no" (Japanese: 学園祭って初めてなの)	Chihiro Kumano	Chihiro Kumano	May 8, 2022
Leon hosts a maid café with Olivia and Angelica for the Academy's student festival. Jenna reveals she has successfully stolen a rich viscount's son away from one of her friends and wants Leon to threaten her friend into not retaliating, but Leon refuses. Leon is furious that Marie opened a competing café with Julius and the love-interests as waiters. Olivia manages to attract one customer, Carla Fou Wayne, who wants to meet Leon. Queen Mylene, Julius' mother, attends the festival to meet Leon. When she sees how much abuse Leon, Olivia, and Angelica receive from a customer named Stephanie, the daughter of Count Offrey, she tries to defend him. Leon finally loses his temper when Stephanie insults Mylene, beats up Stephanie's servants, and causes her to flee when she realizes she has insulted the Queen. Compared to the feral girls at the Academy, Leon is smitten with Mylene and half-jokingly asks her to marry him. This flatters her but annoys Julius, who punishes Leon. Mylene is furious at Julius for daring to criticize Leon when he himself is acting dishonorably and demands to meet Marie, who has been blatantly manipulating him. Carla asks Leon to save her Wayne family from ruin.
7	7	"We Both Hate Hot Guys"; Transliteration: "Onaji Ikemen-girai" (Japanese: 同じイケメン嫌い)	Susumu Yamamoto	Shigeru Yamazaki	May 15, 2022
As Carla had officially requested his assistance, Leon is unable to refuse. Olivia and Angelica's friendship is strained when bullies refer to Olivia as Angelica's pet. The festival includes a flying bike race, with third-year student Dan Elgar the favorite to win. Leon uses Luxion's prediction programming to make a fortune gambling on the races. Jilk's ex-fiancée, Clarice, has injured him for dumping her, preventing him from racing. Marie manipulates Leon into becoming Jilk's substitute by pointing out Angelica will be shamed if he refuses. Dan reveals Clarice had her heart broken by Jilk. Despite agreeing they both hate Jilk, Dan swears to beat Leon as Jilk's substitute. During the race, Leon is attacked by all the racers bankrupted by his wagers. Stephanie upsets Olivia by revealing Angelica once treated commoners as badly as she does, causing Angelica to attack her. Leon wins the race, but his bike explodes. Dan saves him from falling to his death since they both hate Jilk. Leon forces Jilk to give Clarice the apology she deserves, surprising her that Leon has a kind heart behind his evil personality. Leon convinces Olivia to give Angelica another chance despite how difficult a future friendship between a commoner and a noble might be. Carla asks Olivia for a private conversation.
8	8	"This Isn't a Game"; Transliteration: "Kotchi mo Asobi ja nēn da yo" (Japanese: こっちも遊びじゃねえんだよ)	Masashi Tsukino	Hiroshi Kugimiya	May 22, 2022
Carla reveals she is taking orders from Stephanie, scaring Olivia into obeying her orders. From the game, Leon knows Carla's land is being invaded by Sky Pirates, who were actually working for Stephanie and Carla in a plot to send Olivia into a winless battle. The defeat of the Pirates is a major plot point for Olivia, but Leon decides to defeat the Pirates himself. Luxion worries Leon is robbing Olivia of opportunities to grow stronger and more confident. Carla, who now controls Olivia, brings Brad and Greg on the mission. Angelica learns what Stephanie did to Olivia, threatens to hurt her if she did anything to Olivia, and rushes to find her. Brad reveals Stephanie is his ex-fiancée, and ending their engagement was very risky; her family being essential to protecting the kingdom from the neighboring Fanoss Duchy, particularly their strongest warrior, the Black Knight. Piloting Arroganz, Leon defeats the Pirates. Greg realizes war is very different from duels and gains respect for Leon. Carla attempts to blame Olivia, but Leon instead exposes her crimes to her father, forcing her to confess Stephanie planned everything to ruin Olivia. With Stephanie's lies in her head, Olivia becomes depressed, believing Angelica really does see her as a pet and Leon must only want her sexually. Leon realizes just how much hurt he has caused Olivia by overprotecting her and not letting her learn by doing things for herself. He becomes silent when she tells him she is a person, not his pet.
9	9	"She's a Doormat"; Transliteration: "Tsugō no Ii Joshi Desu kara" (Japanese: 都合のいい女子ですから)	Motohiko Niwa	Toshihiko Masuda	May 29, 2022
Leon realizes the love-interests try to impress Marie but also let her do things on her own, unlike him and Olivia. Marie starts raiding dungeons, determined to retrieve a certain relic before Olivia. The rest of the pirates attack the ship. Olivia tries to help but is attacked by the pirate captain. Brad and Greg intervene, but Brad's sword skills are still lacking. Leon realizes this is how the story should go, with the love-interests helping Olivia without him. He steps in and defeats the captain, looting from him the Holy Necklace, one of the relics Olivia needs to eventually become a Saint. Olivia is devastated when Leon becomes distant from her, hoping she will become friends with the love-interests like she was supposed to and forget about him. Angelica becomes furious at Leon for hurting Olivia so badly. Angelica and Olivia's friendship becomes even more strained, and they distance one another. Luxion finds evidence linking the pirates to Stephanie, who is arrested by the royal family, ending her crimes for good. Leon gives full credit for the pirates' defeat to Brad and Greg and intervenes to have their families reinstate them as family heirs. They are grateful but choose to annoy Leon by having the Queen promote Leon to lower fifth-rank nobility, a status higher even than Leon's own father. He is further annoyed when Clarice's father, grateful he forced Jilk to apologize, arranges for him to be promoted to upper fifth-rank after he graduates the Academy, much to his chagrin.
10	10	"Unlike You Wannabe Nobles"; Transliteration: "Ese Kizoku to wa Chigatte" (Japanese: エセ貴族とは違って)	Chihiro Kumano	Chihiro Kumano	June 5, 2022
Another game event arrives: the school trip. Leon visits a shrine and coincidentally meets Angelica and Olivia. Leon receives shrine charms that she shares with Angelica, who receives a Red Elemental Blessing, and Olivia, who receives a White Elemental Blessing. Leon receives Fortune in War. The academy ship is attacked by Princess Hertrude of the Fanoss Duchy, who declares war, an event not supposed to happen until the end of the game. Angelica volunteers as a hostage, and when Leon and Olivia try to protect her, Hertrude's Commander Garrett forces other students to beat them. Holfort Kingdom orders Chris to delay Hertrude as long as possible, even if they all die. Most students cowardly refuse, so as a high-ranked noble, Leon orders every student to fight, shaming them by calling them false nobles. Deirdre Roseblade, the highest-ranked noble below Angelica, is insulted and proclaims her family's achievements. Still, even she is shamed when Leon points out those achievements belonged to her ancestors, while she acted as a coward like everyone else. Through shame, anger, and wounded pride, every student agrees to fight. Impressed by his rudeness and brazen lack of respect, Deirdre falls in lust with Leon. Leon promises Olivia he will save Angelica. Hertrude reveals she controls her monsters with her flute as they attack Leon as soon as he leaves the ship.
11	11	"What I Can Do Now"; Transliteration: "Ima, Watashi ni Dekiru Koto o" (Japanese: 今、私にできることを)	Masato Uchibori	Hiroshi Kugimiya	June 12, 2022
Garret fires on the academy ship. Olivia, enhanced by the White Elemental Blessing Charm, activates her dormant Saint Powers and conjures a shield around the ship, saving everyone. Leon is glad he didn't hold Olivia back enough to stifle her power. With Olivia protecting the ship, Leon infiltrates Hertrude's ship, frees Angelica, captures Hertrude, and gets revenge on Garret by removing his famous mustache. Furious, Garret resumes firing, and Hertrude releases her control of the monsters so they will attack her in revenge and bring down the academy ship. Enhanced by the Red Elemental Blessing Charm, Angelica uses fire magic to protect the ship when Olivia collapses from magical strain. They reconcile as Angelica assures a crying Olivia she is stronger than she thinks and has never once held them back. While saving Angelica, Olivia falls off the ship, forcing Leon to catch her. Olivia finally scolds Leon for being distant and confesses she loves him despite his claims of being a terrible person. Leon's main ship, the Partner, finally arrives and protects the academy ship. Leon pilots Arroganz and swears he will defeat the Fanoss Duchy so soundly that they will never dare invade again. Garret deploys his secret weapon, Sir Vandel, the Black Knight.
12	12	"No Matter How Tough the World of Otome Games Is"; Transliteration: "Tatoe Dore dake, Kono Otomegē Sekai ga Kibishikute mo" (Japanese: たとえどれだけ、この乙女ゲー世界が厳しくても)	Shin'ichi Fukumoto	Shigeru Yamazaki	June 19, 2022
Leon struggles against Vandel, who has decades more battle experience. However, Leon traps Vandel's armor in a bear hug and holds Vandel at gunpoint. Desperate to preserve his reputation, Garret summons every monster for miles to destroy himself, his army, and every witness. Leon reveals that Luxion's main ship has been hiding above the clouds and destroys the monsters. As Leon claims Vandel's legendary sword, Garret and Vandel are forced to retire in disgrace. Leon forces Chris to take credit for the victory to be reinstated as his family's heir. Days later, the love-interests build a new armor piloted by Greg to re-challenge Leon, so he stops meddling in their relationships with Marie. Fed up with dueling, Leon deliberately plans to lose until Luxion analyses the armor, which is so faulty it will explode and kill Greg. Leon is forced to destroy the armor to save Greg, winning his duel yet again. Leon is furious to learn capturing Hertrude has earned him the Distinguished Service Medal and promotion to Viscount. Marie reveals she now possesses the Saint's Bracelet and plots to find the other two Saint items to finally replace Olivia as the heroine. Olivia assures Leon she is happy to wait for his response to her love confession, no matter how long. Luxion comments Leon and Marie are very similar as they both used knowledge of the game to get what they wanted, though he decides this is a trivial matter (which it"' isn't'").

===== Season 2 (2026) =====
No. overall	No. in season	Title	Directed by	Storyboarded by	Original release date
13	1	"It's Always Love That Saves the World"; Transliteration: "Ai Koso, Sekai o Sukū'nda Yonā" (Japanese: 愛こそ、世界を救うんだよなぁ)	Wu Yu Xuan	Wu Yu Xuan	July 8, 2026
After defeating the Principality, Leon flies back home to visit his family for winter break. Once there, Zola demands that he relinquish the holy necklace that he took from the Sky Pirates after defeating them. Although Leon is reluctant, Luxion points out that a fleet of temple cruisers surrounds the Bartfort residence, giving Leon no choice but to hand it over. Meanwhile, Carla Fou Wayne, now ostracized by the Academy due to her past link to Stephanie, is approached by Marie, who offers to recruit her as a follower. Leon returns to the Academy after the break and tries to find out who Marie was reincarnated from and what her endgame is, since his prior knowledge of the game tells him how the story ends. He arrives at his room to find dozens of proposal letters from the girls, each with various demands after becoming a viscount, which he unhesitatingly ignores. Garrett and Vandel meet with Hertrauda Sera Fanoss, Hertude's younger sister, to discuss what to do after their defeat. Later, a post appears on the school's bulletin board recruiting Saint's guards, which is seen as Julius trying to restore his status as crown prince, given Marie's status as a saint. Angelica arrives and tells Leon that the nobles, led by Marquis Malcolm Fou Frampton, have already chosen him as captain of the Saint's guards. The palace grants Marie the opportunity to go on a treasure-hunting expedition on another island, in which her followers, alongside Leon, Jilk, Greg, Kyle, Angelica, Olivia, and Hertrude, accompany her. Kyle then points out that the island is his homeland as they're about to land.
14	2	"Do You Enjoy The Aesthetics of Destruction?"; Transliteration: "Horobi no Bigaku ga O'konomi desu ka?" (Japanese: 滅びの美学がお好みですか？)	Takashi Ando	Toshihiko Masuda	July 15, 2026
Upon landing, the group proceeds to the village of Fan. There, the group meets Kyle's mother, Yumeria, whom the villagers, along with Kyle, treat with disdain. The group plans to enter the ruins, but the village leader tells Leon that outsiders are strictly forbidden because of its sacred nature. Marie demands access and is granted it so she can summon an ancient demon lord to judge the villagers. The initial search in the ruins is fruitless, and an upset Marie runs off. Leon pursues her, using the opportunity to converse with her about his suspicions. Marie confirms that she is a reincarnated being, knows that Leon is one, and is using her prior knowledge to manipulate the story in her favor. After the two fall to a sublevel swarming with mysterious monsters, Marie injures her leg and blurts out a line similar to what she used in her previous life when she and Leon were children; Leon responds similarly, which nearly leads Marie to deduce Leon's past identity. Shortly afterward, two elves apprehend them and bring them to the Land of Origin, a laboratory where the monsters originated. They claim elven superiority in creating all sentient life in the lab, but Luxion, along with the lab's AI, points out that humans created the laboratory and the elven race as well. The village leader, siding with the elves, arrives and releases all of the created monsters to dispose of Leon and Marie, but the AI deploys the lab's countermeasures, killing the monsters, and the elves concede defeat after a brief scuffle. The AI transfers the lab's data to Luxion and grants them the treasure they seek: a piece of demonic armor that drives Luxion into using Partner to obliterate the ruins, terrifying the elves. As thanks for their efforts, the village chief reads out their fortunes for the future.
15	3	"Hey, Brat"; Transliteration: "Oi, Kuso Gaki" (Japanese: おい、クソガキ)	Shin'ichi Fukumoto	Hachigoumi (Edgeworks)	July 22, 2026
The village chief reads out the group's fortunes one by one. Marie's fortune claims a long-passed soulmate. Hertrude's fortune foretells a difficult turning point, but she will meet her own soulmate in the process. Both Angelica and Olivia share the fortune of their burdens passing to another, and a hero – whom they believe is Leon – has blessed them. However, the village chief cannot see Leon's fortune beyond telling him a harsh decision awaits him, leaving him unsatisfied. As the group prepares to leave, they ask about Kyle and Yumeria's poor treatment by the villagers: elves view beauty through mana, and Kyle and Yumeria's multi-colored mana elicits disgust. Additionally, due to this mana, conception with humans is possible. While traveling the world, Yumeria fell in love with a noble, but he kicked her out after accusing her of being unfaithful with another elf after she fell pregnant with Kyle. Kyle eventually asked to be sent off the island, which is how he ended up with Marie. The group departs, taking Yumeria with them, with Leon placing her in his family as a live-in servant. Kyle is aghast, but Leon tells Kyle that he can visit Yumeria whenever he wants once she's in his household's care, causing the hostility between Kyle and Leon to wane. Hertrude sneaks into the ship's cargo hold to steal the lost item, but inadvertently awakens it, forcing Luxion to eject it from the ship and destroy it with Partner's primary cannon. Leon has Luxion write a report for the palace detailing the events after arriving empty-handed. Soon after, Leon meets Queen Mylene again and tries to woo her again, which Julius again shuts down. After returning to the Academy, Leon has a tea party with Clarice and Deirdre, but it's interrupted when soldiers enter the room to arrest Leon, accusing him of treason after finding evidence of a Principality plot to rebel against the kingdom. Leon is perplexed, but unaware that Miauler, Jenna's servant, planted the evidence on Malcolm's orders.
16	4	"They're Flip-Flopping Again?"; Transliteration: "Mata Tenohirakaeshi ka yo?" (Japanese: また手のひら返しかよ？)	Yuri Kubo	Hisashi Saito	July 29, 2026
After his arrest, soldiers escort Leon out as most students jeer at him. Most of Leon's assets, such as Partner, fall under the royal army's control. While being guided to solitary confinement, Mylene and Angelica's older brother, Gilbert, pose as the knights escorting him to the dungeon. They tell Leon about an internal conflict within the Holfort Kingdom's government that has been brewing since Julius relinquished his position as a member of the royal family, during which the Redgraves lost influence. In contrast, Malcolm's faction has been gaining power and seeks to eliminate the Redgraves' last bit of influence by framing Leon for treason. To uncover anyone in the palace with ties to the Principality, they use Leon as bait in the dungeon. Back at the Academy, Angelica confronts Hertrude, but she denies knowledge and reveals that as long as the kingdom suffers the consequences of its invasion of Fanoss 20 years earlier, she doesn't care what happens to Leon, angering Angelica. Malcolm suddenly requests Hertrude's presence, where she receives a lost item identical to the one recovered from Fan and subsequently destroyed. Hertrude sends the lost item to Vandel and Garrett. Later, Hertrude visits Leon and offers him the chance to become her servant instead of fighting in an inevitable war for the kingdom that got him arrested, but Leon refuses. With all other options exhausted, Angelica and Olivia ask Marie for help saving Leon, to the point of groveling at her feet, much to Marie's shock. The love-interests then arrive and heed the girls' resolve to save Leon. When asked, Angelica tells Olivia that Leon's safety matters more to her than her royal status. Meanwhile, the Principality fleet, led by Hertrauda, advances on Holfort to wage war.
17	5	"I Love Facades"; Transliteration: "Tatemae ga Daisuki deshite ne" (Japanese: 建前が大好きでしてね)	Kohei Kawai	Toshihiko Masuda	August 5, 2026
Hertrauda orders the Principality to commence its attack on the kingdom, reinforced by summoned monsters. The council is alerted, but Malcolm dissuades retaliation and instead orders the capital to be placed on high alert. Meanwhile, Luxion and Leon, also aware of the invading army, are visited by each of the love-interests who try to free him. However, each idea fails to varying degrees. Although the kingdom suffers heavy losses due to the Principality's superior numbers and firepower, Malcolm chooses instead to strike when the Principality lowers its guard. He orders his baron, Dale, to assassinate Leon with poisoned alcohol, but Leon sees through his act. Dale tries to shoot Leon, but is protected by Luxion and freed with help from the love-interests. While escaping through the woods, Leon and the love-interests are surrounded by soldiers led by Julius' father and Holfort's king, Roland Rapha Holfort. On the front lines, Marie's saint power brings some reprieve for the kingdom, but it is short-lived when Hertrauda unleashes the Guardians of the Sky and Sea, destroying most of the kingdom's reinforcements. Marie cracks under the pressure, and her lie is exposed. Roland, Mylene, Vince Rapha Redgrave, and Bernard Fia Atlee implore Leon to join the fight to repel the invasion, but Leon doubts it, since only Olivia could have beaten the Guardians in the game. With Marie sentenced to death for her act, the love-interests incarcerated, and the kingdom's situation in the war now dire, Leon and Luxion contemplate fleeing, but they are visited by Leon's mentor, Lucas Rapha Holfort, who stays to fight despite the kingdom's slim odds against the Principality. His words encourage Leon to do the same for the kingdom, knowing that he still has allies.
18	6	"If I Don't Like It, I'll Just Run"; Transliteration: "Iya'nara Ore wa Nigeru Dake desu" (Japanese: 嫌なら俺は逃げるだけです)	Sumito Sasaki	Hisashi Saito	August 12, 2026
Despite Mylene's concerns, Leon intends to fight for the kingdom, be appointed supreme commander of the fighting force, and gain access to their royal airship, Weiss. After that, Leon tries to gather friends to join, but most object out of fear; Leon then blackmails them into joining by reminding them of the ships they bought from him, which the Principality will assume link them to Leon. Angelica and Olivia are aware of Leon's self-appointment from Luxion, but are unsure of how to help Leon. Leon's family is evacuating when Leon arrives and reveals Miauler's role in framing him. Enraged, Balcus kills Miauler, much to the shock of his family and the Zolas, who are requesting refuge on the Bartforts' ship. Balcus plans to send Rutart to fight in the war, but Zola reveals Rutart's true lineage as the product of an affair. Balcus divorces her in response and abandons her family to their fate. With the Principality expected to reach the capital in 30 hours and the kingdom's forces depleted, Leon meets with the love-interests, Kyle, Carla, and Marie, to discuss how to counter the Principality, but the latter angrily rebukes her remaining allies after the rest abandoned her after her façade was revealed. Marie passes out from exhaustion, and Leon orders everyone out of the room to speak with Marie alone. In a dream, Marie says she misses her brother; after she wakes, Leon asks Marie why she stole Olivia's destiny, even though she knows Olivia's power is needed to defeat the Guardians toward the end of the game. Marie admits she didn't know, since her brother beat the game for her in her past life. When Leon reveals his sister had him beat the game for her while she traveled abroad, they finally deduce each other's identities. Marie is overjoyed, but Leon is enraged and strikes her across the face.
19	7	"Shut Your Filthy Mouth, Scum"; Transliteration: "Sono kitanai kuchi o tojiro, gomi ga" (Japanese: その汚い口を閉じろ、ゴミが)	Shimichi Fukumoto	Chihiro Kumano & Kazuya Miura	August 19, 2026
Marie explains to Leon that after his death, she missed the funeral, was kicked out by their parents, and forced to work in the nightlife scene; she soon gave birth to a daughter, whom her parents were granted sole custody of, before being murdered by an abusive ex-boyfriend. Leon demands that Marie help Olivia defeat the Guardians to teach her about responsibility, but she runs off in protest. When Olivia confronts her, an agitated Marie demands that Olivia take back everything Marie had taken from her as the protagonist in exchange for Leon, but Olivia refuses. Carla and Kyle then arrive and show Marie that she still has allies. Meanwhile, riddled with self-doubt, Olivia develops an inferiority complex toward Angelica, especially about her feelings for Leon, but Angelica comforts her, saying that while she loves Leon, she would rather Olivia love him too than not at all. At Leon's appointment as supreme commander, Malcolm tries to protest, highlighting his arrest for treason, but Mylene and Leon point out that Malcolm framed Leon to cover up Malcolm's conspiracy with the Principality and his role in instigating the current war. The nobles who visited Leon in prison confirmed Malcolm's treachery, and an arriving knight adds Dale's note of confession and atonement following the latter's suicide. Desperate, Malcolm tries to redirect the blame onto Dale, but Vince brings Hertrude in, who confesses to Malcolm's collusion for status. Malcolm claims he was trying to do right by the kingdom to achieve peace with the Principality, but Leon fires back by pointing out Malcolm's many victims of his traitorous actions. After Malcolm is arrested and disgraced, Leon sardonically orders his forces to war.
20	8	"You Can't Quantify Love!"; Transliteration: "Ai wa Suchika Dekinai!" (Japanese: 愛は数値化できない！)	Shinichi Fukumoto	Chihiro Kumano & Kazuya Miura	August 26, 2026
While attempting to take control of Weiss, Leon is told it can only be operated by the power of love. Leon knows this from the game, since his relationship score with Olivia was high enough to operate it, but it didn't have the ship's activation method: a meter that recognizes two hero descendants who truly love each other as its owners. Roland and Mylene go first, but rank dismally on both ends. Afterward, the love-interests each try with Marie, but also fail. Angelica and Olivia then drag Leon to the stage to try their hand, but when Angelica and Olivia step onto the stage first, they rank overwhelmingly high, much to Leon's shock. While the forces mobilize, Roland tells Julius that he's evacuating with his family while his friends fight in the war as punishment for calling off his engagement to Angelica. At the same time, Mylene gives Hertrude a written report on the reparations the Principality owes the kingdom for its acts of cruelty; the former grand duke of the Holfort Kingdom became the grand ruler of the Principality and used his position to commit barbaric acts against other nations. This prompted Holfort to invade and attempt to reclaim all territories the grand duke had stolen. Despite promises of reparations upon victory, the Principality remained hostile. Hertrude is dismayed, and her allegiance to the Principality is shaken. Luxion activates Partner when the Principality attacks the capital and sends Arroganz to pick up Leon. Leon's friends, Daniel and Raymond, are injured when their ship is shot down by a Principality captain while protecting Deirdre and Clarice from the former. Reinforcements arrive at the same time Leon does, but Leon snaps and kills the captain, planning to do the same to anyone who stands in his way.
21	9	"Livia......"; Transliteration: "Ribia......" (Japanese: リビア......)	Yu Hyun Oh	Yu Hyun Oh & Kazuya Miura	September 2, 2026
After forgoing his morality, Leon begins killing countless Principality mechs and destroys several ships. Meanwhile, Malcolm, who had broken out of prison, attempts to kill Hertrude, but Vandel – who had fused with the lost armor gifted by Hertrude – instead kills Malcolm and retrieves Hertrude. The kingdom's remaining forces head into the fray, with Leon having Luxion fight the Sea Guardian below the surface and appointing Marie as support for Weiss. Using Roland's disguise and armor, Julius arrives to join the fight; Leon sees through it and berates him, but ultimately lets him fight alongside his friends on the front lines. On Weiss' bridge, Angelica and Olivia are greeted by the ship's AI commander, Cleare: the same AI Luxion had gained from the ruins. Reuniting with Hertrauda, Hertrude finds her physically exhausted, as summoning the Guardians had drained her life force. Nevertheless, as the kingdom's fleet approaches, Hertrauda is ready to sacrifice herself if needed for the sake of the Principality. At Lake El Doral, the chosen intercept point, the Holfort forces struggle at first against the Principality, as the Guardians regenerate from any damage they take. Angelica and Olivia use Weiss as a battering ram to shatter the Sky Guardian's defensive barrier, but it remains impervious to damage. Olivia, haunted by the bloodshed and voices of the dead caused by the war, unlocks the ability of Heart Sharing through her desire to protect her loved ones. With it, she revokes the anger and willpower to fight on both sides and disintegrates the Guardians and monsters.
22	10	"They Hit Where It Hurts"; Transliteration: "Karera wa itai tokoro o tsuite kuru" (Japanese: 彼らは痛いところを突いてくる)	Ruvu Ōshima	Toshihiko Masuda & Kazuya Miura	September 9, 2026
Shortly after Olivia's power destroys the Principality's assistance, Hertrauda succumbs to the summoning contract and dies. Vandel is unaffected and combines the lost item with his armor before racing off to confront the remaining forces. Olivia pleads with Vandel to stop the fighting, but Vandel refuses to stop fighting for those who had been slain in the war. The love-interests try to intercept Vandel, but he defeats them effortlessly before Leon arrives. Vandel asks Leon why he is fighting for the kingdom, given the kingdom's viewpoints toward males like them, but Leon had already been informed of this fact by Mylene, who stated that its matriarchal society was placed as the kingdom's own penance for allowing the Principality's conception; however, this left the kingdom in a disadvantageous state for future wars, as remote lords were married off to women with status for them to pamper. Additionally, she tells him the Academy was founded to phase out the nobles. Leon is ultimately left conflicted in his defense of the kingdom due to his disgust and the consequences it has reaped in the present day. Onboard the Principality's main ship, Garrett insults Hertrude's family before revealing that he had her parents killed due to their opposition to war. He then tries to execute Hertrude, but rogue projectiles from Vandel and Leon fight interrupt him. Grief-stricken and angered, Hertrude – with her allegiance to the Principality shattered – uses her flute to call upon the final boss of the otome, the Land Guardian, to kill everyone, regardless of affiliation. Although Partner is badly damaged, Luxion aids Leon by merging Arroganz with the modified Schwert, putting him on equal footing with Vandel. Meanwhile, Marie deduces a way to defeat the final boss.
23	11	"I Don't Care About That!"; Transliteration: "Son'na no Dō'datte'ī!" (Japanese: そんなのどうだっていい！)	Yu Hyun Oh	Toshihiko Masuda & Kazuya Miura	September 16, 2026
As Leon and Vandel continue their fight, Marie – having deduced a way to defeat the monster via a cutscene from the otome – tells the others that Hertrude's flute is the key to stopping the Land Guardian and the monsters. She orders the team to advance on the Principality's main ship, where the Land Guardian tries to attack them, but is intercepted by a surprise attack from Luxion. Arriving on the ship, Angelica, Olivia, and Marie find Hertrude, still stricken with grief and rage, fixated on her goal of revenge for her family. Olivia tries pleading against this, but Marie angrily chastises her, understanding Hertrude's experience with loss, since she had experienced the same when Leon died in their past life. Having a change of heart from Marie's words, Hertrude plays the flute again to force a surrender for the Principality, but in doing so, has broken the contract with the Land Guardian and is now its prey. Vandel, heavily injured and near death, lands before the ladies. Hertrude tries to force him to surrender, but Vandel, steadfast in fighting to the bitter end, refuses to back down. Despite his resolve, Leon impales him with his sword and fires Arroganz's signature move, Impact, to separate Vandel from the lost item, which Leon promptly crushes. Vandel wishes Hertrude happiness before dying. At the same time, Leon faces off against the Land Guardian; fueled by both the power of Luxion and Weiss, Leon fires a strengthened form of Impact that annihilates the Land Guardian, consequently freeing Hertrude from her curse. With the war over, Arroganz crash-lands, but Angelica and Olivia rescue Leon. At that moment, Leon decides to act on his feelings for the two at Luxion's advice.
24	12	"This World Is Tough for Mobs"; Transliteration: "Sekai wa Mobu ni Kibishii Sekai Desu" (Japanese: 世界はモブに厳しい世界です)	Yuri Kubo	Hisashi Saito	September 23, 2026
After the war's conclusion, the Principality is dissolved as the Fanoss Duchy rejoins the kingdom. However, to secure a treaty, an arranged marriage between Julius and Hertrude is announced, but the former attacks the Fanoss in response and is arrested, along with the other love-interests and Marie for attempting to stop the latter's execution. Leon agrees to Mylene's request to spare them in exchange for his war earnings, and to grant them residence in the Bartfort Territory. Angelica and Olivia then arrive to talk with Leon, where the two profess their love for him. Although Leon is struck by their sudden confession, Leon reciprocates their affections. A short while later, as life looks up for the Bartforts, Leon – despite wanting to live a quiet life following the war – is instead promoted to a count for his efforts, the highest rank for non-royals, much to his grief. Marie reveals that the otome became a trilogy after Leon's death in their past lives, explaining some events in the war that Leon didn't recognize. Because Marie knows what happens in the later games, she pressures Leon for an allowance in exchange for information about the sequel, which is set in the Alzer Republic. Balcus asks Leon to attend an engagement party, but is shocked to learn Roland set up the engagement for Leon himself, not Nicks, whom Leon assumed it was for. That night, knowing Leon is leaving for Alzer the next day, Angelica and Olivia, his now-fiancées, spend the night with him after thanking him for everything he has done for them. Hertrude pays tribute to Hertrauda. The next day, Leon departs on his new ship from Luxion, the Einhorn; however, Marie and the love-interests join him as punishment from Mylene for the love-interests using Marie's group's funds to procure a statue of her.

== Reception ==
By March 2024, the series had over 3 million copies in circulation.

== See also ==
- I'm the Evil Lord of an Intergalactic Empire!, another light novel series by the same author
