= List of compositions by Lera Auerbach =

This is a list of musical compositions by the Soviet-born 21st-century Austrian-American composer Lera Auerbach. Her oeuvre includes concerti, chorales, operas, piano trios, sonatas, preludes, and symphonies.

Most of her works use the standard opus number system.

== By chronology ==
All compositions have been compiled by Sikorski in partnership with Boosey and Hawkes.

Year	Title	Instrumentation	Duration
1986	FANTASIA	piano solo	6 min.
1986-88	TWO SONGS	soprano and piano	5 min.
1990	THE SAD BIRCH	soprano (or mezzo-soprano) and piano	3 min.
1990	MONOLOGUE	flute solo	7 min.
1992	BUTTERFLY	soprano and piano	3 min.
1992	OCTOBER TUNE	tenor (or mezzo-soprano) and piano	4 min.
1992	WE CANNOT REMEMBER THEM	mezzo-soprano and piano	5 min. 15 sec.
1992	AFTER THE END OF TIME	electronic tape	9 min.
1992	MEMENTO MORI	piano solo	12 min.
1992/1996	PIANO TRIO No. 1	violin, cello, and piano	12 min.
1994/1999	CHORALE, FUGUE AND POSTLUD	piano solo	10 min.
1996	T'FILAH	violin solo	6 min. 30 sec.
1996	PRAYER	English horn solo	7 min.
1996	MONOLOGUE	double bass solo	7 min.
1997	POETRY from SONGS OF REBIRTH (No. 1)	soprano and piano	5 min.
1997	PRAYER from SONGS OF REBIRTH (No. 3)	soprano and Piano	3 min.
1997	MONOLOGUE	viola solo	5 min. 30 sec.
1997	DIALOGUE WITH TIME	orchestra	8 min.
1997	DOUBLE CONCERTO	violin, piano, and orchestra	31 min.
1999	24 PRELUDES	piano solo	52 min.
1999	PRELUDE SUITE (9 preludes from 24 Preludes)	piano solo	15 min.
1999	24 PRELUDES	violin and piano	39 min.
1999	24 PRELUDES	cello and piano	46 min.
1999	PRELUDE SUITE (9 preludes from 24 Preludes)	cello and piano	17 min.
1999	POSTLUDE	violin and piano	2 min. 30 sec.
2000	IMAGES FROM CHILDHOOD	piano solo	11 min.
2000	THREE DANCES IN THE OLD STYLE	violin and cello	5 min.
2000/03	CONCERTO No. 1	violin and orchestra	28 min.
2000	SONATA No. 1	violin and piano	23 min.
2001	THE BLIND (Mysterium)	2 sopranos, 2 mezzo-sopranos, 2 contraltos, 2 tenors, 2 baritones, 2 basses (6 leading voices and supporting chorus)	35 min.
2001	SUITE CONCERTANTE. Concerto grosso No. 1	violin, piano and string orchestra	30 min.
2001	OSKOLKI	violin and piano	14 min. 30 sec.
2001	SONATA No. 2 "September 11"	violin and piano	11 min.
2002	MEMORY OF A TANGO	double bass solo	1 min. 40 sec.
2002	RELUDE, TOCCATA AND POSTLUDE	carillon solo	7 min.
2002	LULLABY	mixed choir	3 min.
2002	PROPHECY	tenor (or soprano) and organ	7 min.
2002	SERENADE FOR A MELANCHOLIC SEA	violin, violoncello, piano and string orchestra	10 min.
2002	SONATA No. 1	cello and piano	24 min.
2002	LONELY SUITE "Ballet for a Lonely Violinist"	violin solo	9 min.
2003	TO THE WORLD from SONGS OF REBIRTH (No. 2)	soprano and piano	4 min.
2003	SONATA No. 1	cello and piano	24 min.
2003	PRELUDE, TOCCATA AND POSTLUDE	vibraphone solo	4 min.
2003	LAST LETTER	mezzo-soprano, violoncello and piano	20 min.
2004	CONCERTO No. 2 "September 11"	violin and orchestra	14 min.
2004	STRING QUARTET No. 1	2 violins, viola and cello	16 min.
2004	THE LITTLE MERMAID. Ballet in 3 acts (Copenhagen version)	orchestra	2 hr. 45 min.
2005	DIALOGUES ON STABAT MATER. Concerto grosso No. 2	violin, viola and string orchestra	39 min.
2005	DREAMS AND WHISPERS OF POSEIDON	orchestra	16 min.
2005	EPILOGUE	2 violins, viola and cello	11 min.
2005	SONATA No. 1 "La Fenice"	piano solo	20 min.
2005	STRING QUARTET No. 2 "Primera luz"	2 violins, viola and cello	23 min.
2005	SONATA No. 3	violin and piano	18 min.
2006	CADENZAS (W.A. Mozart's Piano Concerto No. 20 in D minor K. 466)	piano solo	6 min.
2006	STRING QUARTET No. 3 "Cetera desunt " (Sonnet)	2 violins, viola and cello	21 min.
2006	SONATA No. 2 "Il Segno"	piano solo	17 min.
2006	POSTLUDE	cello and piano	2 min. 30 sec.
2006	POSTSCRIPTUM	violin, cello and piano	5 min.
2006	SYMPHONY No. 2 "Requiem for a Poet"	mezzo-soprano, violoncello, mixed choir and orchestra	42 min.
2006	SYMPHONY No. 1 "Chimera"	orchestra	40 min.
2007	STRING QUARTET No. 4 "Findings – 16 Inventions"	2 violins, viola and cello	27 min.
2007	THE LITTLE MERMAID. Ballet in 3 acts (Hamburg version)	orchestra	2 hr. 15 min.
2007	LUDWIG'S NIGHTMARE	piano solo	7 min.
2007	par.ti.ta	violin solo	25 min.
2007	RUSSIAN REQUIEM	boy's soprano, mezzo-soprano, bass, boys' choir, mixed choir and orchestra	1 hr. 25 min.
2007	SONGS OF NO RETURN	soprano and piano	26 min.
2008	FRAGILE SOLITUDES. Concerto grosso No. 3	string quartet and chamber orchestra	30 min.
2008	SIX PRELUDES	double bass and piano	13 min.
2009	POSTSCRIPTUM	violin, cello and piano	5 min.
2009	SOGNO DI STABAT MATER	violin, viola, vibraphone and string orchestra	12 min.
2009	JOB'S LAMENT	violin and piano	13 min.
2010	ETERNIDAY. Concerto grosso No. 4	string quintet, bass drum, celesta and strings	12 min.
2010	GOGOL. Opera in 3 Acts	boys’ choir, mixed choir and orchestra	2 hr. 15 min.
2010	SPEAK, MEMORY	violin and piano	3 min.
2006/2011	ICARUS	orchestra	12 min.
2011	MILKING DARKNESS	piano solo	10 min.
2011	SERAPHIM CANTICLES.	two violins, two violas and two cellos	22 min.
2011	STRING QUARTET No. 5 "Songs of Alkonost"	string quartet	22 min.
2011	PIANO TRIO No. 2 "Triptych - This Mirror Has Three Faces"	piano trio	23 min.
2012	POST SILENTIUM	orchestra	18 min.
2012	REQUIEM – ODE TO PEACE	2 boys' sopranos, countertenor, bass-baritone, boys' choir, male choir and orchestra	1 hr. 15 min.
2012	STRING QUARTET No. 6 "Farewell"	string quartet	25 min.
2013	SONATA No. 1 "Arcanum"	viola and piano	25 min.
2013	PIANO TRIO No. 3	cello solo	28 min.
2013	STRING SYMPHONY No. 1 "Memoria de la luz"	string orchestra	22 min.
2013	STRING QUARTET No. 7 "Désir"	string quartet	35 min.
2013	IN PRAISE OF PEACE	soprano, mezzo soprano, tenor, baritone, mixed choir and orchestra	28 min.
2013	GALLOWS SONGS	saxophone quartet and children's choir	32 min.
2013	STRING QUARTET No. 8 "Sylvia's Diary"	string quartet	20 min.
2014	DREAMMUSIK	cello and chamber orchestra	34 min.
2014	TRIO for violin, horn and piano	violin, horn and piano	30 min.
2014	TATIANA. Ballet in 2 acts	orchestra	2 hr. 25 min.
2014	CADENZAS (W.A Mozart's Flute Concerto No.2 in D major K. 314)	flute solo	5 min.
2015	CONCERTO No. 1 "Only Through Time Time Is Conquered"	piano and orchestra	44 min.
2015	CONCERTO No. 3 "De profundis"	violin and orchestra	36 min.
2015	SUITE DELS OCELLS	cello solo	23 min.
2016	SYMPHONY No. 3 "The Infant Minstrel and His Peculiar Menagerie"	violin, mixed choir and orchestra	43 min.
2016	SAKURA NO YUME (SAKURA DREAMS)	viola and piano	4 min.
2016	SAKURA NO YUME (SAKURA DREAMS)	piano solo	4 min.
2016	ROOTS	violin and bayan	16 min.
2016	72 ANGELS "In splendore lucis"	choir and saxophone quartet	1 hr. 29 min.
2017	CONCERTO No. 4 "NYx: Fractured Dreams"	violin and orchestra	30 min.
2017	TWOFOLD DREAM. Concerto grosso No. 5	violin, piano and orchestra	30 min.
2017	PIANO TRIO No. 4	violin, cello and piano	15 min.
1997/2017	10 PRELUDES	theremin and piano	17 min.
2018	Twenty-Four Preludes for Viola and Piano	viola and piano	45 min.
2018	LABYRINTH	piano solo	50 min.
2019	SYMPHONY No. 4 "Arctica"	piano, mixed choir and orchestra	44 min.
2019	GOETIA "In umbra lucis"	choir and string quartet	1 hr. 30 min.
2019	DIABELLICAL WALTZ	piano solo	4 min.
2019	EVE'S LAMENT "O Flowers, That Never Will Grow"	orchestra	13 min.
2019	SONATA No. 4 "Fractured Dreams"	violin and piano	30 min.
2020	STRING QUARTET No. 9 "Thanksgiving"	string quartet	19 min.
2021	CONCERTO FOR VIOLONCELLO AND ORCHESTRA "Diary of a Madman"	cello and orchestra	35 min.
2022	SYMPHONY No. 6 “Vessels of Light”	cello, orchestra and choir	
