= Otaku no Musume-san =

Japanese manga series

- Otaku no Musume-san manga cover

おたくの娘さん
- Manga
- Written by: Stu-Hiro
- Published by: Fujimi Shobo
- Magazine: Monthly Dragon Age
- Original run: 2006 – 2011
- Volumes: 11

Otaku no Musume-san (おたくの娘さん; lit. 'Otaku's Daughter' or 'Your Daughter') is a Japanese manga series by Stu-Hiro, first serialized in Fujimi Shobo's shōnen manga magazine Monthly Dragon Age in 2006. The last chapter was released in the 11th issue of Monthly Dragon Age on October 8, 2011.

The series follows a 26-year-old otaku, who is suddenly visited by a young girl claiming to be his daughter.

== Characters ==
Kouta Morisaki (守崎 耕太, Morisaki Kouta)
Kouta Morisaki is a young man with stereotypical otaku interests. He works as an assistant manga artist for Sousuke Morita for a living. In high school , he slept with Nozomi Yukimura and lost contact with her ever since. He eventually discovers she had given birth to his daughter, Kanau Yukimura, when she appears at his doorstep. As they live together, Kouta begins to place her above his otaku interests and develops as a father and discarding some of his otaku hobbies.
Kouta is attracted to Taeko Morita and confesses his feelings to her only to discover she is married to Sousuke Morita. With support from his daughter and Sousuke, Kouta aims for a career as a professional manga artist.

Kanau Yukimura (幸村 叶, Yukimura Kanau)
Kanau Yukimura is the 10 (recently 9) year old daughter of Kouta Morisaki and Nozomi Yukimura (though her birthday is on Feb 29, making her technically still 2). She begins living with her father after her mother began hiding from debt collectors. Initially disheartened with her father's hobbies, she begins to accept him for who he is and pushes him to try more ordinary things. She also has a strong desire to gain the autographs of famous people.
Later in the series, Kanau adopts a homeless samoyed who is named Souichiro-san (ソーイチローさん, Souichiroo-san) by the tenants; His name is based on the manga series Maison Ikkoku. It is also revealed she has a little half-brother named Tsukamu.

Taeko Morita (森田 妙子, Morita Taeko; Maiden Name (麻生 妙子) Asou Taeko)
Taeko Morita is the manager of the Higansou apartment. She is a well-endowed, thick-headed, 19-year-old high school student who is usually mistaken to be in her late twenties. She studies the otaku hobbies of her tenants so that she can relate to them better. She resents her mother after witnessing her kiss with Sousuke Morita and was a delinquent in the past due to this reason.
It was later revealed that she was adopted by Sousuke after her grandfather's death, and eventually marries him.

Haruka Arisaka (有坂 遥, Arisaka Haruka)
Haruka is an assistant manga artist for Sousuke Morita and resides in the Higansou apartment. She goes to the same school as Taeko whom she is very close to. Haruka has an inferiority complex with her sister who is a successful manga artist. Struggling to free herself from her sister's shadow, she quit high school in order to focus on her career as a manga artist under the pen name Harurun (ハルルン).
Initially disliking Kouta Morisaki, she begins to develop feelings for him as well. Soon, she develops more confidences in herself and her work.

Chihiro Nitta (新田 千尋, Nitta Chihiro)
Chihiro Nitta is a residence of the Higansou apartment and is friends with Kouta Morisaki since highschool. A dedicated lolicon with no interest in older women, he has targeted Kanau Yukimura many times before. He jumps from job to job, usually working in a profession near children. Whenever he consumes sweets, his libido is eliminated completely rendering him harmless.
Despite his lunacy, Chihiro is very insightful of people.
He was secretly in contact with Kanau's mother, Nozomi Yukimura, whom he grew up in an orphanage with.

Sousuke Morita (森田 宗助, Morita Sousuke)
Sousuke Morita is a famous manga artist known under his pen name Clearasil☆Shinra (クレアラシル☆森羅). He was inspired to become a manga artist after Taeko Morita commented on one of his works which he drew to cheer her up. Despite being married, it was confirmed that he is still a virgin.

Nozomi Yukimura (幸村 望, Yukimura Nozomi)
Nozomi Yukimura is Kanau Yukimura's mother. She is a year older than Kouta, and was the one who seduced him in highschool. After acquiring a large debt, she sends Kanau to live with Kouta and has been on the run while working off her debt.
It is later revealed that Nozomi initially sent Kanau to be with Tsukamu's father, until Kanau insisted she wanted to meet her own father. Therefore, Nozomi had no intention of ever telling Kouta about her and if it weren't for Kanau, he would have never known he had a daughter.
She is secretly in contact with Chihiro Nitta to gather information on her daughter.
She is revealed to be an orphan after the deaths of his parents in a car accident. It is later revealed she did not love Kouta, and only used him to make Chihiro jealous, as she was in love with him since childhood, but could never get his attention due to the fact that he was a lolicon.

Kimiko Asou (麻生 公子, Asou Kimiko)
Kimiko Asou is Taeko Morita's mother who works as a hostess. She often appears after work, still wearing a Hostess fantasy costume. She becomes bored with things easily, which seems to be the reason for her promiscuity. Even though she and Taeko are not on good terms, she still sends her money in child support in an attempt to fulfill her role as a parent.
In her past, her mother left her with her father whom neglected her since childhood. When Kimiko became pregnant with Taeko, she attempted to commit suicide, forcing her father to realize the consequence of his neglect. In order to repent for it, he offers to raise Taeko for her.

Mami Kitamura (北村 真美, Kitamura Mami; (Maiden Name (守崎 真美) Morisaki Mami))
Mami Kitamura is Kouta Morisaki's sister who is married to Kitamura Kenya. She works as a model and continued to model even when pregnant. She later gives birth to a girl named Saori. She is very nosey and has good eye for detail allowing her to instantly discern Kanau to be Kouta's daughter.
She is also ecologically minded, knowing that the price tag doesn't determine an item's quality.

Serio
She is friends with Kanau, whom she met at the Comiket, and became quick friends due to their father's similarities. She is often portrayed with a stoic expression and was the person who bought Haruka's doujin many years prior to the series. She is skilled at making cosplay outfits and is able to get someone's measurements just by hugging them.

== List of volumes ==
Original Japanese
Name	Publisher	ISBN	Publication Date
Volume 1	Kadokawa Shoten	ISBN 978-4-04-712473-8	December 1, 2006
Volume 2	Kadokawa Shoten	ISBN 978-4-04-712498-1	June 9, 2007
Volume 3	Kadokawa Shoten	ISBN 978-4-04-712518-6	November 9, 2007
Volume 4	Kadokawa Shoten	ISBN 978-4-04-712549-0	May 9, 2008
Volume 5	Kadokawa Shoten	ISBN 978-4-04-712574-2	November 8, 2008
Volume 6	Kadokawa Shoten	ISBN 978-4-04-712607-7	June 9, 2009
Volume 7	Kadokawa Shoten	ISBN 978-4-04-712633-6	November 9, 2009
Volume 8	Kadokawa Shoten	ISBN 978-4-04-712665-7	May 8, 2010
Volume 9	Kadokawa Shoten	ISBN 978-4-04-712702-9	December 9, 2010
Volume 10	Kadokawa Shoten	ISBN 978-4-04-712726-5	May 9, 2011
Volume 11	Kadokawa Shoten	ISBN 978-4-04-712764-7	December 9, 2011
