= Reincarnation Coliseum =

Japanese manga series

- Reincarnation Coliseum: The Weakest Skill Conquers the Strongest Women and Creates a Harem
- First tankōbon volume cover

転生コロシアム ～最弱スキルで最強の女たちを攻略して奴隷ハーレム作ります～ (Tensei Koroshiamu: Saijaku Sukiru de Saikyō no Onna-tachi o Kōryaku Shite Dorei Hāremu Tsukurimasu)
- Genre: Action; Harem; Isekai
- Manga
- Written by: Saizō Harawata
- Illustrated by: Zunta
- Published by: Fujimi Shobo
- English publisher: NA: Yen Press
- Imprint: Dragon Comics Age
- Magazine: Monthly Dragon Age
- Original run: August 9, 2022 – present
- Volumes: 8
- icon

Reincarnation Coliseum: The Weakest Skill Conquers the Strongest Women and Creates a Harem (転生コロシアム ～最弱スキルで最強の女たちを攻略して奴隷ハーレム作ります～, Tensei Koroshiamu: Saijaku Sukiru de Saikyō no Onna-tachi o Kōryaku Shite Dorei Hāremu Tsukurimasu) is a Japanese manga series written by Saizō Harawata and illustrated by Zunta. It began serialization in Fujimi Shobo's shōnen manga magazine Monthly Dragon Age in August 2022.

== Plot ==
Kouji Mikagami is a student who loves to play video games. One day, a priestess in another world named Zayd summons him, intending to recruit him as a soldier. When it is discovered that his ability is to temporarily copy other people's powers at lower levels, Zayd dismisses him as worthless and sells him as a gladiator, fully expecting him to die. In the arena, the losers are enslaved by the winners, with spells used to turn defeated men into women if needed. Realizing that this world works like a video game, Mikagami uses all his experience to win match after match, slowly building up a harem of defeated opponents as he aims to get revenge on Zayd for discarding him.

== Media ==
=== Manga ===
Written by Saizō Harawata and illustrated by Zunta, Reincarnation Coliseum: The Weakest Skill Conquers the Strongest Women and Creates a Harem began serialization in Fujimi Shobo's shōnen manga magazine Monthly Dragon Age on August 9, 2022. Its chapters have been compiled into eight tankōbon volumes as of September 2026.

During their panel at New York Comic Con 2024, Yen Press announced that they had licensed the series for English publication beginning in April 2025.

No.	Original release date	Original ISBN	English release date	English ISBN
1	January 7, 2023	978-4-04-074832-0	April 22, 2025	979-8-8554-0045-8
1. "Is My Skill Really This Trash...?"; 2. "Who Will Grovel?"; 3. "My First Breeding"; 4. "The Four Flawed Kings"; Bonus
2	July 7, 2023	978-4-04-075043-9	August 26, 2025	979-8-8554-0048-9
5. "A Mind Shaped by Instinct"; 6. "Punishment and Celebration"; 7. "The Problem with Spatial Exchange"; 8. "An Instantaneous Battle"; 9. "A Night of Fun Beautiful Women and Girls"; 10. "Battle Beyond the Surface"
3	February 9, 2024	978-4-04-075319-5	March 24, 2026	979-8-8554-1669-5
11. "Resonance"; 12. "Retaliation"; 13. "She's Got It"; 14. "Strong Management"; 15. "Assassins from the Far East"; 16. "Another Me"
4	September 9, 2024	978-4-04-075590-8	October 27, 2026	979-8-8554-2418-8
5	March 7, 2025	978-4-04-075835-0	—	—
6	October 9, 2025	978-4-04-076088-9; 978-4-04-076087-2 (SE)	—	—
7	February 9, 2026	978-4-04-076263-0	—	—
8	September 9, 2026	978-4-04-076534-1	—	—

=== Other ===
In commemoration of the series reaching over a million copies in circulation, a promotional video featuring narration from Akio Otsuka was uploaded to Kadokawa Corporation's YouTube channel on September 9, 2024.

== Reception ==
By September 2026, the series had over 2.1 million copies in circulation.
