= Zero In =

Japanese manga series

- Zero In Japanese cover

ゼロイン
- Manga
- Written by: Sora Inoue
- Published by: Fujimi Shobo
- Magazine: Monthly Dragon Age
- Original run: June 9, 2003 – January 8, 2011
- Volumes: 12

Zero In (ゼロイン), also romanized as Zeroin, is a Japanese manga series released in 2004 by Sora Inoue, serialized in Monthly Dragon Age magazine, and published in Japan by Kadokowa Comics Dragon Junior. It is published in French by Pika Edition, in German by Egmont Manga & Anime, in South Korea by Haksan Publishing, and in Italy by Flashbook Edizioni.

== Story ==
In the near future, the Japanese National Police Agency covertly establishes an armed division called Minkei or Private Police in order to stamp out rampant crimes involving firearms by heavily armed criminals and terrorists. Minkei's recruitment methods focus mainly on ability and as such is willing to take in anyone who displays the aptitude to handle the work.

Zero In follows the cases and interactions of the Light Knight B squad of Kou, Mikuru, Kina, Fujita, Hana and Shikie. The story mainly focuses on the two main protagonists, Kou and Mikuru, with various chapters dedicated to their partners.

The story emphasizes Mikuru's developing relationship with Kou, her struggle to balance being a high school idol and a Minkei officer, and her physical rivalry with the older Shikie. Over the course of the manga, Kou develops from a weak, bullied boy to a considerably popular and confident young man. He agonizes over his crush on Mikuru and his fear of rejection, and tries to separate his professional life as a Minkei officer from his personal life as a high school student.
