= Monthly Dragon Age =

Japanese manga magazine

- Monthly Dragon Age December 2007 cover
- Categories: Shōnen manga
- Frequency: Monthly
- First issue: April 2003
- Company: Fujimi Shobo
- Country: Japan
- Language: Japanese
- Website: Dragon Age

Monthly Dragon Age (Japanese: 月刊ドラゴンエイジ, Hepburn: Gekkan Doragon Eiji) is a Japanese shōnen manga magazine published by Fujimi Shobo. The magazine began as a combination between Monthly Comic Dragon and Monthly Dragon Junior, two former magazines published by Fujimi Shobo. The first issue was published in April 2003, and the magazine is sold on the ninth of each month. The magazine carries the title "New Age Standard Comic". A special edition version called Dragon Age Pure was active between January 2006 and February 2009.

== Serialized manga ==
- A-kun (17) no Sensō
- Amagi Brilliant Park
- Ange Vierge Linkage
- Armored Core: Tower City Blade
- Black Blood Brothers
- BlazBlue
- Blaze
- Botsuraku Youtei Nanode, Kajishokunin wo Mezasu
- Bremen
- Chanto Suenai Kyūketsuki-chan
- Chrome Shelled Regios Missing Mail
- Chrono Crusade
- Croisée in a Foreign Labyrinth
- Date A Live
- Death March to the Parallel World Rhapsody
- Demon Heart
- Demonizer Zilch
- Densetsu no Yūsha no Densetsu
- Densha Gakuen Mohamohagumi
- Devel 17 Hōkago no Kyōsenshi
- Diebuster
- Dolls Fall
- Dorotea: Majo no Kanazuchi
- Dragons Rioting
- D.Y.N. Freaks
- Full Metal Panic! Σ
- Galaxy Angel
- Game of Familia
- Goshūshō-sama Ninomiya-kun
- Gosick
- Gun-Ota ga Mahou Sekai ni Tensei shitara, Gendai Heiki de Guntai Harem wo Tsukucchaimashita!?
- Gun X Clover
- Hageruya!
- Hekikai no AiON
- Higanbana no Saku Yoru ni
- High School DxD
- Highschool of the Dead
- Hisone to Masotan
- Iinari! Aibure-shon
- Isekai Tenseisha Goroshi -Cheat Slayer-
- Itsuka Tenma no Kuro Usagi
- Kamen no Maid Guy
- Kanon
- Karin
- Kaze no Stigma
- Kiyoshirō Denki File
- Kōkaku no Regiosu
- Konosuba
- Kore wa Zombie Desu ka?
- Kyoshiro and the Eternal Sky
- Lemon ni Vitamin C wa Sorehodo Fukumareteinai
- Lolita Complex Phoenix (aka Lolicon Phoenix) (created by Satoru Matsubayashi, who also authored Haijin-sama no End Contents in Young Ace.)
- Maburaho
- Maken-ki! (continued here after the cancelation of Dragon Age Pure)
- Marianas Densetsu
- Mei no Naisho
- Mizore no Kyōshitsu
- Mizuiro Splash
- Namara! My Love
- Nodoka Nobody
- Omamori Himari
- Ore Fetish: Ichigo-chan Ki o Tsukete
- Orufiina|Orufiina Saga
- Otaku no Musume-san
- Pixy Gale
- Precarious Woman Executive Miss Black General
- Reimondo
- Reincarnation Coliseum
- Rocket Knights
- Rune Factory 2
- Saikin, Imōto no Yōsu ga Chotto Okaishiin Da Ga.
- Sasami: Mahou Shoujo Club
- Satōgashi no Dangan wa Uchinukenai
- Scrapped Princess
- Seitokai no Ichizon
- Shinigami to Chocolate Parfait
- Slayers Evolution-R
- Slayers Revolution
- So, I Can't Play H!
- Sōkō no Strain
- Someday's Dreamers
- Sunday Without God
- Supa Supa
- Tai-Madō Gakuen 35 Shiken Shōtai
- Tenchi Muyo!
- Tengoku kara Miteita Umi
- Tetsunagi Kooni
- The Third
- Trapped in a Dating Sim: The World of Otome Games is Tough for Mobs
- Triage X (ongoing)
- Trinity Seven (ongoing)
- Tsubame Shindorōmu
- Tsuiteru Kanojo
- Unlimited Wings
- Variante
- Yaeka no Karte
- Yami ni Koishita Hitsuji-chan
- Zero In
