= Twenty-Four Preludes for Piano (Auerbach) =

Twenty-Four Preludes for Piano (Op. 41) is a set of 24 preludes composed by Russian emigre composer Lera Auerbach in 1999. The work alternates between major and minor, following the progression of relative minor starting from C major and concluding on D minor. The work was commissioned by Tom and Vivian Waldeck in collaboration with the Caramoor International Music Festival, and is dedicated to the Waldecks. The premiere was given on 23 July 1999 in New York, by the composer herself.

The piece takes 39 minutes in a standard performance.

== Form ==
The long-range form follows the tonal progression of the relative minor, the descending minor-third key that is associated with every major key. Also, the work oscillates between major and minor throughout the work, while the tempo markings do not indicate any pattern and are instead tied to the individual key itself.

1. Moderato in C major
2. Presto in A minor
3. Moderato in G major
4. Appassionato – Nostalgico in E minor
5. Andantino sognante in D major
6. Chorale in B minor
7. Andante in A major
8. Presto in F♯ minor
9. Allegretto in E major
10. Largo in C♯ minor
11. Misterioso in B major
12. Allegro bruto in G♯ minor
13. Andante in F♯ major
14. Allegretto in E♭ minor
15. Moderato in D♭ major
16. Allegro ma non troppo, tragico in B♭ minor
17. Adagio tragico in A♭ major
18. Grave in F minor
19. Adagio religioso in E♭ major
20. Misterioso in C minor
21. Allegro moderato in B♭ major
22. Andante in G minor
23. Allegretto in F major
24. Grandioso in D minor

== Recordings ==
- 2004: Academy of Music, Lera Auerbach (piano)
- 2015: Centaur Records, Inc., Eli Kalman (piano)

== Further links ==
- Score (Editions Sikorski/Exempla Nova)
- Performance Guide for 24 Preludes for Piano (Nezhdanova-Cunningham, 2017)
