= Demonizer Zilch =

Japanese manga series

- The cover of the first volume of the series.

神殺姫ヂルチ (Kamigoroshihime Djiruchi)
- Genre: Dark fantasy
- Manga
- Written by: Milan Matra
- Published by: Fujimi Shobo
- English publisher: NA: Yen Press
- Magazine: Monthly Dragon Age
- Original run: September 9, 2014 – September 8, 2017
- Volumes: 5

Demonizer Zilch (Japanese: 神殺姫(かみごろしひめ)ヂルチ, Hepburn: Kamigoroshihime Djiruchi) is a Japanese manga series written and illustrated by Milan Matra. The series is licensed by Yen Press in North America.

== Plot ==
Sixteen-year-old Haruomi Io (射緒(イオ) 春臣, Io Haruomi) is haunted by dreams of how when he was younger his mother, sister, and childhood friend all died in a tragic accident. One day, Haruomi has an inexplicable pain in his chest, and is attacked shortly afterwards by a girl. After he is able to escape from her, he encounters another girl, who shows signs of being surprised to see him. The second girl is even more shocked when Haruomi's eyes begin to glow after he has another fit, this time in the form of a massive headache. She is then ordered by her boss to kill Haruomi, but he is rescued by a demon (also referred to as a "branch" (枝, Eda)) named Zilch (ヂルチ, Djiruchi). Zilch shares a kiss with Haruomi that infuses his body and strange powers. Haruomi soon finds himself caught in the middle of a war between demons and a religious order called the "Seventh Gospel Organization" (第七福音機関, Dai Nana Fukuin Kikan). He later learns that a company (named Goetia) that his father worked for had found religious artifacts which included King Solomon's ring that they used to fuse unbaptized female children with one of 72 demons of King Solomon. As events unfold, Haruomi also discovers what actually happened to his lost loved ones.

== Characters ==
Haruomi Io
The main protagonist is sixteen-year-old Haruomi, who initially feels powerless to protect those that are precious to him. He was involved in an accident as a child where he lost loved ones so has retained guilt through the years. Encountering Zilch changes his life as she reassures him that he is "not powerless" and vows to protect him. Haruomi becomes involved with Seventh Gospel Organization and takes the role of Annihilator to hunt down rogue devils. Haruomi later learns that his father and Levi were researchers of the Goetia institute but left in disgust when the company's desire for power grew. An unexplained explosion within the company soon followed. He enrolls at Kanmeikan High School while tracking down a "branch" named Hato which ends in success. He also learns that before his father left he had infused King Solomon's ring inside of him which gave Harumoi the ability to nullified and some control over all 72 demons. He has stated to Astaroth inside of Zilch that he wants to grant her wish. After Harumoi's father's death, he resorts in rescuing Murohime and Zilch from their burden, and went back to everyday life at school regardless of the love triangle.
Zilch Kanoa
The lead heroine and "29th Branch" that is the incarnation of the Demon Archduke Astaroth. Zilch is a young girl with pink twin tail hair, having been born within the past two years from Goetia. She is connected by an engagement with Haruomi, having pierced a <Thron> that bears a caduceus seal onto him. Able to manifest more power than ever, she can repulse and distort space around her, and disrupt kinetic energy. She enrolls Kanmeikan Middle School, much to her dismay of not being close to Haruomi. Haruomi discerns that Zilch is somewhat familiar to him, later revealed Haruomi's deceased sister Ayana harbors Zilch's body. Ayana had experience a ravaged event and her mind was reconstruct into the Astaroth. Astaroth's goal is to reclaim the status of an angel by doing good deeds for others, while the human side of Zilch appears to have feelings towards Haruomi. In contrast to Zilch, Ayana is devoted to her big brother, but has a malice and yandere behavior whenever someone gets Haruomi's attention. While maneuvering Zilch's body, Ayana attempts to kill Murohime to have Haruomi all to herself.
Murohime Yakagi
Murohime is a buxom nun who starts out as an annihilator in the Seventh Gospel Organization. She initially enrolls at the local high school with Haruomi on an undercover mission to find "branches" (female humans fused with demons). It is later revealed that she is really Haruomi's childhood friend "Akino Kiriba" who in fact had survived being tested upon by Goetia. The testing involved a failed attempt to use her body as a vessel for the archangel Lucifer. Due to the failure, Murohime only has memories from three years ago all involving the church from where she got her current name. She has since been seeing visions of her younger self who tries to get her to remember the past. When Akino finally recovers her memories she looks back on how she had been orphaned and isolated until meeting Haruomi and Ayana. She developed feelings for Haruomi before facing an unsuccessful murder attempt by her jealous friend Ayana. Flashing forward, Haruomi confesses his love to her shortly before the series climax with ends in a victory. Akino winds up leaving the Seventh Gospel Organization for lying to her in favor of becoming a student, but chooses to keep the name "Murohime." Despite declaring herself as Haruomi's "girlfriend" she continues to fight with Zilch for his affections.
Hato Mitsukuri
Hato is the "4th Branch" that is the incarnation of vengeful ghost marquis Gamigin. She had pierced a <Thron> into a school teacher named Ms. Mishino while in hiding, but then extracts it when she is discovered by Haruomi and Murohime. She can cease a person's five senses, and skilled in computer hacking. When Haruomi uses Solomon's ring on her in battle it is revealed that she has an inner desire to live that awakens. Having been spared, she falls in love with Haruomi and pierces him with a new <Thorn> that Zilch later overwritten. Hato once thought of running away with Haruomi to escape the dangers. She soon admits there is no room for her in Haruomi's heart even though the other Branches are persistent.
Tounogi Haime
Tounogi is a confident member of the Seventh Gospel Organization and Shijima's master. Although loyal to the church, he serves a good companionship with Haruomi and Murohime. He has an older sister who is currently abroad at another Goetia institute in Europe as the "56th Branch" the incarnation of Gremory. Like Haruomi, Tounogi hopes to be reunited with his sister someday.
Kurohazumi Shijima
She is Tounogi's Branch and the first one who engages Haruomi in a blunt attack. Shijima is the "25th Branch" that is the incarnation of president of the Dog Kings Glasyalabolas. She specializes in manipulating shadows.

=== Secondary characters ===
Sitri
The "12th Branch" and incarnation of the Sitri. She has cat ears and expresses a deep demeanor before being impaled by Zilch shortly the start of Volume 2. Her real name is unknown. In reality, she has been absorbed into Haroumi via the ring of Solomon and defends him.
Tobari Kemizuka
She is the "14th Branch" the incarnation of the Leraje. Soft-spoken demon archery but she won't hesitate in firing deadly Sagittarius arrows that weary wounds till certain death and allows her traces them, while only she can heal it. She is obedient to commands. After being fatally stabbed by an embodiment of Sitri, Tobari was also absorbed compel into Haroumi. Tobari finds it odd and eventually concedes to Haroumi's well-being.
Evelina Zieliński
She is the "28th Branch" that is the incarnation of Duke of Cruelty Berith. Capable to turn space into her own territory and decapitates victims. Invading the church and captured Haroumi's father under orders of Goetia. She sparks an interest in Haroumi when discovering he is the ring of Solomon and tried to implant him a "Thron" against his will. When facing Zilch's words and separate ideas, Evelina begins to doubt the meaning of freedom or submit to structural collapse. She and Karen temporarily team with Haroumi for his kindness.
Karen Houzumi
A carefree demon that has naked eyes with a star-shape pattern. She is the "69th Branch" incarnation of the Decarabia. Summoning a pentagram circle to teleport and eliminate (including light beam vision) is her power. Karen has an unbroken bond of three, consisting her, Evenlina, and Tobari.
Sophia
A seemingly innocent demon. Sophia helps Zilch and co. infiltration of Goetia. Her incarnation status is the "Magquis of Flame or Amon" the "7th Branch". Sophia can emit enormous flares and create flaming birds. Has a friendly relationship with Haroumi. She is more interested in living a free life other than following the Beelzebub's customs.
Hellentza Fitzengahen
A powerful demon who can trigger seismic events. Her incarnation of "Lord of the Flies, Beelzebub" ingrained makes her the few ineffective of the Solomon's ring. She is Zilch's former friend. After assassinating Goetia's eastern laboratory compound, she controls like ninety percent Branches as her followers. Her intent is to execute something called 'Project Eden' other than the previous Qliphoth operation, and search for her self-proclaimed Lucifer. Unearthing Murohime's true identity, Hellentza negotiates her into bring forth the Armageddon upon the world, although Zilch's second personality gets in the way of the Branches' goal of reaching heaven.

== Release ==
Milan Matra launched Demonizer Zilch in the October issue of Fujimi Shobo's shōnen manga magazine Monthly Dragon Age on September 9, 2014, and ended it on September 8, 2017. The series was released as five tankōbon volumes between March 9, 2015, and November 9, 2017. Yen Press announced their license to the series at Anime Expo 2015 on July 5, 2015.

=== Volumes ===
No.	Original release date	Original ISBN	English release date	English ISBN
1	March 9, 2015	978-4-04-070510-1	February 23, 2016	978-0-316-39414-7
1. "The "Branch" Girl" ("枝"の少女, "Eda" no Shōjo); 2. "The "Thorn" Engagement" ("棘"の契約(エンゲージ), "Toge" no Engēji); 3. ""Watcher Egg"" ("エグリゴリの卵", "Egurigori no Tamago"); 4. ""The 8th Sacrament of the Guilty"" ("罪人の第8柲跡"(サクラメント・オブ・ギルテイ), Sakuramento Obu Girutei); 5. ""The Dog King's Prime Minister"" ("犬(けん)王(おう)の総(そう)裁(さい)", Ken-Ō no Sōsai); 6. ""The Archduke of Fear & the Ring of Solomon"" ("恐怖公"とソロモン王の指輪, "Kyōfu Kō" to Soromon-Ō no Yubiwa)
2	December 5, 2015	978-4-04-070787-7	September 27, 2016	978-0-316-36184-2
7. ""Annihilator""; 8. "The Fake Transfer Students"; 9. "School Campus Demon"; 10. "Secret Investigation"; 11. "Vengeful Ghost Marquis"; 12. "At the Training Site"; 13. "The "Branches'" Assault"
3	June 9, 2016	978-4-04-070917-8	August 22, 2017	978-0-316-47463-4
14. "The Blue Arrow Marquis"; 15. "Tell the Truth, and the Demons Will Come"; 16. "Whispers"; 17. "Mark of Caduceus"; 18. "Infiltrate Goetia"; 19. "Rescue"; 20. "Scarsick of Death"
4	January 7, 2017	978-4-04-072145-3	November 14, 2017	978-0-31-644343-2
21. "The Director's Office"; 22. "Attonement"; 23. "Lord of the Flies"; 24. "Those Left Behind"; 25. "Corrosion"; 26. "Eclipse Level"; 27. "Murohime Recovered"
5	November 9, 2017	978-4-04-072492-8	October 30, 2018	978-1-97-538089-2
28. "Memory Dismantling"; 29. "Parting"; 30. "Pandemonium"; 31. "Hato Mitsukuri"; 32. "Ayana Attacks"; 33. "Duel"; 34. "Astaroth Zilch"; 35. "Together with Both"

== Reception ==
The English adaptation of Demonizer Zilch has received negative reviews from various sources. Sean Gaffney from Manga Bookshelf was rather disappointed with the manga, as it was almost exactly like a manga he had just read. He referred to the main character Haruomi as "passive and aloof", but did go on to say that the fanservice was not "mind-numbingly offensive". Jason Thompson from Otaku USA also reviewed the first volume, criticizing the artwork for making the characters appear doll-like. He also felt that the name dropping of Christian references and the love triangle were unoriginal. Thompson indicated that he had disliked the author's previous work, Omamori Himari, but did not go into detail on the matter. Despite the criticism, the first volume of the English translation ranked at number 7 on The New York Times manga Best Seller list for the week of March 20, 2016.
