= Bakugan: Armored Alliance =

- Season 2
- Japanese promotional image
- No. of episodes: 52 (104 segments)

Release
- Original network: Teletoon (CA); Cartoon Network (US); YouTube and Amazon Prime Video (JP)
- Original release: February 16, 2020 – January 3, 2021

Series chronology
- ← Previous; Bakugan: Battle Planet Next → Bakugan: Geogan Rising

Bakugan: Armored Alliance (爆(ばく)丸(がん)アーマードアライアンス, Bakugan Āmādo Araiansu) is the second season of the Japanese animated television series Bakugan: Battle Planet. Like the first, Armored Alliance is directed by Kazuya Ichikawa for TMS Entertainment, Nelvana Enterprises and Spin Master Entertainment. It was formally announced on October 15, 2019, and consists of 104 eleven-minute episodes.

The season debuted in Canada on Teletoon on February 16, 2020, and was later rebroadcast on YTV starting March 6, 2020. Cartoon Network began airing the show in the United States on March 1, 2020, with episodes made available through its video-on-demand platforms prior to their linear broadcast. In Japan, Armored Alliance began streaming on Amazon Prime Video, YouTube and a number of other services beginning April 3, 2020.

== Voice cast ==
=== Main ===
- Jonah Wineberg as Dan Kouzo
- Deven Mack as Wynton Styles
- Sharjil Rasool as Ajit, a Aurelus brawlers.

=== Supporting ===
- Stacey DePass as Ebony
- Ana Sani as Emily, Ma

=== Bakugan ===
- Jason Deline as Dragonoid "Drago", the Bakugan partner of Dan Kouzo
- Ucal Shillingford as Trox
- Jeremiah Sparks as Pharol, Ajit's partners

== Episode list ==
No. overall	No. in season	English Title Japanese title	Original release date	Japanese release date	U.S. viewers (millions)
101	1a	"The Mysterious Boy"; Transliteration: "Nazo no Shōnen" (Japanese: 謎の少年)	February 16, 2020 (CAN); March 1, 2020 (US) (Note: These episodes were first released on the Cartoon Network app and video-on-demand services on February 28, 2020.)	April 3, 2020	0.17
A few months have passed after saving Earth and Vestroia from Tiko’s rampage. The Awesome Brawlers (AB) have become world famous heroes and Bakugan-mania has begun to sweep the globe. In addition to their heroic acts, a tournament is being held in their honor. Everything starts off with Dan rushing to Studio D to meet up with his friends because the Mayor is rewarding them for their heroism when they saved Earth and Vestroia from Tiko’s wrath. They will also be competing in the tournament as well after the ceremony. Since they don’t want to show up to the tournament looking fancy, they decide to go as their true normal selves. Meanwhile, a new Brawler named Ajit and his Bakugan Pharol arrive in town looking for Dan because they want to battle him in the upcoming tournament held today. At the tournament arena (which is being hosted by Kravitz and Benton), the AB are rewarded by the Mayor of Los Volmos with Medals of Honor for their courage and bravery. After the ceremony, they are about to face five Brawlers in their upcoming matches. Benton announces that following the incident with Tiko, the use of Bakugan for commercial, industrial, and military purposes have become strictly regulated by law, meaning that there is now an outright ban on using devices to control Bakugan. Only Brawlers who have the ability to naturally control them are permitted to do so. Since then, Bakugan battling has been reborn as a sporting competition. He is determined to spread the culture of Bakugan worldwide in order to keep the peace going throughout the world. The AB prepare to face their challengers, but Dan is shocked when he discovers that China Riot has entered the tournament. Riot explains that the reason they defeated Tiko was because they had her help, and that she is determined to prove herself the strongest Brawler there is by battling Dan in this match. Dan accepts her challenge, knowing that they’re going to defeat her anyway. The AB battle their opponents in their respective matches. However, before Dan and Riot can begin their battle, Pharol arrives and interrupts it, much to their shock. Everyone else also becomes shocked by the presence of this Golden Bakugan as well. Furious that Pharol got in the way of their battle that they were about to begin, China Riot battles him, but is easily defeated soon afterwards. Ajit soon arrives and challenges Dan to a battle.
102	1b	"A New Power"; Transliteration: "Gōrudo Bakugan Faroru" (Japanese: ゴールド爆丸ファロル)	February 16, 2020 (CAN); March 1, 2020 (US)	April 3, 2020	0.17
After crashing the tournament, Ajit challenges Dan to a battle, leaving him in shock and awe, as well as the rest of the AB who are also shocked about the presence of Pharol since he’s a Golden Bakugan in which they have no idea where he came from. Dan demands to know who he is, but Ajit still tries to get him to battle him. Eventually, Dan accepts his challenge. However, before they can begin their battle, security arrives in an attempt to apprehend Ajit for crashing the tournament, but he soon flees while they chase after him. Dan also joins the pursuit, determined to know who that Brawler really is. Ajit manages to evade the guards and finds Dan chasing after him. Eventually, Dan loses him. The rest of the AB rendezvous with him after finishing their matches. Dan starts to believe that he didn’t win his match since Ajit interrupted it in the first place, but his friends cheer him up anyway. Ajit confronts the AB, revealing that he saw Dan and Drago battle before, which was exciting for him and hasn’t stopped thinking about it ever since. Dan challenges him to a battle which he accepts. The beginning gets off to a shocking start when Ajit becomes curious about the Drome for example since this is his first time battling. The AB decide to give him a tutorial first on how to really battle. Once he understands everything now, Ajit and Dan begin their battle. During the battle, Dan seems to have the upper hand, but Ajit, remembering what they taught him, has proven to be a strong opponent for him since Pharol is a Golden Bakugan (and Golden Bakugan are very powerful). Worried that he’ll lose, Dan attempts to evolve Drago, but is unable to do so. Shun explains that after the Golden Drome covered the entire Earth, the properties of the Core Cells have changed, meaning that they can no longer evolve their Bakugan because they can’t draw energy from the Core Cells anymore. Still, Dan doesn’t care if he’s facing a Golden Bakugan like Pharol; he and Drago are still determined to defeat Ajit despite how strong he really is. Suddenly, a strange phenomenon occurs that summons a Bakucore, one that Dan has never seen before. Nevertheless, he uses it on Drago that summons a new power-up that has never been seen before, much to everyone’s shock, including Ajit’s. Using that power-up, they nearly defeat Pharol. However, before they can finish the battle, Ajit immediately cuts it short and leaves after thanking Dan and his friends for teaching him how to Bakugan battle for the first time. Although the AB don’t know anything about the new power-up that Dan and Drago summoned before, Dan says that there are lots of new stuff out there that they don’t even know about yet. He knows deep down that Bakugan battling will always be the best thing that has ever happened to them, knowing that they’ll learn something new every day.
103	2a	"Baku-Gear"; Transliteration: "Baku-Gia" (Japanese: 爆ギア)	February 23, 2020 (CAN); March 8, 2020 (US)	April 10, 2020	0.25
Wynton reveals to the AB that he secretly filmed Dan and Drago battling Ajit and his Golden Bakugan Pharol, including the power-up that Drago used. Reviewing the video, they are disappointed when they find out that Wynton got a bad shot of everything, especially Dan who still doesn’t know the name of that Brawler. The others don’t know as well, but Dan hopes that he’ll battle him again after he learns how to summon the power-up again. The AB decide to dub it “Baku-gear,” then they proceed into figuring out how to summon it. Dan and Wynton battle each other, hoping to summon the Bakucores that will unlock the Baku-gear while Lia is filming, hoping to get a clear shot. Dan tries to summon the Baku-gear, but can’t seem to do so. Drago theorizes that when they summoned it in the first place, he felt an immense power, leaving the AB suspicious about it. Suddenly, a new Brawler shows up and introduces himself as Trey, whom the AB recognize from their school as the Junior Chess Champion, dubbed as “The Super Chess Boy.” Trey challenges Dan to a battle which he accepts after Wynton offers to step down and let him take his place, and after being encouraged by his friends. During the battle, Dan accidentally gets distracted when he still tries to figure out how to summon the Baku-gear, much to his friends' dissatisfaction. Luckily, he regains his focus and continues the battle after Drago snaps him back into action. The AB become shocked when they discover Aay watching the battle as well. He reveals to them that Trey is his younger brother and explains that he gave his Bakugan to him since he can no longer use one because after the events with Tiko, he learned that he can no longer use a device to control them because they are now banned. Trey told him that he wanted to battle, so he taught him everything that he knew in order to defeat Dan and Drago. Trey begins to admire Dan for his courage and bravery and how everyone looks up to him as a hero; but in reality, he was actually causing him to lower his guard before striking Drago hard, giving him the upper hand, having theorized that Dan’s weakness is his ego. He becomes determined to make his brother’s wishes come true by defeating Dan in this battle since he failed to do so in the past. Nearly at the brink of defeat, Dan refuses to give up and successfully triggers the phenomenon again, summoning the Bakucore needed to unlock the Baku-gear in the process. Using his Baku-gear, they defeat Trey at last, but he’s still not sure on how he triggered it in the first place. Trey becomes saddened by his loss, but Aay assures him that he did his best against Dan since that battle surprised him to begin with. Trey approaches Dan and tells him that he will beat him again someday once he’s fully prepared, and advises him to do the same. Dan happily accepts.
104	2b	"Bakugan Rock!"; Transliteration: "Bakugan Rokku" (Japanese: 爆丸ロック)	February 23, 2020 (CAN); March 8, 2020 (US)	April 10, 2020	0.25
The AB review the video of Drago using the Baku-gear in action. Dan starts to believe that he’s the only one who can use Baku-gear, but Lia warns him not to brag about it in order to avoid embarrassing himself. Trox asks Wynton about what Dan had said earlier, but he remains unsure about it since there’s too much info that they don’t understand just yet. Dan suggests that they have a Baku-gear study session right now, but Wynton and Lia tell him that they are busy today, much to his desperation, so he and Drago decide to do it themselves. While walking home, it is revealed that they’ve lied to Dan because they don’t like being around him when he’s full of himself every now and then. Wynton says that he wants to figure out how to unlock Baku-gear before Dan finds out, so he decides to keep it a secret from him while he does research on it, much to Trox’s delight. Suddenly, 2 rockstars named Chad and Chester approach them, having recognized them from the AB who challenge them to a battle (in reality, they seek out Dan and Drago who are the strongest duo in the world). They eventually accept their challenge. During the battle, Wynton and Lia easily gain the upper hand, leaving them at near defeat. Suddenly, 2 Bakucores used for Baku-gear appear in front of Chad and Chester, which they use to power up their Bakugan and regain the advantage, much to Lia and Wynton’s shock. Left at the brink of defeat, Wynton theorizes that their Baku-gear didn’t disappear after they attacked, yet Trox and Pegatrix are still standing. Trox becomes confused on how he’s remaining so calm when they’re about to lose, but Wynton believes that they won’t lose this battle when he starts to explain that he’s been reviewing the video of Dan summoning the Baku-gear over and over again while analyzing him. He theorizes that Baku-gear can only be summoned if they’re on the brink of defeat just like Chad and Chester were before then. Suddenly, 2 Baku-gear Bakucores appear in front of Wynton and Lia which they use to power up their Bakugan. Using their Baku-gear, they successfully defeat Chad and Chester. The rockstar duo soon leave after issuing a rematch with them the next time they meet. The next day, Wynton and Lia review their video of their Baku-gear in action, then they learn that there are reports of Baku-gear Bakucores appearing everywhere. They decide to dub them “Baku-gear Cores” as part of their streamlined name, much to Dan’s complaint since he thought that he and Drago were the only ones that can summon Baku-gear to begin with.
105	3a	"Brawler Headhunting"; Transliteration: "Gurantsu Faibu" (Japanese: グランツファイブ)	March 1, 2020 (CAN); March 15, 2020 (US)	April 17, 2020	0.20
Wynton theorizes to the AB that Baku-gear can only be summoned if they’re on the brink of defeat. Dan theorizes that since evolution isn’t possible for Bakugan anymore, he deduces that Baku-gear has replaced it. Shun suspects that the Golden Drome had something to do with it. Dan challenges Shun to a battle since they know how to activate Baku-gear now, but before they can do so, he is soon contacted by Toshi asking for his assistance at once. He then leaves after promising him that they will battle later. Lia explains to Dan that Kazami International Holdings is in a tight spot right now ever since Shun’s father stepped down as president and is now traveling the world doing volunteer work, and that Masato is the new president now. Because of this, Toshi has been put in charge of the Los Volmos office and Shun has decided to help him since he’s way more familiar with the city. While traveling to their destination, Toshi explains to Shun that he needs to “entertain” a special guest that is visiting Los Volmos today who happens to be a business partner of the company. Upon arrival, he introduces him to Noah Schmidt, the heir to the Schmitt Corporation in Germany who will be their new company president someday, and the one who has asked for him to be his tour guide to begin with. Toshi advises Shun to show him a good time because it is the best way to further business relations. Meeting with Noah, Shun takes him around Los Volmos and shows him the sites, but he doesn’t seem that happy to begin with. Believing that he might be interested in Bakugan, Shun takes Noah to Pin Point Park where the “Great Collision” took place. Noah becomes impressed with what Shun has shown him and reveals his own Bakugan to him to begin with. Satisfied that he’s interested in Bakugan, Shun takes him to the places that the AB often go to. During dinner, Noah tells Shun that he needs him on his side when he introduces him to his Bakugan team known as The Glanz Five, and asks him to join them, much to his shock. It is revealed that when Shun was showing him around town, he was observing him all this time, and knew that he figured out his liking to Bakugan to start with. Shun soon realizes that Noah only came here to recruit him away from the AB and have him join his team. He refuses to join the Glanz Five due to his loyalty to the AB, but they attempt to pressure him into joining them by presenting him with a Tumpee gift that’s only available in Germany. However, Shun resists and refuses to accept their gift, but Noah warns him that his company will stop doing business with Kazami Holdings if he doesn’t accept his offer. He then challenges Shun to a battle where if he loses, he’ll have to join The Glanz Five. Shun says that if he wins, he’ll have to stop recruiting him onto his team, and continue to do business with the Kazami’s. During the battle, Shun is left at a disadvantage and at the brink of defeat when he becomes outmatched by the other members, knowing that Noah’s strength comes from his team. Refusing to give up and determined to win this battle, Shun successfully summons a Baku-Gear Core and powers up Hydorous with Baku-gear, giving him the advantage needed to win. Using his Baku-gear, Shun successfully defeats The Glanz Five at last. In the aftermath, although he still refuses to join Noah’s team, he tells him that he can still battle him anytime. Noah happily accepts, saying that he intends to build up his strength before they meet again. Shun say’s that he’s looking forward to it.
106	3b	"Lightning's Entrance Exam"; Transliteration: "Raitoningu, Gakkōheiku" (Japanese: ライトニング、学校へ行く)	March 1, 2020 (CAN); March 15, 2020 (US)	April 17, 2020	0.20
Dan struggles with his homework even with his friends' help since he prefers battling. This makes Lightning think about wanting to go to school too. Through Pheadrus’s translations, he tells the AB that he wants to go to school too, much to their shock. He says that it’s not fair that they get to go to school, and that he wants to have fun by going with them. They tell him that dogs like him can’t go to school, only kids can because the rules don’t allow it, saddening Lightning in the process. At school, the AB are shocked when they discover Lightning in their classroom, much to their teachers' disapproval. Dan tries to send Lightning home, but he continues to try to be like the other students by doing school related things, which begins to infuriate him. The others attempt to persuade him to go home as well, but Lightning refuses. He then challenges Dan to a battle, which gets the attention of the other students in class. Through Howlkor’s translations, Lightning says that if he loses, he’ll go home. Eventually, Dan accepts his challenge because he’s tired of getting into trouble with his teacher because of him. Dan and Lightning battle hard against each other. However, Dan’s attack begins to emerge onto the school accidentally. On Lightning’s urging, Howlkor takes the hit, saving the school in the process, and the AB soon realize that Lightning didn’t dodge on purpose. Confronting them, he says that he doesn’t want this school to be destroyed because it is an amazing place to be, and that he wants to learn and play with everyone there. Howlkor becomes determined to make Lightning’s wish come true by winning this battle once and for all. Lightning successfully summons a Baku-gear Core, powers up Howlkor with Baku-gear, and defeats Drago at last. The teacher confronts Lightning, but instead of being mad at him, she begins to show appreciation towards him and realizes that he really does want to go to school like all the other students (even though he’s a dog), having understood his feelings. She decides to make Lightning an official student at the AB’s school, much to his delight, and much to the AB’s shock. The next day, Lightning starts his first day of school; however, he suddenly falls asleep in class. Dan soon realizes that Lightning hasn’t changed since coming here, but it’s okay though, because this is how he is and always will be.
107	4a	"Trouble Busters!"; Transliteration: "Toraburu Basutā!" (Japanese: トラブルバスター！)	March 8, 2020 (CAN); March 22, 2020 (US)	April 24, 2020	0.19
The world’s quietest town is experiencing some unexplained noises, which the Mayor hasn’t found out about yet and is determined to find out where they are coming from. Much to his shock, he discovers what he believes is a Bakugan. Meanwhile after winning a battle, Dan announces their newest project to the public where the AB are offering their help to anyone with troubles or questions concerning Bakugan, dubbing it as “Bakugan Trouble Busters.” This prompts the Mayor to call for their assistance. Arriving in the town on their first Trouble Busters mission, they meet the Mayor who explains to them about the mysterious noises that sound like a Bakugan battle coming from somewhere in town. He tells them that he saw a Bakugan, but he doesn’t know where they’re battling. He says that they’re striving to become the world's quietest town and advises the AB to track down the source of these noises as quickly as possible. They start asking the people around town, but they tell them that they haven’t heard anything lately. However, one of them says that they’re coming from within the earth on the edge of town. After looking over the info they gathered, the AB deduce that the noises are coming from underground somewhere. Dan suspects it’s from Bakugan battling, but Shun claims that there’s no battles going on right now, which doesn’t explain the sounds coming from underground. Suddenly, they meet a trio of Brawlers who recognize the AB where one of them introduces himself as Rick. They offer to let them in on their secret when they show them an underground passage that they found while playing. Heading inside, Rick reveals to them that this place used to be a storage area for potatoes, until they were shipped to different stores. Since then, it has become the perfect place for them to play in, and to Bakugan battle since they’re not allowed to make noise or play outside as ordered by the Mayor. They tell the AB that he heard them battling and beg for them to keep this a secret from him. Dan tells them that they can’t do that because everyone will find out about this place eventually. However, they agree to talk to the Mayor and make him understand everything about this. Rick decides to put his trust in Dan, hoping that they’ll make it right. Returning to the Mayor, they inform him about the kids playing underground, much to his delight. In addition to this, he promises them that he won’t do anything to punish them. The AB return to the underground hideout where they tell Rick and his friends that the Mayor made a promise to them that they can keep playing here, much to their happiness. Suddenly, a large driller starts drilling into their hideout, and the Mayor soon appears and thanks the AB for leading him here, making Rick realize that they inadvertently led him here. He reveals to them that he plans to fill in this place immediately. The AB attempt to reason with Rick and his friends, trying to explain that they didn’t mean to lead him here, but the trio, feeling betrayed, initiate a battle with them. Dan battles them, still determined to make things right by stopping the demolition work. He advises Wynton and Shun to stop the driller where they have Trox and Hydorous push it back up to the surface and away from the site. This gets the attention of the people as they watch the AB’s broadcast and become unimpressed with what is happening here. In the battle, Dan still tries to reason with the trio, but they still don’t believe him. Knowing that there’s no other choice, he defeats them quickly. The Mayor confronts the trio and threatens to confiscate their Bakugan, much to the AB’s annoyance, but the townspeople show up and reveal his deception to the town on their livestream, which was filmed by Lia of course. They begin to explain that he’s gone too far with trying to make this town the world's quietest town. They state that just because they enjoy peace and quiet doesn’t mean that the entire town should be like that. They want their children to play and have fun wherever and whenever they want to. This leads to the end of the Mayor's plan once and for all. In the aftermath, the town has been modified as the people celebrate their new way of living with all the laughter, excitement, and fun going on here. Although the Mayor is not satisfied with all the noise going on in this town, he decides that it will be reborn as the world’s most fun town.
108	4b	"French Fry Wars"; Transliteration: "Ōsamu Wan Kaisan!?" (Japanese: オーサム・ワン解散！？)	March 8, 2020 (CAN); March 22, 2020 (US)	April 24, 2020	0.19
After Dan and Wynton win a tag team battle, the AB celebrate their victory with snacks. However, they soon get into an argument about who gets to eat the last french fry, except for Shun and Lightning who don’t really care about it. As a result, Dan announces to the public that the AB will be doing things their own way. To prove who's the better Awesome Brawler, Dan, Wynton, and Lia decide to compete for the most video views where each of them will make their own channel, and their own videos. Whoever gets the most views by the end of the day will have the chance to call themselves the Awesome Brawlers. The trio start making their videos on separate channels, but due to a lot of interruptions, they start quarreling with each other, much to Shun’s dissatisfaction. Shun becomes worried about what his friends are going through right now, afraid that they might break up. Drago is determined to not let something so ridiculous like a french fry for example tear them apart. Knowing that he feels the same way as he does, Shun comes up with an idea that just might work. Later in the day, he receives a package that came from the research lab at Kazami International and prepares to put his plan into motion. That night, the trio inadvertently fall asleep, and once they do so, Shun carries out his plan. Dan, Lia, and Wynton soon wake up and discover themselves in the middle of Los Volmos. There, they discover rogue Bakugan attacking the city. They prepare to fight them, but they soon learn that they don’t have their Bakugan with them, and because of that, they flee in terror from them. It is revealed that the trio aren’t actually running from rogue Bakugan, nor are they in the middle of Los Volmos: due to the package that he got from Kazami International Holdings, Shun set them up in a virtual reality world as part of their plan to get them back together again, and they have no idea that none of it is real. In the virtual reality world, the trio soon begin to realize that their fight caused all this trouble. Wynton inadvertently breaks his leg and tells the others to flee, but they refuse to leave him behind (in reality, Wynton isn’t really hurt, he just believes that he is, according to Shun). Continuing to flee, they are soon cornered by a Bakugan, but Dan stands up to it, determined to protect his friends at all cost. Realizing their mistake, they apologize and reconcile with each other. When Shun learns that they finally made up with each other, he sends the Bakugan in to help them. Lia believes that the power of their friendship brought them here for starters. They prepare to face the Bakugan, but they soon find themselves back in the real world. They soon learn that they have been set up by Shun’s “The Awesome Brawlers Break Up” prank, which has also been streaming live. Shun announces to the public about the unbreakable bond that the AB share with each other, saying that they will never break up again, hoping that they will continue to support them. The AB are eventually satisfied with everything now, knowing the fact that they have reconciled with each other was the right thing to do.
109	5a	"The Phantom Thief Comes to Call"; Transliteration: "Kaitō Sutōmu Sanjō!" (Japanese: 怪盗ストーム参上！)	March 15, 2020 (CAN); March 29, 2020 (US)	May 1, 2020	0.20
On the outskirts of Los Volmos, a group of archeologists conduct an archeological expedition by exploring the ruins of an ancient civilization. Dan, who’s curious really wants to find a way to get in there, but Lia says they can’t since this is a restricted area, much to Dan’s complaint. The group heads into the tomb where they discover ancient wall paintings. One of the archeologists accidentally triggers a trap, in which the professor explains that it was meant to get rid of intruders because it's protecting something. The group decides not to go any further due to the dangers and come back later for help, but the professor refuses, saying that bringing more people in here would make his job nearly impossible. He then knocks them out with knockout gas and reveals himself as the phantom thief named Storm who plans to steal the artifact in this tomb. His apprentice is revealed to be Ajit who is working with him to steal the artifact as well. As they head deeper inside, they manage to evade one of the traps. When they reach the room, they locate the artifact where it is revealed to be an ancient statue modeled after a Bakugan. Storm explains that researchers believed that there were Bakugan on Earth in ancient times, and that there are other artifacts that have been discovered in ancient ruins all over the world. He plans to steal it so he can add it to his Bakugan art collection since he’s interested in its artwork. Ajit prepares to retrieve it for him, but Storm stops him due to a trap. In order to disarm it, he gives him a communicator and tells him that they have to activate 2 mechanisms at precisely the same time. Heading into another room, Ajit starts searching for the mechanism and locates it. Meanwhile, the AB learn about the phantom thief and become determined to stop him from stealing the artifact in the tomb. Exploring the tomb, Dan accidentally triggers a trap and falls into it. He continues falling until he ends up in the same room as Ajit and inadvertently triggers another trap that releases a strong gas. He summons Drago to help get him out of there, but even the gas starts to affect him as well, which makes it harder for them to escape. Ajit sees a familiar shadow, unaware that it's Drago to start with, which leads to a blind battle between him and Pharol. The AB learn about the rumbling from underground, believing that it might be Dan down there, but since there’s no way to get to him, they continue to move forward. Back in the room, the Bakugan can’t seem to activate their abilities due to the gas. Determined to escape, Ajit has Pharol conjure up a sand storm which successfully blows the gas away. Both him and Storm then activate the mechanisms at the same time, and successfully disarm the trap. Before Storm can claim the statue, he is soon confronted by the AB, whom he recognizes from their fame. They prepare to battle him, but he decides to take no interest in doing so since he’s a phantom thief, and phantom thieves are not fond of brute force. He states that if the Bakugan were to run rampant here, the ruins would end up destroyed, proving them to be a violation to his sensibilities. He soon retreats for now; however, he inadvertently leaves the statue behind. Although the AB learn his name, they become suspicious about why he would run off without stealing anything at all. Elsewhere, Dan begs for help into getting out of this room that he and Drago are still in following the gas. On the verge of retreat, although Ajit and Storm travel home empty handed, Storm tells him that he’s going to be retrained by having him start from the basics, much to Ajit’s dissatisfaction, knowing that he really is upset about what happened today.
110	5b	"Phantom Thief Ajit"; Transliteration: "Kaitō Ajitto no Chōsen!" (Japanese: 怪盗アジットの挑戦！)	March 15, 2020 (CAN); March 29, 2020 (US)	May 1, 2020	0.20
The statue is taken to the Los Volmos Museum where everyone learns that the phantom thief plans to steal it tonight. Director Robert reveals that their security is tight, and that they will prevent him from stealing the statue even if he attempts to do so. From afar, Ajit asks Storm to let him handle it by himself because he wants to make up for his failure. Although he is reluctant to allow him to do it alone, when they learn that the AB are volunteering to help guard it as well, he eventually agrees when he comes up with an idea. Ajit approaches the AB and finally introduces himself to them. Although Dan wants to battle him, everyone reminds him that they have a job to do, protecting the statue from the phantom thief. Ajit offers to help them with their guard duty because he’s a phantom thief expert, and that he’s been interested in Storm for a long time. Dan is reluctant at first, however, he makes him promise to have a Bakugan battle with him as soon as they’re done; Ajit eventually agrees. While guarding the statue from the inside of the museum, Ajit tells Pharol that he’ll switch it with a fake one at the right moment, and then claim the real one to begin with. In order to throw off the AB, he decides to give them some security lessons which prove to be fruitless, all according to plan. Later, the power goes out, unaware that Ajit caused this. Just as he’s about to steal the statue, Drago gives everyone some light to see with, nearly getting caught in the process. However, when he gives off more light to make it easier for everyone to see perfectly, he accidentally triggers the sprinkler system. As a result, Robert becomes furious with the AB and Ajit for messing up their facility and kicks them out of the museum. Still, the AB decide to focus on their patrol from outside and keep a close watch on the statue. At one point, they tell Ajit that they do these things for the people because it makes them happy, which is why they have chosen to see this job through to the end, and that’s what really matters, which impresses him a little bit. They ask him if he’ll still help them, but Ajit says that he has to go now because there’s something he has to do. Although he promised to battle Dan, he says he’ll do so next time. However, after getting in the clear, he tells Pharol that their job is already over. While Robert is drying off the statue, it breaks, and he soon discovers that it was a fake from Ajit. He informs the AB of the theft and they set out to find him. Ajit flees with the real statue where it is revealed that he switched them out the moment the sprinkler system was activated. He finds the AB searching for him, and when they find him, they chase after him, unaware of who he truly is. In order to escape from them, Ajit conducts a plan that involves a little game of hide and seek. The AB continue their search, but an unseen presence attacks their Bakugan. Luckily thanks to Trox, Shun alerts them to Pharol’s location, revealed to have camouflaged himself to make it harder for the Bakugan to see him. Ajit tries to force the AB to quit, but they refuse to comply with his demand, still determined to take back the statue that he stole from the museum. Drago manages to locate Pharol still invisible and attacks him, but he repels his ability and attacks him back. Ajit rendezvous with him and flees with the statue still in his hands, having succeeded in his mission after all. The AB start to believe that they failed, but Wynton and Dan reveal that everything is fine now, much to everyone else’s shock. Ajit returns to Storm and gives him the statue, but he breaks it when he deduces to him that he has been fooled. In the meantime, the AB return the actual statue to Robert, but they reveal to him that since they figured that there was a small chance that it would be stolen, they made a copy of it and switched it out with the real one when they arrived, revealing the statue to be a genuine article. Although they apologize for not telling him sooner, he still thanks them for returning it to him. From afar, Ajit soon realizes that the statue he actually stole was a fake, and that they had the same idea as he did, meaning that he fell for it to begin with. Storm tells Ajit that he still has a lot to learn following the fact that he was tricked by the AB. He eventually becomes impressed with him because he showed ambition when he said that he wanted to do this on his own in the first place. In the end, he decides to take him out for something to eat, which he happily accepts as the remnants of the fake statue turn to dust.
111	6a	"The Lady and the Queen"; Transliteration: "Riotto no Joō-sama Ressun!" (Japanese: リオットの女王様レッスン！)	March 22, 2020 (CAN); April 5, 2020 (US) (Note: These episodes were first released on the Cartoon Network app and video-on-demand services on April 3, 2020.)	May 8, 2020	0.26
China Riot discovers a new Bakugan hiding in a tree, whom she plans to use against the AB. While being driven home, she discovers the Rowdy Reds battling each other and decides to test it out against them. Confronting the Rowdy Reds, she challenges them to a battle where she uses her new Bakugan Barbetra. However, she begins to tremble in fear on her first battle, much to her shock. Barbetra wishes to become like Riot who is brave and confident so she won’t be afraid anymore, and Riot advises her to change. She decides to train her using her knowledge of royalty by giving her lessons that will turn her into a real queen bee; Barbetra accepts. Barbetra’s training doesn’t start off that well due to her constant fear, but Riot continues to encourage her to not give up. The next day, Riot challenges Dan to a battle despite being worn out. Dan accepts her challenge. Despite her training, Barbetra is still too scared to battle, but Riot encourages her to remember her lessons and not give up (even though she didn’t have any battle lessons before). Dan gains the upper hand on her, leaving her at near defeat. Seeing Riot injured during the battle because of the lessons she gave her, and being advised by her to not quit, Barbetra gains confidence and uses her lessons to gain the upper hand on Drago. However, he strikes back hard, nearly defeating her in the process, but Barbetra refuses to lose. Suddenly, Riot summons a Baku-gear Core, powers up Barbetra with Baku-gear, and defeats him at last. In the aftermath, Riot and Barbetra celebrate their victory over Dan’s defeat. Dan begins to tease her about the lessons she gave Barbetra, but they soon leave, wanting nothing more to do with him.
112	6b	"The AB's Silver Screen Debut"; Transliteration: "Ōsamu Wan Eiga Debyū!" (Japanese: オーサム・ワン映画デビュー！)	March 22, 2020 (CAN); April 5, 2020 (US)	May 8, 2020	0.26
Dan shows his friends an email that they received about participating in a movie, having already replied to it. They learn that the movie is being filmed in Brakkistan, meaning that Brakken will be taking part in this project. Arriving in Brakkistan, Brakken explains that this is going to be a Bakugan themed movie, which is why he called for the AB because he wants the actors (like the AB) to be Bakugan experts. He says that ever since Bakugan-mania swept the globe worldwide, he believes that if he makes this movie with Bakugan, it will be a big hit, plus Brakkistan will become world famous. The AB start to believe that he’s grown and is starting to take things more seriously now. Brakken reveals that he got this idea from Duran Dane, whom he met when he and his council were coming up with different ideas to make Brakkistan famous. He showed up out of nowhere and offered to make a movie about Bakugan that will make Brakkistan famous. Since then, they have now become best friends. Duran plans to film, direct, write, and star in this movie while Brakken pays for it all. After going through the summary of the movie, Duran shoots the first scene with the AB, but it doesn't go so well since they never acted before. When they shoot the scene again where he advises them to act like their sinister opponents since they battled them before, it actually goes well, so they continue on with the next scenes. In the final scene where there is to be a final battle, Duran and Brakken get into an argument when Brakken refuses to have his statue destroyed, even though Duran says that it’s part of the scene. Their argument then escalates into a Bakugan battle. Determined to stop this madness, the AB intervene and try to restrain them, advising them to calm down, but they refuse to stop. Enraged, Dan defeats them quickly. However, they continue to quarrel with each other. Wynton and Shun state that they should have started filming inside the Drome, that way the statue can be repaired if it were destroyed after the battle, and the battle that just happened now could have been avoided this whole time. The people of Brakkistan start to believe that this movie is a failure after what happened here, but Lia reveals that she shot everything using the 3D camera that she borrowed. The next day, the movie is released in Brakkistan where everyone is actually enjoying it. Back at Studio D, Brakken thanks Lia for making this movie a success, including Duran who actually approved of the AB’s changes to the script, which made it a 3D Bakugan battle experience. This allowed him and Brakken to rekindle their friendship as well, much to the AB’s satisfaction. Although the Bakugan were delighted to have starred in the movie, Dan starts to complain that the AB’s scenes were completely cut out for no reason whatsoever.
113	7a	"Nice to Meet You, Bakugan!"; Transliteration: "Watashi no Uebamu-chan!" (Japanese: 私のウェバムちゃん！)	March 29, 2020 (CAN); April 12, 2020 (US)	May 15, 2020	0.28
The AB plan to meet up at Studio D after school, until Emily arrives and shows them her Bakugan. She explains to them that she’s no longer sick now, but she still misses Magnus since he travels around a lot and hasn’t seen him this much. However, she doesn’t feel lonely anymore because everyone at school is nice to her, as well as having her own Bakugan too. Dan offers to teach Emily how to battle since this will be her first time. However, due to her soft side, she refuses to throw her Bakugan for example, much to the AB’s shock. Emily unleashes her Bakugan anyway, which turns out to be a Webam, whom she’s always with every day. Emily finally explains that the reason she came here was because she wanted to challenge Dan to a battle because it’s for Webam’s sake. She says that she doesn’t know why she’s been under a lot of stress lately, then she suspects that she hasn’t been battling for a long time, and Bakugan are known for getting stressed out if they don’t do so. She has learned that Bakugan battling is a serious business, and Magnus taught her to not rely on others, which is why she wants to battle Dan to begin with. Dan eventually accepts her challenge in order to give her the opportunity to learn for herself on Bakugan battling. However, during the battle, a confused Emily begins to show her soft side, begging for Dan to not be so hard on her Bakugan, but Dan reminds her that this is how battles really go. At one point, Drago inadvertently misses because of the way she was looking at him. Too scared to battle, Emily refuses to go any further because she doesn’t want Webam to get hurt more. This agitates Webam as she begins to attack Drago viciously despite Emily begging for her to stop. Wynton theorizes that since Webam hasn’t been battling for a long time, she is starting to let out that feeling all at once, meaning that she is unleashing her strong desire to battle all at once. Drago struggles in the battle due to being worried about Emily to attack back at Webam, which gives her the upper hand, leaving him at near defeat, upsetting Emily. Determined to put an end to this, Dan powers up Drago with Baku-gear and defeats Webam at last. The next day, Wynton and Lia become concerned about what Dan did to Emily in that battle, believing that it wasn’t nice because it was her first battle after all. They start to believe that she will quit Bakugan battling forever, but Dan assures them that everything will be fine because Webam had the chance to get all of her frustrations out in that battle, despite a lack of proof for starters. Emily soon arrives and challenges Dan to a rematch. She admits that she was scared to battle at first though, but that battle really cheered Webam up to begin with, meaning that she is no longer upset now. Emily begins to realize that Bakugan battling is important to Webam, and asks the AB to teach her more about it. The AB accept. In the end, Emily begins to improve her battling skills in the rematch, which lasts until late at night, tiring out Dan in the process. Nevertheless, she decides to keep on battling just for the fun of it.
114	7b	"Magnus"; Transliteration: "Yami no Niriasu" (Japanese: 闇のニリアス)	March 29, 2020 (CAN); April 12, 2020 (US)	May 15, 2020	0.28
While hanging out with the AB, Emily, who hasn’t seen Magnus in a long time because he travels a lot, tells them that he only replies to one of her messages, most likely telling her that he’s ok. However, she’s still worried about him because she doesn’t know where he goes or what he does during his travels. Meanwhile, Magnus begins to recall everything that has happened in the past few months. Ever since Dusk Industries and AAAnimus teamed up to convince the countries of the world to ban the use of Bakugan for military and commercial purposes, following the Tiko incident, the use of devices have become strictly regulated by law, meaning that older people who were once Brawlers can no longer use Bakugan, including him. The next day, Magnus approaches Matt, whom he befriended yesterday and learns that his Bakugan was stolen. He learns from a news report that a bank robbery involving Bakugan has occurred. Everyone believes that the thieves were using illegal controlling devices (obtained from an unknown source) to control the Bakugan during the heist. The AAAnimus Security Force is already out there looking for them at large. Magnus becomes determined to stop these criminals for good despite his setback. Meanwhile, the criminals do a tradeoff for the controlling devices. Magnus shows up and prepares to battle them using his new device that he created in order to use his Bakugan Nillious. Recognizing him as the Brawler who stops crimes involving Bakugan, the criminals battle him as they gain the upper hand on Nillious. Through his thoughts and beliefs, Magnus refuses to accept the fact that he can’t use a device to control his Bakugan. He states that Bakugan battling is all he knows and all he has left. Nearly at the brink of defeat, Magnus summons a Baku-gear Core, powers up Nillious with Baku-gear, and defeats them at last. In the aftermath, the AAAnimus Security Force arrives and arrests the criminals. Kravitz learns that Magnus hacked into their computer system, yet she still waited until he wrapped them up for her before rushing in. She offers him to join their security force, but Magnus refuses and leaves. Kravitz deduces that Philomena and Benton are allowing him to continue with his activities because it suits their interests. She knows deep down that Magnus has become a vigilante who hunts down criminals that use Bakugan controlling devices. The next morning, Matt’s grandfather gives him his Bakugan back, and it is revealed that Magnus returned it to him along with a message, advising him to keep his Bakugan close.
115	8a	"The Bakugan Battle League"; Transliteration: "Benton no Keikaku" (Japanese: ベントンの計画)	April 5, 2020 (CAN); April 19, 2020 (US)	May 22, 2020	0.27
After defeating the Rowdy Reds, Dan and the AB proclaim to their viewers that they want to battle everyone from around the world. Benton, who has been watching their video, becomes interested in their idea. Later, the AB meet Gordon, Benton’s personal robot assistant who asks for their presence at once. Arriving at Dusk Industries, Benton explains that he has continued his research on Earth, Vestroia, and the Bakugan. After the V-virus was eradicated, the Core Cells have become stable, which has resulted in a change in Vestroia’s ecosystem, which has the power to influence Bakugan. Since the Bakugan can no longer evolve, he knows that Baku-gear has replaced it, which is Vestoria’s new way of assisting Bakugan in difficult battles, which in turn gives a great amount of energy back to Vestroia, thus strengthening the energy cycle in the process. Benton then takes the AB to his latest project, a stadium built specifically for Bakugan using a combination of Dusk Industries and AAAnimus technology. Benton reveals to the AB that he and Philomena have joined forces for this project, but there were a lot of disagreements among them during the design stage. When they ask him about why he would build a Coliseum to begin with, Benton explains that ever since he was possessed by Tiko, he used Bakugan to send the world into chaos. In order to make up for his actions, he wants to hold a tournament here in order to show the world that Bakugan are good from within, and that he wants the AB to help him with his plans. Although the AB want Shun to join them since he’s busy at Kazami Holdings, Benton reveals that he arranged for his arrival after speaking with Toshi, much to their surprise and delight. Beginning their training on the new arena, Benton has their Bakugan undergo all sorts of tests, which don’t go so well to begin with. Benton theorizes that each Bakugan has different abilities not suited for every event. He suggests having a worldwide Bakugan sports competition because he wants people to see the true abilities of the Bakugan, which is why he wanted to test the AB’s Bakugan in the first place. He starts to believe that it might not work because each Bakugan is completely unique in their own way. He seeks to come up with a solution that will be fun for all Bakugan and Brawlers worldwide once he analyzes the data further. While taking their break, the AB decide to battle each other because they didn’t come here just to be shown this arena, and be expected to not do anything at all. In the meantime, Benton continues to examine the data, still determined to create an exciting event that will show the ability of each Bakugan. When he witnesses the AB battling each other, he starts to believe that Bakugan battles are still the best way to highlight their appeals, but he still needs to find a way to make them more entertaining. Suddenly, Gordon accidentally opens up the pool as the Bakugan begin to fall into it. Dan uses it to his advantage and defeats Hydorous to begin with. In the aftermath, Benton congratulates the AB for their amazing battle because they used this opportunity to have fun. He explains to them that he is going to take everything that he just witnessed, and create a new kind of Bakugan battle tournament. With his idea starting to become clear (in which it won’t be a Bakugan sports competition), he proclaims that this event will be known as the Bakugan Battle League, much to their surprise. He asks them to enter this tournament because they will have the opportunity to battle many Brawlers worldwide. The AB soon become excited about this event, knowing that they will get the chance to battle many strong Brawlers from around the world.
116	8b	"The Ancient Elder"; Transliteration: "Kodai Bakugan no Jirētā" (Japanese: 古代爆丸のジレーター)	April 5, 2020 (CAN); April 19, 2020 (US)	May 22, 2020	0.27
The AB and their Bakugan are playing baseball. However, Drago accidentally hits the ball far. When they go to find another one, Drago finds one, but it turns out to be a rock instead. When Dan throws it away, it turns into a Bakugan named Gillator (revealed to be an ancient Bakugan). He starts to become confused on where he is all of a sudden, but Drago offers to explain everything to him. From his explanation, he learns that Vestroia and Earth merged together, making it harder for him to believe. The AB deduce that he has been in a deep hibernation way before the “Great Collision” to begin with. Lia theorizes that Bakugan existed on Earth in ancient times. Although Gillator remembers everything about Vestroia, he’s still not accustomed to Earth. The other Bakugan assure him that his memories will come back soon since he just woke up, but Gillator becomes shocked by their presence and considers them enemies due to their different factions. Drago tells him that Bakugan in different factions weren’t the reason they battled, even on Vestroia, they just battled as friends, much to Gillator's disbelief. Everyone deduces to him that the culture of Bakugan has changed during his hibernation, and that disliking someone from a different faction is wrong. However, Gillator still refuses to accept the changes in this time. He decides to train Drago in his own way, much to his shock. Gillator’s training turns out to be pointless for Drago, but Dan encourages him to go along with it for now. Drago tells him that the AB fight together to overcome a lot of difficulties using the power of friendship, but Gillator is still not convinced, so he advises him to prove the true meaning of friendship with different factions by having a Bakugan battle. He and Drago team up against Trox and Hydorous in order to prove who's right. However, he refuses to allow Dan to guide him, still believing that he can handle this battle himself. Gillator is shown to be a powerful Bakugan overcoming their first attacks and gaining the upper hand on them to begin with. However, they combine their attacks and strike back hard against him. Nearly at the brink of defeat, Dan can’t seem to power up Drago or Gillator because Trox and Hydorous are blocking his path. Just as they are about to finish off Drago, Gillator intervenes and takes the hit, saving Drago in the process. He says that it’s his duty to protect his juniors, like Drago for starters, including the fact that adversity can make anyone stronger, which is known as the true meaning of being a Pyrus Bakugan. Determined to finish this battle and win, Dan powers up Gillator with Baku-gear and defeats Trox and Hydorous alongside Drago at last before Shun and Wynton can have the chance to power them up with Baku-gear as well. In the aftermath, Gillator admits that he was wrong about everything before then. He decides to accept everyone’s diversity and joins the team as the AB welcome him with open arms.
117	9a	"Bakugan Wynton"; Transliteration: "Boku ga Bakugan de Bakugan ga Boku de" (Japanese: 僕が爆丸で爆丸が僕で)	April 12, 2020 (CAN); April 26, 2020 (US)	May 29, 2020	0.24
Benton announces the Bakugan Battle League to the public where Brawlers worldwide will be competing against each other in this international tournament. The AB become excited about it because they will get to battle many Brawlers from around the world. They decide to start training immediately. However, Wynton skips training and decides to go look for a new Bakugan as part of his plan to strengthen the team for the Bakugan Battle League. Using his new invention, Wynton successfully locates an undiscovered Bakugan. When he summons it, the Bakugan introduces himself as Batrix, revealed to be a flying type Bakugan, much to Wynton’s impression. When he tries to get a clear view of him, he accidentally falls off a cliff, but Batrix manages to save him. Much to their shock, they soon learn that they have inadvertently swapped bodies. Wynton deduces that he used some sort of ability that made them swap places, but Batrix says that he does not have an ability like that. Batrix (in Wynton’s body) suggests that they have fun for a while since this will be his first time as a human, much to Wynton’s disagreement. Wynton on the other hand is not used to being a Bakugan, like ever. Batrix continues with his fun shenanigans despite Wynton trying to stop him. Suddenly, they spot Chad and Chester, whom Wynton recognizes from before when he and Lia battled them. Batrix approaches them and challenges them to a battle to which they accept. During the battle, Wynton becomes afraid to battle, and Batrix accidentally powers up Chester’s Bakugan, giving him the upper hand to begin with. Wanting to prove himself out in the field as a Bakugan, Wynton fights back, but is still on the verge of defeat. Batrix suggests retreating, but Wynton refuses to run away. Instead, he allows himself to be attacked multiple times, much to Batrix’s worries. However, Trox reveals to him that he’s trying to get his Baku-gear by pushing himself towards the brink of defeat. Before Batrix can claim the Baku-gear Core, Chester attempts to stop him from doing so. When a bunch of rocks from the attack prepare to crush him, Wynton saves him. Much to their delight, they soon learn that they are back in their own bodies now. With that out of the way, Wynton successfully powers up Batrix with Baku-gear and defeats Chester yet again. Back at Studio D, Wynton tells his friends about everything that happened today, such as swapping bodies with a Bakugan like Batrix for example. He says that it gave him the opportunity to learn more about Bakugan and wished that the others could have seen him battling to begin with.
118	9b	"The Boy From Brazil"; Transliteration: "Burajiru Kara Kita Shōnen" (Japanese: ブラジルから来た少年)	April 12, 2020 (CAN); April 26, 2020 (US)	May 29, 2020	0.24
The AB are on their way to a soccer game in which Shun is a really big soccer fan. Shun theorizes that soccer is a great opportunity by how well a team works together, just like in Bakugan battling. Suddenly, a gust of wind blows Shuns scarf off of him. When he goes to retrieve it, he discovers a Bakugan. When Shun rolls it out, the Bakugan introduces himself as Ramparian who refuses to battle at first because he’s worried about his looks for example. After showing off his moves to the AB, they soon learn that they are about to miss the soccer game, so they head over to it right away. At the game, Shun reveals to his friends that Pepe is the star player from Brazil. The AB eventually become impressed with how he shot that goal for example. However, Lia thinks that he’s not acting like a team player, to which Shun agrees, but he’s still a good player. Ramparian starts to think that if he did soccer too, everyone would pay attention to him. Liking the idea, he attempts to take part in the game despite the AB trying to stop him from doing so. This gets Pepe’s attention since he wasn’t expecting their presence to begin with. After the game, Shun becomes determined to get an autograph from Pepe. When he approaches them, they become shocked when they discover that he knows who they are. Pepe takes the AB back to the stadium and challenges them to a battle since he believes that he doesn’t need teammates to begin with. Shun decides to battle him where he becomes determined to defeat him. During the battle, Ramparian begins to lose focus by showing off a lot, giving Pepe the upper hand with his soccer skills to begin with. Nearly defeated, Ramparian becomes worried that everyone will see him like this, but Shun tells him that as long as he stands up and fights to the very end, he’ll still look good even if he loses. Touched by his words, Ramparian decides to continue the battle and gains the upper hand on Pepe with his new-found confidence. Pepe intercepts Shun’s Baku-core with his soccer skills and nearly defeats Ramparian, but Shun summons a Baku-gear Core, powers up Ramparian with Baku-gear, and defeats Pepe at last after Ramparian reveals that he and Shun will never lose to Brawlers who treat their partners cruelly. In the aftermath, Pepe soon leaves after warning Shun that he will defeat him at some point in the Bakugan Battle League coming up soon. Shun states that strong Brawlers will be coming from all over the world to battle in this tournament at some point. Dan states that he has become more excited for the Bakugan Battle League and becomes determined to face every Brawler he goes up against.
119	10a	"Haunted House"; Transliteration: "Gōsuto Burōrāzu" (Japanese: ゴーストブローラーズ)	April 19, 2020 (CAN); May 3, 2020 (US)	June 5, 2020	0.21
Marco and his friends attempt to make a video, believing that it will become number one on the internet. However, they discover a ghost which scares them. Dan becomes scared as well when he sees the video that everyone was talking about. The AB travel to the house where the ghost has been spotted according to the footage that was shot, determined to find out if it really does exist. While exploring the house, the team discovers the ghost in one of the rooms and flee in terror. After fleeing from a few haunted things for a while, Shun inadvertently bumps into the ghost, revealed to be a shy little girl and her Bakugan who were behind all that scary stuff to begin with. The Bakugan, whose name is Sairus, explains that her partner Monica has been living under her strict parents for a long time, and that they forced her to study all day every day, and that she wasn’t allowed to play outside or socialize with other kids. Under a lot of stress from the experience, they started sneaking out at night and stumbled upon an abandoned house as the perfect place for her to relax a little. This explains why she was scaring them with her tricks because she was too stressed out from studying a lot. Monica apologizes to the AB, saying that she took her tricks too far to begin with, but as they prepare to leave, Lia refuses to go anywhere, still unable to get over the fact that Monica scared them to begin with. She challenges her to a battle: if Monica wins, she’ll forgive her for what she’s done; Monica accepts her challenge. However, she begins to have trouble giving Sairus directions due to her shyness. With some encouragement from Lia to speak up so that her Bakugan can hear her well, Monica overcomes her shyness and strikes back hard against her. Lia finally realizes that the reason Monica pretended to be a ghost was because she was lonely, which is why she scared the AB in the first place in order to get attention from them. Monica explains that she was always stuck inside the house while everyone else played outside, which is why she didn’t have a single friend to begin with because it made her very jealous to see them out there. Lia advises her to stop scaring people and agrees for the AB to be her friend if she does so, which will give her the opportunity to play with them; Monica happily accepts. With everything settled now, they prepare to finish this battle once and for all. However, Lia ends up victorious. In the aftermath, Monica thanks the AB for making her dream come true, which was playing with a friend like Lia for example. She begins to fade away, having fulfilled her dream at last, but before doing so, she asks Lia to take her place as Sairus’s new partner. It is revealed that the house that the AB explored was the one that Monica and her parents have been living in for all these years. Lia eventually becomes satisfied that she and Sairus are going to get along just fine.
120	10b	"Two of a Kind"; Transliteration: "Mitchaku! Raitoningu" (Japanese: 密着！ライトニング)	April 19, 2020 (CAN); May 3, 2020 (US)	June 5, 2020	0.21
Lightning starts digging for his bones that he hid until he stumbles upon a new Bakugan. When he rolls it out, the Bakugan introduces himself as Tretorous. However, he suddenly falls asleep, much to the Bakugan’s shock, and much to Lightning’s delight since he enjoys sleeping a lot too, therefore, he does the same as well. Meanwhile, Dan and Lia are battling where Lia emerges victorious. Suddenly, Veronica arrives asking to shoot a story of Lightning battling with his Bakugan. When they arrive, they find him asleep. The AB notice that Lightning has found a new Bakugan partner to begin with. Veronica becomes anxious to film him battling with his new Bakugan, so Lia wakes him up. When he does so, the AB explain to him that a news story is going to be shot of him, along with his battling skills on his new partner, which will give them the opportunity to learn more about him. Suddenly, Lightning hears barking in the distance and heads toward the source. At one point, Howlkor reminds him of the news story, but he tells him that he’s not feeling it right now, making him believe that he’s starting to sound like Tretorous. Marco confronts Lightning and demands that he leave this dog park this instant because it’s for members only, like his pure-bred dog Duke, but he doesn’t listen and starts messing around in the park, with Duke attempting to chase him out of here. Infuriated, Marco challenges Lightning to a battle, but before he can roll out his Bakugan, Duke snatches it from him and decides to battle him in his place, much to his shock. Lightning eventually accepts his challenge; however, he accidentally rolls out Tretorous. The AB arrive and witness Lightning battling Duke who appears to have the upper hand due to his lessons from Marco. Nearly at the brink of defeat, Lightning encourages Tretorous to not give up so easily. Touched by his words, Tretorous gains the confidence needed to continue the battle, giving Lightning the upper hand. He and Duke then race to the Baku-gear Cores, and Lightning manages to make it over the obstacle. He then powers up Tretorous with Baku-gear and defeats Duke at last, much to the AB’s delight. It is also revealed that the entire battle was filmed by Veronica. In the aftermath, Duke approaches Lightning and becomes impressed with how he won that battle. Lightning hopes that they will battle again soon. Back at Studio D, Dan deduces that many people watched the story about Lightning and Duke battling each other for the very first time. Lia says that her mom was happy about it. Because of that, everyone has been talking about Lightning who has become a hit sensation on the net to begin with. The AB then learn that Lightning will always be as he is every day.
121	11a	"Magnus P.I., Part 1"; Transliteration: "Magunasu no Jiken-bo Zenpen" (Japanese: マグナスの事件簿・前編)	April 26, 2020 (CAN); May 17, 2020 (US) (Note: These episodes were first released on the Cartoon Network app and video-on-demand services on May 8, 2020.)	June 12, 2020	0.20
Magnus learns that a bunch of thefts have been carried out in Middle City by a mysterious thief/thieves. He suspects that a Bakugan was involved in every single one of them. Magnus becomes determined to stop these criminals and their plans for good. Arriving in the city, Magnus begins to search for clues on the thieves whereabouts, discovering that each item of little value was stolen by a Bakugan from different locations to begin with. He is soon confronted by a group of AAAnimus security soldiers who suspect that he might be the thief they’re looking for (even though Magnus was only there to investigate the thefts to begin with). In an attempt to take him in by force, they challenge him to a battle where they seem to have the upper hand due to their intense training, but Magnus strikes back hard against them. However, the battle is soon cut short when Kravitz arrives and tells Magnus that he’s not the thief they’re looking for, having set up a profile on the actual criminal to begin with. She deduces to him that the thief is as clever as Magnus to begin with. Still, Magnus decides to find out how good this thief really is. He continues to search for clues that will help him find the thief, thinking that they always leave something behind at every crime scene, but he can’t seem to find anything yet. Continuing to go over the crime scenes again, believing that he missed something, he suddenly begins to realize that the locations that the thief hit were part of his plan to form some sort of constellation pattern and deduces where he’ll strike next. Later, Magnus confronts the thief, believing him to be Storm; however, it turns out to be Ajit instead, much to his shock. Magnus deduces that he was attempting to create the Phantom Thief’s signature mark by hitting those locations to begin with, and since it’s not complete yet, the tower is its final mark. Ajit decides to take no interest in battling Magnus and attempts to complete the mark, but the latter attempts to stop the former from doing so. Nillious is suddenly attacked by Pharol who uses his cloaking ability to throw him off, making it harder for Magnus to battle. Remembering Kravitz’s words from before, he deduces the opposite and guides Nillious into attacking Pharol still using his cloaking ability, much to Ajit’s shock. Ajit is soon contacted by Storm and calls for a retreat as he rendezvouses with him and flees, but Magnus, still determined to stop him, has Nillious attack Pharol right at the moon, disabling his cloaking ability in the process temporarily. He soon discovers him to be a Golden Bakugan as they continue to fly away, leaving him completely shocked by what he has just seen.
122	11b	"Magnus P.I., Part 2"; Transliteration: "Magunasu no Jiken-bo Kōhen" (Japanese: マグナスの事件簿・後編)	April 26, 2020 (CAN); May 17, 2020 (US)	June 12, 2020	0.20
Ajit becomes disappointed about Magnus thwarting his attempt to complete the mark at the tower. Storm tells him that his plan has come to an end, having become disappointed about his failed attempt to set up the last mark at the tower. Ajit begs for him to give him another chance to finish this, but Storm says that there’s no point in completing the mark, and that it’s his decision to decide whether to stop or not. During dinner, Ajit reminds Storm of how he first found him as a kid when he ran away from the orphanage and decided to take him under his wing. Having become grateful of what he did for him, he becomes determined to complete the mark no matter what, impressing Storm in the process. Meanwhile, Kravitz sets up a security unit around the tower according to Magnus’s intel, hoping to catch the thief for starters. In the meantime, Ajit returns to the tower and sneaks up to the top while continuing to reminisce about his past; even though he had no friends and family for starters, he always looked up to Storm who taught him how to survive, having found a place where he could belong. He starts to believe that if he can finish this heist, it will prove how much he has grown as a thief to start with. After completing the mark and informing Storm about his success, Magnus confronts him again and reveals that he gave the AAAnimus Security Force fake intel so they would loosen up security a bit. Since he saw his Golden Bakugan, he challenges him to a battle yet again. Ajit attempts to escape, not taking any interest in battling Magnus, but he stops him from getting any further. Eventually, he is left with no choice but to battle him. Ajit has Pharol use his cloaking ability again like last time, but Magnus, not wanting to fall for the same trick again, uses his thermal readings and guides Nillious into attacking him multiple times. However, Ajit makes a comeback and strikes back hard against him. Nearly at the brink of defeat, Magnus summons his new Bakugan Eenoch to lay some damage onto Pharol. He then powers up Nillious with Baku-gear and nearly defeats him; however, nearly at the brink of defeat, Ajit summons a Baku-gear Core, powers up Pharol with Baku-gear, and defeats Nillious, leaving Eenoch as the only one standing. Before Magnus can power him up with Baku-gear, they soon hear the Security Force arriving at the scene. He advises Ajit to escape for now because he wants to settle their score at some point later on so that no one will get in their way again, much to his surprise, but before leaving, he returns the stolen item to him, revealed to be a light bulb. Magnus then walks away sarcastically like it was nothing.
123	12a	"Awesome Brawlers Training Camp Part 1"; Transliteration: "Ōsamu Wan no Bakugan Gasshuku" (Japanese: オーサム・ワンの爆丸合宿)	May 3, 2020 (CAN); May 24, 2020 (US)	June 19, 2020	0.22
The AB head to a training camp organized by the Kazami’s to train for the Bakugan Battle League coming up soon. They are about to have some fun, but they soon discover the ranking predictions online where they don’t seem satisfied with their predicted rank (with the exception of Lightning who is ranked in first place). Nevertheless, the AB decide to begin their hardcore training so that they can be prepared for the Bakugan Battle League. Lia suggests that they train separately since they’ll be facing each other in this tournament at some point. Arriving at their training grounds, the AB begin their hardcore training. However, Drago begins to doubt their decision to train separately and suggests to Dan that they train as a group, but Dan disagrees, saying that this is the only way to perfect their abilities while also believing that this is all about winning the Bakugan Battle League. Later, Drago gathers the other Bakugan as they discuss the matter beforehand since they don’t agree with their partners' decision to train separately from each other, believing that there will be no fun at all if it continues like this. Determined to get the AB back together no matter what, the Bakugan bring them together and challenge them to a card game; if the Bakugan win, they will have to hear out their request; if the AB win, they will agree to train for the Bakugan Battle League in their own way. Eventually, the team decides to accept their challenge. However, the Bakugan emerge victorious, but the AB declare a rematch against them. They continue to play the card game many times until the AB emerge victorious. However, they still agree to listen to the Bakugan’s request. They begin to explain that the best way to prepare for the Bakugan Battle League is to train together. Drago starts to believe that the AB would be better off together, rather than separated because they’ll get to have fun together no matter what. Eventually, they agree to train together because it’s way more fun than training separately. The next day, the AB begin their training, this time together, knowing that this is the best way to go. Suddenly, Ajit approaches them from out of nowhere, leaving them completely surprised.
124	12b	"Awesome Brawlers Training Camp Part 2"; Transliteration: "Ajitto no Himitsu" (Japanese: アジットの秘密)	May 3, 2020 (CAN); May 24, 2020 (US)	June 19, 2020	0.22
Picking up where we left off, Ajit asks the AB if he can join in on their practice training for starters, much to their surprise. The last time they’ve seen him was during the break-in at the museum which was orchestrated by Storm; luckily, they managed to keep the statue safe to begin with. Dan asks Ajit about how he made a Golden Bakugan like Pharol his partner to begin with, but he says that he doesn’t know. Ajit begins to hang out and train with the AB, and everyone seems to be happy. Later, Lia informs everyone that the deadline to enter the Bakugan Battle League is today. This leaves the AB excited about meeting the new Brawlers to begin with. Ajit says that he’s not entering it because he prefers battling with them despite being encouraged to do so. Desperate for him to enter, Dan signs him up for the league anyway, but he soon leaves all of a sudden. The AB eventually become concerned about Ajit’s reason for keeping a lot of secrets about himself from them, which is also the same reason that he’s not able to focus on Bakugan. On the last day of their training camp, Ajit suggests that he battle the entire Awesome Brawlers team by himself because he wants to go all out. He manages to defeat everyone, leaving Dan as his last opponent. Eventually, Ajit allows him to use all of his Bakugan at once in order to make this more of a challenge for him. Nearly defeated, Ajit discovers his new Bakugan fully awakened, calls back Pharol, and summons him into battle where he introduces himself as Auxillataur, much to everyone else’s shock. Ajit reveals to them that since he’s been asleep for a long time, the energy from the battles woke him up all of a sudden. Auxillataur gains the upper hand and defeats everyone but Drago. When he attempts to strike back hard against him, Auxillataur counters his attack and defeats him at last. This leaves Dan utterly impressed by Ajit’s talents to begin with. Ajit thanks the AB for giving him a great battle, having become satisfied by this experience and leaves once again after wishing them good luck in the tournament despite Dan insisting that they keep on training for the Bakugan Battle League, hoping that he’ll be there. In the end, Dan and the others decide to continue their training so that they’ll be ready for the Bakugan Battle League once and for all.
125	13a	"The Bakugan Battle League Begins"; Transliteration: "Kaimaku! Gēmu!!" (Japanese: 開幕！爆ゲーム！！)	May 10, 2020 (CAN); May 31, 2020 (US)	June 26, 2020	0.14
The AB are about to compete in the Bakugan Battle League. When they arrive at the arena, they discover many Brawlers from around the world ready to compete in this international tournament to start with. During the ceremony, Mr. B, the new announcer for the Bakugan Battle League, announces the first round known as the qualifying round, taking place all over Los Volmos; only the top 16 Brawlers will advance to the next round. He also announces that when the semi-finals come up, the battles will be moved to the Bakugan Coliseum. The winner of the Bakugan Battle League will receive the championship trophy, along with the title “World’s Best Brawler.” The qualifying round begins as many of the Brawlers go all out in their respective matches. Dan prepares to battle Trey once again, planning to go all out in this one. Trey on the other hand has a secret plan to win this battle once and for all. During the match, Dan is left at a disadvantage due to a lot of food that he ate recently (especially that ice cream sundae to begin with). With the rest of the AB advancing to the next round, Dan prepares to finish this, but Trey already knows about his plan to use Baku-gear as his last resort. He explains his plan to him where he intends to use the data from their last battle to pull off his attack plan by having Drago’s power level dropped to a point where he won’t be able to access his Baku-gear, that way, he can use his finishing move to win this battle once and for all. Nearly at the brink of defeat due to the pain he’s feeling right now, Dan discovers to his surprise that Ajit has entered the tournament and becomes determined to win this battle for good, in which he successfully reduces Trey’s attack. He then powers up Drago with Baku-gear and defeats him yet again, advancing to the next round in the process. In the aftermath, Trey apologizes to his brother about his loss, but Aay reassures him that he did his best after all. With the 16 Brawlers confirmed, they all advance to the next round.
126	13b	"Riot vs. Ajit"; Transliteration: "Fukushū no Riotto" (Japanese: 復讐のリオット)	May 10, 2020 (CAN); May 31, 2020 (US)	June 26, 2020	0.14
With the qualifying round over, the matches for the next round are set for the top 16 Brawlers who are willing to make it to the quarter-finals. The AB discover that China Riot and Ajit are competing in the first match. Riot becomes determined to defeat Ajit for good since he interrupted her match against Dan in the previous tournament, which made her very angry to begin with. Meanwhile, Ajit begins to doubt his decision about competing in the Bakugan Battle League (even though Dan already signed him up for it to begin with). He tells Pharol that he sensed an intense emotion when Dan and the others battled, and that he wants to know what it feels like for starters. The first match is about to begin with Riot competing against Ajit. Mr. B introduces a new gimmick where each match will decide how many Bakugan a Brawler can use. As the battle commences, Riot becomes desperate to defeat Ajit as payback for interrupting her match against Dan in the previous tournament. Believing that the battle will be over too quickly because of how strong he really is, Ajit calls back Auxillataur and decides to use Pharol instead in order to give her a fighting chance. Still, due to Riot’s hatred towards him, she gains the upper hand on Ajit, dealing a lot of damage to Pharol in the process while inadvertently attacking Barbetra as well (even though Barbetra doesn’t mind being attacked while holding tightly onto Pharol), much to Ajit’s shock as she’s willing to go this far to begin with. However, despite her best efforts in this battle, Ajit successfully defeats Maxotaur, leaving Barbetra as the only one standing. Nearly at the brink of defeat, Riot powers up Barbetra with Baku-gear and attempts to finish off Pharol. However, Ajit makes a comeback by turning Barbetra’s Baku-gear ability against her, defeating her in the process, and advancing to the quarter-finals. In the aftermath, Ajit attempts to make amends with Riot, but she rebuffs him. Instead, she urges him to win this Battle League once and for all. Elsewhere, Storm observes Ajit, hoping that he’ll make it to the finals because he seeks to obtain the championship trophy.
127	14a	"Kung Fu Master"; Transliteration: "Bakugan Kanfū" (Japanese: 爆丸カンフー)	May 17, 2020 (CAN); June 7, 2020 (US)	July 3, 2020	0.21
Following the victories of Pepe and the Revenger, the 4th and 5th matches are about to commence, with Dan competing against Zhao, and Lia competing against Bobby. Dan starts to believe that if he can win his battle fast, he’ll have enough time to go cheer for Lia, much to her annoyance. She starts to believe that her battle will not take longer than his to begin with because she’ll be facing Bobby, much to Dan’s surprise. Bobby meets up with the AB, informing them that he’s going to win this battle for good, having come a long way to begin with. They also meet Dan’s opponent Zhao who came all the way from China to compete in this tournament. He begins to show admiration towards him, having watched the AB’s videos, signifying that he’s famous worldwide. Dan and Lia begin their matches against their opponents, with the former hoping to finish his first before the latter even starts. However, Zhao uses his kung fu skills and gains the upper hand on him, prompting Dan to do the same as well, but he ends up humiliating himself in front of the crowd. Zhao becomes disappointed in Dan because he can’t even pay attention to this battle to begin with. Realizing his actions from the beginning of the battle, Dan apologizes to his Bakugan as they advise him to not get distracted and battle like they always do. Zhao nearly defeats him, but Dan summons 2 Baku-gear Cores, powers up Drago and Gillator with Baku-gear, and defeats him at last, advancing to the quarter-finals in the process. Even though he lost, Zhao and Dan make amends for their amazing battle. Much to his surprise, Dan finds Lia cheering for him. In the aftermath, Lia tells Dan that she finished her battle before he did, which gave her enough time to go cheer him on. She reveals that during her battle, she was shocked by the size difference in Bobby’s Bakugan at first, but they still managed to defeat him. On the other hand, Wynton shows the AB an uploaded video about Dan’s kung fu failure, which is already trending worldwide, humiliating him even further.
128	14b	"A Battle of Popularity"; Transliteration: "Ninki-sha wa Dotchida!?" (Japanese: 人気者はどっちだ！？)	May 17, 2020 (CAN); June 7, 2020 (US)	July 3, 2020	0.21
Dan and Lia host a contest where they advise everyone worldwide to cheer for either Shun or Wynton in their respective matches. During their battles, on Dan and Lia’s urging, Wynton and Shun begin to grow competitive about winning this contest by inadvertently putting on a show for starters. However, this results in both of them losing a Bakugan all of a sudden. Realizing that the contest distracted them from their battles, Wynton and Shun regain their focus and successfully defeat their opponents, advancing to the quarter-finals in the process. In the aftermath, Dan and Lia reveal to Shun and Wynton that Lightning won the contest. Howlkor explains to them that all they did was have a normal Bakugan battle, without putting on a show for starters, making everyone realize that the fans just wanted to see a normal battle to begin with. With the first round over, the top 8 Brawlers (consisting of Ajit, Pepe, Revenger, Dan, Lia, Wynton, Shun, and Lightning) advance to the quarter-finals.
129	15a	"The Mysterious Revenger"; Transliteration: "Nazo no Ribenjā" (Japanese: 謎のリベンジャー)	May 24, 2020 (CAN); June 14, 2020 (US)	July 10, 2020	0.25
With the quarter-finals already underway, the battles are moved to the Bakugan Coliseum where Dan and Revenger are competing in the first match. The AB soon encounter Chad and Chester again where they introduce them to Revenger, Dan’s upcoming opponent who intends to defeat him in this match using his rock and roll style of battling. At the Bakugan Coliseum where the simulations of different battlefields are shown, the first match is about to begin with Dan vs Revenger. Since they can only use 1 Bakugan, Dan chooses one randomly and ends up choosing Gillator. During the battle, Dan begins to have trouble adjusting to this battlefield. Revenger on the other hand gains the upper hand on them, causing Dan and Gillator to take cover while attempting to figure out a strategy to win this battle once and for all. Unbeknownst to them, they are unaware that Chad and Chester are guiding him to begin with. This leads the AB to believe that he’s cheating for starters. Still trying to figure out a strategy for a counterattack, Gillator climbs up an ice glacier, exposing himself out in the open, all according to plan. When Revenger attacks, Gillator makes a comeback where it is revealed that he wanted to expose himself on purpose in order to find his opponent. He memorized his attack pattern so that he could dodge with perfect timing. This gives Dan the chance to attack all at once, but he disappears yet again. Chad and Chester continue to guide Revenger, but they are soon caught by the AB, leaving him at a disadvantage now. Dan confronts Revenger as he reveals himself as Kurin. He begins to explain that a few months ago, he felt lost, until he found Chad and Chester and decided to join them in the art of rock and roll. When Dan appeared, he got angry and jealous when everyone began to focus on him a lot, which is why he entered the Bakugan Battle League in the first place to get back at him for all the attention he got instead of him. Determined to finish this battle once and for all, Dan successfully defeats Kurin, advancing to the semi-finals in the process. The AB later inform him that Revenger, aka Kurin cheated, but he didn’t even know about it before then, yet he still won that battle anyway. In the meantime, Ajit begins to struggle in his battle against Pepe. When he spots Storm in the crowd, he becomes determined to win this battle, and claim the trophy when the time is right, which is why he chose to compete in the Bakugan Battle League in the first place. He succeeds in defeating Pepe and advances to the semi-finals. From afar, Storm deduces that the trophy is being kept in a secure location and plans to steal it once it’s brought out during the final battle. In the aftermath, Ajit meets up with the AB as they congratulate him for his victory, having figured he would make it this far to begin with. Dan hopes that they’ll make it to the finals so that they can face each other head on. Ajit hopes for the same thing as well, but in reality, his actual plan is to steal the trophy, rather than win it.
130	15b	"Wynton Vs. Lia"; Transliteration: "Uinton VS Ria" (Japanese: ウィントンVSリア)	May 24, 2020 (CAN); June 14, 2020 (US)	July 10, 2020	0.25
The next match is about to begin with Wynton competing against Lia. No one really knows how this battle is going to go since they already know each other's moves. Shun on the other hand is excited about competing against Lightning, advising him to be prepared when they battle. Before the matches begin, Lia makes everyone promise to not show any hard feelings no matter who wins. The next match commences as Lia and Wynton battle hard against each other since they know each other’s moves, and they’ve decided to remain cautious for now. In the climax of the battle, instead of going for the Baku-gear Cores, believing that using them too soon would be too easy, Wynton and Lia use their normal attacks to even up the score instead, leaving both of them at near defeat. They then power up their Bakugan with Baku-gear at the same time and end up defeating each other, resulting in a tie. When Benton and Mr. B go over the replay, it is revealed that Pegatrix reverted to her ball form much quicker than Trox did, making Wynton the true winner of this match, which means he has advanced to the semi-finals. Lia congratulates him for his victory, still keeping her promise. In the aftermath, Wynton tells Lia that if he hadn’t distracted her, she would have won that battle to begin with. Lia on the other hand admits that the reason she lost was because she got distracted during the climax of the battle, but they still decide to make amends. In the next match, Shun is about to face Lightning, but he doesn’t show up all of a sudden. That's when they realize that he inadvertently fell asleep as his Bakugan attempt to wake him up. As a result, Shun wins by default and advances to the semi-finals.
131	16a	"The Best Friend"; Transliteration: "Shinyū Dōshi no Tatakai" (Japanese: 親友同士の戦い)	May 31, 2020 (CAN); June 28, 2020 (US) (Note: These episodes were first released on the Cartoon Network app and video-on-demand services on June 12, 2020.)	July 17, 2020	0.14
Dan and Wynton are about to compete against each other in the semi-finals. Even though they are friends, they become determined to win this match at any cost. During the battle, Wynton and Dan use their own battle styles against each other, resulting in 2 of their Bakugan being defeated at the same time. Wynton begins criticizing Dan for his recklessness in his battle style because it reminds him of how much trouble it has caused them ever since they were little. This results in an argument between them as they start quarreling with each other about the early history of their friendship. Nearing the climax of the battle, the battlefield suddenly turns into a Volcano Alley (even though it’s just a simulation so that the Brawlers don’t get hurt). This gives Dan the upper hand because deep down, he knows that being reckless isn’t so bad after all, making Wynton finally understand that this is where he gets his strength from. He reminisces about the time when he and Dan got lost in the forest as kids, and Dan reassured him that they would get home safely no matter what. Inspired by his strength, Wynton becomes determined to defeat him no matter what. Dan responds by recalling the moment they first met when he became impressed with all the amazing things he has made beforehand. Because of how happy he really is for getting the chance to battle him, Wynton becomes surprised by this experience, prompting them to continue the battle. With both of them at the brink of defeat, Wynton takes a reckless action by jumping over the ravine, reaches the Baku-gear Core, powers up Trox with Baku-gear, and is about to defeat Drago. However, Dan has Drago charge towards the attack as he reverts to his small form and back again in order to dodge it. Following that, he powers him up with Baku-gear and defeats him at last. Eventually, Wynton becomes impressed with Dan’s strategy that he just pulled off, and as a result, Dan is declared the winner of this match and advances to the finals. In the aftermath, Wynton and Dan make amends as the former advises the latter to win the finals. Dan reassures him that he’ll become the World's Best Brawler as promised.
132	16b	"Thief and Brawler"; Transliteration: "Kaitō to Burōrā" (Japanese: 怪盗とブローラー)	May 31, 2020 (CAN); June 28, 2020 (US)	July 17, 2020	0.14
The second match of the semi-finals is about to commence between Shun and Ajit, but he doesn’t show up all of a sudden. Meanwhile, Ajit begins to question Storm about stealing the championship trophy, believing that it wouldn’t be right to do so, making the latter believe that he’s planning on giving up thievery. Left with no other choice, Storm threatens to expose a video of his thefts to everyone, including the AB if he doesn’t do what he says. Eventually, Ajit manages to show up just in the nick of time, but Shun realizes that something is wrong with him. The battle commences as Shun gains the upper hand on Ajit at first, but he strikes back hard and nearly defeats Ramparian. Shun powers him up with Baku-gear and defeats Pharol, much to the AB’s shock. He and Ajit then summon their final Bakugan (consisting of Hydorous and Auxillataur) since Ramparian’s B power is too low to continue the battle. Unbeknownst to Shun, Storm contacts Ajit and reveals that he put a memory card containing the video inside the trophy, meaning that it will be revealed to everyone if anyone else gets their hands on it. More than that, he found out that he was wavering between his desires to be a phantom thief or a Brawler and decided to use the Bakugan Battle League to make him a true phantom thief for starters. Shun prepares to finish off Ajit, but much to the latter’s shock, he discovers that he missed on purpose because he knows that something is bothering him. Shun advises Ajit to focus on the battle, saying that it wouldn’t be a true fight if he defeated him now. He tells him that despite his troubled thoughts, Bakugan battling is more important to him than anything else, advising him to battle for himself. On Auxillataur’s encouragement, and touched by Shun’s words, Ajit, not really caring if Storm releases the video, becomes determined to win this battle for himself. Continuing with the battle, Ajit uses the water from the battlefield to his advantage and pulls off a powerful attack on Hydorous despite sustaining heavy damage. Regardless, he successfully defeats Shun and advances to the finals. In the aftermath, Shun congratulates Ajit for his victory, and Ajit thanks Shun for helping him regain his focus. Since he’s moving on to the finals, he becomes determined to defeat Dan once and for all, only this time, he seeks to claim the trophy not as a phantom thief, but as a true champion, finally understanding the true meaning of being a Brawler. From afar, Storm discovers that Ajit has made his choice to become a Brawler and decides to take matters into his own hands.
133	17a	"Final Battle! Dan Vs. Ajit"; Transliteration: "Kesshō! Dan VS Ajitto" (Japanese: 決勝！ダンVSアジット)	June 7, 2020 (CAN); July 5, 2020 (US)	July 24, 2020	0.17
The final battle is about to begin between Dan and Ajit. Ajit becomes concerned about what the outcome will be since Storm planted a memory chip inside the trophy that will expose him as the phantom thief if anyone else claims it. Dan becomes determined to defeat Ajit, and he also asks him to tell him about his Golden Bakugan and himself if he wins; Ajit awkwardly agrees. Since this is the final battle, not only can the 2 Brawlers summon their second Bakugan whenever they need to, but the battlefield will most likely transform randomly at random times. The battle begins where Dan seems to have the upper hand on Ajit due to his fast combo attacks. Before he can finish this, the battlefield suddenly changes to the water field, leaving him at a disadvantage now. Ajit makes a comeback and successfully defeats Gillator. Nearly at the brink of defeat, Ajit powers up Pharol with Baku-gear and attempts to finish off Drago, but he counters his attack and successfully defeats him, much to the AB’s surprise. With only Auxillataur remaining, Ajit gains the upper hand as he is willing to go all out in order to win this battle for good. Drago is nearly defeated, but the battlefield changes yet again to the rocky mountain field, saving him in the process. Seeing that Ajit is going all out on this one, and still determined to win this battle for good, Dan strategizes a plan where he has Drago push Auxillataur into the volcano just as it erupts. He then powers him up with Baku-gear and successfully defeats him, thus winning the championship of the Bakugan Battle League. Despite losing, Ajit still congratulates him as Dan celebrates his newfound victory.
134	17b	"Secrets Exposed"; Transliteration: "Abaka Reta Himitsu" (Japanese: 暴かれた秘密)	June 7, 2020 (CAN); July 5, 2020(US)	July 24, 2020	0.17
Dan is about to be crowned the champion of the Bakugan Battle League as Benton prepares to give him the championship trophy. Ajit becomes worried that the video will be exposed if he claims it due to the flash drive that’s still inside of it. Suddenly, everyone’s Bakugan, including the AB’s goes missing. Storm appears and reveals that he has taken everyone’s Bakugan. While everyone is distracted, Ajit attempts to search for the flash drive on the trophy, but it is no longer there. He suddenly realizes that Storm used the Bakugan Battle League as part of a ruse to steal everyone’s Bakugan, which was his main goal all along. He then flees with the captured Bakugan. Ajit pursues him, joined by Dan who offers to help him track down Storm. They travel to his hideout located in the warehouse district by the port, much to Dan’s suspicion. To change the subject, Ajit offers to tell Dan how he and Pharol met for the first time; he once visited some ancient ruins hidden by a thick jungle in a faraway country. He then entered a mysterious place, revealed to be the maze. That’s when he stumbled upon a couple of strange looking balls, revealed to be Bakugan since he didn’t know about them before then. Following the mysterious light that covered the entire Earth, following the aftermath of Tiko’s defeat, Pharol awakened. Since then, they have become like family to each other. Dan and Ajit arrive at the warehouse and confront Storm who is holding the Bakugan captive in a device that not only captures them, but also rolls them out as well, which also gives him the ability to battle too. He first pit’s the AB’s primary Bakugan against them because they are strong, not to mention that Drago and Pharol are still worn out from fighting in the championship battle. However, Dan and Ajit refuse to back down and successfully defeat them, leading Storm to pit the rest of the Bakugan against them. Ajit goes after him while Dan holds off the remaining Bakugan. Confronting him, Ajit reprimands Storm for stealing everyone’s Bakugan, which was his main goal all along, having misled him into thinking that the trophy was their real goal to begin with. Storm tells Ajit that all he wanted was for him to be a phantom thief, having raised him for years as his “ultimate masterpiece.” He reveals that all the work he did for him was part of a test to show where his true loyalty lies. He urges Ajit to choose his path, either with the phantom thief, or with the Bakugan (in reality, it’s either Storm, or the AB). Thinking it through, Ajit tells Storm that although he still loves him, he refuses to allow him to get away with stealing everyone’s Bakugan, angering him in the process. Dan successfully defeats all of the Bakugan and attempts to capture Storm, but he creates a smoke screen and gives Ajit one more chance to choose wisely, begging for him to come back. Realizing his actions from the very beginning, Ajit refuses to return to him. Storm, feeling betrayed, angrily leaves. Back at the Coliseum, Dan and Ajit are hailed as heroes as they return everyone’s Bakugan to their rightful partners. From afar, Storm releases the video and exposes Ajit as the phantom thief, much to everyone’s shock. The AB suddenly realize that he was responsible for the thefts all around town, but unbeknownst to them, he suddenly disappears without a trace.
135	18a	"Here Comes Haavik"; Transliteration: "Uchū Ichi no Otazunemono Hāvuikku" (Japanese: 宇宙一のおたずね者ハーヴィック)	June 21, 2020 (CAN); July 26, 2020 (US)	July 31, 2020	0.18
A meteor crash lands into Los Volmos where it shapeshifts into a humanoid being named Haavik who seeks to cause mayhem and destruction everywhere. Suddenly, a group of robot mechanoids arrive and attempt to destroy him, but he escapes and uses his shapeshifting abilities to cause destruction everywhere in the city to start with. Meanwhile, Dan feels sad about what happened recently ever since he found out that Ajit was a phantom thief all along, making the AB wonder why he would turn to a life of crime to begin with. It was a secret that he has been struggling with for a long time. Suddenly, the AB are visited by Trey and Chad who challenge Dan to a battle, following his victory in the Bakugan Battle League. Eventually, Dan reluctantly accepts their challenge, but he ends up defeating them easily because his time in the Bakugan Battle League made him stronger. Trey and Chad challenge him to a rematch, but before they can do so, the robot mechanoids arrive, still trying to destroy Haavik, causing them to flee in terror. They start attacking Drago for no reason, but Dan decides to battle them anyway. Nearly defeated, he powers up Drago with Baku-gear and destroys them easily. From afar, Haavik spots Drago as one of the Bakugan from Vestroia, leaving him clueless as to what he’s doing here on Earth. In the aftermath, the AB are left clueless as to where those robots came from. Dan deduces that they were after someone named Haavik, leaving them clueless on what just happened here. Elsewhere, Haavik obtains a data storage drive from a heavily damaged mechanoid and discovers that Earth and Vestroia have fused together. Fascinated by this discovery, he plans to cause destruction to both worlds as part of his “entertainment” to begin with.
136	18b	"The Fusion Bakugan Arrive"; Transliteration: "Kurosu Bakugan" (Japanese: クロス爆丸)	June 21, 2020 (CAN); July 26, 2020 (US)	July 31, 2020	0.18
Trey and Chad quarrel over their loss to Dan and end up blaming each other for the outcome. Suddenly, Haavik approaches them and brainwashes them after he offers to turn their Bakugan skills into something great. They give him their Bakugan as he comes up with an idea that will give them the chance to get back at Dan for their humiliating defeat since Earth and Vestroia fused together. Meanwhile, the AB are doing an interview with Dan and Drago, following their victory in the Bakugan Battle League, which is suddenly interrupted by the arrival of Chad and Trey who challenge Dan to a rematch yet again. They summon their Bakugan and fuse them together, forming Fangzor x Aquos, much to the AB’s shock as Haavik watches from afar, hoping they’ll succeed in defeating Dan this time. The duo gain the upper hand on him with their fusion Bakugan due to its incredible power. The AB deduce that since that Bakugan has the power of two factions fused together, it's now twice as strong as before, meaning that their special powers have been amplified as well. Dan powers up Drago with Baku-gear, but the Fusion Bakugan counters the attack and knocks it away, leaving them at near defeat. With Drago about to be defeated, Dan summons Gillator and Cyndeous to assist him. They nearly defeat them, but Trey and Chad power up their Fusion Bakugan with Fusion Baku-gear, giving them the upper hand. From afar, Dan’s powerful attack hits a tree and seemingly crushes Haavik who witnessed it, freeing Chad and Trey from his brainwashing in the process, leaving them utterly confused at the moment. This gives Dan the chance to finish them off successfully. Haavik becomes upset that Dan won the battle and becomes determined to get back at him by putting on a show that he soon won’t forget. In the aftermath, Dan asks Chad and Trey about Haavik, but since they’re free from his brainwashing, they claim no memory of him. Elsewhere, Haavik walks away with the Fusion Bakugan that he stole from them as he prepares for his next act.
137	19a	"The Director"; Transliteration: "Ria, Kantoku Debyū!?" (Japanese: リア、監督デビュー！？)	July 5, 2020 (CAN); July 19, 2020 (US)	August 7, 2020	0.16
Everett Ray, who's now a famous movie producer asks Lia to direct his next movie that stars Bakugan in it, having seen the last one from Brakkistan, having figured that she was the one who directed it to begin with. Lia is reluctant to accept his offer, but when he takes her to the movie set and shows her around, she eventually agrees. Lia tells her friends about the offer she accepted from Everett about directing a movie, much to their concern due to their last encounter with him, but she reassures them that she’ll still maintain her friendship with them once she’s famous. Lia begins directing the movie, which goes pretty well for starters, much to Everett’s happiness. However, just as Lia is about to rest up for the night, she eavesdrops on a conversation between Everett and the investors who do not approve of his movie because they prefer it to be a disastrous one, rather than a touching one. Everett reveals that he made revisions to the second half of the script, meaning that it’s no longer a touching film involving Bakugan in it, but rather a disaster movie, which makes the Bakugan the antagonists as a result. He also reveals that they’ll be using real Bakugan to give the scenes plenty of impact and explains how the movie will end, which involves the humans prevailing over the Bakugan. Enraged by the sudden changes to the movie, Lia confronts Everett and starts to oppose his idea of the Bakugan being seen as the antagonists. She refuses to continue with this movie and prepares to leave, but Everett warns her that if she quits now, she’ll not only lose her chance at being a director, but she’ll be labeled as a big failure. Lia is left hesitating over what to do since she doesn’t want to make a movie that involves Bakugan being cast in a bad light, but she’s also worried about quitting as a director because if she does so, they’ll replace her and continue filming. Suddenly, a plan of hers comes into motion. The next day at the movie set, Lia pretends to agree with Everetts changes to the movie, all according to plan. Everett suggests that they battle for real as part of the disaster scene. As the battle begins, Lia tricks him into causing massive damage to the movie set while taunting him countlessly, which was her plan all along. Although she is defeated, the set and video footage end up destroyed, which means that this movie is completely scrapped. In the aftermath, Everett reveals to Lia that he was just doing what the investors wanted him to do. Lia tells him that all he ever thinks about is himself, saying that there’s more to life than just being a star and making money. After she leaves, Everett continues to mourn the loss of his career, leaving him in sudden debt. Suddenly, Haavik, disguised as an investor, approaches him, reveals himself to him, brainwashes him, and captures him, intending to use him for his own sinister purpose.
138	19b	"Queen Ebony"; Transliteration: "Kuīn Ebonī" (Japanese: クィーン・エボニー)	July 5, 2020 (CAN); July 19, 2020 (US)	August 7, 2020	0.16
A group of stray dogs chase after a street cat named Ebony after stealing a fish from them. After being cornered, Boss, the leader of the stray pack, tells her that she must become strong in order to survive. Later, Ebony wishes that she could run away from this place since she has nowhere else to go and doesn’t have the strength to stand up to those dogs. Suddenly, she discovers a Bakugan, much to her surprise. Meanwhile, Lightning discovers that a bunch of stray dogs have been raiding many stores for some odd reason. When he approaches a dog trembling in fear, he begins to explain that the Queen is forcing them to steal from humans. It is revealed that the Queen is Ebony who has taken control of the dogs so that they’ll do her bidding, or else. Lightning discovers her, and the dog tells him that no one can oppose her since she beat the boss. A flashback reveals that Ebony returned to confront the dogs and summoned her Bakugan Ryerazu to intimidate them, and to show them just how strong she really is. Since then, she has risen to power because of her Bakugan, leaving the other dogs with no choice but to serve her. Determined to put an end to her tyranny, Lightning locates Boss, revealed to be an old friend of his. Boss explains that things have changed on the streets ever since Ebony rose to power because of her Bakugan. He also mentions that Lightning used to run with the pack; he never lost a single fight against the other rival packs, in which he was nicknamed “Demonic Lightning,” much to the Bakugan's disbelief. Lightning opposes the idea of using a Bakugan to control everyone like Ebony’s for example and becomes determined to stop her. Meanwhile, Ebony prepares to send the dogs to raid a jewelry store, but she is soon confronted by Lightning who reprimands her for endangering these dogs by controlling them for starters, as well as lecturing her about what strength should be used for, which is helping others, not making them suffer. Since Ebony has suffered for a very long time, she challenges Lightning to a battle; if he wins, she’ll have to leave this town for good, but if Ebony wins, he’ll have to become one of her servants and help raid the jewelry store. During the battle, Ebony reveals that after she met Ryerazu, everything changed for her as she started gaining strength, which also gave her freedom. Lightning opposes her idea of freedom being earned by bullying others, which she brushes off easily. Nearly at the brink of defeat, Lightning powers up Howlkor with Baku-gear and defeats her at last. In the aftermath, Ebony leaves to pursue her freedom elsewhere, as well as her followers who have chosen to remain loyal to her. Lightning begins to have this strange feeling that they’ll meet again soon.
139	20a	"Sophie, the Bakuganist"; Transliteration: "Bakugan o Mamoru On'na Sofī" (Japanese: 爆丸を守る女・ソフィー)	July 12, 2020 (CAN); August 2, 2020 (US)	August 14, 2020	0.18
Sophie Judson-Warfield, a Bakuganist who comes from a rich family, and is the leader of the “Citizens to Save Bakugan Society” attempts to put an end to all Bakugan battles by influencing people to put their Bakugan into her care, believing that every Brawler out there is forcing Bakugan to battle. Meanwhile during a live broadcast focused on Dan and Wynton’s battle, Wynton prepares to use his special move that he just came up with, which is suddenly interrupted by Sophie and the Society. She attempts to force the AB to stop broadcasting battle videos, believing that they cause harm to Bakugan. The AB try to explain that they’re not really forcing their Bakugan to battle each other, saying that they need to battle in order to stay happy and healthy, but Sophie doesn’t believe them. She thinks that their Bakugan are just being brainwashed by them. The AB deduce that Sophie is a Bakuganist, people who believe that Bakugan should be cared for, but never allowed to battle. In order to get her to leave them alone, the AB pretend to be interested in her ideas, satisfying her in the process, who in turn asks them to make a video about it. Later, Sophie discovers to her deception that the AB have posted another battle video, meaning that they deceived her. Enraged, Sophie returns to the arena the next day and confronts the AB for lying to her, having realized their plan after discovering their new battle video. She starts opposing their videos, believing that they're a bad influence to kids around the world and threatens to confiscate their Bakugan. The Society gives her a controlling device as Sophie challenges Wynton to a battle due to her belief that he’s the biggest liar of them all. Eventually, Wynton is left with no choice but to battle her. During the battle, Sophie reveals that despite opposing Bakugan battles, she’s just borrowing the power of a Bakugan in order to save them, much to the AB’s shock. Wynton tries to get her to listen to what the Bakugan have to say, but she refuses and continues attacking Trox. Wynton gains the upper hand and nearly defeats her, but Sophie summons a Baku-gear Core, having tricked him into pushing her towards the brink of defeat, powers up Centipod with Baku-gear, and nearly defeats Trox. However, Trox disables Centipod’s Baku-gear before advising Wynton to use his “Project Miracle Hyper-Illusion E.X.” move that turns Centipod’s attack against him, defeating Sophie in the process. Saddened by her loss, Wynton tries to explain that he didn’t force Trox to battle or anything, yet Sophie still refuses to believe him. Late at night, Sophie is still despondent over losing her battle against Wynton, still holding on to her belief that battles are still cruel for all Bakugan everywhere. Suddenly, Haavik, disguised as one of her supporters, appears once again, reveals himself to her, and brainwashes her, intending to use her for his own purpose.
140	20b	"Midnight Train Battle!"; Transliteration: "Ressha de no Shitō" (Japanese: 列車での死闘)	July 12, 2020 (CAN); August 2, 2020 (US)	August 14, 2020	0.18
Magnus arrives at a trainyard, still determined to put an end to the number of crimes committed with illegal controlling devices since they have been growing rapidly for so long. He was unable to slow them down to begin with and starts to believe that the only way to prevent this root cause is to stop the device supply at its source. He successfully locates the perpetrators as he overhears a conversation between a local arms dealer and a hooded figure (revealed to be Col. Tripp) who has been put in charge of guarding the precious cargo (which contains the controlling devices). He gives him a controlling device and decides to leave the rest to him. Magnus suspects that he might be the one behind all of this and becomes determined to stop him at any cost. The train departs as Magnus climbs into one of the train cars. There, he discovers a stash of controlling devices, unaware that his presence has caught the attention of Tripp. Magnus heads toward the locomotive and prepares to release the three train cars from it, thinking that it will stop the crime rate from climbing any higher, but Tripp stops him all of a sudden. Tripp begins to explain that after he was kicked out of the military, he spent days bouncing from job to job, until he found one that gave him a device again so that he could brawl just like the old days. Magnus responds by saying that he intends to stop all crime, which is the only thing he cares about. A battle ensues where Magnus becomes determined to win so that Tripp will tell him everything that he needs to know. Tripp pretends to surrender and offers to tell Magnus about the man who hired him, but in reality, he causes him to lower his guard, gaining the upper hand all of a sudden, making him realize that he was just stalling for time. As the train makes a slight turn, Magnus clings over the edge as Tripp defeats Eenoch. He manages to climb back up as a Baku-gear Core appears in front of him which he uses to power up Nillious. He barely defeats Tripp, but this wasn’t his actual plan from the start. Instead, he had Nillious uncouple the train cars, which was his main goal all along. Nillious then pushes the cars off the bridge, destroying the devices in the process. Following that, despite failing to get anything out of Tripp, Magnus, who has a device in his hands, decides to track down the location of where it came from, which will also lead him to the man behind this operation for starters.
141	21a	"Dangerous Dealings"; Transliteration: "Yami Shōnen Makyū" (Japanese: 闇商人・マキュー)	July 19, 2020 (CAN); August 9, 2020 (US) (Note: These episodes were first released on the Cartoon Network app and video-on-demand services on July 17, 2020.)	August 21, 2020	0.19
The AB learn about the recent crimes that have been committed with illegal controlling devices. Knowing that the criminals are using them to force Bakugan to commit crimes all over Los Volmos, they become determined to stop them at any cost, which includes their ringleader. While trying to figure out where to find him, Shun explains that Kazami International Holdings has been investigating these devices, having collected info on the person in charge of this operation to start with. Since they don’t have any proof of his involvement, the only way to capture him is to catch him in possession of a device so that they can arrest him. Wynton suggests luring the arms dealer to them by pretending to buy a device from him, to which Shun agrees. According to their plan, the AB intend to catch him in the act with an illegal controlling device, that way, they’ll have enough proof and be able to stop him for good. Lia asks Shun if they can get someone from the company to do it, but Shun reveals that if they discuss it with Toshi and the others, they’ll say it’s too dangerous and prevent them from executing their plan, meaning that the criminals will keep selling illegal devices. Despite the danger, Shun plans to use his Bakugan for backup if things get out of hand. He also reveals that he contacted him by pretending to be a dealer from a black-market in another city, and that he agreed to meet with him after he offered to pay him double his asking price (unaware that the gold is fake). Suspicious that he might see through Shun’s disguise, the AB decide to make him look like a grown-up black-market dealer in order to pull this off. At the meet up spot, the AB wait for the arms dealer to arrive, planning to catch him once he brings out the devices. The arms dealer, whose name is McQ, arrives and meets up with Shun. Shun prepares to give him his payment in exchange for the devices (all according to plan), but McQ, who is suspicious, takes his Bakugan from him just in case. Unbeknownst to them, Dan discovers Magnus at their location and tells him their plan to catch McQ who is responsible for selling illegal controlling devices, then he suddenly realizes that Magnus is also here for that same purpose as well. After showing Shun his collection of devices, McQ reveals his backstory to him. He used to be a device retailer where he made a lot of money, and even saved enough to start his own business. Before he could sell his newly developed model, Kazami International Holdings introduced a higher-quality device. Because of that, his devices couldn’t sell, and as a result, his company was put out of business, which is why he holds a grudge against the Kazami’s in the first place. He then brings out Shun’s friends who have been captured by his goons and deduces his identity, having figured out his plan from the start. Suddenly, Magnus shows up and battles McQ. Dan discovers that he’s using a device and reprimands him for using one since they’re illegal now. He also learns that McQ found out about Magnus who has been hunting down and catching criminals for a long time. Magnus responds by saying that he is just bringing down thugs, and that he intends to do the same to him as well. Determined to finish this, Magnus nearly defeats McQ, but he powers up Cycloid with Baku-gear and is about to finish off Nillious, but Drago intervenes and takes the hit instead, much to Magnus’s shock. Nevertheless, he successfully defeats McQ. McQ orders his goons to escape with the devices, but Ramparian appears and smashes the car, destroying them in the process. Shun reveals that he kept a Bakugan hidden from him as a backup plan just in case their original plan failed. He also reveals that he contacted the AAAnimus Security Force. McQ tries to escape, but Drago stops him, and as a result, McQ and his goons are arrested. The AB soon discover that Magnus has disappeared, but Dan says that he’s just doing his job as he continues his pursuit of more criminals using illegal controlling devices. While transporting McQ to prison, Haavik, disguised as an AAAnimus security soldier, reveals himself to him, and brainwashes him, intending to use him for his own purpose.
142	21b	"The Hunter Returns"; Transliteration: "Kaettekita Hantā" (Japanese: 帰ってきたハンター)	July 19, 2020 (CAN); August 9, 2020 (US)	August 21, 2020	0.19
Lightning becomes bored because Dan and the others are still at school, meaning he has nothing to do at the moment. Suddenly, Strata appears, captures him, and imprisons him at his hideout. Strata begins to explain that he is aware of the increasing restrictions on Bakugan, meaning that he can no longer capture them and sell them like he used to. Instead, he decided to become an animal hunter where he has collected a bunch of them due to their rare talents. He plans to sell them to as many collectors as possible, including Lighting in order to become rich. After he leaves, Lightning tries to reach for the keys in order to escape, but fails. He soon discovers that Ebony has been captured as well since Strata took her Bakugan from her in the process. Despite their differences, including their last encounter, Ebony asks Lightning to help her escape from this place, to which he agrees. During their attempt, Lightning suggests that they ask the other animals to help as well, but Ebony remains skeptical, saying that they might betray them in order to save themselves. While searching for Lightning, Howlkor, Artulean, and Pheadrus soon encounter the other stray animals who are also looking for him and Ebony. When Strata returns preparing to sell Ebony to a buyer he found, the animals retaliate and knock him out. They then escape his hideout, but they are stopped by a fence which Lightning is unable to climb. Ebony, who has recovered her Bakugan, escapes and decides to leave him and the other animals behind to deal with Strata, saying that she only cares about saving herself. Suddenly, Strata appears and knocks her out while also defeating Ryerazu. He then proceeds to attack the other animals. Luckily, Lightning's Bakugan and the other stray animals arrive to rescue him. Lightning summons Howlkor and battles Strata, but he gains the upper hand and nearly defeats him. Luckily, Ebony, having had a change of heart, intervenes, giving Lightning the chance to finish him off. Following that, the animals imprison him in a cage as revenge for imprisoning them in the first place. In the aftermath, Ebony reveals that she intends to use her power to make a future for herself, to which Lightning doesn’t mind the outcome. He then returns home with his Bakugan.
143	22a	"Farewell, Phantom Thief, Part 1"; Transliteration: "Sayonara Kaitō Zenpen" (Japanese: さよなら怪盗・前編)	July 26, 2020 (CAN); August 16, 2020 (US)	August 28, 2020	0.20
Dan is still feeling despondent about Ajit’s secret being exposed to everyone, including him. Determined to find him, he and Drago return to Storm’s hideout which is now abandoned. While hiding, they witness Ajit activating a secret switch leading to a hidden basement. Dan follows him down there, and Ajit discovers them and tells them that this is Storm’s real hideout. Dan asks for answers on why he would choose to be a phantom thief to begin with, and although Ajit admits it, he refuses to say anything more and walks away, saying that he has something important to do. When Dan attempts to get answers from Ajit in the ensuing scuffle, he accidentally sets off Storm’s security system. Luckily, Ajit manages to save himself and Dan. Since Storm knows they’re here now, Ajit has no choice but to allow Dan to accompany him as they evade all of his traps. Ajit reveals his origins to Dan, how Storm took him in when he was little, and gave him everything he could ever dream of. Since then, he has considered him a father figure to him. Although Dan is still mad at him for keeping the truth from the AB (including him), he begins to consider Ajit as his friend for starters. When they arrive at the room, which is the reason Ajit is here in the first place, Dan discovers Storm’s collection full of Bakugan artifacts that he has been stealing for a long time, and Ajit explains that he’s here to take all of it. Thinking that he’s going to steal from Storm as payback for exposing him as a phantom thief to everyone in the first place, Dan refuses to allow him to do so and pushes him out of the room. This leads to an ensuing Bakugan battle. When Ajit asks Dan why he cares so much about him, Dan explains that they should be friends. He says that if he continues his thievery, they’ll never be able to have the chance to battle each other again. Dan reminds him of their final battle during the Bakugan Battle League, how it was so much fun for starters, which is why he wants to battle like that again someday. Feeling the same way as well, Ajit ends their battle, prompting Dan to do the same as well. Suddenly, Ajit activates a switch that brings Dan back up to the surface, saying that he must do this no matter what, much to Dan’s shock. When Storm returns to his hideout, he discovers that all of his artifacts have been stolen and deduces that Ajit was responsible for this. Suddenly, Haavik appears, offers him a Bakugan in order to take revenge on Ajit for stealing from him, and brainwashes him, intending to use him for that single purpose to start with.
144	22b	"Farewell, Phantom Thief, Part 2"; Transliteration: "Sayonara Kaitō Kōhen" (Japanese: さよなら怪盗・後編)	July 26, 2020 (CAN); August 16, 2020 (US)	August 28, 2020	0.20
The AB find out that Dan was tricked by Ajit. He begins to believe that he’s still a phantom thief, having chosen stealing over Bakugan brawling. Shun thinks that Ajit had a logical reason to steal Storm’s collection to begin with, aside from his passion for Bakugan battling. Suddenly, the AB discover that all of the artifacts that were stolen recently have been returned to their rightful owners, the same ones from Storm’s hideout. They suddenly realize that Ajit was responsible for their safe return. Realizing that he was wrong about him, Dan decides to go find him. Meanwhile, Ajit successfully returns the last of the artifacts to the museum. Just as he’s about to leave, he is soon confronted by Storm who is not pleased with him for returning all of the artifacts that he stole from him. Ajit tells him that he plans on giving up thievery for good. Feeling betrayed by his decision, Storm initiates a Bakugan battle using his new Bakugan Cimoga. During the battle, Storm gains the upper hand on him as he causes minimal damage to the museum, causing Ajit to set up the Drome for starters. Storm reveals that he plans to destroy him for his betrayal. With Ajit at the brink of defeat, Storm prepares to finish him off, but the AB arrive just in time to save him. They begin to explain that they’ve been investigating all of the stolen artifacts that Dan could remember seeing. During that time, they went around asking the rightful owners if their things had been returned, then they found out that this museum was the only one with a piece still missing. The AB prepare to battle Storm, but Ajit persuades them to let him handle this battle alone. He gains the upper hand and nearly defeats him. Storm attempts to stop him from using a Baku-gear Core, only to be intercepted by Ajit since he taught him all sorts of tricks that can be used in many different ways. He then powers up Pharol with Baku-gear and successfully defeats him. Following that, Storm disappears after warning Ajit that he will destroy him and anyone else who works against him. From afar, Haavik is upset that Storm lost the battle and becomes frustrated that the AB always interfere with everything. As a result, he decides to face them in person at some point in order to experience his own way of having fun. In the aftermath, Ajit decides to turn himself in to the AAAnimus Security Force because he wishes to live a normal life just like the AB. While being driven away, the AB catch up to him and advise him to come back someday, saying that they’ll be waiting for him as long as it takes. Dan makes a promise to battle him when he gets back at some point, and Ajit, feeling emotional, agrees. As a result, he tells them to wait for him when the time comes.
145	23a	"The Awesome Brawlers and Haavik"; Transliteration: "Hāvuikku no Chōsen-jō Zenpen" (Japanese: ハーヴィックの挑戦状・前編)	August 2, 2020 (CAN); August 23, 2020 (US)	September 4, 2020	0.15
The AB begin to wonder what’s going to happen to Ajit, following the fact that he returned all of the stolen artifacts to their rightful owners. Shun thinks that they’re going to investigate his situation, including Storm’s involvement. Dan reassures them that he’ll be fine, saying that he made a promise to come back and have an epic battle with him when the time comes. In the meantime, Drago suggests having a battle, to which Dan and the rest of the AB (with the exception of Lightning) agree since they don’t want to be cooped up in Studio D all day. Before they can battle, they meet Haavik, the greatest entertainer in the universe who offers them an invitation full of challenges in which they could win a special prize if they win (his main focus is on Dan who sees a lot of talent in him). He also warns them that they won’t be able to quit halfway once they start. Interested in these challenges, Dan decides to accept them. During the challenges, Dan fails 2 of them, which results in Wynton and Lia being put to sleep by Haavik. Knowing that he’s been cheating this whole time, and no longer caring about the prize, Dan prepares to quit, but Haavik warns him that if he does, his friends will be trapped in an endless slumber forever. Determined to save his friends, Dan decides to continue with the challenges.
146	23b	"First Fusion! Drago and Tretorous"; Transliteration: "Hāvuikku no Chōsen-jō Kōhen" (Japanese: ハーヴィックの挑戦状・後編)	August 2, 2020 (CAN); August 23, 2020 (US)	September 4, 2020	0.15
Continuing with Haavik’s challenges, Dan fails another one, resulting in Shun being put to sleep by him. Having had enough of this, Dan decides to challenge him to a Bakugan battle which he accepts. During the battle, Haavik, who is using Chad and Trey’s fusion Bakugan gains the upper hand on all of Dan’s Bakugan. Nearly at the brink of defeat, Dan calls for Lightning who rushes over to assist him. Despite their combined teamwork, Howlkor and Cyndeous end up defeated in the process by Haavik’s fusion Baku-gear, leaving Drago and Tretorous as the only two Bakugan left standing. Still, Dan and Lightning refuse to give up on this battle, and they inadvertently summon a Fusion Baku-core. As a result, they use it to fuse Drago and Tretorous together, forming Drago x Darkus. Using their Fusion Bakugan, they successfully defeat Haavik, much to his amusement. Haavik, who is impressed with Dan’s skills, decides to make him the ultimate star of his show at some point, planning to use him for his sole purpose of causing mayhem and destruction. In the aftermath, Dan discovers that Haavik has disappeared, but his friends, who have recovered from their slumber have now been released, much to his delight. However, he is soon left clueless about Haavik, and who he really is.
147	24a	"The Puppet Awesome Brawlers"; Transliteration: "Okashina Osamuwan" (Japanese: おかしなオーサム・ワン)	August 9, 2020 (CAN); August 30, 2020 (US)	September 11, 2020	0.14
Dan and Lightning attempt to fuse their Bakugan like they did before when they battled Haavik, but they are unsuccessful. Shun suspects that a special element is required to fuse Bakugan together. Wynton deduces that the only way to fuse Bakugan together is to summon that special Baku-core, otherwise known as a Fusion Core. Dan suggests that they go see Benton who might have some ideas about fusion Bakugan, and the AB also plan on telling him about Haavik. Arriving at Dusk Industries, Benton reveals to the AB that the next Bakugan Battle League is taking place in Tokyo, which is being sponsored by Kazami International Holdings. Since they're in the final planning stages, he asks for their opinions that will make this tournament even more exciting. While coming up with different ideas, the AB begin to quarrel with each other about whose idea is better. Haavik, who has eavesdropped on their quarreling, becomes impressed with their ill will and decides to use it as part of his “entertainment.” He puts the AB and Benton under his control and manipulates them into doing silly things. When Lia falls, Dan, who managed to break free from his control, saves her, then he becomes confused on what is really going on here. Haavik approaches Dan and discovers that he somehow broke free from his trance due to his inner good. He then flies away before returning everything to normal. In the aftermath, the AB suddenly realize that they were under Haaviks control all along, having made them do silly things to begin with. Benton, who is curious about Haavik and what he is capable of with his powers, decides to do some research on him. The AB also advise him to do research on Fusion Bakugan, which he agrees to do, advising them to find something on their end as well. Haavik finds out about the Bakugan Battle League that the AB mentioned beforehand and decides to use this event as part of his “fun” to begin with.
148	24b	"The Return of Sophie"; Transliteration: "Nerawareta Kazami" (Japanese: 狙われたカザミ)	August 9, 2020 (CAN); August 30, 2020 (US)	September 11, 2020	0.14
Sophie becomes despondent because she wasn’t able to save more Bakugan ever since she got involved with the AB. She suspects that Kazami International Holdings is interfering with her Bakugan rescue attempts and decides to come up with a plan to get them out of the way once and for all. Meanwhile after a tag team battle, the AB discover that something is bothering Shun. He explains to them that Sophie is protesting down at Kazami’s Los Volmos Office by spreading false rumors about the company using Bakugan to commit crimes and stuff. They soon watch a video from Sophie’s channel and discover Toshi using a device and rolling out a Bakugan for starters. Shun is suddenly called to the office and heads there as fast as possible. The AB attempt to find evidence to prove that the video is fake, but they are unsuccessful. As a last resort, Wynton calls Benton to investigate this situation. Meanwhile, Shun discovers the device and Bakugan from inside Toshi’s desk, but Toshi claims no memory of making that video or owning a device. He is informed that an expert is analyzing the video in an attempt to find out if it’s fake or not. Nevertheless, Shun believes in Toshi’s innocence. Nearing the analysis of the video, Shun is informed that the video may be real since there wasn’t any tampering to begin with. They soon discover a protest outside of the office claiming that Sophie was right about the Kazami's activities. She starts spreading false rumors to the crowd in an attempt to manipulate them into thinking that the Kazami’s are a danger to Bakugan despite Shun trying to explain that the company and the Battle League haven’t done anything wrong. Suddenly, the AB arrive as Wynton begins to theorize that the video is indeed a fake. He explains that the video used holographic technology just like in the Bakugan Coliseum. Since the last Bakugan Battle League created hyper-realistic battlefields, he deduces that the same tech was used for that video to begin with. Benton confirms Wynton's theory, proving that the video was a fake all along. This makes the crowd turn on Sophie for her false evidence against the Kazami’s. Enraged, Sophie initiates a Bakugan battle and plans on taking down the company once and for all. Determined to protect Kazami International Holdings from her, Shun battles Sophie, but she gains the upper hand on him by using her new device to summon Baku-gear without the need to be pushed towards the brink of defeat. Nearly defeated, Wynton joins in, much to Shun’s delight, and a Fusion Core appears in front of them which they use to fuse Hydorous and Batrix together, forming Hydorous x Ventus. Using their Fusion Bakugan, they successfully defeat Sophie. In the aftermath, Shun says that he found a suspicious person in the video, but he wasn’t able to identify him. He suspects that he might have been the one who put that device in Toshi’s desk. Dan becomes suspicious that Sophie couldn't have done all this herself, especially making that video in the first place. Wynton deduces that they must have hacked the server in Benton’s office in order to steal that technology in the first place, making him think that Sophie has friends who might have helped her in her plan to begin with. Elsewhere, it is revealed that Everett Ray created that fake video in the first place in an attempt to frame the Kazami’s. Haavik, who was impressed with Sophie’s negative actions, decides to pick his next associate (consisting of Everett, McQ, and Storm) to entertain him for his next show, thinking that it will be better than the last one.
149	25a	"Wynton's Reality Show"; Transliteration: "Wynton wa Uchūbito!" (Japanese: ウィントンは宇宙人！)	August 16, 2020 (CAN); September 13, 2020 (US)	September 18, 2020	0.11
Lia discovers that Wynton made a small edit to her video to make it funny and becomes furious at him for embarrassing her like that. As a result, she explodes in anger and tries to attack him while the rest of the AB try to restrain her, but he manages to escape. When he arrives home, his parents call him for a family meeting. They reveal a secret that they’ve been keeping from him for a long time, saying that they’re extraterrestrials from another planet, much to his shock. Wynton thinks this is all a joke at first, but his family reveal that they are indeed extraterrestrials when they expose their alien identities to him. They plan to unlock his powers by having him undergo all sorts of crazy trials to begin with. Meanwhile, Lia, having had second thoughts on her edited video, goes over to Wynton’s house to make amends with him, but she notices a TV crew nearby. While investigating, she is confronted by Everett Ray who reveals that he’s producing a TV show called “The Reality Show.” He explains that the whole point of this show is to pull pranks on people, which are then broadcast all over the world, which is why he chose Wynton in the first place, much to Lia’s suspicion. Meanwhile, Wynton’s family makes him do a final trial in order to unlock his abilities, in which he must battle a “space monster” without using his Bakugan. When the monster appears, it is revealed to be Maxodon, Everett’s Bakugan, causing Wynton to flee as he chases him, much to Everett’s amusement. The director and Wynton’s parents confront him and order him to stop with this video, but he refuses, still planning on giving it some more action. Wynton continues to flee from Maxodon, but Lia manages to save him and explains the whole situation to him, revealing that everything he endured from his family was all part of a TV prank show, meaning that the alien story for example is false, much to Wynton’s shock. Everett confronts the two, still planning on using them to make a very special video that will humiliate them for a long time. Determined to stop him from showing that video to everyone, Wynton prepares to battle him, but Everett uses the same ability that Sophie used to summon Baku-gear at will, giving him the upper hand. Nearly defeated, Lia admits to Wynton that his edit to her video was actually pretty funny. She reassures him that they won’t lose this battle if they work together, boosting Wynton’s confidence in the process, and as a result, they summon a Fusion Core which they use to fuse Trox and Sairus together, forming Trox x Haos. Using their Fusion Bakugan, Wynton and Lia gain the upper hand and successfully defeat Everett. As a result, he ends up fired from making more reality shows since he went too far on this one to begin with. In the aftermath, Wynton apologizes to Lia for making fun of her by editing her video, but she tells him she’s over it now. Having made amends with each other, Wynton suggests making a video based on Everetts reality show, which Lia agrees to do.
150	25b	"Bakugan Soccer"; Transliteration: "Bakugan Sakkā" (Japanese: 爆丸サッカー)	August 16, 2020 (CAN); September 13, 2020 (US)	September 18, 2020	0.11
Lia discovers Pegatrix watching a soccer game. Thinking that she might be interested in the sport, she gathers the AB and tells them that she plans on making a video of Bakugan playing soccer. Lia reveals that she told Benton about it, and because he was fascinated by the idea, he built a ball just for them. Gillator is revealed to be a natural at this game, and he reveals that they had contests similar to soccer back on Vestroia ages ago, but it faded away because it never caught on. Lia shows everyone the video that has been posted, which is now in their top three and plans on doing another match. The next day, Lia reveals that their video caught the attention of some guys who want to challenge them to a game. The team manager, (unaware that it’s Everett) introduces them to his team (which includes Pepe), whom he recruited for their skills at hand. While the AB devise a strategy to win this game, Lia argues against the lineup because she wants Pegatrix in there as well since she’s the reason they’re here in the first place, demanding that they switch Gillator out with her. However, Pegatrix decides to sit this one out, still thinking that Gillator is a better player than her. The game begins where the two teams are tied at first, but the manager substitutes Maxodon onto the field, gaining the advantage in the process. Dan accuses him of causing a handball violation, but he attempts to deny it at first. Lia says that they caught it all on video to prove it, but the manager gains control of the camera and reveals himself as Everett Ray who plans on broadcasting their defeat as payback for his previous loss. The AB soon discover that Gillator has suffered an injury and is unable to continue. As a last resort, he advises Pegatrix to take his place. Pegatrix is unsure about taking his place on the field, still believing that she’s not as good as him and will just get in the way, but Gillator encourages her to have fun no matter what, saying that the most important thing in soccer is to love the sport itself. Touched by his words and encouraged by Lia, Pegatrix decides to go through with the game, and in doing so, she successfully scores a goal, taking the lead in the process. Enraged, Everett attacks Pegatrix. Dan and Lia summon a Fusion Core which they use to fuse Pegatrix and Gillator together, forming Pegatrix x Pyrus. Everett attempts to get the other teammates to help, but they refuse, especially Pepe, saying that they only came here to play soccer, not to battle, and as a result, they abandon him. Because of that, Lia and Dan successfully defeat him once again, causing Everett to leave in frustration. In the aftermath, when Lia asks Pegatrix how her first soccer match was, Pegatrix says she now loves the game, and that she really enjoyed playing it.
151	26a	"Shun and Lightning"; Transliteration: "Shun no Onegai" (Japanese: シュンのお願い)	August 23, 2020 (CAN); September 20, 2020 (US) (Note: These episodes were first released on the Cartoon Network app and video-on-demand services on August 21, 2020.)	September 25, 2020	0.14
The AB become excited about the upcoming Bakugan Battle League taking place in Tokyo, Japan and become determined to do their best in it. Meanwhile, Shun also becomes excited about this event as well since Kazami International Holdings is sponsoring it. However, Toshi reveals to him that there has been a sudden increase of clients that have been ordering tech materials and prefab modules, deducing that they are actually phony corporations. He also deduces that the materials have ended up at a single facility, believing that their systems are being hacked by an unknown source. They become determined to investigate further and find out who is behind all this for starters. In the meantime, Shun and Lightning arrive at a Tumpee sale where Shun is determined to get a special rare keychain that is being sold at this shop for one day if a person has a dog with them despite Lightning’s impatience. After getting the keychain, Lightning asks Shun to go buy him a treat. While doing so, he discovers McQ there with a dog, thought to have been arrested for selling illegal controlling devices and decides to follow him. At first, he finds out that he was just borrowing the dog just to get the keychain, but he continues to follow him, thinking that he will lead him back to his hideout despite Hydorous trying to talk him out of it, thinking that it’s too dangerous to attempt alone. However, midway, McQ eventually finds out that he’s being followed and calls Shun out of his hiding spot. He then initiates a Bakugan battle with Shun, still seeking revenge on him for thwarting his operation for starters. During the battle, McQ powers up Cycloid with Baku-gear using the same device that Sophie and Everett used recently and gains the upper hand on Shun. Shun summons Fade Ninja and Ramparian to assist him, but despite their best efforts, he quickly defeats them. Nearly defeated, Lightning shows up just in time. However, he becomes angry at Shun for making him wait so long for his treats. Nevertheless, Lightning and Shun become determined to defeat McQ no matter the cost, and as a result, they summon a Fusion Core which they use to fuse Howlkor and Ramparian together, forming Howlkor x Aquos. Using their Fusion Bakugan, they successfully defeat McQ. Suddenly, Everett shows up and defeats Hydorous, leaving Shun and Lightning at a standstill.
152	26b	"Premonition of A Storm"; Transliteration: "Arashi no Yokan" (Japanese: 嵐の予感)	August 23, 2020 (CAN); September 20, 2020 (US)	September 25, 2020	0.14
Shun and Lightning get captured by McQ and Everett, as well as having their Bakugan taken away by them. They soon confront them where McQ plans to use Shun in the bestest way possible. Shun attempts to get answers from McQ, deducing that they’re in a factory of some sort, yet he still doesn’t know what they’re making in there, much to his and Everett’s shock. Meanwhile, the AB, who are worried about Shun and Lightning’s absence, contact Toshi who informs them that Shun left early this morning to buy a keychain with Lightning. Since they can’t track him from his phone because it's turned off (meaning that they can’t locate it with GPS), Toshi reveals to them that there’s been some suspicious activity around the company. The AB travel to the location that Toshi told them about, indicating that Shun and Lightning are being held in a suspicious building of some sort. Much to their shock, they discover the aftermath of a Bakugan battle. When they find his keychain, the AB deduce that something happened to him, meaning that Shun and Lightning are somewhere up ahead. Meanwhile, Shun deduces that McQ was behind the phony corporations all along, having sent the materials to this factory. Because he didn’t know anything from the start, Shun reveals to him that he just confirmed it all. McQ suddenly realizes that Shun tricked him and prepares to attack him, but unbeknownst to him, Drago and Batrix manage to free Shun and Lightning as they escape the factory. Shun makes it out safely, but McQ and Everett block his way and try to stop him from getting any further. Luckily, the AB manage to save him. Lightning, who took a detour during their escape, successfully retrieves his and Shun’s Bakugan. Suddenly, the AB inadvertently summon all five Fusion Cores which they use to fuse all of their Bakugan together, leaving McQ and Everett currently outmatched. Suddenly, Storm and Sophie, as well as Haavik arrive to assist them, making the AB realize that they’re all working together for some reason. They gain the upper hand on them at first despite Dan trying to persuade them that they’re all being controlled by Haavik, but they proclaim that they're in control of themselves, and that they’re not being controlled by Haavik, having chosen to assist him. Nevertheless, the AB make a comeback, still determined to defeat him and his “friends.” However, Haavik blows up the factory and disappears with Everett, Storm, McQ, and Sophie. Back at Studio D, the AB discuss the aftermath. Shun says that his company couldn’t figure out what that factory was making in the first place since Haavik blew it up to destroy all traces of evidence, which is what his group wanted all along. He also says that during the explosion, he saw some drones carrying something away, meaning that they’re planning something big. Nevertheless, Dan reassures the AB that they will defeat Haavik, no matter the cost.
153	27a	"Superstar Dan"; Transliteration: "Ōsamu wan, Nihon e iku" (Japanese: オーサム・ワン、日本へ行く)	August 30, 2020 (CAN); September 27, 2020 (US)	October 2, 2020	0.16
The AB travel to Tokyo, Japan to compete in the second Bakugan Battle League. Since they’re arriving early before the event, they become excited about seeing the sites today, especially Dan. After being greeted by Masato and Keiko, Benton tells Dan that he has to do a promotional tour for the tournament here in Tokyo since he’s the champion of the first Bakugan Battle League. Masato reveals that Bakugan are popular in Japan, and because Dan is the reigning champion of the previous Bakugan Battle League, he’s famous in this country, which is why they need his help to do publicity stunts for this event. Encouraged by Benton and Masato, Dan agrees to do the promotional tour while Masato leaves Keiko in charge of him, much to his friend’s shock. During the promotional tour, Dan goes through various publicity stunts, such as interviews and crazy variety shows, but overtime, he starts to get upset in the process because it’s too much for him to handle, and that he would rather hang out with his friends and battle Brawlers who wish to challenge him. However, during another TV show event, which is a Bakugan obstacle course, Dan prepares to back out on this one since he didn’t have enough time to go eat in the first place, nor hang out with his friends, but Keiko offers him a feast of his favorite foods if he goes through with this course. Eventually, Dan agrees and manages to win the competition alongside Drago. When the AB return from their sightseeing, they discover Dan and Drago completely fatigued, having gone through a lot of publicity stunts throughout the entire day.
154	27b	"Awesome Brawlers on Vacation"; Transliteration: "Tōkyō Chin Dōchū!" (Japanese: TOKYO珍道中！)	August 30, 2020 (CAN); September 27, 2020 (US)	October 2, 2020	0.16
Dan tells his friends about everything that happened to him from yesterday, following the publicity stunts that he endured throughout the entire day. His friends reply that they’ve gone through a lot of things as well during their sightseeing. They begin to recall everything that happened yesterday when they first spent the entire day sightseeing all of Tokyo. Suddenly, rogue Bakugan appear and start attacking Edo Village. The AB battle them, but they are too strong. As a last resort, they summon their Fusion Bakugan and defeat them easily, but their Baku balls disappear without a trace. Back in the present, Dan is surprised by what his friends have gone through with the rogue Bakugan, and that they were unable to figure out why they went crazy in the first place. There was no Brawler controlling them, and that they were unable to find them as well since they disappeared without a trace. Elsewhere, it is revealed that McQ was responsible for the Bakugan rampage, having collected the data needed for Haavik’s plan. Haavik becomes determined to use the Bakugan Battle League as part of his “show.” Not only that, he has also captured Duran Dane for starters.
155	28a	"Bakugan Battle League, Tokyo Edition"; Transliteration: "Kaimaku! Gēmu Tōkyō Raundo" (Japanese: 開幕！爆ゲーム・TOKYOラウンド)	September 6, 2020 (CAN); October 4, 2020 (US)	October 9, 2020	0.15
The AB are about to compete in the second Bakugan Battle League which is being held on Battle Island. In this tournament, the new format is a Battle Royal, divided into three stages. The last Brawler standing wins a trophy just like in the last Bakugan Battle League. As the first stage is about to begin, the AB are surprised when they learn that Ajit is also competing in the tournament as well. He begins to explain that he just started his trial period for his new life, such as doing volunteer work, and going to school. He also reveals that Benton arranged for him to participate in this Bakugan Battle League, meaning that the AB will have the chance to battle with him again. The first stage begins as the AB battle their opponents with everything they’ve got. It is also revealed that the eliminated Brawlers get sent to a cruise ship via drones. Nearing the end of the first stage, Dan finds himself completely outmatched by three Brawlers who have decided to team up against him, but he is still determined to defeat them all at any cost.
156	28b	"Battle Royal"; Transliteration: "Batoru Roiyaru" (Japanese: バトルロイヤル)	September 6, 2020 (CAN); October 4, 2020 (US)	October 9, 2020	0.15
Picking up where we left off in the first stage, Dan struggles in his three-one match against the three Brawlers, but Ajit manages to save him. He prepares to battle him despite Drago being worn out in the process, but Ajit declines, saying that he would rather battle him when he’s in top form because it would be more fun that way. Continuing forward, Dan becomes a bit upset that Ajit and Pharol interfered with their battle despite Drago attempting to explain that it was for the best, or else he would have ended up in real trouble. However, Dan replies that they're the strongest pair there is, and that they won’t lose, no matter what. Suddenly, they run into Lia who has been battling nonstop and is already tired out. She suggests to Dan that they team up for the rest of this stage, but he refuses, still believing that he and Drago are the strongest pair there is. As a result, they go their separate ways. Lia is soon confronted by China Riot and Kurin who have teamed up with each other, intending to eliminate her in this stage. They manage to defeat Sairus, but when Lia attempts to roll out Pegatrix, she slips out of her hand and falls over a small cliff. Dan discovers her as Lia calls out to him, asking him to return Pegatrix to her so she can roll her out within the 30-second time limit. Dan does so, and he decides to team up with Lia, having had a change of heart. Together, they summon Pegatrix x Pyrus and defeat Kurin and Riots first Bakugan. To avoid elimination, Kurin and Riot decide to target Dan since Drago is worn out from his previous battles, which will give them the advantage needed to move on to the next stage. Summoning their second Bakugan, they gain the upper hand and nearly defeat Drago, but Dan powers him up with Baku-gear. Before he can finish them off, Brakken, from afar, defeats him, and Dan ends up eliminated as a result, much to the AB’s shock. Although Lia admits her fault in his elimination, Dan advises her to win this competition for him as a drone appears and carries him off the island to the cruise ship.
157	29a	"The Second Stage Begins"; Transliteration: "Sabaiba Rurēsu!" (Japanese: サバイバルレース！)	September 13, 2020 (CAN); October 11, 2020 (US)	October 16, 2020	0.15
With the first stage over, following Dan’s elimination, the second stage is about to begin. Lia starts to feel guilty about the outcome, believing that if he hadn’t fused with her in the first place, he would still be in this competition. Ajit appears and advises the AB to keep brawling for Dan. In the second stage, which is an obstacle course, and still a Battle Royal, the goal is to get to the finishing point within one hour, all while avoiding traps and battling Brawlers along the way. During this stage, Lia gets caught in a trap, but Ajit frees her, and she decides to tag along with him, which he agrees with because it's the right thing to do since it’s important to work as a team, and he easily guides Lia through the traps along the way. Elsewhere, Shun prepares to battle Noah. Wynton decides to assist Shun, but is stopped by the other members of Noah’s team The Glanz Four. Ajit battles Pepe while also declining Lia’s assistance, thinking that he can handle it on his own. However, due to Shun’s attack interference from out of nowhere, and with Pepe distracted, Ajit successfully defeats him. As the rest of the Brawlers regroup, Noah makes amends with Shun for their rematch as he advises him to make it to the next stage. Suddenly, a group of Mechanoids emerge from the ground, preparing to battle the Brawlers as we speak. Benton becomes shocked by their presence because he didn’t approve of them. When he asks Masato about this, his true nature begins to unfold.
158	29b	"Mechanoids Attack!"; Transliteration: "Mekanoido" (Japanese: メカノイド)	September 13, 2020 (CAN); October 11, 2020 (US)	October 16, 2020	0.15
Masato reveals himself as Haavik, having orchestrated the Mechanoid attack on the Brawler's back on the island. The AB begin to recognize them from the time they battled Chad and Trey. They suspect that Haavik is somehow involved in the Bakugan Battle League. Benton decides to put the event on hold for now because of Haaviks interference, and he and the staff attempt to contact the Brawlers, but Haavik stops them from doing so, puts Mr. B to sleep, and takes on his appearance as he lies to the Brawlers, saying that the Mechanoids are one of the special traps in this stage, advising them to break through and reach the finishing point. Advised by Benton to complete the Bakugan Battle League (unaware that Haavik is forcing him to say these words), much to the AB’s confusion, under Ajit’s encouragement, they become determined to defeat the Mechanoids, no matter the cost. However, they are unable to make a dent in them due to their defenses. Ajit advises the AB to ignore the Mechanoids for now and reach the finish line as they fight their way through them. Elsewhere, Haavik explains to Benton that the original Mechanoids chased him from outer space, but he reprogrammed them to do his bidding, which is why he decided to test them out on the Brawlers in the first place in order to make his show a hit. Benton reveals that after Dan spoke of him, he started doing research on him, but he couldn’t find anything about him at all. In the meantime, the AB and Ajit end up cornered by the Mechanoids after reaching a dead end. Suddenly, Riot, Brakken, and Lightning appear, having been chased by the other Mechanoids from their end. They attack the Brawlers, but Trox sets up a crystal rock riser to protect them. However, since he can’t hold it for much longer, Riot prepares to go for an all-out attack despite Lia attempting to stop her, thus leaving herself open for the Mechanoids to attack. Brakken, wanting to protect Lia, intervenes and they both end up defeated and taken away by the drones. Nearly at the brink of defeat, Ajit comes up with an idea and has Pharol lure the Mechanoids away from the AB. He then powers him up with Baku-gear and destroys all but one of them. Despite destroying the last Mechanoid, Pharol ends up defeated in the process. Just as a drone appears preparing to take Ajit away, the AB suddenly realize that he lost on purpose in order to get to where Dan is. Ajit advises them to win the Bakugan Battle League at any cost, and with only twenty minutes remaining in the second stage, the AB prepare to reach the finishing point before time runs out.
159	30a	"The Other Fight, Part 1"; Transliteration: "Sennyū! Nazo no fune" (Japanese: 潜入！謎の船)	September 20, 2020 (CAN); October 18, 2020 (US)	October 23, 2020	0.11
Ajit is taken to a cargo ship by the drone where a Mechanoid puts him to sleep. It takes him to a strange room and is about to put him in a sleep pod, but Ajit awakens and destroys it. It is revealed that Ajit held his breath and pretended to be asleep until the time was right to awaken. He and Pharol then explore the room inside the ship where they discover all of the eliminated Brawlers in sleep pods, deducing that Dan is here as well. He finds him in a sleep pod and frees him from his stasis. Dan begins to remember that when the drone took him away from the island, instead of being taken to the cruise ship, he was taken to a cargo ship and put to sleep by a Mechanoid. Ajit informs him about the Mechanoids invading the Bakugan Battle League, and Dan suspects that Haavik is behind all of this. In order to stop him, they prepare to free everyone from the sleep pods. However, Dan discovers that his Bakugan are missing, including the other Brawlers as well, having been taken in the process. Ajit recommends that they search the whole ship until they find them, but with all the Mechanoids patrolling the hallways, they return to the room where he found Dan. Ajit tells him his plan where they will wait until a Mechanoid brings in an eliminated Brawler, that way when it takes their Bakugan, they will follow it and find out where they’re keeping the Bakugan. Dan suddenly realizes that Ajit lost on purpose in order to get to him because his friends couldn’t find a way to contact him, which was his plan all along. The plan goes into motion as a Mechanoid puts Kurin in a sleep pod and takes his Bakugan, then they follow it to a room where they discover all of the captured Bakugan, but Drago is nowhere to be seen. Suddenly, Storm confronts them and initiates a Bakugan battle using his Fusion Bakugan called Hydranoid x Aquos, confirming that Haavik and the others are behind this monstrosity. Ajit battles him, but the Fusion Bakugan is too powerful for him to handle, so he summons Auxillataur to assist Pharol. Dan prepares to assist him as well, but he advises him to go find Drago. Storm attempts to stop him, but Ajit clears a path, giving Dan enough time to escape. While searching for Drago, much to his shock, he runs into Magnus.
160	30b	"The Other Fight, Part 2"; Transliteration: "Osorubeki Keikaku" (Japanese: 恐るべき計画)	September 20, 2020 (CAN); October 18, 2020 (US)	October 23, 2020	0.11
Dan discovers Magnus in the cargo ship as he saves him from a Mechanoid. He begins to explain that during his mission to shut down the black market for illegal devices, he’s been after a gang behind this monstrosity. Despite foiling a lot of their sales, he was still unable to get any information on the leader in charge of all this. After McQ escaped, he started tracking him again, which is how he learned about Haavik and his master plan. Since he didn’t know all the details, he infiltrated this ship and waited for the right moment to make his move, until Dan showed up. Magnus seeks to foil Haaviks plan and asks Dan to accompany him in order to accomplish his goal, to which Dan begrudgingly agrees since he shares the same goal as he does. Continuing their search for Drago, Dan and Magnus discover their research laboratory that develops Mechanoids, as well as Drago. Magnus explains that they’ve built a factory to produce large quantities of them. By the time he arrived, the factory was already abandoned and destroyed completely, the same one that the AB were at when they took on Haavik and his group. Not only were they researching Mechanoids, they were also researching Fusion Bakugan. Because of that, Haavik has been creating Fusion Bakugan nonstop. He suspects that Haavik captured Drago because he wanted to create a stronger Fusion Bakugan, which is why he was being kept here in the first place. After freeing Drago, Magnus reveals to Dan that since they’ve infiltrated the Bakugan Battle League, they plan on destroying it, and he also reveals that Haavik’s real plan is to destroy all of Tokyo, much to Dan’s shock. Since he hasn’t figured out how he plans on doing it yet, the only way to stop his goal is to take back all of the stolen Bakugan, and free all the Brawlers from their sleep pods. Meanwhile, Ajit is still struggling in his battle against Storm due to the power of his Fusion Bakugan. However, he refuses to back down, having chosen to walk the same path as the AB since they’ve chosen to accept him for who he really is, and because of that, he becomes determined to defeat Storm, no matter the cost. Nearly defeated, Dan and Magnus return to assist him. However, Magnus advises them to go retrieve the Bakugan and free the Brawlers while he holds off Storm for as long as possible. Despite his upper hand at the start, he is still no match for Storm as he reveals to him that their plans have already started. Dan and Ajit race back to retrieve the stolen Bakugan, but much to their shock, they have all disappeared without a trace.
161	31a	"The Bakugan Battle League Dash"; Transliteration: "Haran no Sekando Sutēji!!" (Japanese: 波乱のセカンドステージ！！)	September 27, 2020 (CAN); October 25, 2020 (US) (Note: These episodes were first released on the Cartoon Network app and video-on-demand services on September 25, 2020.)	October 30, 2020	0.16
The remaining AB become determined to reach the end of the second stage in order to make it to the final stage for Dan and Ajit. While racing towards the finish line, they run into the Rowdy Reds who attempt to battle them, much to their surprise since they’ve gotten a lot stronger since then and have already come a long way to this stage. Left with no other choice, the AB decide to battle them. During the battle, the Rowdy Reds gain the upper hand as the AB attempt to convince them to accompany them to the finish line. They refuse, still seeking to defeat them because they want to make up for cheating in the last Bakugan Battle League. The Rowdy Reds begin to explain that they started watching the AB’s videos every day while studying their moves, which is why they want to show them just how strong they really are. Motivated by their Bakugan, the AB make a comeback and successfully defeat the Rowdy Reds as they encourage them to win it all before being taken away. With only three minutes remaining, the AB race to the finish line as fast as possible. Before they can reach it, a group of Mechanoids sent by Haavik appear and attempt to stop the AB, but determined to win this, they power up their Bakugan with Baku-gear and charge through them, crossing the finish line just in time, and making it to the final stage. Much to their surprise, they learn that Marco, Chad, and Chester have also made it as well. While resting up, the AB, knowing that Haavik is involved in this event, deduce that the last stage is going to have something worse than Mechanoids. Getting into the final stage, three ninjas appear (unaware that they’re McQ, Everett, and Sophie) and summon their Fusion Bakugan (consisting of Garganoid x Darkus, Cyndeous x Pyrus, and Cloptor x Darkus), intending to defeat the Brawlers, including the AB once and for all.
162	31b	"The Final Stage"; Transliteration: "Shōgeki no Fainaru Sutēji!!" (Japanese: 衝撃のファイナルステージ！！)	September 27, 2020 (CAN); October 25, 2020 (US)	October 30, 2020	0.16
The AB prepare to battle the ninjas (McQ, Sophie, and Everett) as they summon their Fusion Bakugan. However, they start off by eliminating Marco, Chad, and Chester quickly in the final stage. Despite the ninjas using devices in this stage, the AB become determined to defeat them and win this Bakugan Battle League for Dan, Ajit, and themselves no matter what. As the battle commences, the ninjas (McQ, Sophie, and Everett) gain the upper hand with their Fusion Bakugan, then they reveal themselves to the AB, confirming Haavik’s involvement in all this to begin with. Nearly at the brink of defeat due to the power of their Fusion Bakugan, the AB, seeking to honor the eliminated Brawlers, including Dan and Ajit who have put their trust in them to win as always, tap into the belief of all the Brawlers worldwide, and as a result, they make a successful comeback and successfully defeat McQ, Everett, and Sophie. As the AB prepare to face each other in order to come out as the one and true champion since they’re the only Brawlers remaining in this stage, Haavik appears and reveals to them that the Bakugan Battle League was just the beginning of his real plan. In a shocking turn of events, he sends an army of mind controlled Bakugan to Tokyo, intending to destroy the city for his own amusement, leaving the AB completely shocked by what they have just witnessed.
163	32a	"The Tokyo Catastrophe"; Transliteration: "Tōkyō Kaimetsu!?" (Japanese: 東京壊滅！？)	October 4, 2020 (CAN); November 8, 2020 (US)	November 6, 2020	0.08
The AB discover that Haavik has unleashed an army of mind-controlled Bakugan as they make their way to Tokyo, intending to destroy the city for his own amusement. Wondering how they’re being controlled in the first place, Haavik reveals to them that he’s been capturing the energy produced by the Bakugan battles and storing it into his energy condenser, which he then transfers back to the Bakugan on his ship, which in turn allows him to take full control of them in order to fulfill his goal. He then escapes to watch the destruction of Tokyo. Benton contacts the AB and asks for their help in stopping Haavik from destroying Tokyo. As the Bakugan make their way to the city, Magnus, having escaped from Storm, intercepts them, still determined to protect Tokyo as he begins to battle as many of them as possible. Benton instructs Shun and Lia to intercept the Bakugan heading towards Tokyo while he instructs Wynton and Lightning to accompany him to deal with the condenser, located in an area not included in the island blueprint that’s just beyond that door. Meanwhile, Dan and Ajit race back to the room where the Brawlers are being held despite Dan being concerned about going after the Bakugan. Ajit theorizes that Haavik is using the Brawlers to control their Bakugan, and Dan believes that if they free them, they’ll be able to stop the Bakugan once and for all. Haavik intercepts them and confirms Ajit’s theory, revealing that he is manipulating the Brawlers brainwaves, which in turn gives him complete control of their Bakugan. He then initiates a Bakugan battle with Dan and Ajit as he easily gains the upper hand, leaving them completely outmatched by his power level. Storm informs him that Benton is attempting to shut down the condenser, but Haavik brushes it off, saying that he still has enough energy to keep the Bakugan under his control long enough to complete his goal, even if he does succeed in shutting down the condenser. In the meantime, Magnus continues to hold the line, until Shun and Lia arrive to assist him, having been sent by Benton. They put up a massive fight, but Magnus is defeated in the process. Still fighting Haavik, Dan is left at a standstill as he is unable to defeat him. In a shocking turn of events, Haavik prepares to finish them off. Dan and Drago are soon left to their fates.
164	32b	"Bakugan Battle League Finale"; Transliteration: "Baku Gēmu Fināre!" (Japanese: 爆ゲーム・フィナーレ！)	October 4, 2020 (CAN); November 8, 2020 (US)	November 6, 2020	0.08
Haavik is about to finish off Dan and Drago, but Wynton manages to save them, having been sent by Benton. Dan and Ajit inform him about Haavik’s plan involving the captured Brawlers and their Bakugan and instructs him to free them all, which will stop the Bakugan rampage once and for all while they continue to hold off Haavik for as long as possible. Meanwhile, Shun and Lia continue to hold the line on all the Bakugan, but they manage to break through. Before they can reach Tokyo, they all revert to their ball forms, and it is revealed that Wynton has succeeded in freeing all the Brawlers from their stasis, as well as getting them all safely off the ship. Just when things seem to be over, Haavik initiates his backup plan as the cargo ship transforms into a giant Mechanoid, which will destroy Tokyo in the Bakugan’s place. Dan and Drago attempt to stop it, aided by the rest of the AB, but due to its power from the condenser, they are no match for it, and as a result from Haavik’s interference, Dan and Drago end up defeated as they plunge into the ocean, but luckily, Magnus (unseen) manages to save them. Dan recovers quickly as he forms Drago x Darkus with Lightning and reunites with the AB as they prepare to stop Haavik’s giant Mechanoid from destroying Tokyo. Suddenly, a surge of energy appears from out of nowhere as it merges with their Bakugan, including Ajit’s. Benton contacts them and reveals that he’s taking the energy from the condenser and sending it to all of them. It is revealed that his actual plan was to take control of the condenser, rather than shut it down because he wanted to put the energy to good use. As a result, the AB’s Bakugan (including Ajit’s) obtain Fusion Baku-gear, much to their surprise. Using their new advantage, they successfully destroy the Mechanoid. In the aftermath, since Magnus rescued everyone’s Bakugan, Benton announces the continuation of the Bakugan Battle League, much to everyone’s shock. But since Haavik ruined it from the start, and with only four Brawlers remaining, Lia, Wynton, Shun, and Lightning are declared as co-champions of the Bakugan Battle League Tokyo Edition as they celebrate in honor of their new founded victory.
165	33a	"Champion of the Universe, Dan!"; Transliteration: "Uchū Chanpion Dan!" (Japanese: 宇宙チャンピオン・ダン！)	October 11, 2020 (CAN); November 15, 2020 (US)	November 13, 2020	0.11
Benton asks Dan to allow Ajit to stay with him at his house for a while because it’s part of his transition into a normal life, and it will give him the opportunity to experience life in a traditional household; Dan happily agrees. Things start off well in the household as Dan’s parents begin to take a liking to him because he chose to help with the household chores without being asked since this is all new to him for starters. Around bedtime, Dan suddenly begins to sleepwalk, as well as rolling out Drago in his sleep. Ajit attempts to stop him, which doesn’t go so well. The next day, Ajit tells the AB about the incident from last night. They too are also concerned about Dan’s sleep problem, which will eventually lead to more trouble if this continues any further. To solve this problem, Wynton suggests sending Ajit into Dan’s dream in order to determine the cause. Using high tech equipment, the AB succeed in sending Ajit into Dan’s mind. Lightning, whom the AB sent in after him, and who has the ability to speak in this world, accompanies him as they head towards their dream destination (the dream that is causing Dan to sleepwalk). Upon arrival, they discover Dan’s dream where everyone sees him as the Champion of the Universe. Lightning concludes that the only way to stop his snoring and sleepwalking for good is to defeat him in a Bakugan battle. Eventually, Dan spots them and challenges them to a battle which they accept. However, because they’re in his dream, Dan uses various tricks to his advantage since everything is designed to work in his favor. In a turn of events, Lightning advises Ajit to turn the tide in his favor because it's not only Dan’s dream, but their dream as well. Using his new advantage, Ajit creates Dan’s worst nightmare, causing him to lower his guard. He then makes a comeback and successfully defeats him, causing Dan to wake up from his nightmare all of a sudden. The next day, the AB inform Ajit that Dan’s sleep problem is now under control, meaning that he has stopped sleepwalking for good, thanks to Lightning. He then checks on Dan who is now back to normal, having given up his dream of being the Champion of the Universe.
166	33b	"Operation Babysitter"; Transliteration: "Akachan wa Bakugan ga o Suki!" (Japanese: 赤ちゃんは爆丸がお好き！)	October 11, 2020 (CAN); November 15, 2020 (US)	November 13, 2020	0.11
Ajit asks for Wynton's help babysitting since his volunteer work is part of it; Wynton happily agrees. The next day, Ajit and Wynton are left in charge of babysitting a toddler named Aiden, which proves to be a hard struggle. Wynton gives Ajit some advice by telling him that the most important thing to do when babysitting is to stay cool and show them that they’re just here to have fun since they can pick up on people’s emotions somehow. They then bring Aiden to the garage where his tricycle is being kept. They even decorate it as well, but Aiden suddenly goes missing. Before they can begin their search, Aiden returns and shows them his Bakugan that he found when he ran off, much to their surprise. When he summons it, revealed to be a Krakelios, he gets scared and ends up bursting into tears, the same happening to his Bakugan as well since they’re linked on an emotional level like all Brawlers are with their Bakugan. Wynton attempts to calm Aiden down but is unsuccessful, same for Ajit who is having trouble dealing with Krakelios in this state. Remembering Wynton’s advice, Ajit asks Aiden to battle with him because it will be fun for him and his Bakugan. While battling him, Ajit becomes impressed with his skills despite his young age, especially with his mastery over Baku-gear. Nevertheless, they decide to continue with their battle all day long. After battling nonstop, Ajit and Wynton successfully put Aiden to sleep just as his mother returns home.
167	34a	"Bestie Team Battle"; Transliteration: "Yūjō Taggu" (Japanese: 友情タッグ)	October 18, 2020 (CAN); November 22, 2020 (US)	November 20, 2020	0.13
China Riot tells the AB that she needs a partner for the tag team tournament, having accepted an invitation to be the main event in the process. Upon seeing Emily since she was expecting her, she decides to make her her Brawling partner. She prepares to get Emily trained for the tournament, but Emily wants to earn her friendship by getting to know her first, much to her reluctance. However, Riot becomes annoyed by Emily’s soft personality when she suggests doing a few things first before battling, believing that she’s wasting her time. As a result, she forces Emily into battle, but it doesn’t last long as Riot ends up defeating her quickly. Believing that Emily is incapable of participating in this tournament because she always takes things too lightly, especially when losing, Riot refuses to have her as her partner and sends her away. She decides to find other Brawlers, whom she’s willing to pay to be her partner. The next day, Emily returns and asks if she can train in her yard; Riot reluctantly agrees. Despite watching her training, Riot is still having a hard time believing that she’s starting to take it seriously now. As time passes, Emily improves her training, much to Riot’s suspicions. When she confronts her about it, Emily explains that although she wants to be in the tournament with her, she also wants to be her friend, having been serious about it from yesterday and today. She admits that the reason she was unprepared from the start was because her excitement to train with her distracted her. Emily also believes that she’ll get stronger if she has Riot as her partner. Touched by her words, Riot decides to accept Emily not only as her partner, but also as her friend. As a result, Emily continues her training as Riot pushes her to become the best. In the tournament, Riot and Emily manage to reach the finals as they prepare to face their two opponents known as the twin Brawlers. As the battle commences, the twins start off by entrapping Emily, then they target Riot, all according to plan. They also start to make fun of their friendship, calling it flimsy in the process. As a result, Emily flies into a rage, unleashes her fighting spirit, and defeats the twins in one hit, thus winning the finals. In the aftermath, Riot and Emily decide to maintain their friendship for a long time.
168	34b	"Ajit and Lia"; Transliteration: "Ajitto Mitchaku 24-ji!" (Japanese: アジット密着24時！)	October 18, 2020 (CAN); November 22, 2020 (US)	November 20, 2020	0.13
Lia tells the AB that she plans on doing an interview with Ajit about the life he lived before, and how he ended up with Golden Bakugan as his partners. She finds him working as a security guard at a museum and asks to interview him. Ajit declines at first because he’s helping out with security to make sure that no art gets stolen by any thieves, but he changes his mind when she decides to do it during his guard duties after getting permission from the museum staff. After locking up the museum, Lia starts her interview with Ajit as he begins to reflect on his origin story on why he became a phantom thief in the first place. However, the interview is cut short when a thief named Parker breaks into the museum. Ajit confronts him and discovers that he knows who he is, but still, he becomes determined to stop him no matter what. This results in an ensuing Bakugan battle where Parker starts pulling off dirty tricks. He reveals to Ajit that he always admired him and Storm, which is why he wanted to be a phantom thief in the first place. Despite using Baku-gear, Ajit successfully defeats him and snatches his Bakugan. In the aftermath, Ajit becomes impressed with their battle they just had despite his lack of skill in Bakugan battling. He tells him that Bakugan battling can show him a world that’s much bigger and more fun than life as a phantom thief. Not only that, he’ll be able to make lots of friends like he has. Liking the idea, Parker asks Ajit if he can battle with him again sometime; Ajit happily agrees. Despite the interruption of her interview, Lia doesn’t mind the outcome, because deep down, she knows that Bakugan battling is the best way of life for everyone.
169	35a	"Once More into the Maze"; Transliteration: "Nerawareta Gōrudo Bakugan" (Japanese: 狙われたゴールド爆丸)	October 25, 2020 (CAN); November 29, 2020 (US)	November 27, 2020	0.09
The AB are left wondering on how Ajit was able to partner up with Golden Bakugan from the start, but Ajit says that he doesn’t know anything. The only thing that he remembers is meeting them when he was inside some strange ruins, but he lost track of that location overtime. Suddenly, Benton contacts the AB and informs them that Storm, Everett, Sophie, and McQ are at the Great Core Cell temple in the Yucatan Peninsula, having set up security cameras there to keep an eye on it. He suspects that they’re up to something and instructs the AB to stop them at any cost. At the temple, Storm reveals to the group that his former apprentice Ajit suddenly disappeared the last time he was there. When he found him, he discovered that he was carrying Golden Bakugan, which he found in the maze. They become determined to find and capture these Bakugan in order to use them for their own purposes, such as taking down the AB. McQ uses a device similar to that of a mobile gate as they enter the maze. Once inside, they start arguing over which way to go. After traveling in the maze for a long time, all while avoiding dangerous obstacles, the group is already worn out and hungry, so they decide to have a quick meal. Meanwhile, the AB are preparing to go to the Yucatan Peninsula, but since that place is far away, they decide to travel through the maze via the mobile gate. After entering the maze, they encounter Storm’s group and deduce that they're after the Golden Bakugan. This leads to a powerful battle between their Fusion Bakugan. However, in the midst of the battle, the group combine their powers and pull off a massive attack (which doesn’t hit the AB at first). Before they can do it again, an unknown vortex suddenly appears as everyone starts to sink into it, taking them to different unknown places within the maze.
170	35b	"Grandpas in the Wild"; Transliteration: "Winton wa ojīchan" (Japanese: ウィントンはおじいちゃん)	October 25, 2020 (CAN); November 29, 2020 (US)	November 27, 2020	0.09
The AB travel through the unknown vortex, getting separated in the process. Wynton and Lightning end up in a strange place they haven’t seen before in the maze. They become determined to regroup with Dan and the others as soon as they find a way out of this place. Suddenly, in a shocking turn of events, Wynton and Lightning discover that they have rapidly aged, deducing that the maze did this to them. Determined to escape from this place, thinking that they’ll go back to normal once they do so, Wynton, Lightning, and their Bakugan travel through the exit gateway as they begin to wonder why they can’t grow big in this place to begin with. Reaching a doorway, they discover two Golden Bakugan, and they manage to wake one of them up. The Golden Bakugan, whose name is Zellus, praises them for waking her up, much to their shock. Despite their attempt to ask for her help in reversing the aging effect on Wynton and Lightning, Zellus discovers that they are all small for some reason, believing that their powers have all been sealed by another Aurelus Bakugan like her. Suddenly, an elderly lady, revealed to be Sophie appears (having been affected by the same effect in the maze just like Wynton and Lightning) and attempts to capture Zellus. Sophie manages to knock down Zellus due to her weakened state since she just woke up from her sleep. Before she can finish her off, Wynton intervenes and distracts Cloptor x Darkus, causing him to fall through a weakened floor. Wynton reveals that he took the time to have a look around this place, which is why he waited for the right moment to lead Cloptor x Darkus to that weakened floor in order to trap him. He and Lightning become determined to protect all Bakugan no matter what despite their old age. Touched by their strong beliefs and inspired by their fighting spirits, a Fusion Core suddenly appears and calls out to Trox and Zellus. Wynton uses the Fusion Core to fuse Trox and Zellus together, forming Trox x Aurelus. Using his new Fusion Bakugan, he successfully defeats Sophie. She soon leaves while swearing revenge on them. In the aftermath, Zellus successfully restores Wynton and Lightning’s youth, and as a show of gratitude for saving her and Etris from Sophie, she decides to entrust Etris to Wynton, believing that his strength will come in handy at some point. Deducing that Sophie and the others are still out there looking for Golden Bakugan, Wynton and Lightning become determined to regroup with the other AB so that they can stop her and the others once and for all.
171	36a	"The Past Revealed"; Transliteration: "Kogane no Kioku" (Japanese: 黄金の記憶)	November 1, 2020 (CAN); December 6, 2020 (US) (Note: These episodes were first released on the Cartoon Network app and video-on-demand services on November 27, 2020.)	December 4, 2020	0.10
Lia and Ajit end up in a place they haven’t seen before in the maze after getting separated from the other AB. They soon realize that their Bakugan can’t grow big for starters, making it hard for them to find the others. In a surprising turn of events, the maze gives them a visual of Dan and Shun in a separate part of the maze, same for Wynton and Lightning, much to their relief now that they’re safe. When Lia mentions the Great Core Cell Temple, and after getting a visual of it, in which she feels relieved that it’s now safe, thinking that Haavik and Storm were gonna go after it to begin with, Ajit suddenly regains all of his memories somehow, having been to that place before. He then offers to tell Lia the full story of how he met Pharol and Auxillataur for the first time, and how he became their partner. He went with Storm to look for some treasure in some ruins in the Yucatan Peninsula. That’s when he discovered a gateway, entered it, and found himself in the maze, which he hadn't known about before. He approached a Core Cell (which he was unaware about before), but it suddenly took him to another part of the maze where he ended up exploring this place, all while avoiding dangerous obstacles. While trying to find a way out, he discovered two Golden Bakugan (revealed to be Pharol and Auxillataur), which he didn’t know about before then. Ajit eventually realizes that Pharol and Auxillataur were the ones that called to him, having been exposed to the light and energy of the Core Cell that was attached to him before he found them, which they responded to immediately, which is why they became bound with him in the first place. Ajit continues with the story where he encountered Tiko all of a sudden, much to his shock. That’s when Pharol and Auxillatuar came to his rescue and started battling him, but since they haven’t fully recovered yet, Auxillataur states that the only way to take him down is to use their remaining power. Following the blast, he was suddenly brought back out of the maze to safety just as Storm found him all of a sudden. Ajit deduces that when he was pulled out by that light, he somehow lost all of his memories of his time in the maze, which is why he couldn’t explain his connection to the Golden Bakugan in the first place. He also remembers the time when he and Pharol met for the first time face to face when a mysterious light covered the entire Earth, following the end of the battle against Tiko. Auxillataur explains that a huge amount of energy flowed into them from the light that fell from the sky, but it was more than that. Pharol says that Ajit’s strong feelings allowed him and Auxillataur to awaken from their slumber while Lia states that since their hearts were connected somehow, they were able to establish an unbreakable bond, which explains how Ajit was able to partner up with them in the first place. Suddenly, Storm confronts Ajit and Lia, causing them to flee from him since they're at a disadvantage in this part of the maze because their Bakugan can’t grow big here to begin with. Storm gives chase and attempts to capture them, but a bunch of wild plants that Ajit ticked off restrain Hydranoid x Aquos, giving him and Lia enough time to escape. Frustrated that he lost them, Storm leaves through the gateway, still determined to find them again in order to exact his revenge.
172	36b	"Run! A Storm's on the Way"; Transliteration: "Semari Kuru Sutōmu" (Japanese: 迫りくるストーム)	November 1, 2020 (CAN); December 6, 2020 (US)	December 4, 2020	0.10
After escaping from Storm, Ajit and Lia travel through the maze and end up in a place that Lia recognizes. The last time she was there was when the AB battled Strata who was holding a bunch of Bakugan captive, but they managed to rescue them. Ajit begins to remember that after he found Pharol and Auxillataur, he showed them to Storm, and he allowed him to keep them. Because he changed, meaning that he has no soft spot and no longer cares about Ajit, they become determined to keep him and his group from finding and capturing the Golden Bakugan. Suddenly, Storm appears as he starts to chase after them. Ajit and Lia use the warp tunnels in an attempt to throw him off the trail since the space within these buildings are all twisted up; every time they go in one way, they come out another way, in the form of a super complicated pattern, making it hard for Storm to catch them. While hiding from Storm, they discover a Golden Bakucore, but since their Bakugan can’t grow big, including Pharol, they won’t be able to use it. Suddenly, the lights from the exits begin to disappear, and it is revealed that Storm is trying to lure them out from their hiding spot by destroying the entrances. Luckily, Ajit and Lia manage to escape, only to be cornered by Storm. However, in a surprising turn of events, Goreene appears and manages to save them. Lia tells him that they’re Bakugan can't grow big somehow, and Goreene admits that it was his fault that this happened. He explains that they got hit by lightning, which causes Bakugan to stay stuck in their small form for a long period of time. He found out about Storm’s intrusion in the maze, including his group and decided to act fast without a second thought, and that he wasn’t expecting Lia to be here for starters. Hydranoid x Aqous gains the upper hand on Goreene, leaving him in a barely weakened state. Determined to help him, Ajit and Lia decide to find the Golden Bakucore from inside the warp tunnels. Storm on the other hand continues to beat Goreene to a pulp. Lia manages to locate the Bakucore and powers up Goreene with it just before Storm can finish him off, giving him the upper hand in the process. Despite being in a weakened state, Goreene is still determined to protect both Ajit and Lia. Suddenly, a Fusion Core appears which Lia uses to fuse Pegatrix and Goreene together, forming Pegatrix x Aurelus. Using her new Fusion Bakugan, she successfully defeats Storm who disappears while swearing revenge on them. In the aftermath, since Goreene couldn't handle staying in fusion form any longer, Ajit suggests that he rest for a while, but he refuses, still seeking to stop Storm and the others from going after the Golden Bakugan that slumber within the maze. When they ask where Dan and the others are, Goreene opens up a gateway as Ajit and Lia follow him inside, still determined to regroup with the other AB so that they can stop Storm and the others from reaching the Golden Bakugan once and for all.
173	37a	"Golden Bakugan Encounter"; Transliteration: "Tarino to no Saikai" (Japanese: タリノとの再会)	November 8, 2020 (CAN); December 13, 2020 (US)	December 11, 2020	0.19
Dan and Shun travel through the maze in search of the other AB. What’s worse is that their Bakugan can’t grow big somehow. They soon learn that the area they’re in is the exact same one where the laws of gravity are different here than on the surface. After Shun enjoys himself for a while, persuaded by Dan, they discover McQ who is still looking for the Golden Bakugan. Much to their surprise, they encounter Trhyno, having recovered from his hibernation. He begins to explain that after the Drome covered the entire Earth, its powerful light revived him. Trhyno attempts to persuade Dan and Shun to flee from him because McQ is searching for them, not to mention that he’s unable to stop him himself because he’s not at his full strength yet since he just woke up, but they refuse, still determined to protect him no matter what. Shun advises Dan to stay with Trhyno while he attempts to lure McQ away from them since he holds a grudge against him to begin with. He uses the law of gravity to his advantage as McQ attempts to capture him. However, the gravity suddenly takes a turn for the worse and Shun ends up captured by McQ. Before he can finish him off, Trhyno intervenes and saves him. However, since he’s not at full strength yet, Garganoid x Darkus wounds him severely. Shun comes to Trhyno’s defense, still determined to protect him from McQ despite Trhyno attempting to plead to Shun to flee for his own safety. Suddenly, a Fusion Core appears which Shun uses to fuse Hydorous and Trhyno together, forming Hydorous x Aurelus. Using his new Fusion Bakugan, he incapacitates McQ. However, Everett arrives to assist him, leaving them completely outmatched. Luckily, Lightning and Etris arrive to assist them, and as a result, he fuses Howlkor and Etris together, forming Howlkor x Aurleus. Together, they successfully defeat McQ and Everett, causing them to retreat for now as Wynton reunites with the group. In the aftermath, Wynton explains that Etris woke up while he and Lightning were waiting for them. He told him that Storm and the others were planning to capture him and the other Golden Bakugan in order to use them for their own purposes, but he was determined to fight back against them despite Zellus pleading for him not to since they’re not at their full strength yet, and he became fascinated with the idea to fuse with them. After Trhyno thanks Shun for saving him, Goreene arrives with Lia and Ajit, signifying that the AB are all back together again. Elsewhere, Storm and the others have regrouped and are still determined to capture the Golden Bakugan no matter what.
174	37b	"Ties of Gold"; Transliteration: "Kogane no Senshi-Tachi" (Japanese: 黄金の戦士たち)	November 8, 2020 (CAN); December 13, 2020 (US)	December 11, 2020	0.19
With the AB reunited once again, they attempt to find a way to deal with Storm and the others. Goreene mentions a special sanctuary that is impossible to enter, especially for humans, believing that they’ll be safe there. However, the gateway can only take them to an area where the entrance to that place is located. Trhyno recognizes Ajit since he heard about him from Dan and the others. He found out that he was the one that woke Pharol and Auxillatuar from their slumber, and how they were able to form a special bond with him. As a result, he gives him his thanks and advises him to continue to take care of them, much to his delight. During their journey to the sanctuary, they run into Storm and the others who are still determined to capture the Golden Bakugan no matter what. McQ begins to explain that he secretly placed a tracking device on Shun during their last encounter, which allowed them to follow the AB, thinking they were with the Golden Bakugan to begin with. Determined to protect them, the AB (with the exception of Dan and Ajit) initiate a Bakugan battle using their new Fusion Bakugan. However, they become suspicious when they start evading them without striking back for some reason. Eventually, the AB’s Bakugan become worn out in the process, and McQ reveals that they heard everything they said from the tracker, having figured that the Golden Bakugan were still weak when they faction fused, deducing that they would run out of power eventually, which is why they evaded them in the first place, all according to plan. They then use their special move and successfully defeat the AB. Storm captures the Golden Bakugan as he and the others escape from the maze, unaware that Dan and Ajit have followed them. They confront the group, determined to take back the Golden Bakugan that they stole from them. Because they left the maze, Goreene’s ability has worn off from their Bakugan, meaning that they can battle again. Dan and Ajit battle the group with everything that they’ve got, but they are still no match for their Fusion Bakugan. As a result, they defeat most of their Bakugan, with Storm capturing Auxillataur for starters. Left at a standstill, Ajit soon realizes that he can’t do anything by himself; however, because he met Pharol and Auxillataur, he was able to learn about Bakugan and battling. He says that they changed him for the better, and as a result of his confidence and determination, he fuses Pharol and Gillator together, forming Pharol x Pyrus. The group attempt to use their special move once again, but Pharol x Pyrus counters it and successfully defeats them. Afterwards, Ajit forces them to return the Golden Bakugan to him, including Auxillataur, and they eventually comply. In the aftermath, the Golden Bakugan thank the AB for saving them. As a show of gratitude, Trhyno tells them that if they’re ever in trouble, especially in difficult situations, all they must do is call them, that way, they’ll be able to lend them their strength as Dan advises them to go take a long rest. In the end, Ajit becomes satisfied that Pharol and Auxillataur will always be by his side no matter what.
175	38a	"Nightmare"; Transliteration: "Akumu no Hajimari" (Japanese: 悪夢の始まり)	November 15, 2020 (CAN); December 20, 2020 (US)	December 18, 2020	0.22
Dan has a nightmare where he and Drago are causing destruction everywhere. The next day, he tells his friends that he hasn’t been sleeping well lately because of his crazy dreams and he doesn’t have any recollection of what happens in them to begin with; therefore, he’s not himself lately. When he goes to sleep again, he finds himself in the same dream from last night, causing mayhem and destruction. Eventually, he snaps himself out of it and realizes what he has done in the process. He soon discovers Haavik who reveals to him that he snuck into his dreams while he was asleep, which Dan deduces as the cause of his nightmares. Haavik explains that he became frustrated ever since he and his friends thwarted his attempt to destroy Tokyo during the Bakugan Battle League Tokyo Edition. He then challenges Dan to a Bakugan battle where he offers to release him from his dream if he wins; however, if Haavik wins, Dan will become trapped here forever; Dan accepts his terms, knowing that he would never back down from a Bakugan battle. He follows him up to where the battle will take place and finds himself in outer space. As the battle commences, because this is his dream, Dan uses it to his advantage, such as summoning Baku-gear and Fusions very quickly. He defeats Fangzor x Aquos, but he suddenly comes back out. Haavik reveals that they share the same dream, meaning that he can do whatever he wants to just like him because of his powers. He then reveals his origin story to him where it is revealed that he traveled from planet to planet putting on his “show” by either using his own powers, or manipulating the inhabitants of those planets to cause mayhem and destruction for his own amusement. He also shows him the destruction of a planet as an example of his powers, shocking Dan in the process. Haavik says that he could easily destroy Earth that merged with Vestroia, but he decides not to, at least not yet because he still wants to have more fun to begin with; in other words, he wants to continue spreading mayhem and destruction across that planet for his own amusement. Continuing with the battle, with Dan left at a hesitation, knowing that he can’t win against Haavik because of what he can do with his powers, Haavik successfully defeats him. As a result of his victory, he reveals his true form and puts Dan under his control as he said he would. The next day, “Dan” wakes up, feeling great as usual, much to Drago’s satisfaction. However, he is completely unaware that Dan has been taken over by Haavik who plans to use him for his own amusement.
176	38b	"Bad Dan"; Transliteration: "Aku Dan" (Japanese: 悪ダン)	November 15, 2020 (CAN); December 20, 2020 (US)	December 18, 2020	0.22
Under Haavik’s control, “Dan” starts to cause trouble in the household to begin with. He forces Drago to destroy Studio D, but he refuses because he’s concerned about the way he’s acting. As a result, he uses a corrupted Bakucore on him and forces him to carry out his demand. Before doing so, Pharol intervenes. Ajit confronts “Dan,” thinking that he’s still sleepwalking, but he says that he’s not. He then orders Drago to destroy Studio D, driving out the other AB in the process. He then summons his other Bakugan as he orders them to cause destruction to Los Volmos. The AB catch up to “Dan” and initiate a Bakugan battle as they summon their Fusion Bakugan in an attempt to stop him. They suddenly realize that Dan is under Haavik’s control after witnessing his mark on him. They try to get through to him, but are unsuccessful. Left with no other choice, the AB defeat all of “Dan’s” Bakugan, but he begins to roll them out repeatedly. Wynton deduces that he’s forcing them to continue battling even though they’re all worn out, which could cause a lot of damage to them. After a lengthy battle, Cyndeous and Gillator are too tired to continue and return to ball form, much to “Dan’s” dissatisfaction. The AB attempt to catch him, but he retreats with Drago, leaving them completely worried by what he has become due to Haavik’s control over him.
177	39a	"Dusk Industries Under Attack"; Transliteration: "Dan o Yamero" (Japanese: ダンを止めろ)	November 21, 2020 (CAN); December 27, 2020 (US)	December 25, 2020	0.12
The AB start to feel bad about Dan falling under Haavik’s control, knowing that he wasn’t himself to begin with. Elsewhere, “Dan” has gotten frustrated from his loss against the AB, thinking that his Bakugan are too weak to handle their Fusion Bakugan. Haavik decides to give him his Fusion Bakugan as he prepares for his next “show,” joined by Sophie, McQ, Everett, and Storm. They start attacking Dusk Industries where Benton discovers “Dan” leading the assault along with the other members of Haavik’s Thrall (except for Storm who decides not to join in). The AB soon learn about the attack from a live video feed and discover the Fusion Bakugan causing damage to Dusk Industries alongside “Dan,” as well as the AAAnimus Security Force attempting to stop them. Determined to save Dan and bring him back to normal, the AB head to Dusk Industries as fast as possible. Meanwhile, the destruction continues as the group easily takes down the Security Force Bakugan one by one. The AB arrive and inform Benton that Dan is not himself because he is under Haavik’s control. “Dan” gets frustrated about the Drome for starters because everything that was smashed will go back to normal. McQ deduces that if they take down all of the Security Force Bakugan, then it will disappear, that way, they can continue with their destruction, and the damage will be permanent. “Dan” discovers the AB at Dusk Industries as they engage in a Baku-battle against Haavik’s Thrall (joined by Storm who decided to join in apparently). He then leaves to deal with the Security Force as he continues to pummel them. Magnus arrives all of a sudden and prepares to battle “Dan” with his Fusion Bakugan Nillious x Darkus, easily gaining the upper hand on him. He eventually finds out that Dan is under Haavik’s control, making him think back on that time when he was taken over by the V-virus and turned into Tiko’s puppet. Remembering what he did for him back then, Magnus becomes determined to save Dan by freeing him from Haavik’s control completely, no matter the cost.
178	39b	"Taking Dan Back"; Transliteration: "Kogane no Dorago" (Japanese: 黄金のドラゴ)	November 21, 2020 (CAN); December 27, 2020 (US)	December 25, 2020	0.12
Magnus and the AB continue their battle against “Dan” and Haavik’s Thrall where the AB are still determined to get Dan back no matter what. Elsewhere, Benton attempts to explain to Kravitz that he is under Haavik’s control and is making him do all of this, but Kravitz says she already knows because she and AAAnimus have been investigating him ever since, assuming that something had happened to Dan to begin with. She explains that they’re here to help him, rather than capture him because he saved the world once before, and that deep down, he is a hero. In the meantime, the battle between “Dan” and Magnus continues. Magnus attempts to get through to “Dan” by reminding him about what he said to him back in the Core Cell after he freed him from Tiko’s control for starters, as well as reminding him of who he truly is. In a turn of events, he successfully defeats “Dan,” presumably freeing him from Haavik’s control in the process. Haavik appears and regains control of Dan, causing him to summon Drago all of a sudden. However, the AB’s Bakugan manage to snap him out of his trance. “Dan” attempts to corrupt him with the same Bakucore that he used on him earlier, but a surge of light causes Drago to enter his mind. Inside Dan’s mind, Drago finds Dan sulking over his loss to Haavik and asks why he became his servant in the first place. Dan reveals to him that after he witnessed Haavik’s full power, he became worried that he couldn’t win against him, which is why he gave in to his control in the first place. Drago attempts to encourage Dan to break free by reminding him of what he said earlier when he was worried about not being able to evolve, saying that as long as they‘re together, they will always be the strongest. He also reminds him that he will never be alone again, and that together, they will always be unstoppable. In a surprising turn of events, Dan discovers visions of his friends and allies calling out to him before Drago disappears. Touched by his words and the call of his friends and allies, Dan successfully breaks free from Haavik’s control, and as a result, he summons a Fusion Core which he uses to fuse Drago and Auxillataur together, forming Dragonoid x Aurelus. Using his new Fusion Bakugan, he successfully makes a comeback and nearly defeats the Fusion Bakugan of Haavik’s Thrall (he also defeats Storm in the process as well). The Security Force attempts to capture the group, but they manage to escape. In the aftermath, Kravitz reassures Dan that the damage he caused to Dusk Industries wasn’t his fault, knowing that he was under Haavik’s control the whole time. When she asks about Haavik, Dan reveals to everyone that while he was under Haavik’s control, he found out that he is in fact an alien planning to destroy Earth. However, he and Drago become determined to defeat him and save Earth because deep down, they’re unstoppable.
179	40a	"Who's the Fake?!"; Transliteration: "Ayashī no wa Dareda?" (Japanese: 怪しいのは誰だ！？)	November 22, 2020 (CAN); January 3, 2021 (US)	January 1, 2021	0.14
While repairing Studio D, Dan is still feeling guilty about the damage he caused recently, but his friends reassure him that it wasn’t his fault, knowing that he was under Haavik’s control the whole time. Since they found out that Haavik turned out to be an alien in the first place, traveling through space spreading mayhem and destruction everywhere he goes, and having all sorts of alien powers, things go sideways when they discover Dan in a paranoid state who starts to suspect that one of them could be Haavik in disguise, having overheard the idea from them to begin with. Dan starts to grow cautious and continues his suspicions on his friends, still thinking that one of them could be Haavik in disguise, much to their disturbance. At first, everyone starts to think that he’s Haavik in disguise because he’s the most suspicious one here, but Dan attempts to prove that he’s real by revealing Lia and Wynton’s embarrassing moments from their childhood. They too also reveal his embarrassing moment as well. Eventually, things start to settle down when Dan, Lia, and Wynton conclude that they are their true normal selves, leaving Shun, Lightning, and Ajit as the only suspects here. To solve this problem, Ajit suggests having a Bakugan battle, which the rest of the AB accept. However, the battle doesn’t last long as Dan, Lia, and Wynton get into another argument due to their continuous suspicions about one of them being Haavik in disguise. Suddenly, Pegatrix alerts the AB to smoke rising in the distance. Arriving at the destination, they discover a group of civilians on top of a burning building. Together, they rescue the people and put out the fire. In the aftermath, the firefighters thank the AB for their help. Later, Dan apologizes to his friends for doubting them all this time since they all worked together to put out the fire and rescue those people, concluding that they are their true normal selves after all.
180	40b	"Trouble Busters! 2"; Transliteration: "Nigedashita Bakugan" (Japanese: 逃げ出した爆丸)	November 22, 2020 (CAN); January 3, 2021 (US)	January 1, 2021	0.14
A young Brawler named Oliver asks the AB to help find his Bakugan who ran off for no reason. He explains that all they did was have a fight, with no further details. Nevertheless, the AB agree to help find him. Oliver shows them a picture of his Bakugan named Buzz who is proven to be very fast to begin with. The AB decide to set up a wide search by splitting up into groups in order to cover more ground. The search begins which proves to be difficult for most of them. Dan and Ajit however have gotten competitive about finding him first. Suddenly, they hear a Bakugan battle coming from the park where Oliver thinks that Buzz will be there because he likes Bakugan battles. They head to the park and find Buzz there and attempt to catch him, but he suddenly flees when he spots Oliver and refuses to come back to him. Nevertheless, Dan and Ajit continue their competitive attempts to catch Buzz, to no avail. Meanwhile, the rest of the AB regroup, having had no luck finding Buzz. However, they eventually discover Dan, Ajit, and Oliver continuing their attempt to catch him. Drago and Pharol find him at a construction site and attempt to get him to explain his fight that he had with Oliver, but he denies it (because there never was a fight between them in the first place), much to their confusion. He flees again when Dan and Ajit make another attempt to catch him, to no avail. After regrouping with the rest of the AB, they (along with Oliver) attempt to come up with a perfect plan to catch Buzz for good. Luckily, Dan and Ajit suggest luring him back here with a Bakugan battle. Buzz observes the battle from a distance, but unbeknownst to him, Oliver successfully catches him. Before Buzz can explain himself, he suddenly leaves all of a sudden, much to the AB’s suspicion. It turns out that Oliver was sent by a gang of bad Brawlers to retrieve Buzz who turned out to be the gang leader’s partner in exchange for a Bakugan of his own. The AB eventually find him with the gang, having suspected that something was up, and that they didn’t know about Buzz’s actual partner to begin with. The gang leader challenges Dan to a battle which he is forced to accept. Since he’s outmatched, Dan and Ajit form Drago x Aurelus and easily defeat the Brawlers in the gang. As a result, the gang leader rejects Buzz as his partner and leaves with the other Brawlers. In the aftermath, Oliver apologizes to Buzz for selling him out to the gang. Buzz explains that his former partner mistreated Oliver and the other kids. Since then, Oliver was trying to return him to the gang leader in exchange for a Bakugan of his own, which is why he ran away in the first place. Encouraged by the AB, Oliver asks Buzz if he wants to be his official partner, and Buzz happily agrees. In addition to that, Dan challenges him to a Bakugan battle, which he happily accepts.
181	41a	"Bakugan Battle Circus"; Transliteration: "Bakugan dai Sākasu!!" (Japanese: 爆丸大サーカス！！)	November 28, 2020 (CAN); January 10, 2021 (US) (Note: These episodes were first released on the Cartoon Network app and video-on-demand services on December 25, 2020.)	January 8, 2021	0.13
Dan discovers a circus in town. Shun explains to him that Kazami International Holdings is sponsoring this Bakugan Circus to demonstrate just how great Bakugan are. While watching the show, they become impressed with their performances performed by Leo, his Bakugan Rose, Mira, and her Bakugan Mint. However, during the trapeze act, Leo fails to catch onto Rose and falls, ruining the act in the process. After the show, they overhear the ringleader scolding Leo and Mira for ruining their trapeze act. They attempt to persuade him to let Rose and Mint rest for a while since they’ve been practicing all day, but he refuses at first. Dan and Shun appear and manage to persuade him to allow their Bakugan to rest, and he reluctantly agrees. Leo and Mira are reluctant to cancel the show tomorrow since their Bakugan are too tired to continue, but Dan offers to appear in their circus for tomorrow's show, along with Shun, much to his shock. The next night, Dan and Shun’s performance (alongside Leo and Mira) becomes a success, much to the ringleaders' frustration. Dan prepares to do the trapeze act despite Leo’s protest, but he manages to convince him to let him do it because of the bond he shares with Drago. As Dan swings towards Drago, he fails to cling onto him and falls, ruining the act in the process yet again. The ringleader, furious that they ruined his circus, intervenes and decides to put on his own event known as the Bakugan Battle Circus. He uses Rose and Mint (under his control) to battle Dan and Shun’s Bakugan using his circus tricks, as well as entertaining the crowd while doing so. They decide to do the same and easily gain the upper hand. Dan, determined to finish this, attempts to do the trapeze act again, much to Wynton and Lia’s shock since he already failed at that. Luckily, he successfully clings onto Drago, and together, they successfully defeat Rose and Mint, thus winning the battle. In the aftermath of the event, Leo and Mira have improved on their performances, including Leo and Rose succeeding in their trapeze act, now that they're in top form once again. Not only that, the AB discover the ringleader as a clown, and Shun explains that he started off his career like that. Because of what happened recently from their last performance, he decided to start over fresh. Dan concludes that as long as everyone is having fun out there, the circus will always be a success.
182	41b	"Ebony Manor"; Transliteration: "Ebonī no Yakata" (Japanese: エボニーの館)	November 28, 2020 (CAN); January 10, 2021 (US)	January 8, 2021	0.13
Ebony is not happy about living on the streets despite having a bunch of her followers serving her. A group of stray dogs appear and attempt to drive her off their turf. Ebony attempts to use her Bakugan on them, but fails. This leads to a fight between the two factions. However, the stray dogs defeat her followers and scare them away. After that, they leave after warning Ebony to leave their turf while she still can. Her ill will eventually attracts the attention of Haavik who appears and offers her a chance for revenge. Meanwhile, Lightning goes exploring for interesting things to find. Suddenly, a stray dog appears and asks for his presence because someone wishes to see him (it’s actually Ebony). Although Lightning is reluctant to go, after hearing about a feast being offered to him, he eventually agrees. Arriving at their destination, he discovers a strange house that he hasn’t seen before. After being greeted by the other strays who are now living here, much to his shock, he discovers that Ebony was the one who sent for him, not to mention that the huge mansion is actually hers. She offers to show him around her new home, and Lightning eventually agrees. When he asks about how she ended up with a home like this, Ebony explains that a wealthy owner (which is Haavik) took her in and gave her everything she wanted. She then takes him to a room with pictures of all the people who wronged her. Ebony reveals that she plans to take revenge on them for the way they treated her by using her special power and offers Lightning a chance to join her in her new lifestyle. He refuses, content with his life so far. Enraged, Ebony initiates a Bakugan battle using her new Fusion Bakugan Maxotaur x Haos. During the battle, Ebony easily gains the upper hand on them due to the special power of her Fusion Bakugan, leaving Lightning to question her desire for revenge. This endangers the other animals who get caught in the crossfire all of a sudden as they try to persuade Ebony to stop this madness, believing that her power was meant to protect them. She refuses, still seeking to enact her revenge on the world as payback for the way she was treated before. Seeing that Ebony is completely out of control, Lightning tells Howlkor, Tretorous, and Phaedrus to get all the animals to safety. After everyone escapes the mansion, it suddenly disappears, leaving Lightning and everyone else completely shocked by what they have just witnessed.
183	42a	"Everett's Trap"; Transliteration: "Batoru Airando no Shitō!" (Japanese: バトルアイランドの死闘！)	November 29, 2020 (CAN); January 17, 2021 (US)	January 15, 2021	0.14
Shun and Masato travel to Battle Island for a meeting with a promoter to discuss plans for hosting public Bakugan battles on this island in order to improve the image of Bakugan since Haavik ruined the Bakugan Battle League in Tokyo which almost ended in disaster. However, upon arrival, the airship suddenly leaves them here as a group of Brawlers confront them, intending to defeat them in order to claim a cash reward. Shun and Masato eventually find out that Everett orchestrated this set up, and that the meeting was just a ruse to lure them here. It is also revealed that he came up with the cash reward to anyone who can defeat them, which is why he filled the island with many hardcore Brawlers in the first place, to give them that opportunity to do so. Left with no other choice, Shun battles the three Brawlers, leaving Masato helpless because he doesn’t have a device to assist him apparently. With the battle already underway, Everett broadcasts the live event worldwide, believing that many viewers will pay money to watch this battle. The Brawlers overpower Shun and prepare to finish him off, but Shun, discovering the battle being recorded live, and determined to find out what Everett’s true plan really is, successfully defeats them, causing them to retreat. Determined to stop Everett, Shun and Masato travel to the control tower, but more Brawlers show up and battle Shun. After defeating them, he and Masato are soon confronted by Tripp and Strata who are also after the cash reward due to the hard struggles in their lives so far. They battle Shun and overpower him easily since Hydorous and Ramparian are worn out from their previous battles and prepare to finish them off, but luckily, Masato joins in, having obtained a device from a Brawler who accidentally dropped it before retreating. This gives Shun the chance to defeat them as they retreat. Everett witnesses their loss and flees the island. Shun and Masato reach the control tower, but arrive too late as Everett is already gone, not to mention that he was streaming this battle in the first place. Suddenly, Masato receives a call from Kazami International Holdings who inform him that a Kazami research facility is under attack by Mechanoids, which explains why they were lured here in the first place; this was Everett’s plan all along, to distract them from the Mechanoids. Determined to get back to the facility as fast as possible, Shun decides to use the mobile gate which will provide a faster route for them as he and Masato enter the maze, hoping to get there fast and stop the Mechanoids once and for all.
184	42b	"Kazami Vs. McQ"; Transliteration: "Kyōshū! Makyū Gundan" (Japanese: 強襲！マキュー軍団)	November 29, 2020 (CAN); January 17, 2021 (US)	January 15, 2021	0.14
The Mechanoids start attacking the research facility, and it is revealed that McQ is leading the assault. He contacts Everett who informs him that he took care of Shun and Masato by leaving them stranded on Battle Island (he is unaware that they escaped by using the mobile device that Shun had all this time). Thanks to the Mechanoids who drove everyone out of the facility, McQ plans to steal a bunch of new devices created by the Kazami’s, located in a warehouse in a basement below the facility. He and his goons infiltrate the building and start destroying their laboratories. They then locate the warehouse and start searching for the devices, to no avail at first. After a long search, they successfully locate the devices as they start to collect all of them. Meanwhile, the Kazami’s attempt to stop the Mechanoids, but they overpower them easily. Keiko and Koda learn that McQ and his goons have breached security and have already found the devices. They soon realize that they used the Mechanoids as a diversion to draw their attention and keep them busy while they steal the devices. Shun and Masato arrive where Keiko and Koda inform them about the breach and the theft caused by McQ and his goons, and that they were unable to deal with them because of the Mechanoids. Shun and Masato head to the warehouse and confront McQ and his goons, still determined to stop them from stealing the devices. This leads to an ensuing Bakugan battle where McQ overpowers them easily. As a last resort, Shun forms Hydorous x Aurelus, and it is revealed that during their journey through the maze, he picked up Trhyno along the way. Using his advantage, Shun successfully defeats McQ and all of his goons, causing them to flee from the facility as McQ swears revenge on him and the Kazami’s. In the aftermath, Shun is reunited with his father who offers him vegetables for hot pot tonight, having volunteered at a community garden recently, much to Shun’s surprise.
185	43a	"The Awesome Burger Brawl"; Transliteration: "Bakugan Fūdo Batoru" (Japanese: 爆丸フードバトル)	December 5, 2020 (CAN); January 24, 2021 (US)	January 22, 2021	0.13
While eating at Burger Joint, Dwayne (the owner of Burger Joint) approaches the AB and tells them about a new burger product in the works called “The Bakugan Burger.” He also reveals that Burger Joint is hosting an eating contest that will promote its release. The winner will receive a year's supply of burgers. Excited about it, Dan and Wynton (and Lightning) decide to enter the contest (with the exception of Lia and Shun). The next day, the contest commences as Dan and Wynton (along with the other competitors, including Lightning) compete for the prize while going through various courses throughout the event (in which their competitive nature goes a little too far). Suddenly, Sophie appears, having found out about the contest and becomes frustrated over Burger Joints' idea to promote a new food brand named after Bakugan. This leads her to attempt to destroy this competition, prompting Dan and Wynton to battle her, but due to their competitive nature, they continue with the eating contest which proves to be a distraction for their Bakugan. Sophie attempts to destroy Burger Joint, prompting Dan to take action in which he successfully stops the attack. However, a sign falls off and prepares to crush him, but Wynton manages to save him at the cost of getting eliminated from the contest. Wynton doesn’t mind the outcome because all he cares about is Dan’s safety. When Lightning suddenly wakes up, he and Dan form Drago x Darkus and successfully defeat Sophie, causing her to retreat as she swears revenge on them. In the aftermath, Dan is declared the winner of the eating contest, but he decides to share the prize with Wynton due to his heroic actions today. Back at Studio D, despite receiving their prize, Dan and Wynton don’t feel like eating anymore burgers because they already ate so many of them during the contest. However, Dan decides to give Wynton the prize despite his protest since Dan won the contest in the first place, leading to a small scuffle with one another.
186	43b	"Master and Apprentice"; Transliteration: "Torawareta Ajitto to Sutōmu" (Japanese: 囚われたアジットとストーム)	December 5, 2020 (CAN); January 24, 2021 (US)	January 22, 2021	0.13
Storm arrives at Mr. Gold’s estate in an attempt to steal his Golden Statue, but Ajit arrives in an attempt to stop him. However, Mr. Gold reveals that this was all a setup to lure them here due to a fake warning note and summons his devices smuggled from Brakkistan, which return their Bakugan to ball form. He then traps them in an inescapable cell and explains that he’s after Storm’s hidden stash of treasures, revealed to be the collection that Ajit stole from him and returned to their rightful owners. Ajit suggests that they work together in order to escape, but Storm refuses due to his recent betrayal. Ajit confides to Storm that he’s changed and reminds him of who he was before he gave in to that change, making him think back on his past on how he and Ajit have gotten along before then. Nearing the morning, Mr. Gold prepares to force Storm to tell him where the treasure is hidden once again by making him suffer, but a gas cloud (not triggered by them) appears which knocks him and Ajit unconscious. Panicked, he and his guards attempt to wake them up, but Storm and Ajit do so on their own, having faked it all this time. Storm reveals that he tricked Mr. Gold into opening the doors for them by activating the gas cloud on his own. He and Ajit then escape the complex, but are surrounded by more guards and their Bakugan. Having reconsidered what Ajit had suggested to him earlier during their captivity, Storm agrees to work together with Ajit as they use their teamwork to battle the guards, in which they successfully defeat them (especially turning the smuggled devices against them in their favor). Afterwards, the AAAnimus Security Force arrives and arrests Mr. Gold for his smuggled devices, as well as his current ones, and it is revealed that Ajit contacted them and filled them in on everything. He and Storm then escape. In the aftermath, Storm leaves after warning Ajit that he still plans to take revenge on him the next time they meet due to his betrayal. Ajit, realizing that this is the end for them, says goodbye to Storm, referring to him as “master” for the very first time.
187	44a	"Bakugan Uproar"; Transliteration: "Bakugan Chan'neru Arasoi!" (Japanese: 爆丸チャンネル争い！)	December 6, 2020 (CAN); January 31, 2021 (US)	January 29, 2021	0.16
Haavik finishes creating his “Ultimate Fusion Bakugan,” intending to use him for his own purposes. Meanwhile, the AB return to Studio D and discover a conflict between their Bakugan. Drago explains that after they left to go get lunch, Gillator and Batrix started fighting over the TV remote because they wanted to watch their respective shows; Gillator wanted to watch a soccer game, while Batrix wanted to watch a comedy show. This led them to manipulate the other Bakugan onto their sides. Not knowing what to do, the AB decide to leave them to their conflict, but inadvertently get involved in it somehow (in other words, fighting over the remote). However, Lia ends the conflict by turning the channel to a Bakugan battle, knowing that this is the best thing to watch together. Eventually, the Bakugan decide to put their differences aside because the only thing that matters is watching it together. However, Gillator and Batrix still haven’t gotten over their feud yet, so Dan decides to set up a game of rock, paper, scissors which Gillator wins, much to Batrixs’ frustration even though Wynton has already recorded the comedy show, which satisfies him. While watching the game, the screen goes black all of a sudden. The AB learn from Lia that a Bakugan is running wild downtown, which resulted in a TV tower being completely destroyed. Determined to find this Bakugan due to their desire to watch their favorite shows, Gillator and Batrix decide to put their differences aside and work together, rallying the other Bakugan in the process. Meanwhile, Haavik discovers a map with five different tourist attractions and decides to unleash his new Bakugan named Sabrus onto these locations. The AB investigate the site where the TV tower was destroyed and discover Sabrus which they haven’t seen before, then they find out that Haavik is his partner. They prepare to face him in battle, but Haavik declines and leaves because he and Sabrus are going to do some “sightseeing” as a part of their “fun.” After the AB discover his mark that he left behind, they become determined to find Haavik and his new Bakugan and stop them from causing anymore destruction.
188	44b	"The Fusion Bakugan Sabrus"; Transliteration: "Kyōi! 5 Zokusei Bakugan Sēbura!" (Japanese: 脅威！5属性爆丸・セーブラ！)	December 6, 2020 (CAN); January 31, 2021 (US)	January 29, 2021	0.16
The AB start searching for Haavik who has already hit two more spots, to no avail. After they regroup, they attempt to figure out where Haavik will strike next by piecing together the locations that he already hit so that they can intercept him at that location. Since he already hit a TV tower, a beach, and an amusement park, the AB soon discover that he has already hit Pin Point Park. They soon learn that these locations are tourist attractions and deduce that the Bakugan Coliseum will be his final target. Haavik arrives at the Coliseum and prepares to destroy it, but the AB intercept him and challenge him to a battle which he accepts. During the battle, despite their strategic efforts, Sabrus overpowers all of their Bakugan and defeats them easily. Shun deduces that Sabrus is a Fusion Bakugan because he’s using all five factions, which Haavik confirms easily. Refusing to back down, the AB summon their Fusion Bakugan and start to gain the upper hand, knocking down Sabrus in the process. Next, they attempt to pull off a combined attack against him, but due to his mighty power, most of their Fusion Bakugan end up defeated all of a sudden. Before Sabrus can finish them off, a gate appears and a new Golden Bakugan suddenly emerges. He easily defeats Sabrus, causing Haavik to retreat for now. The AB are soon left surprised by the presence of this new Golden Bakugan never seen before.
189	45a	"Ancient Golden Bakugan Garillion"; Transliteration: "Kodai Bakugan no Himitsu" (Japanese: 古代爆丸の秘密)	December 12, 2020 (CAN); February 7, 2021 (US)	February 5, 2021	0.11
Following Sabrus’ defeat at the hands of the Golden Bakugan never seen before, he starts to attack Drago and Pharol for no reason, defeating the latter in the process. The AB then discover that he’s a Fusion Bakugan after separating from his suit of armor. Gillator recognizes him as Garillion, an ancient Bakugan and explains that the warrior armor he was using is called Infinity. They eventually learn that Garillion has a purpose to defeat Haavik, no matter the cost. Gillator begins to ask him about why he’s on Earth, and why he was in a long slumber since he lost his memories in the process, in which Garillion offers to tell them everything. Per Wynton’s suggestion, the AB take him to Dusk Industries, thinking that Benton should listen to his story as well. Garillion begins to explain that long ago on Vestroia, the Bakugan wanted to explore new worlds, so they set out on an exploration journey and eventually landed on Earth where they began to battle each other based on their factions. However, because Garillion is an Aurelus Bakugan, he chose to refrain from taking part in their battles and decided to observe them instead. Suddenly, a meteor came out of nowhere, preparing to crash on this planet, which will destroy the Bakugan, but he persuaded them to work together in order to stop it. After the meteor was destroyed, the substances from it began to spread, affecting Earth’s environment in the process. However, the planet’s life forms remained unaffected, but not the Bakugan because they couldn’t adapt to the changes. This leads Benton to realize that Hydranoid (Benton’s Bakugan) and Apollyon (Philomena's Bakugan) were ancient Bakugan all this time. As the years passed, following the Bakugan’s hibernation in hopes of ensuring their survival, the Great Collision occurred where Vestroia and Earth fused together, but that didn’t wake them up. He thought that Vestroia was on the verge of collapse due to the V-virus, which gave the AB’s Bakugan no choice but to hibernate, until they met them for the first time. However, both worlds overcame the V-virus when they were filled with the light and energy from the Drome, following Tiko’s defeat. That same light brought Garillion out of his hibernation all of a sudden. Since then, he has been traveling back and forth between the maze and the surface world observing the bond between the Bakugan and the children and eventually accepted the fact that there was peace once again, so he decided to keep watch silently. That’s when everything changed when Haavik arrived. Garillion attempts to encourage Drago and Gillator at first to come with him to the maze and tells them to stop relying on children, such as the AB, thinking that they can stop Haavik and keep Vestroia safe by using their own power from within, much to the AB’s shock, but Gillator protests against him, saying that Haavik is a threat to both of their worlds, and that teaming up with the AB is the best chance they have to defeat him. In order to prove him wrong about the strong bond between humans and Bakugan, on Drago’s suggestion, Dan challenges Garillion to a battle, much to his shock, but eventually accepts. During the battle, Garillion is proven to be too strong for Drago, but he and Dan become determined to prove their strength to him, no matter what.
190	45b	"The Name of Infinity"; Transliteration: "Senshi no Yoroi Infiniti!" (Japanese: 戦士の鎧・インフィニティ！)	December 12, 2020 (CAN); February 7, 2021 (US)	February 5, 2021	0.11
Haavik inadvertently lands at the AAAnimus Security Force Headquarters, leading to a battle between the Security Force and his Fusion Bakugan Sabrus. Elsewhere, the battle between Garillion and Drago continues, which is suddenly put on hold when Benton receives word that Haavik is attacking the Security Force’s Base. Garillion is still determined to defeat Haavik, no matter the cost since he knew about him from ancient times, believing that Earth and Vestroia will both be destroyed if he’s not stopped completely, which he must prevent at all cost. Meanwhile, the Security Force make their attempts to defeat Sabrus, but he easily defeats all of them. Garillion arrives and battles Sabrus using his Infinity Armor. The AB also arrive to witness the battle as well. Garillion explains that Infinity came to Earth with him, and that they both entered their hibernation at the same time. However, it continued to slumber after he awoke, which led him to believe that it would never awaken again. Infinity eventually awoke from hibernation because it sensed a major threat to Vestroia, which is why he is determined to defeat Haavik once and for all using the power of Infinity. Despite his fighting efforts, Haavik gains the upper hand by absorbing his attack, leading Garillion to realize that his powers from the Infinity Armor won’t last long, but he is still determined to keep going. However, he loses power fast, causing him to be driven out of the armor. Gillator explains that the Infinity Armor requires a huge amount of energy from a Bakugan, and because Garillion has no partner, he is unable to provide a constant supply of energy to continue the battle. Before Haavik can destroy the armor, Infinity starts calling to Dan and Drago, including Auxillataur, and as a result, Dan fuses them together with the Infinity Armor, forming Dragonoid Infinity, much to Garillion’s shock. Using his new advantage, Dan overpowers Haavik since the power of two factions makes Infinity stronger than before. This makes Garillion realize that Infinity sensed it this whole time because of Dan and Drago’s presence and the strength of their Bakugan battles. Using their ultimate power together, Dan successfully defeats Haavik once again, causing him to disappear for now, but not before leaving his mark behind. In the aftermath, Garillion decides to entrust the Infinity Armor to Dan and Drago and returns to the maze to prepare for the coming battle.
191	46a	"In the Darkness"; Transliteration: "Wana ni Kakatta Magunasu" (Japanese: 罠にかかったマグナス)	December 13, 2020 (CAN); February 14, 2021 (US)	February 12, 2021	0.11
Storm learns that a collection of stone artifacts is going to be displayed at a museum today and decides to steal them as part of his plan. When he arrives at the museum, he discovers Magnus already there planning to stop him from stealing the carvings. However, he reveals to him that he wasn’t planning on stealing them in the first place; his real plan was to lure him here in order to settle their score since he battled him during the Bakugan Battle League in Tokyo. This leads to an ensuing Bakugan battle where Storm realizes that Magnus’s desire to wipe out evil motivates him to battle, which in fact is everything to him. Seeing this as an opportunity to get the best of him, Storm places a rose in front of Magnus that blinds him instantly, giving him the chance to defeat him. Meanwhile, Lightning is taking a nightly walk with his Bakugan until they discover Magnus having a hard time getting around due to his blindness from Storm. What’s worse is that his Bakugan can’t talk to him because he’s too old to understand them. Eventually, Magnus finds out about Lightning but refuses any help from him and his Bakugan. The commotion suddenly wakes up a young boy, and Pheadrus decides to use him as a translator to speak to Magnus. Everyone learns that Storm was responsible for blinding him in the first place, and that Magnus is seeking revenge on him for what he did to him. Lightning offers to guide Magnus to where Storm is; he refuses again, but eventually relents. As Lightning guides him to the location where Storm is, through Pheadrus’ translations, he explains that he’s helping him because he wants to repay him for saving Dan from Haavik (even though Magnus can’t understand them at all). After finding Storm, Magnus initiates a Bakugan battle, still determined to take back his sight that he stole from him. Although reluctant at first, Storm offers to return his sight to him if he can defeat him in this battle which Magnus accepts. As the battle commences, Magnus continues to struggle due to his blindness. Lightning attempts to help him by getting him a Bakucore, but Storm puts him to sleep all of a sudden. Luckily, Nillious guides Magnus to that Bakucore, much to Storm’s surprise, but he is still determined to defeat him. In a turn of events, Magnus has come to realize that despite being blind, he’ll always know where Nillious is and where he’s going to be, and as a result of his confidence and realization, he successfully defeats Storm who restores his sight before leaving. Much to his surprise, he hears Nillious speak for the first time, explaining that the reason they helped him is because of their partnership, much to his delight. The next day, Lightning discovers a hot dog that Magnus left for him as a show of gratitude for helping him, making him realize that he has changed for the better.
192	46b	"Indecisive Emily"; Transliteration: "Nayameru Emirī" (Japanese: 悩めるエミリー)	December 13, 2020 (CAN); February 14, 2021 (US)	February 12, 2021	0.11
Emily discovers a new Bakugan named Chrissy and shows her to Dan. However, she explains that she’s having a hard time getting along with Webam and asks him to teach her how to get them to battle together; Dan happily agrees. As their battle commences, Chrissy and Webam begin to quarrel with each other because Chrissy believes that she can handle it on her own. This causes some problems between the two Bakugan due to Emily’s hard decision making, not to mention that she tried to do other things with them, thinking that they would get along at some point, to no avail. While taking their break, Dan advises Emily to lead her Bakugan by making decisions and showing them the way, that way, they’ll be able to get along well with each other. Still determined to help Emily, Drago and Gillator tell Dan about their plan that might help her Bakugan cooperate; their plan is to stage their own fight, that way, Chrissy and Webam will realize the error of their ways, put their differences aside for good, and work together for the first time. Dan and Emily start their battle as Drago and Gillator begin their staged fight, which Chrissy and Webam witness all of a sudden. Still, they continue to quarrel with each other, but Emily manages to persuade them to work together, which they agree to do. Even though Chrissy and Webam have put their differences aside for good, thus ending the plan, Drago and Gillator continue to quarrel about who came up with this plan in the first place. This begins to affect their teamwork during the battle, much to Dan’s dissatisfaction, giving Chrissy and Webam a fighting chance as Emily gives in to Dan’s advice, and as a result of their teamwork, she successfully defeats him. In the aftermath, Emily thanks Dan for showing her what it’s like for Bakugan to quarrel with each other, which taught them the importance of teamwork. In the end, Drago and Gillator still haven’t gotten over their feud and continue to quarrel with each other, much to Dan’s dissatisfaction.
193	47a	"The Eclipse"; Transliteration: "Nise Ōsamu Wan, Futatabi!" (Japanese: 偽オーサム・ワン、再び！)	December 19, 2020 (CAN); February 21, 2021 (US)	February 19, 2021	0.14
Dan and Drago watch a news coverage about an eclipse, but find no interest in it. Before heading home, they run into the rest of the AB who are acting strange. Dan and Drago suddenly realize that they’re back in the maze, in the world of their opposite counterparts, but can’t figure out how they ended up here in the first place. Mirror Wynton, annoyed by Dan’s might and bravery, challenges him to a battle which he accepts at his “friends” request. As the battle commences, Dan gains the upper hand on Mirror Wynton, further annoying him in the process and defeats him easily. Afterwards, upon realizing that the eclipse brought them here recently, and learning that it acts as a gateway between their worlds, Dan and Drago fly through it as they return to their world. Meanwhile, the real AB observe the eclipse which was supposed to take up to seven minutes and can’t figure out why the sun is still covered to begin with. Suddenly, a group of Brawlers show up and attempt to challenge them to a battle, leaving the AB concerned about Dan who would always show up to a battle. He eventually shows up, much to their delight as Wynton suggests that he battle the Brawlers using Faction Fusion (the AB are unaware that this isn’t their Dan, but his counterpart from the other world back in the maze). However, since Mirror Dan doesn't know anything about Faction Fusion, they have no choice but to teach him. Eventually he gets the hang of it and becomes impressed by this, much to the AB’s suspicion. Still battling, he is almost defeated, but the AB encourage him to keep going and win this battle. Touched by their belief and now fully confident to win, Mirror Dan makes a comeback and successfully defeats the Brawlers, which has made him very happy to begin with. Suddenly, the real Dan returns, and the AB finally realize the mix-up. Dan deduces that the eclipse must have caused him and Mirror Dan to swap places and advises Mirror Dan to return to his world through the portal from the eclipse before it closes. Mirror Dan refuses, saying that he is happy in this world now that he can use Faction Fusion for starters, and that he wants Dan to take his place in his world, which Dan refuses to do. Mirror Dan challenges Dan to a battle to decide who belongs in this world, which Dan accepts. As the battle commences, Mirror Dan gains the upper hand due to his newfound confidence and desire to stay in this world. Luckily, Dan summons his Baku-gear and successfully defeats him since Mirror Dan hasn’t seen Baku-gear before. Even though he lost, Dan encourages his counterpart to continue getting stronger since they’re the same. Touched by his confident wisdom, Mirror Dan agrees to return to his world as he flies back through the portal. Back in the other world, Mirror Dan becomes shocked when he learns that he is now the leader of this team. He also reveals to his friends that he got to Faction Fuse for the first time and offers to tell them all about it, including Mirror Wynton.
194	47b	"Follow Haavik!"; Transliteration: "Hāvikku o Oe!" (Japanese: ハーヴィックを追え！)	December 19, 2020 (CAN); February 21, 2021 (US)	February 19, 2021	0.14
The AB are on their way back to Studio D after shopping for a special occasion. They soon discover an area that Sabrus destroyed recently, having learned that he is very powerful due to being a five Faction Fusion Bakugan. While setting up for the occasion, the AB begin to recall everything that Haavik did recently up until now due to his ability to draw out someone’s ill will and control them instantly. This leaves them concerned about his true intentions and what he is planning so far to begin with. Meanwhile, Ajit discovers Magnus tailing Haavik, having spotted him on the street earlier and decided to follow him. Although he doesn’t want help from Ajit, he decides to tag along anyway as they follow him around Los Volmos where they catch him doing all sorts of weird things to begin with. Eventually, he finds out that he’s being followed and initiates a Bakugan battle. Despite their battling efforts, Haavik easily gains the upper hand on them. Ajit and Magnus use their Baku-gear and nearly defeat him, but Haavik summons his own Baku-gear, and Magnus realizes that he allowed them to push him towards the brink of defeat, therefore allowing him to access his Baku-gear. He targets Nillious x Darkus and is about to defeat him, but Pharol and Auxillataur sacrifice themselves to save him, resulting in their defeat. Before Haavik can finish off Magnus, he cuts the battle short and leaves due to a cartoon show that he doesn’t want to miss out on based on its book. As he flies away, Magnus swears to finish him off at some point the next time they meet. In the aftermath, Ajit returns to Studio D, and, much to his surprise, he discovers that the AB have planned a surprise birthday party for him. Seeing how happy he really is because this is his first birthday party, Ajit and the AB begin to celebrate his birthday to commemorate this day so far.
195	48a	"Tiko's Back?!"; Transliteration: "Chiko, Fukkatsu!?" (Japanese: チコ、復活！？)	December 20, 2020 (CAN); February 28, 2021 (US)	February 26, 2021	0.13
Haavik observes Tiko back when he was corrupted with the V-virus and becomes impressed with his ill will. He decides to use him to create his Ultimate Fusion Bakugan that will have the power of all six factions combined. He is soon contacted by Storm who informs him that they have found his resting place deep within the maze. Meanwhile, the AB hear a commotion and discover Goreene who informs them that Haavik is after Tiko. In the maze, Haavik overpowers the Golden Bakugan easily and awakens Tiko with his powers; he then attempts to fuse him with Sabrus just as the AB arrive. However, the fusion process fails because Tiko no longer holds any destructive desires. He begins to explain that he wanted to create a world by freeing the Bakugan from the need to battle at first, but he suddenly realized from Dan that Baku-battles bring Bakugan and humankind together, and that he wants to see this new future expand, which will create a better world. Still determined to take his power, Haavik attacks Tiko, prompting the AB to join in on the battle with their Aurelus Fusion Bakugan, including Dragonoid Infinity. Tiko also joins in due to the power that Haavik gave him, and as a result of their combined teamwork, they successfully defeat Sabrus. However, because Haavik no longer wants Tiko because he only wanted him for his ill will, and the fact that he is no longer corrupted with the V-virus, following its destruction, he summons Ebony all of a sudden. The AB attempt to protect Tiko from her, but in a shocking turn of events, she targets Pyravian instead and defeats her. Haavik captures her all of a sudden, planning to use her in the creation of his Ultimate Fusion Bakugan. Despite Tiko attempting to stop him, Haavik and his team escape the maze. Before going back into his slumber, Tiko advises the AB to rescue Pyravian from Haavik, and preserve their bright future, which they agree to do, no matter the cost.
196	48b	"Arise, Ultimate Infinity!"; Transliteration: "Kyūkyoku no Infiniti!!" (Japanese: 究極のインフィニティ！！)	December 20, 2020 (CAN); February 28, 2021 (US)	February 26, 2021	0.13
Haavik has captured Pyravian and has already begun the fusion process in his attempt to create his Ultimate Fusion Bakugan. Elsewhere, the AB search for Pyravian and end up locating Haaviks tower (Lightning was there last time during his unusual encounter with Ebony), only to be ambushed by his team. The rest of the AB advise Dan to rescue Pyravian while they hold off his forces. Dan and Drago barge into Haavik’s tower, but they fail to stop Haavik from completing the fusion process, thus creating his Ultimate Fusion Bakugan Sabrus x Aurelus. Haavik easily overpowers Dragonoid Infinity and the rest of the AB’s Fusion Bakugan, leaving them currently outmatched due to the power of his Ultimate Fusion Bakugan with all six factions combined. Nearly at the brink of defeat, Pyravian reaches out to the AB one last time and encourages them to not give up by believing in themselves and their Bakugan before being fully absorbed into Sabrus. At first, the AB are left at a standstill, worried that they’ll lose against Haavik’s Fusion Bakugan, but Drago and the others encourage their partners to push forward by complimenting them on their bravery and skill. Touched by their words of wisdom, and determined to not give up, a multi-colored Fusion Core suddenly appears which Dan uses to boost the power of Dragonoid Infinity by combining the power of all the AB’s primary Bakugan, thus creating their own Ultimate Fusion Bakugan with all six factions combined. Using their new advantage, Drago, who is now equally matched to Sabrus overpowers him easily, much to Haavik’s shock. However, he decides to postpone their battle until later because he wants to prepare a fitting stage for their Ultimate Bakugan Battle when the time is right. He then disappears with his team along with the tower. Concerned about what he said about a “fitting stage” where the Ultimate Bakugan Battle will take place, the AB become determined to defeat Haavik and his Ultimate Fusion Bakugan once and for all.
197	49a	"The AB Bakugan Battle League! Part 1"; Transliteration: "Bokutachi no Baku Gēmu!! (Zenpen)" (Japanese: 僕たちの爆ゲーム！！（前編）)	December 26, 2020 (CAN); March 7, 2021 (US)	March 5, 2021	0.13
Benton informs the AB that he’s still continuing his search for Haavik around the globe and says that he’ll report back to them as soon as he finds a lead. While waiting, the AB become bored in the process, so Dan decides to have a Bakugan battle; more than that, the AB decide to invite everyone else to participate as well. They manage to get the word out and successfully draw in a huge crowd, including the other Brawlers. However, since there are so many of them, Dan suggests hosting a tournament series called “The AB’s Bakugan Battle League,” much to everyone else’s satisfaction. The tournament begins as the AB and the other Brawlers battle each other all at once by giving it everything they’ve got. Dan struggles in his battle against Kurin who has gotten stronger than before because he’s been battling a lot of Brawlers every single day recently, leading Dan to realize that everyone else has gotten stronger than before. Still determined to win this battle, he summons his Baku-gear and successfully defeats Kurin, which leads up to the semi-finals between Ajit and Wynton, and Dan and Lia.
198	49b	"The AB Bakugan Battle League! Part 2"; Transliteration: "Bokutachi no Baku Gēmu!! (Kōhen)" (Japanese: 僕たちの爆ゲーム！！（後編）)	December 26, 2020 (CAN); March 7, 2021 (US)	March 5, 2021	0.13
The first match of the semi-finals is about to begin between Ajit and Wynton. Ajit suggests that they use Fusion Bakugan in the semi-finals in order to make this battle even more exciting; Wynton happily agrees. As the battle commences, Ajit and Wynton use strategic efforts in their attempts to win, which ends up with Ajit outsmarting Wynton and emerging victorious. In the second match of the semi-finals between Dan and Lia, they decide to use Fusion Bakugan as well. As the battle commences, Dan and Lia advise their Bakugan to battle with their eyes closed, which they get the hang of easily due to their strong bond with their partners. Nearing the end of their defeat, they summon their Fusion Baku-gear where Dan successfully defeats Lia. Before the final battle can begin, Haavik arrives, summons his tower at Pin Point Park, and “invites” the AB to participate in his own Bakugan Battle League, much to their complete shock.
199	50a	"Haavik's Challenge"; Transliteration: "Hāvuikku no Baku Gēmu" (Japanese: ハーヴィックの爆ゲーム)	December 27, 2020 (CAN); March 14, 2021 (US)	March 12, 2021	0.12
Haavik announces his Bakugan Battle League to the AB where the goal is to get to the top of the tower and face him in an all-out Bakugan Battle. He also threatens to destroy both Earth and Vestroia if they lose. At first, the Brawlers believe that he doesn’t have the power to destroy Earth, but he demonstrates this by blowing up Battle Island and a part of the maze with explosive devices planted by his team earlier and threatens to blow up more locations every hour. Angered that he ruined the AB’s Bakugan Battle League, Dan battles Haavik, but he suddenly imprisons Drago. The rest of the AB attempt to free him, only to be intercepted by Haaviks’s team. Currently outmatched, the rest of the Brawlers join in to assist the AB. Despite their assistance, Haavik paralyzes them in fear with Sabrus. He then states to Dan and the AB that the only way to save both worlds is to accept his challenge as he disappears back to his tower along with his team. Dan suddenly learns that he took Drago with him and becomes upset in the process. Meanwhile, Benton, Kravitz, and Toshi who have joined forces attempt to uncover some information on Haavik’s tower, to no avail due to his advanced technology. The AB arrive and proclaim that the only way to stop him is to storm his tower despite Benton stating the dangers that follow. Dan admits that he allowed his anger to take control of him, which resulted in Drago’s capture in the first place, and that he is determined to rescue him no matter what. Not only that, the AB manage to persuade them to let them handle it due to their determination to save both Earth and Vestroia. Before leaving, Benton tells the AB that he’ll continue to find a way to disarm the explosive devices, as well as asking for help from governments around the world. The Golden Bakugan also arrive to assist the AB, having found out about the explosive device that damaged a part of the maze. They too are also determined to save Vestroia and Earth by stopping Haavik’s destruction and rescuing Pyravian no matter what. Trhyno also reveals that they asked Garillion to stay behind and guard the Great Core Cell in case Haavik tries to capture it. With everything settled now, the AB become determined to reach the tower, rescue Drago, and stop Haavik once and for all.
200	50b	"Storm Haavik's Tower!"; Transliteration: "Totsunyū! Hāvuikku Tawā" (Japanese: 突入！ハーヴィックタワー)	December 27, 2020 (CAN); March 14, 2021 (US)	March 12, 2021	0.12
The AB and the Security Force make their way to the tower, only to be ambushed by an army of Mechanoids. Nevertheless, they begin to battle them with everything they’ve got. Although the Golden Bakugan want to help at first, the AB advise them to save their strength until they head into the tower. Suddenly, more Mechanoids appear, leaving everyone currently outnumbered, but, much to their surprise, Riot, Emily, and the rest of the Brawlers arrive to assist them, and in doing so, the AB manage to clear the way. More show up, but the Security Force advises them to keep going while they hold them off. Nearing the tower, a giant Mechanoid appears, only to be subdued by Magnus who advises the AB to head into the tower before the door closes. However, the Mechanoid suddenly grabs Nillious X Darkus, prompting Magnus to stay behind to hold it off, but not before advising Dan to win this battle in order to save both worlds. Inside Haavik’s tower, the AB manage to find a way up, only to be confronted by McQ and Everett who attempt to stop them from getting any further. Shun and Lia decide to hold them off while they advise the others to keep going in order to rescue Drago. Continuing their journey through the tower, the rest of the AB discover two paths, prompting them to split up, with Wynton and Lightning taking the left path, while Dan and Ajit take the right path. However, Wynton and Lightning end up running into Sophie and Ebony who attempt to stop them from getting any further, resulting in an ensuing Baku-battle. Dan and Ajit continue through the tower and run into Storm who attempts to stop them from getting any further. Ajit lends Dan Auxillataur and advises him to go save Drago and stop Haavik no matter what. Although he is worried that he’ll be left at a disadvantage because of it, Ajit tells him to keep going while he holds off Storm. Dan relents and continues through the tower. He manages to make it to the top and finds Drago being held captive by Haavik, leading to a confrontation between the two, with Dan still determined to free Drago and stop Haavik once and for all.
201	51a	"Awesome Brawlers vs. Haavik"; Transliteration: "Sorezore no Kessen! (Zenpen)" (Japanese: それぞれの決戦！（前編）)	January 2, 2021 (CAN); March 21, 2021 (US)	March 19, 2021	0.15
The final showdown between the AB and Haavik has begun as Dan and Haavik begin their final battle to determine the fate of both Earth and Vestroia. Elsewhere, the AB continue to battle their foes, but end up struggling in the process because Haavik’s tower is amplifying the power of his team’s Fusion Bakugan, which also grants them the ability to use Baku-gear whenever they need to. Before Storm can finish off Ajit and Pharol who have been struggling in their battle against him, Gillator arrives to assist them, having been sent by Dan personally because he believed that they wouldn’t stand a chance against Storm’s Fusion Bakugan. Still, Ajit is grateful that Gillator is here and forms Pharol x Pyrus to turn the tides in his favor. In the maze, Garillion observes the AB struggling in their battles and attempts to use the power of the Great Core Cell as a last resort, only to be stopped by Tiko. Still fighting Haavik, Dan realizes that Ajit lent him Auxillatuar because he was worried about him. However, he is still determined to win this Bakugan Battle League once and for all by not giving up under any circumstances.
202	51b	"Their Fights"; Transliteration: "Sorezore no Kessen! (Kōhen)" (Japanese: それぞれの決戦！（後編）)	January 2, 2021 (CAN); March 21, 2021 (US)	March 19, 2021	0.15
The final battle between Dan and Haavik continues with Dan still determined to win at all cost in order to save Earth and Vestroia. However, Sabrus breaks Drago out under Haavik’s orders and holds him captive once again. In the maze, although Garillion is shocked by Tiko’s presence, Tiko refuses to allow him to use the power of the Great Core Cell. Garillion argues that it is the only way to save Vestroia, and that he plans to use its power to separate the planet from Earth. Still, Tiko isn’t having it because he was put in charge of protecting the Great Core Cell, rather than use its power as a last resort, and as a result of their argument, he battles Garillion. Meanwhile, the AB, including Ajit, are still struggling in their battles against their foes, but determined to not give up due to their purpose to save both worlds from destruction, they successfully defeat their foes using their own Fusion Baku-gear. Left at a standstill, Dan manipulates Haavik into releasing Drago by making him believe that they can make this battle even more exciting by livening things up a bit. Haavik eventually relents and releases Drago to Dan, giving him the chance to form Dragonoid Infinity in order to spice things up a bit. Despite their best efforts, they are still no match for Haavik. Before he can finish them off, the AB, who have won their battles, arrive and boost Drago’s power level with all six factions combined, leading up to the final battle between Dragonoid Infinity and Sabrus x Aurelus, with Earth and Vestroia hanging in the balance.
203	52a	"Haavik's Final Show"; Transliteration: "Owari no Toki" (Japanese: 終わりの時)	January 3, 2021 (CAN); March 21, 2021 (US)	March 26, 2021	0.15
The final battle is about to begin between Dragonoid Infinity and Sabrus x Aurelus. Before starting, Haavik blows up Brakkistan, prompting the AB to start the final battle, still determined to save the two worlds from destruction. Meanwhile, Benton, who has been searching for clues on how to stop the explosive devices successfully locates the source where he discovers that they emit a unique pulse. He searches for the other devices with that same pulse and manages to locate all of them from around the world. Toshi reveals that Shun left the mobile gate behind for him, which he had been using for a good cause. The Brawlers continue to battle the Mechanoids, but are left currently outmatched. They merge into one giant Mechanoid which defeats everyone, but Magnus manages to defeat it. Continuing on with the final battle, Haavik summons his Baku-gear and pulls off a powerful attack, but Drago manages to survive it, giving Dan the chance to use his Baku-gear as well, gaining the upper hand in the process. However, Haavik is about to destroy the Bakugan Coliseum since an hour has passed already, but the explosive devices don’t go off, much to his shock. It is revealed that Benton and Toshi have successfully disarmed the explosive devices quickly by sending a team into the maze to do so. However, Haavik doesn’t care that they were disarmed because their battle is more important than anything else, and that he is still determined to win so that he can destroy Earth as he pleases. In a shocking turn of events, he gives all of his power to Sabrus, turning him into a giant in the process, easily gaining the upper hand. In the maze, Garillion gains the upper hand on Tiko, still determined to use the Great Core Cell to separate Vestroia from Earth. Tiko on the other hand reveals that the Bakugan fighting Haavik will be cut off from the energy of the Core Cells if he does that, which would result in their loss. Still, Garillion doesn’t care about abandoning Drago and the others due to his belief that they don’t stand a fighting chance against him, and that he is still determined to save Vestroia no matter what. Tiko, having realized the power that the Bakugan have gained due to their bond with children, attempts to stop him once again, to no avail. In the meantime, Drago is nearly defeated due to Sabrus’s new power level. In a surprising turn of events, the AB summon all of their Bakugan at once, and as a result of their determination to not give up on this battle, Infinity starts calling to everyone, which results in all of the Bakugan merging with it, boosting Drago’s power level in the process. The AB, now having hope that they can win, prepare for the final showdown that will end things here and now.
204	52b	"Miracle Planet"; Transliteration: "Kiseki no Hoshi" (Japanese: 奇跡の星)	January 3, 2021 (CAN); March 21, 2021 (US)	March 26, 2021	0.15
Now that Drago’s power level has been amplified, the AB have a fighting chance against Haavik. As a result, Dan powers up Drago with a new set of Baku-gear, consisting of a saber and a shield, giving them a bit of an advantage. In the maze, Garillion reveals to Tiko that Infinity spoke to him and told him not to use the power of the Great Core Cell, which made him realize that Drago has a fighting chance against Haavik now as they watch the battle, hoping that they’ll succeed. Despite using Baku-gear, the AB, now carrying the fate of everyone in the world with them, summon a huge multi-colored Bakucore which they use to boost Drago’s power level, gaining the upper hand once again. In the ensuing struggle between the two Bakugan, Infinity ends up destroyed as the AB fall from the tower, with Drago barely catching them. The tower collapses completely with everyone watching, believing that the AB didn’t make it. Sabrus suddenly emerges, but is ultimately defeated, much to Haavik’s shock. Eventually, the AB emerge from the rubble, having won the battle after all. Suddenly, more Mechanoids show up on Earth, but Haavik reveals that they were sent from another planet to track him down and capture him since they detected his energy and traced him here to this planet. He officially decides to spare Earth and Vestroia since the AB won his Bakugan Battle League and leaves the former planet to continue his “fun” on their home planet instead as the Mechanoids continue to pursue him. In the aftermath, Garillion tells the AB that their Bakugan have used up much of their life force while they were merged with Infinity during the battle against Haavik; if they continue to remain on Earth, their life energy will run out for good. The only way they can fully heal is if they all return to the maze and enter a long healing hibernation which will take years until they are fully recovered. He also reveals that the Bakugan released from Haavik’s clutches are already hibernating as well. Realizing that they won’t be seeing each other for a long time because of their upcoming hibernation, Drago makes a request to Dan and the AB to spend their final moments together one last time, and have one last Bakugan battle. Before starting, the AB become worried that they won’t be able to see their Bakugan for years after their battle, but Dan reassures them that they’ll all meet again someday due to their strong bond, and because they’re living on a miracle planet. With everyone satisfied now, the AB begin their last Bakugan battle as the scene shifts to a photo of them and their Bakugan altogether. Note: To date, this was aired on Cartoon Network. Starting with the third season, the series would move to Netflix.

== International Broadcast ==
Armored Alliance premiered in Australia on Cartoon Network on April 25, 2020, with a terrestrial broadcast on 9Go! beginning on July 27, 2020. In the United Kingdom, the season debuted on September 1, 2020, on POP.
